= The Complete Ella Fitzgerald Song Books =

Compilation album by Ella Fitzgerald
- Released: 1994
- Recorded: February 7, 1956 – July 17, 1959
- Genre: Jazz
- Length: 902:45
- Label: Verve
- Producer: Norman Granz

Ella Fitzgerald chronology
The Complete Ella Fitzgerald Song Books (1994)	The Complete Ella Fitzgerald & Louis Armstrong on Verve (1997)

Professional ratings
Review scores
Source	Rating
Allmusic	5/5 stars
The Penguin Guide to Jazz Recordings	4/4 stars

The Complete Ella Fitzgerald Song Books are a series of eight studio albums released in irregular intervals between 1956 and 1964, recorded by the American jazz singer Ella Fitzgerald, supported by a variety of orchestras, big bands, and small jazz combos.

- Ella Fitzgerald Sings the Cole Porter Song Book (1956), arranged by Buddy Bregman
- Ella Fitzgerald Sings the Rodgers & Hart Song Book (1956), arranged by Bregman
- Ella Fitzgerald Sings the Duke Ellington Song Book (1957), arranged by Duke Ellington & Billy Strayhorn
- Ella Fitzgerald Sings the Irving Berlin Song Book (1958), arranged by Paul Weston
- Ella Fitzgerald Sings the George and Ira Gershwin Song Book (1959), arranged by Nelson Riddle
- Ella Fitzgerald Sings the Harold Arlen Song Book (1961), arranged by Billy May
- Ella Fitzgerald Sings the Jerome Kern Song Book (1963), arranged by Riddle
- Ella Fitzgerald Sings the Johnny Mercer Song Book (1964), arranged by Riddle

Considered a cornerstone of 20th-century recorded popular music, they collectively represent some of the finest interpretations of the greater part of the musical canon known as the Great American Songbook. Verve Records reissued the eight albums in an expansive 1994 box set compilation, which won the 1995 Grammy for Best Historical Recording.

Following Fitzgerald's death, The New York Times columnist Frank Rich was moved to write that the Song Book series "performed a cultural transaction as extraordinary as Elvis's contemporaneous integration of white and African-American soul."

Here was a black woman popularizing urban songs often written by immigrant Jews to a national audience of predominantly white Christians. As Ira Gershwin said, in the line quoted in every obituary: "I never knew how good our songs were until I heard Ella Fitzgerald sing them." Most of the rest of us didn't know, either. By the time she had gone through the entire canon, songs that had been pigeonholed as show tunes or jazz novelties or faded relics of Tin Pan Alley had become American classical music, the property and pride of everyone."

Frank Sinatra was moved out of respect for Fitzgerald to block Capitol from re-releasing his own albums in a similar, single composer vein.

== Track listing ==
The Cole Porter Song Book (1956) (Ella Fitzgerald Sings the Cole Porter Song Book)

=== Disc one ===
1. "All Through the Night" – 3:15
2. "Anything Goes" – 3:21
3. "Miss Otis Regrets" – 3:00
4. "Too Darn Hot" – 3:47
5. "In the Still of the Night" – 2:38
6. "I Get a Kick Out of You" – 4:00
7. "Do I Love You?" – 3:50
8. "Always True to You in My Fashion" – 2:48
9. "Let's Do It, Let's Fall in Love" – 3:32
10. "Just One of Those Things" – 3:30
11. "Ev'ry Time We Say Goodbye" – 3:32
12. "All of You" – 1:43
13. "Begin the Beguine" – 3:37
14. "Get Out of Town" – 3:22
15. "I Am in Love" – 4:06
16. "From This Moment On" – 3:17

=== Disc two ===
1. "I Love Paris" – 4:57
2. "You Do Something to Me" – 2:21
3. "Ridin' High" – 3:20
4. "You'd Be So Easy to Love" – 3:24
5. "It's All Right With Me" – 3:07
6. "Why Can't You Behave?" – 5:04
7. "What Is This Thing Called Love?" – 2:02
8. "You're the Top" – 3:33
9. "Love for Sale" – 5:52
10. "It's De-Lovely" – 2:42
11. "Night and Day" – 3:04
12. "Ace in the Hole" – 1:58
13. "So in Love" – 3:50
14. "I've Got You Under My Skin" – 2:42
15. "I Concentrate on You" – 3:11
16. "Don't Fence Me In" – 3:19 (lyrics by Robert Fletcher)
17. "You're the Top" – 2:08
18. "I Concentrate on You" – 3:00
19. "Let's Do It" (Let's Fall in Love) – 5:25

All songs written by Cole Porter, except where indicated. Arrangements by Buddy Bregman.

The Rodgers & Hart Song Book (1956) (Ella Fitzgerald Sings the Rodgers & Hart Song Book)

=== Disc three ===
1. "Have You Met Miss Jones?" – 3:41
2. "You Took Advantage of Me" – 3:27
3. "A Ship Without a Sail" – 4:07
4. "To Keep My Love Alive" – 3:34
5. "Dancing on the Ceiling" – 4:06
6. "The Lady Is a Tramp" – 3:21
7. "With a Song in My Heart" – 2:44
8. "Manhattan" – 2:48
9. "Johnny One Note" – 2:12
10. "I Wish I Were in Love Again" – 2:36
11. "Spring is Here" – 3:38
12. "It Never Entered My Mind" – 4:06
13. "This Can't Be Love" – 2:54
14. "Thou Swell" – 2:03
15. "My Romance" – 3:42
16. "Where or When" – 2:46
17. "Little Girl Blue" – 2:53

=== Disc four ===
1. "Give it Back to the Indians" – 3:10
2. "Ten Cents a Dance" – 4:06
3. "There's a Small Hotel" – 2:48
4. "I Didn't Know What Time It Was" – 3:46
5. "Ev'rything I've Got" – 3:21
6. "I Could Write a Book" – 3:38
7. "Blue Room" – 2:29
8. "My Funny Valentine" – 3:52
9. "Bewitched, Bothered and Bewildered" – 7:01
10. "Mountain Greenery" – 2:13
11. "Wait Till You See Her" – 1:30
12. "Lover" (stereo take) – 3:16
13. "Isn't It Romantic?" – 3:00
14. "Here in My Arms" – 1:52
15. "Blue Moon" – 3:11
16. "My Heart Stood Still" – 3:02
17. "I've Got Five Dollars" – 2:39
18. "Lover" (mono take) – 3:15

All songs composed by Richard Rodgers and all lyrics written by Lorenz Hart. Arrangements by Buddy Bregman.

The Duke Ellington Song Book (1957) (Ella Fitzgerald Sings the Duke Ellington Song Book)

=== Disc five ===
1. "Rockin' in Rhythm" (Harry Carney, Duke Ellington, Irving Mills) – 5:17
2. "Drop Me Off in Harlem" (Nick Kenny) – 3:48
3. "Day Dream" (John Latouche, Billy Strayhorn) – 3:56
4. "Caravan" (Mills, Juan Tizol) – 3:51
5. "Take the A Train" (Strayhorn) – 6:37
6. "I Ain't Got Nothin' But the Blues" (Don George) – 4:39
7. "Clementine" (Strayhorn) – 2:37
8. "I Didn't Know About You" (Bob Russell) – 4:10
9. "I'm Beginning to See the Light" (George, Johnny Hodges, Harry James) – 3:24
10. "Lost in Meditation" (Mills, Lou Singer, Tizol) – 3:24
11. "Perdido" (Ervin Drake, H.J Lengsfelder, Tizol) – 6:10
12. "Cotton Tail" – 3:23
13. "Do Nothin' Till You Hear from Me" (Russell) – 7:38
14. "Just A-Sittin' and A-Rockin'" (Lee Gaines, Strayhorn) – 3:30
15. "(In My) Solitude" (Eddie DeLange) – 2:04
16. "Rocks in My Bed" – 3:56
17. "Satin Doll" (Johnny Mercer, Strayhorn) – 3:26
18. "Sophisticated Lady" (Mitchell Parish) – 5:18

=== Disc six ===
1. "Just Squeeze Me (But Please Don't Tease Me)" (Gaines) – 4:13
2. "It Don't Mean a Thing (If It Ain't Got That Swing)" (Mills) – 4:12
3. "Azure" (Mills) – 2:18
4. "I Let a Song Go Out of My Heart" (Mills, Henry Nemo, John Redmond) – 4:08
5. "In a Sentimental Mood" (Manny Kurtz, Mills) – 2:44
6. "Don't Get Around Much Anymore" (Russell) – 4:59
7. "Prelude to a Kiss" (Irving Gordon, Mills) – 5:26
8. "Mood Indigo" (Barney Bigard, Mills) – 3:24
9. "In a Mellow Tone" (Milt Gabler) – 5:07
10. "Love You Madly" – 4:37
11. "Lush Life" (Strayhorn) – 3:37
12. "Squatty Roo" (Hodges) – 3:38
13. "I'm Just a Lucky So-and-So" (Mack David) – 4:12
14. "All Too Soon" (Carl Sigman) – 4:22
15. "Everything But You" (George, James) – 2:53
16. "I Got It Bad (and That Ain't Good)" (Ben Webster) – 6:11
17. "Bli Blip" (Sid Kuller) – 3:01

=== Disc seven ===
1. "Chelsea Bridge" (Strayhorn) – 3:20
2. "Portrait of Ella Fitzgerald" (Strayhorn) – 16:10:
  - First Movement: "Royal Ancestry"
  - Second Movement: "All Heart"
  - Third Movement: "Beyond Category"
  - Fourth Movement: "Total Jazz"
3. "The E and D Blues" (E for Ella, D for Duke) (Strayhorn) – 4:48

All music written by Duke Ellington, lyricists indicated. Arrangements by Duke Ellington and Billy Strayhorn.

The Irving Berlin Song Book (1958) (Ella Fitzgerald Sings the Irving Berlin Song Book)

=== Disc eight ===
1. "Let's Face the Music and Dance" – 2:57
2. "You're Laughing at Me" – 3:18
3. "Let Yourself Go" – 2:20
4. "You Can Have Him" – 3:47
5. "Russian Lullaby" – 1:55
6. "Puttin' on the Ritz" – 2:18
7. "Get Thee Behind Me Satan" – 3:49
8. "Alexander's Ragtime Band" – 2:43
9. "Top Hat, White Tie and Tails" – 2:36
10. "How About Me?" – 3:17
11. "Cheek to Cheek" – 3:48
12. "I Used to Be Color Blind" – 2:34
13. "Lazy" – 2:40
14. "How Deep is the Ocean?" – 3:11
15. "All by Myself" – 2:29
16. "Remember" – 3:26

=== Disc nine ===
1. "Supper Time" – 3:19
2. "How's Chances?" – 2:48
3. "Heat Wave" – 2:25
4. "Isn't This a Lovely Day?" – 3:29
5. "You Keep Coming Back Like a Song" – 3:35
6. "Reaching for the Moon" – 2:18
7. "Slumming on Park Avenue" – 2:24
8. "The Song is Ended (but the Melody Lingers On)" – 2:30
9. "I'm Putting all My Eggs in One Basket" – 3:01
10. "Now it Can Be Told" – 3:12
11. "Always" – 3:09
12. "It's a Lovely Day Today" – 2:28
13. "Change Partners" – 3:18
14. "No Strings (I'm Fancy Free)" – 3:03
15. "I've Got My Love to Keep Me Warm" – 3:00
16. "Blue Skies" – 3:43

All songs written by Irving Berlin. Arrangements by Paul Weston.

The George and Ira Gershwin Song Book (1959) (Ella Fitzgerald Sings the George and Ira Gershwin Song Book)

=== Disc ten ===
1. "Ambulatory Suite" (Instrumental) (George Gershwin)
  - Promenade (Walking the Dog)" – 2:31,
  - March of the Swiss Soldiers" – 2:04,
  - Fidgety Feet" – 2:46
2. "The Preludes" (Instrumental)
  - Prelude I – 1:36,
  - Prelude II – 3:48,
  - Prelude III – 1:13,
3. "Sam and Delilah" – 3:15
4. "But Not for Me" – 3:31
5. "My One and Only" – 2:36
6. "Let's Call the Whole Thing Off" – 4:26
7. "(I've Got) Beginner's Luck" – 3:08
8. "Oh, Lady be Good!" – 3:58
9. "Nice Work If You Can Get It" – 3:32
10. "Things Are Looking Up" – 3:03
11. "Just Another Rhumba" – 5:34
12. "How Long Has This Been Going On?" – 3:45
13. "'S Wonderful" – 3:28
14. "The Man I Love" – 3:50
15. "That Certain Feeling" – 3:07
16. "By Strauss" – 2:29
17. "Someone to Watch Over Me" – 4:30
18. "The Real American Folk Song (Is a Rag)" – 3:43
19. "Who Cares?" – 3:05

=== Disc eleven ===
1. "Looking for a Boy" – 3:02
2. "They All Laughed" – 3:02
3. "My Cousin in Milwaukee" – 3:07
4. "Somebody from Somewhere" – 3:06
5. "A Foggy Day" – 3:50
6. "Clap Yo' Hands" – 2:28
7. "For You, for Me, for Evermore" – 3:23
8. "Stiff Upper Lip" – 2:50
9. "Boy Wanted" – 3:33
10. "Strike Up the Band" – 2:33
11. "Soon" – 2:20
12. "I've Got a Crush on You" – 3:26
13. "Bidin' My Time" – 2:40
14. "Aren't You Kinda Glad We Did?" – 3:28
15. "Of Thee I Sing" – 3:07
16. "The Half of It, Dearie' Blues" – 3:45
17. "I Was Doing All Right" – 3:25
18. "He Loves and She Loves" – 2:46

=== Disc twelve ===
1. "Love Is Sweeping the Country" – 3:24
2. "Treat Me Rough" – 2:54
3. "Our Love Is Here to Stay" – 3:52
4. "Slap That Bass" – 3:23
5. "Isn't It a Pity?" – 3:23
6. "Shall We Dance?" – 3:08
7. "Love Walked In" – 3:52
8. "You've Got What Gets Me" – 2:13
9. "They Can't Take That Away from Me" – 3:07
10. "Embraceable You" – 4:49
11. "I Can't Be Bothered Now" – 2:48
12. "Boy! What Love Has Done to Me!" – 3:46
13. "Fascinating Rhythm" – 3:22
14. "Funny Face" – 3:23
15. "Lorelei" – 3:21
16. "Oh, So Nice!" – 3:40
17. "Let's Kiss and Make Up" – 3:49
18. "I Got Rhythm" – 3:07
19. "Somebody Loves Me" (Buddy DeSylva, Ballard McDonald) – 2:36
20. "Cheerful Little Earful" (Harry Warren, Ira Gershwin, Billy Rose) – 2:06
21. "Oh, Lady Be Good!" (Alternative Take) – 4:04
22. "But Not for Me" – 2:05 (45 rpm Take)

All music written by George Gershwin and all lyrics written by Ira Gershwin, unless otherwise indicated. Arrangements by Nelson Riddle.

The Harold Arlen Song Book (1961) (Ella Fitzgerald Sings the Harold Arlen Song Book)

=== Disc thirteen ===
1. "Blues in the Night" (Johnny Mercer) – 7:14
2. "Let's Fall in Love" (Ted Koehler) – 4:05
3. "Stormy Weather" (Koehler) – 5:17
4. "Between the Devil and the Deep Blue Sea" (Koehler) – 2:26
5. "My Shining Hour" (Mercer) – 4:02
6. "Hooray for Love" (Leo Robin) – 2:45
7. "This Time the Dream's on Me" (Mercer) – 4:39
8. "That Old Black Magic" (Mercer) – 4:13
9. "I've Got the World on a String" (Koehler) – 4:54
10. "Let's Take a Walk Around the Block" (I. Gershwin, Yip Harburg) – 4:03
11. "Ill Wind" (Koehler) – 3:55
12. "Ac-Cent-Tchu-Ate The Positive" (Mercer) – 3:37

=== Disc fourteen ===
1. "When the Sun Comes Out" (Koehler) – 5:10
2. "Come Rain or Come Shine" (Mercer) – 3:24
3. "As Long as I Live" (Koehler) – 3:48
4. "Happiness is a Thing Called Joe" (Harburg) – 3:30
5. "It's Only a Paper Moon" (Harburg, Rose) – 3:37
6. "The Man that Got Away" (I. Gershwin) – 5:21
7. "One for My Baby (and One More for the Road)" (Mercer) – 3:58
8. "It Was Written in the Stars" (Robin) – 5:11
9. "Get Happy" (Koehler) – 3:33
10. "I Gotta Right to Sing the Blues" (Koehler) – 5:12
11. "Out of This World" (Mercer) – 2:46
12. "Over the Rainbow" (Harburg) – 4:21
13. "Ding-Dong! The Witch Is Dead" (Harburg) – 3:19
14. "Sing My Heart" (Koehler) – 2:49
15. "Let's Take a Walk Around the Block" – 4:07
16. "Sing My Heart" – 2:32

All songs composed by Harold Arlen, with lyricists indicated. Arrangements by Billy May.

The Jerome Kern Song Book (1963) (Ella Fitzgerald Sings the Jerome Kern Song Book)

=== Disc fifteen ===
1. "Let's Begin" (Otto Harbach) – 2:56
2. "A Fine Romance" (Dorothy Fields) – 3:36
3. "All the Things You Are" (Oscar Hammerstein II) – 3:15
4. "I'll Be Hard to Handle" (Bernard Dougall) – 3:47
5. "You Couldn't Be Cuter" (Fields) – 3:13
6. "She Didn't Say Yes" (Harbach) – 3:20
7. "I'm Old Fashioned" (Mercer) – 3:27
8. "Remind Me" (Fields) – 3:50
9. "The Way You Look Tonight" (Fields) – 4:28
10. "Yesterdays" (Harbach) – 2:51
11. "Can't Help Lovin' Dat Man" (Hammerstein) – 3:54
12. "Why Was I Born?" (Hammerstein) – 3:44

All music written by Jerome Kern with lyricists as indicated. Arrangements by Nelson Riddle.

The Johnny Mercer Song Book (1964) (Ella Fitzgerald Sings the Johnny Mercer Song Book)

=== Disc sixteen ===
1. "Too Marvelous for Words" (Richard A. Whiting) – 2:31
2. "Early Autumn" (Ralph Burns) – 3:51
3. "Day In, Day Out" (Rube Bloom) – 2:49
4. "Laura" (from the film Laura) (David Raksin) – 3:43
5. "This Time the Dream's on Me" (Arlen) – 2:54
6. "Skylark" (Hoagy Carmichael) – 3:12
7. "Single-O" (Donald Kahn, Mercer) – 3:19
8. "Something's Gotta Give" (Mercer) – 2:33
9. "Trav'lin' Light" (Jimmy Mundy, Trummy Young) – 3:47
10. "Midnight Sun" (Francis J. Burke, Lionel Hampton) – 4:55
11. "Dream" (Mercer) – 2:58
12. "I Remember You" (Victor Schertzinger) – 3:38
13. "When a Woman Loves a Man" (Bernie Hanighen, Gordon Jenkins) – 3:51

All lyrics by Johnny Mercer, composers indicated. Arrangements by Nelson Riddle.

== Personnel ==
Recorded from February 7, 1956 – August 21, 1964, in Hollywood, California:

- Ella Fitzgerald — vocals
- Buddy Bregman, Duke Ellington, Billy May, Nelson Riddle, Billy Strayhorn, Paul Weston — arrangers, conductors

== See also ==
- Ella Abraça Jobim, 1981 album subtitled Ella Fitzgerald Sings the Antônio Carlos Jobim Song Book, arranged by Erich Bulling for Pablo Records
