= My One and Only (musical) =

- Original Playbill
- Music: George Gershwin
- Lyrics: Ira Gershwin
- Book: Peter Stone; Timothy S. Mayer
- Productions: 1983 Broadway; 2002 West End

My One and Only is a musical with a book by Peter Stone and Timothy S. Mayer and music and lyrics by George and Ira Gershwin. The musical ran on Broadway and in the West End.

== Plot overview ==
Written to incorporate classic Gershwin tunes from Funny Face and other popular shows into one evening of entertainment, the plot, set in 1927 America, revolves around Capt. Billy Buck Chandler, a barnstorming aviator, and Edith Herbert, an ex-English Channel swimmer and the star of Prince Nicolai Erraclyovitch Tchatchavadze's International Aquacade. Billy's plan to be the first man to fly solo across the Atlantic Ocean is sidetracked by his determination to win Edith's hand, and he takes a crash course in sophistication at Mr. Magix' Tonsorial and Sartorial Emporial to help him achieve his goal. What follows is a series of escapades and misadventures that seems destined to keep the potential lovers apart forever.

== Background ==
Just prior to out of town tryouts in Boston, the original director, Peter Sellars, was fired, with the musical director and arranger, the book writer, Tim Mayer, and set designer, Adrianne Lobel, dismissed soon after. Tommy Tune "nominally took over the direction with his co-director and co-choreographer Thommie Walsh, and Mike Nichols, Tony Walton and...Michael Bennett were brought in to help with the direction, choreography and set design."

== Productions ==
My One and Only opened on Broadway at the St. James Theatre on May 1, 1983 and closed on March 3, 1985 after 767 performances and 37 previews. The musical was directed and choreographed by Thommie Walsh and Tommy Tune. Musical and Vocal Direction was by Jack Lee. The cast included Tune, Twiggy, Bunny Briggs, Roscoe Lee Browne, Denny Dillon, Charles "Honi" Coles, and Nana Visitor. Notable replacements during the run included Sandy Duncan, Don Correia, Jeff Calhoun, and Georgia Engel.

The musical opened in the UK at the Chichester Festival Theatre and then opened in the West End at the Piccadilly Theatre in February 2002, starring Janie Dee as Edythe Herbert and Tim Flavin as Captain Billy Buck Chandler, with direction by Loveday Ingram and choreography by Craig Revel Horwood.

Cabaret singer and Gershwin historian Michael Feinstein served as the musical consultant for the project. An extensive review of the show's creation can be found in his book Nice Work If You Can Get It in a chapter entitled "My One and Only Tommy Tune Fling." He noted in The Gershwins and Me: A Personal History in Twelve Songs "I kept trying to steer them away from what I perceived to be a mauling of George and Ira's work.... Finally the show's orchestrator told me ...to get out of town. Eventually Ira threw up his hands and said 'Let them do their worst'. In fairness, I have to note that 'My One and Only' was a big hit."

There were several tours, all with Tommy Tune. The first was in 1985 with Sandy Duncan which started at the Kennedy Center in March 1985 and included a six-week engagement in Japan. Lucie Arnaz replaced Duncan in this tour. Stephanie Zimbalist starred in the US national tour in 1987.

== Songs ==
Act I

- "I Can't Be Bothered Now" (from A Damsel in Distress) – The New Rhythm Boys, Billy, Edith, Prince Nikki, Mickey, and Ensemble
- "Blah, Blah, Blah" (from Delicious) – Billy
- "Boy Wanted" (from A Dangerous Maid) (Note: The show uses part of the lyric for the first version of the song, rather than the 1924 revision by Desmond Carter for Primrose.) – Edith and Reporter
- "Soon" (from Strike Up the Band) – Billy
- "High Hat" (from Funny Face)/"Sweet and Low-Down" (from Tip-Toes) – Magix, Billy, The New Rhythm Boys, and Ensemble
- "Just Another Rhumba" (Note: "Just Another Rhumba" was intended for The Goldwyn Follies; it may have been considered for A Damsel in Distress as well. Kimball 1993, p. 277.) – Montgomery and Ensemble
- "He Loves and She Loves" (from Funny Face) – Billy and Edith
- "'S Wonderful" (from Funny Face) – Billy and Edith
- "Strike Up the Band" (from Strike Up the Band) – Billy

Act II

- "In The Swim" (from Funny Face) – Fish and Nikki
- "Nice Work If You Can Get It" (from A Damsel in Distress) – Edith
- "My One And Only" (from Funny Face) – Magix and Billy
- "Funny Face" (from Funny Face) – Mickey and Nikki
- "Kicking The Clouds Away" (from Tell Me More) (Note: Lyrics by Buddy DeSylva and Ira Gershwin.) – Montgomery and Ensemble
- "How Long Has This Been Going On?" (Note: "How Long Has This Been Going On?" was used in tryouts of Funny Face but replaced with "He Loves and She Loves." It appeared the next year in Rosalie with a lightly revised lyric. Kimball 1993, p. 109.) – Edith and Billy

== Original Casts ==
Character(s)	Broadway (1983)	Tour 1985-86	Tour 1986-87	West End (2002)
Billy Buck Chandler	Tommy Tune	Tommy Tune	Tommy Tune	Tim Flavin
Edythe Herbert	Twiggy	Sandy Duncan	Stephanie Zimbalist	Janie Dee
Mickey	Denny Dillon	Peggy O'Connell	Peggy O'Connell	Jenny Galloway
Prince Nikki	Bruce McGill	Don Amendolia	Don Amendolia	Hilton McRae
Rev. J.D. Montgomery	Roscoe Lee Browne	Tiger Haynes	Tiger Haynes	Richard Calkin
Mr Magix	Charles Coles	Charles Coles	Charles Coles	Richard Lloyd King

== Recording ==
The original Broadway cast album was released on the Atlantic label (7 80110-2-1) in 1983, running 55:15. William Ruhlmann wrote: "As heard here, then, the music is basically a Gershwin sampler, as performed largely by Tune (leaning heavily on his Texas accent) and Twiggy (singing in a rather mannered British croon), with added appearances by Charles "Honi" Coles and Roscoe Lee Browne. On-stage, 'My One and Only' is a dance-oriented show, and that can't be re-created on disc. But the singers give lively performances of some well-known Gershwin songs." Produced by Ahmet Ertegun, Wally Harper and Mike Bernaker. Didier C. Deutsch produced the CD reissue in 1989.

== Critical response ==
Frank Rich reviewed for The New York Times, and noted that "During this production's troubled gestation period, seemingly half of show business pitched in to offer anonymous help – no doubt the half that wasn't toiling on the screenplay of Tootsie. The result of the effort is not the brilliant musical the theater desperately craves, but nonetheless a slick one, brimming with high-hat confidence." He went on to write "The second half of the handsome show at the St. James levitates with some of the most inspired choreography Broadway has seen in several seasons – all set to the celestial music of George Gershwin and danced to kill by a company glittering in Art Deco swank. Until then, My One and Only is a smart and happy, if less than electrifying, spin down memory lane. Yet even at its most innocuous, this show receives a considerable boost from its Gershwin songs: the entire score, stitched together by a pastiche period book, derives from the Broadway trove created by the composer and his brother, Ira, a half-century ago." Broadway wags dubbed the show "My Nine and Only," partly because of Tommy Tune's association with both this musical and "Nine," and partly because of the number of people who contributed to the writing, choreography and direction.

== Awards and nominations ==
=== Original Broadway production ===
Year	Award	Category	Nominee	Result
1983	Tony Award	Best Musical		Nominated
1983	Tony Award	Best Book of a Musical	Peter Stone and Timothy S. Mayer	Nominated
1983	Tony Award	Best Performance by a Leading Actor in a Musical	Tommy Tune	Won
1983	Tony Award	Best Performance by a Leading Actress in a Musical	Twiggy	Nominated
1983	Tony Award	Best Performance by a Featured Actor in a Musical	Charles Coles	Won
1983	Tony Award	Best Performance by a Featured Actress in a Musical	Denny Dillon	Nominated
1983	Tony Award	Best Direction of a Musical	Thommie Walsh and Tommy Tune	Nominated
1983	Tony Award	Best Choreography	Thommie Walsh and Tommy Tune	Won
1983	Tony Award	Best Costume Design	Rita Ryack	Nominated
1983	Drama Desk Award	Outstanding Musical		Nominated
1983	Drama Desk Award	Outstanding Actress in a Musical	Twiggy	Nominated
1983	Drama Desk Award	Outstanding Featured Actor in a Musical	Charles Coles	Won
1983	Drama Desk Award	Outstanding Choreography	Thommie Walsh and Tommy Tune	Won
1983	Drama Desk Award	Outstanding Orchestrations	Michael Gibson	Won
1983	Drama Desk Award	Outstanding Costume Design	Rita Ryack	Nominated

=== Original London production ===
Year	Award	Category	Nominee	Result
2003	Laurence Olivier Award	Best Actor in a Musical	Tim Flavin	Nominated
2003	Laurence Olivier Award	Best Actress in a Musical	Janie Dee	Nominated
2003	Laurence Olivier Award	Best Performance in a Supporting Role in a Musical	Jenny Galloway	Nominated
2003	Laurence Olivier Award	Best Theatre Choreographer	Craig Revel Horwood	Nominated

== Sources ==
- Kimball, Robert (1993). The Complete Lyrics of Ira Gershwin (First ed.). New York: Alfred A. Knopf. ISBN 0-394-55651-8.
