= Vinton Freedley =

American theater and television producer

- Born: May 15, 1890; Philadelphia, Pennsylvania, U.S.
- Died: June 5, 1969 (aged 79); New York, New York, U.S.
- Resting place: Christ Church Episcopal Cemetery, Pomfret, Windham County, Connecticut
- Education: Harvard University (A.B.) University of Pennsylvania (Juris DoctorJ.D.)
- Occupations: Theater and TV producer
- Writing career
- Genre: Theater Television
- Notable awards: Tony Award

Vinton Freedley (November 5, 1891 – June 5, 1969) was an American theater and television producer known for his productions of the works of Cole Porter, George Gershwin, Richard Rodgers and television shows such as Talent Jackpot and Showtime U.S.A..

== Early life and education ==
Freedley was born in Philadelphia, Pennsylvania. He graduated Harvard University in 1914 where he was a member of The Delphic Club and The Hasty Pudding. He later attended The University of Pennsylvania where he earned a JD degree. He became a member of the theatrical club The Lambs in 1918 He was an Episcopalian and was president of the Episcopal Actors Guild from 1943 to 1968.

== Producing ==
Soon after graduating college, Freedley met Alexander A. Aarons with whom he formed a long term producing partnership. Their first major hit was Lady Be Good! (1924) with music and lyrics by George and Ira Gershwin and featuring Fred Astaire and Adele Astaire. Over the next ten years the pair produced some of the most important works in the Broadway musical canon, featuring some of the most famous songs ever to emerge from the Tin Pan Alley era, part of what is commonly referred to as "The Great American Songbook." The shows that followed included Tip-Toes (1925), Oh, Kay! (1926), and Funny Face (1927), again starring the Astaires. All the scores were written by the Gershwins. In 1928 Aarons and Freedley produced Here's Howe, featuring the music of Gus Kahn, Joseph Meyer, and Irving Caesar; Hold Everything!, with a score by Buddy DeSylva and Lew Brown; and Treasure Girl, with music by the Gershwins. In 1929 followed Spring Is Here and Heads Up!, both with songs by Richard Rodgers and Lorenz Hart. Another Gershwin hit was Girl Crazy (1930). The partnership ended in 1932. Freedley produced 30 shows total on Broadway.

== Alvin Theatre ==
Aarons and Freedley built the Alvin Theatre, today known as the Neil Simon Theatre. It is a Broadway theater on 52nd Street in New York City with a capacity that fluctuates between 1400 and 1500 depending on the seating configuration. The theatre was designed by architect Herbert J. Krapp. The original name is a portmanteau of the names of the two producers: Alex Aarons and Vinton Freedley.

== Broadway productions ==
Production	Type	Year	Authors
Great to be Alive	Musical, Original	1950	A. Ellstein & Robert Russell Bennett (m); W. Bullock & S. Regan (b); Bullock (l)
The Young and the Fair	Play, Original	1948	N. Richard Nash
Mister Roberts	Play, Original	1948	Thomas Heggen & Joshua Logan
Memphis Bound	Musical, Original	1945	D. Walker & C. Warnick (m&l); A.W. Barker & S. Benson (b)
Jackpot	Musical, Original	1944	Vernon Duke (m); Howard Dietz (l); Guy Bolton, Sidney Sheldon & B. Roberts (b)
Let's Face It!	Musical, Original	1941	Cole Porter (m&l); Herbert Fields & Dorothy Fields (b)
Delicate Story	Play, Original	1940	by: Ferenc Molnár; Translation by Gilbert Miller
Cabin in the Sky	Musical, Original	1940	Vernon Duke (m); Lynn Root (b); J. La Touche (l)
Liliom	Play, Revival	1940	by: Ferenc Molnár; adapted by Benjamin Glazer
Leave It to Me!	Musical, Original	1938	Cole Porter (m&l); Bella Spewack & Sam Spewack (b)
Miss Quis	Play, Original	1937	Ward Morehouse
Red, Hot and Blue	Musical, Original	1936	Cole Porter (m&l)
Anything Goes	Musical, Original	1934	Cole Porter (m&l); Howard Lindsay, Russell Crouse (b)
Pardon My English	Musical, Original	1933	George and Ira Gershwin (m&l); Herbert Fields (b)
Adam Had Two Sons	Play, Original	1932	John McDermott
Singin' the Blues	Play w/Music	1931	Jimmy McHugh, Burton Lane (m); John McGowan (b);Dorothy Fields, Harold Adamson (l)
Girl Crazy	Musical, Original	1930	George and Ira Gershwin (m&l); Guy Bolton, John McGowan (b)
Heads Up	Musical, Original	1929	Richard Rodgers (m); Lorenz Hart (l); J. McGowan, P.G. Smith (b)
Spring is Here	Musical, Original	1929	Richard Rodgers (m); Lorenz Hart (l); Owen Davis (b)
Treasure Girl	Musical, Original	1929	George Gershwin (m); Ira Gershwin (l);Fred Thompson, Vincent Lawrence (b)
Hold Everything!	Musical, Original	1929	Ray Henderson (m); Lew Brown, B.G. DeSylva (l); John McGowan, DeSylva (b)
Here's Howe	Musical, Original	1928	Roger Wolfe, Joseph Myer (m); Irving Caesar (l); Fred Thompson, Paul Gerard Smith (b)
Oh, Kay!	Musical, Revival	1928	George and Ira Gershwin (m&l); Guy Bolton, P.G. Wodehouse (b)
Funny Face	Musical, Original	1927	George and Ira Gershwin (m&l);Fred Thompson, Paul Gerard Smith (b)
Oh, Kay!	Musical, Original	1926	George and Ira Gershwin (m&l); Guy Bolton, P.G. Wodehouse (b)
Tip-Toes	Musical, Original	1925	George and Ira Gershwin (m&l); Guy Bolton, Fred Thompson (b)
Lady, Be Good!	Musical, Original	1924	George and Ira Gershwin (m&l); Guy Bolton, Fred Thompson (b)
The New Poor	Play, Original	1924	
Elsie	Musical, Original	1923	
The World We Live In	Play, Original	1922	
For Goodness Sake	Musical, Original	1922	
Miss Millions	Play, Original	1919	
L'Elevation	Play, Original	1917	

== Television ==
- Showtime, U.S.A., TV Series 1950, Emcee
- Talent Jackpot, TV Series 1949, Emcee
- Stage Door Canteen, 1943
- A Dangerous Affair, 1919
