= Girl Crazy (1932 film) =

1932 film directed by William A. Seiter

- Directed by: William A. Seiter
- Written by: Walter DeLeon; Herman J. Mankiewicz; Eddie Welch; Tim Whelan
- Based on: Based on Girl Crazy; 1930 musical by Guy Bolton (book); Jack McGowan (book); George Gershwin (music); Ira Gershwin (lyrics)
- Produced by: William LeBaron
- Starring: Bert Wheeler; Robert Woolsey; Dorothy Lee
- Cinematography: J. Roy Hunt
- Edited by: Arthur Roberts
- Music by: Max Steiner
- Distributed by: RKO Pictures
- Release date: March 25, 1932
- Running time: 75 minutes
- Country: United States
- Language: English
- Budget: $532,000
- Box office: $555,000

Girl Crazy is a 1932 American pre-Code musical film adaptation of the 1930 stage play of the same name. The film was very unlike the stage play except for its score. It was tailored for the comic talents of Wheeler & Woolsey, a popular comedy team of the time. Three songs written by George and Ira Gershwin for the play were retained: "Bidin' My Time", "I Got Rhythm", and "But Not for Me". According to RKO records, the film lost $150,000. Lon Chaney Jr. appears in the film (uncredited) as a dancer in the chorus.

== Plot ==
New York playboy Danny Churchill is relocated to a small Arizona town to keep him from getting entangled with women. He decides to open a dude ranch with the aid of his gambler friend "Slick" and Slick's wife Kate. The local bully is running for sheriff and wants to shut down Danny's ranch. Danny prompts his friend Jimmy, a cab driver, to run against the villain for sheriff. Jimmy is elected.

Meanwhile, Danny falls in love with a young woman named Molly, but Molly heads down to Mexico accompanied by a New York conman. Danny, Jimmy, Slick and their friends all head down to Mexico to persuade Molly to come back so Danny can propose to her. Meanwhile the local bully and his friend follow them.

== Cast ==
- Bert Wheeler as Jimmy Deagan
- Robert Woolsey as Slick Foster
- Eddie Quillan as Danny Churchill
- Dorothy Lee as Patsy
- Mitzi Green as Tessie
- Brooks Benedict as George Mason
- Kitty Kelly as Kate Foster
- Arline Judge as Molly Gray
- Stanley Fields as Lank Sanders
- Lita Chevret as Mary
- Chris-Pin Martin as Pete
- Monte Collins as Bartender
- Lon Chaney Jr. as a chorus dancer

== Soundtrack ==
- "Bidin' My Time"

Music by George Gershwin
Lyrics by Ira Gershwin
Sung by male quartet

- "I Got Rhythm"

Music by George Gershwin
Lyrics by Ira Gershwin
Performed by Kitty Kelly and chorus

- "You've Got What Gets Me"

Music by George Gershwin
Lyrics by Ira Gershwin
Sung by Bert Wheeler and Dorothy Lee
Danced by Bert Wheeler, Dorothy Lee and Mitzi Green

- "But Not for Me"

Music by George Gershwin
Lyrics by Ira Gershwin
Sung by Eddie Quillan and Arline Judge
Also sung by Mitzi Green
