= Sarah Vaughan Sings George Gershwin =

Studio album by Sarah Vaughan
- Released: 1958
- Recorded: March 20 & 21, 1957
- Genre: Vocal jazz
- Length: 73:05
- Label: Mercury
- Producer: Bob Shad

Sarah Vaughan chronology
Sarah Vaughan and Billy Eckstine Sing the Best of Irving Berlin (1957)	Sarah Vaughan Sings George Gershwin (1958)	Sarah Vaughan Sings Broadway: Great Songs from Hit Shows (1958)

Professional ratings
Review scores
Source	Rating
AllMusic	4/5 stars
The Penguin Guide to Jazz Recordings	3.5/4 stars
The Rolling Stone Jazz Record Guide	4/5 stars

Sarah Vaughan Sings George Gershwin is a 1958 studio album by Sarah Vaughan, of the music of George Gershwin.

Vaughan released another all-Gershwin album, Gershwin Live!, in 1982.

== Track listing ==
1. "Isn't It a Pity?" – 3:53
2. "Of Thee I Sing" – 3:10
3. "I'll Build a Stairway to Paradise" (Buddy De Sylva, George Gershwin, Ira Gershwin) – 2:39
4. "Someone to Watch over Me" – 3:58
5. "Bidin' My Time" – 3:01
6. "The Man I Love" – 3:34
7. "How Long Has This Been Going On?" – 3:58
8. "My One and Only (What Am I Gonna Do?)" – 3:13
9. "Lorelei" – 2:32
10. "I've Got a Crush on You" – 4:00
11. "Summertime" (G. Gershwin, I. Gershwin, DuBose Heyward) – 2:51
12. "Aren't You Kinda Glad We Did?" – 3:27
13. "They All Laughed" – 2:23
14. "Looking For a Boy" – 3:38
15. "He Loves and She Loves" – 3:24
16. "My Man's Gone Now" (G. Gershwin, I. Gershwin, Heyward) – 4:22
17. "I Won't Say I Will" (DeSylva, G. Gershwin, I. Gershwin) – 3:24
18. "A Foggy Day" – 3:24
19. "Let's Call the Whole Thing Off" – 2:22
20. "Things Are Looking Up" – 3:33
21. "Do It Again" (DeSylva, I. Gershwin) – 3:13
22. "Love Walked In" – 3:06
  1999 Cd reissue bonus tracks not included on the original 1958 release:
23. "Of Thee I Sing" – 3:23
24. "Summertime"
25. "Things Are Looking Up" – 3:21
26. "I Won't Say I Will" (Buddy DeSylva, G. Gershwin, I. Gershwin) – 0:18
27. "I Won't Say I Will" – 3:21
28. "I Won't Say I Will" – 1:21
29. "I Won't Say I Will" – 2:50
30. "I Won't Say I Will" – 7:49
31. "Of Thee I Sing" – 1:35
32. "Of Thee I Sing" – 2:25
33. "Of Thee I Sing" – 2:16
34. "Of Thee I Sing" – 4:02
35. "My One and Only (What Am I Gonna Do?)" – 1:47
36. "My One and Only (What Am I Gonna Do?)" – 3:11
37. "My One and Only (What Am I Gonna Do?)" – 4:34

All songs composed by George Gershwin with lyrics by Ira Gershwin, unless otherwise indicated.

== Personnel ==
- Sarah Vaughan – vocals
- Hal Mooney – arranger
