= Ella Fitzgerald Sings the George and Ira Gershwin Song Book =

Box set by Ella Fitzgerald
- Released: December 1959
- Recorded: January, March, and July 1959
- Studio: Capitol Studio A (Hollywood)
- Genre: Vocal jazz
- Length: 196:48
- Label: Verve
- Producer: Norman Granz

Ella Fitzgerald chronology
Ella Fitzgerald Sings Sweet Songs for Swingers (1959)	Ella Fitzgerald Sings the George and Ira Gershwin Song Book (1959)	Ella Wishes You a Swinging Christmas (1960)

Professional ratings
Review scores
Source	Rating
AllMusic	4.5/5 stars
The Rolling Stone Jazz Record Guide	3/5 stars
Encyclopedia of Popular Music	5/5 stars
The Penguin Guide to Jazz Recordings	4/4 stars

Ella Fitzgerald Sings the George and Ira Gershwin Song Book is a box set by American jazz singer Ella Fitzgerald that contains songs by George and Ira Gershwin with arrangements by Nelson Riddle. It was produced by Norman Granz, Fitzgerald's manager and the founder of Verve Records. Fifty-nine songs were recorded in the span of eight months in 1959. It is one of the eight album releases comprising what is possibly Fitzgerald's greatest musical legacy: Ella Fitzgerald Sings The Complete American Songbook, in which she recorded, with top arrangers and musicians, a comprehensive collection of both well-known and obscure songs from the Great American Songbook canon, written by the likes of Cole Porter, Rodgers & Hart, Irving Berlin, Duke Ellington, George and Ira Gershwin, Harold Arlen, Jerome Kern, and Johnny Mercer.

Fitzgerald's recording of "But Not for Me" won the 1960 Grammy Award for Best Vocal Performance, Female.

Ira Gershwin subsequently said that "I never knew how good our songs were until I heard Ella Fitzgerald sing them". Gershwin helped Fitzgerald, Granz and Riddle with the selection of songs. The songs were written by Ira and his brother George between 1924 and 1937. Ira also revised some of his lyrics for the album. Granz memorably suggested that Fitzgerald sing "Oh, Lady Be Good!" as a slow ballad rather than the fast tempo version which had become renowned as a showcase for her scat singing.

In 2000 it was voted number 473 in Colin Larkin's All Time Top 1000 Albums.

The French painter Bernard Buffet created five paintings that were used as artworks for the five individual LPs that made the original album release. The liner notes were written by Laurence D. Stewart. The album was released in mono and stereo. The mono album was priced at $25 (equivalent to $276 in 2025) and the stereo at $30 (equivalent to $331 in 2025). A deluxe edition was also available priced at $100 (equivalent to $1,104 in 2025). The deluxe set was packaged in a walnut box, with the five Buffet paintings issued as detachable lithographs. Stewart's liner notes were included as a separate hardback book, The Gershwins: Words Upon Music.

== Track listing ==
For the 1998 4-CD set Verve re-issue, Verve 314 539 759-2

All Tracks composed by George Gershwin and all lyrics written by Ira Gershwin, unless otherwise indicated.

Disc One

1. Ambulatory Suite (Instrumental) (George Gershwin)
  - "Promenade (Walking the Dog)" – 2:31,
  - "March of the Swiss Soldiers" – 2:04,
  - "Fidgety Feet" – 2:46
2. The Preludes (Instrumental) (G. Gershwin)
  - Prelude I – 1:36,
  - Prelude II – 3:48,
  - Prelude III – 1:13,
3. "Sam and Delilah" – 3:15
4. "But Not for Me" – 3:31
5. "My One and Only" – 2:36
6. "Let's Call the Whole Thing Off" – 4:26
7. "(I've Got) Beginner's Luck" – 3:08
8. "Oh, Lady Be Good!" – 3:58
9. "Nice Work If You Can Get It" – 3:32
10. "Things Are Looking Up" – 3:03
11. "Just Another Rhumba" – 5:34
12. "How Long Has This Been Going On?" – 3:45
13. "'S Wonderful" – 3:28
14. "The Man I Love" – 3:50
15. "That Certain Feeling" – 3:07
16. "By Strauss" – 2:29
17. "Someone to Watch Over Me" – 4:30
18. "The Real American Folk Song (is a Rag)" – 3:43

Disc Two

1. "Who Cares?" – 3:05
2. "Looking for a Boy" – 3:02
3. "They All Laughed" – 3:02
4. "My Cousin in Milwaukee" – 3:07
5. "Somebody from Somewhere" – 3:06
6. "A Foggy Day" – 3:50
7. "Clap Yo' Hands" – 2:28
8. "For You, for Me, for Evermore" – 3:23
9. "Stiff Upper Lip" – 2:50
10. "Boy Wanted" – 3:33
11. "Strike Up the Band" – 2:33
12. "Soon" – 2:20
13. "I've Got a Crush on You" – 3:26
14. "Bidin' My Time" – 2:40
15. "Aren't You Kind of Glad We Did?" – 3:28
16. "Of Thee I Sing (Baby)" – 3:07
17. "'The Half of It, Dearie' Blues" – 3:45
18. "I Was Doing All Right" – 3:25
19. "He Loves and She Loves" – 2:46
20. "Love Is Sweeping the Country" – 3:24
21. "Treat Me Rough" – 2:54

Disc Three

1. "Our Love Is Here to Stay" – 3:52
2. "Slap That Bass" – 3:23
3. "Isn't It a Pity?" – 3:23
4. "Shall We Dance?" – 3:08
5. "Love Walked In" – 3:52
6. "You've Got What Gets Me" – 2:13
7. "They Can't Take That Away from Me" – 3:07
8. "Embraceable You" – 4:49
9. "I Can't Be Bothered Now" – 2:48
10. "Boy! What Love Has Done to Me!" – 3:46
11. "Fascinating Rhythm" – 3:22
12. "Funny Face" – 3:23
13. "The Lorelei" – 3:21
14. "Oh, So Nice!" – 3:40
15. "Let's Kiss and Make Up" – 3:49
16. "I Got Rhythm" – 3:07

Disc Four - Tracks 3 to 16 are Alternate Takes and Remixes

1. "Somebody Loves Me" (G. Gershwin, Buddy DeSylva, Ballard MacDonald) – 2:36
2. "Cheerful Little Earful" (Harry Warren, Ira Gershwin, Billy Rose) – 2:06
3. "But Not for Me" – 2:05 (45 rpm Take)
4. "The Lorelei" (Alternate Take) – 3:00
5. "Our Love Is Here to Stay" (Partial Alternate Take) – 3:51
6. "Oh, Lady Be Good!" (Alternate Take) – 4:04
7. "Oh, Lady Be Good!" (Alternate Take) – 3:56
8. "Oh, Lady Be Good!" (Alternate Take) – 4:12
9. "But Not for Me" – 2:05 (Mono Mix)
10. "Fascinating Rhythm" – 3:21 (Mono Mix)
11. "They All Laughed" – 3:02 (Mono Mix)
12. "The Man I Love" – 3:50 (Mono Mix)
13. "Nice Work If You Can Get It" – 3:32 (Mono Mix)
14. "Clap Yo' Hands" – 2:29 (Mono Mix)
15. "Let's Call the Whole Thing Off" – 4:26 (Mono Mix)
16. "I Was Doing All Right" – 3:25 (Mono Mix)
17. "He Loves and She Loves" – 2:46 (Mono Mix)
18. "(I've Got) Beginner's Luck" – 3:07 (Mono Mix)
- Disc One, Two and Three original LP issue: Ella Fitzgerald Sings the George & Ira Gershwin Song Book Verve MGVS 6082-5
- Disc One, tracks 1 and 2 original 7"-EP (Verve VS 100) issued with the above
- Disc Four, tracks 1 and 2 originally issued on the 1959 Ella Fitzgerald album Get Happy! Verve V6-4036
- Disc Four, track 3 original 7"-single issue: Verve 10180
- Disc Four, tracks 4, 5, and 9-18: Ella Fitzgerald Sings the Gershwin Song Book Verve MGV-4013 (Note: The booklet of the 1998 4-CD set is most probably misprinted. It gives "Ella Fitzgerald Sings the George & Ira Gershwin Song Book Vol.1 Verve MGVS 6102", as the original issue for these tracks, but MGVS 6102 is the catalogue number for Get Happy, while MGV-4013 is the LP mentioned later in the same booklet as the original issue for the tracks.)
- Disc Four, tracks 6 and 7 previously unissued.
- Disc Four, track 8: The Complete Ella Fitzgerald Song Books Verve 519 832-2

== Personnel ==
- Ella Fitzgerald – vocals
- Nelson Riddle – arranger, conductor
- Trumpet – Pete Candoli, Don Fagerquist, Conrad Gozzo, Mannie Klein, Cappy Lewis, Vito Mangano, Dale McMickle, Shorty Sherock, Joe Triscari
- Trombone – Milt Bernhart, Richard Noel, Tommy Pederson, James Priddy, Juan Tizol
- Bass trombone – Karl DeKarske, George Roberts
- French horn – James Decker, Vincent DeRosa
- Tuba – Red Callender or Ed Gilbert
- Alto saxophone – Benny Carter, Ronnie Lang, Ted Nash
- Tenor saxophone – Plas Johnson
- Bass saxophone – Chuck Gentry
- Woodwinds – Gene Cipriano, Buddy Collette, Justin Gordon, Jewell Grant, William Green, Jules Jacob, Harry Klee, Joe Koch, Wilbur Schwartz, Buck Skalak, Champ Webb
- Piano – Lou Levy or Paul Smith
- Guitar – Herb Ellis or Barney Kessel
- Double bass – Joe Comfort or Ralph Peña
- Drums – Alvin Stoller, Mel Lewis or Bill Richmond
- Percussion – Larry Bunker or Frank Flynn

String section

- Violin– Israel Baker, Henry Hill, Harold Dicterow, Erno Neufield, Victor Arno, Victor Bay, Alex Beller, Joseph Livoti, Jacques Gasselin, Walter Edelstein, James Getzoff, Eudice Shapiro, Ben Gill, Murrary Kellner, Nat Ross, Felix Slatkin, Marshall Sosson, Misha Russell, Paul Shure, Dan Lube, Gerald Vinci
- Viola – Alvin Dinken, Lou Kievman, David Sterkin, Stanley Harris, Paul Robyn, Barbara Simons
- Cello – Elizabeth Greenschpoon, James Arkatov, Armand Kaproff, George Neikrug, Dave Filerman, Kurt Reher
- Harp – Katharine Julyie
