= Ella in Berlin: Mack the Knife =

Live album by Ella Fitzgerald
- Released: 1960
- Recorded: February 13, 1960
- Venue: Deutschlandhalle, Berlin
- Genre: Vocal jazz
- Length: 33:08
- Label: Verve
- Producer: Norman Granz

Ella Fitzgerald chronology
Ella Fitzgerald Sings the George and Ira Gershwin Songbook (1959)	Ella in Berlin: Mack the Knife (1960)	Ella Wishes You a Swinging Christmas (1960)

Professional ratings
Review scores
Source	Rating
Allmusic	5/5 stars
The Rolling Stone Jazz Record Guide	3/5 stars
Encyclopedia of Popular Music	4/5 stars
The Penguin Guide to Jazz Recordings	3/4 stars

Ella in Berlin is a 1960 live album by the American jazz singer Ella Fitzgerald. This album was inducted into the Grammy Hall of Fame in 1999, which is a special Grammy award established in 1973 to honor recordings that are at least twenty-five years old, and that have "qualitative or historical significance."

One of Fitzgerald's most acclaimed live performances, at this concert in Berlin, Fitzgerald improvised lyrics for "Mack the Knife" after forgetting the original lyrics. In recognition of this, she received the Grammy for Best Female Vocal Performance (Single) and the Best Vocal Performance, Female (Album) at the 3rd Annual Grammy Awards.

== Track listing ==
Original Verve release from 1960 Ella in Berlin: Mack the Knife on MG VS-64041; featuring 9 tracks.

Side one

1. "Gone with the Wind" (Herb Magidson, Allie Wrubel) – 2:25
2. "Misty" (Johnny Burke, Erroll Garner) – 2:38
3. "The Lady Is a Tramp" (Richard Rodgers, Lorenz Hart) – 2:40
4. "The Man I Love" (G. Gershwin, I. Gershwin) – 3:42
5. "Summertime" (G. Gershwin, I. Gershwin, DuBose Heyward) – 3:02

Side two

1. "Too Darn Hot" (Cole Porter) – 3:17
2. "Lorelei" (G. Gershwin, I. Gershwin) – 3:27
3. "Mack the Knife" (Marc Blitzstein, Bertolt Brecht, Kurt Weill) – 4:39
4. "How High the Moon" (Nancy Hamilton, Morgan Lewis) – 6:58

== CD track listing ==
Verve re-issue from 1993 The Complete Ella in Berlin: Mack the Knife on Verve 314 519 564–2; featuring 13 vocal performances.

The 1993 re-issue, and all later releases, include 4 bonus tracks. Tracks 2 and 3 were recorded at the Berlin concert in January 1960 and had been rediscovered on a reel-to-reel tape of the concert initially recorded for radio broadcast. Tracks 10 and 11 were mistakenly identified as being part of the live recording made from the concert, both tracks had appeared on a Dutch pressing of the album in 1960. The two performances had actually been recorded in August 1956 and previously released on the 2-LP set Jazz at the Hollywood Bowl on Verve MG V 8231–2. The mistake was discovered post-production of this CD release.

1. Setting up the Stage – 0:20
2. "That Old Black Magic" (Harold Arlen, Johnny Mercer) – 3:51
3. "Our Love Is Here to Stay" (George Gershwin, Ira Gershwin) – 3:19
4. "Gone with the Wind" (Herb Magidson, Allie Wrubel) – 2:25
5. "Misty" (Johnny Burke, Erroll Garner) – 2:38
6. Applause and Fanfare Interlude – 0:19
7. "The Lady Is a Tramp" (Richard Rodgers, Lorenz Hart) – 2:40
8. Fanfare and Announcement – 0:28
9. "The Man I Love" (G. Gershwin, I. Gershwin) – 3:42
10. "Love for Sale" - Recorded in August 1956 (Cole Porter) – 2:57
11. "Just One of Those Things" - Recorded in August 1956 (Porter) – 3:53
12. "Summertime" (G. Gershwin, I. Gershwin, DuBose Heyward) – 3:02
13. "Too Darn Hot" (Porter) – 3:17
14. Applause and Fanfare Interlude – 0:24
15. "Lorelei" (G. Gershwin, I. Gershwin) – 3:27
16. "Mack the Knife" (Marc Blitzstein, Bertolt Brecht, Kurt Weill) – 4:39
17. Fanfare and Announcement – 0:23
18. "How High the Moon" (Nancy Hamilton, Morgan Lewis) – 6:58
19. Applause and Closing Fanfare – 1:06

== Personnel ==
- Ella Fitzgerald – vocals
- Paul Smith – piano
- Jim Hall – guitar
- Wilfred Middlebrooks – double bass
- Gus Johnson – drums

== Charts ==
Chart performance for Ella in Berlin: Mack the Knife
Chart (2026)	Peak position
French Jazz Albums (SNEP)	26
