= Treasure Girl =

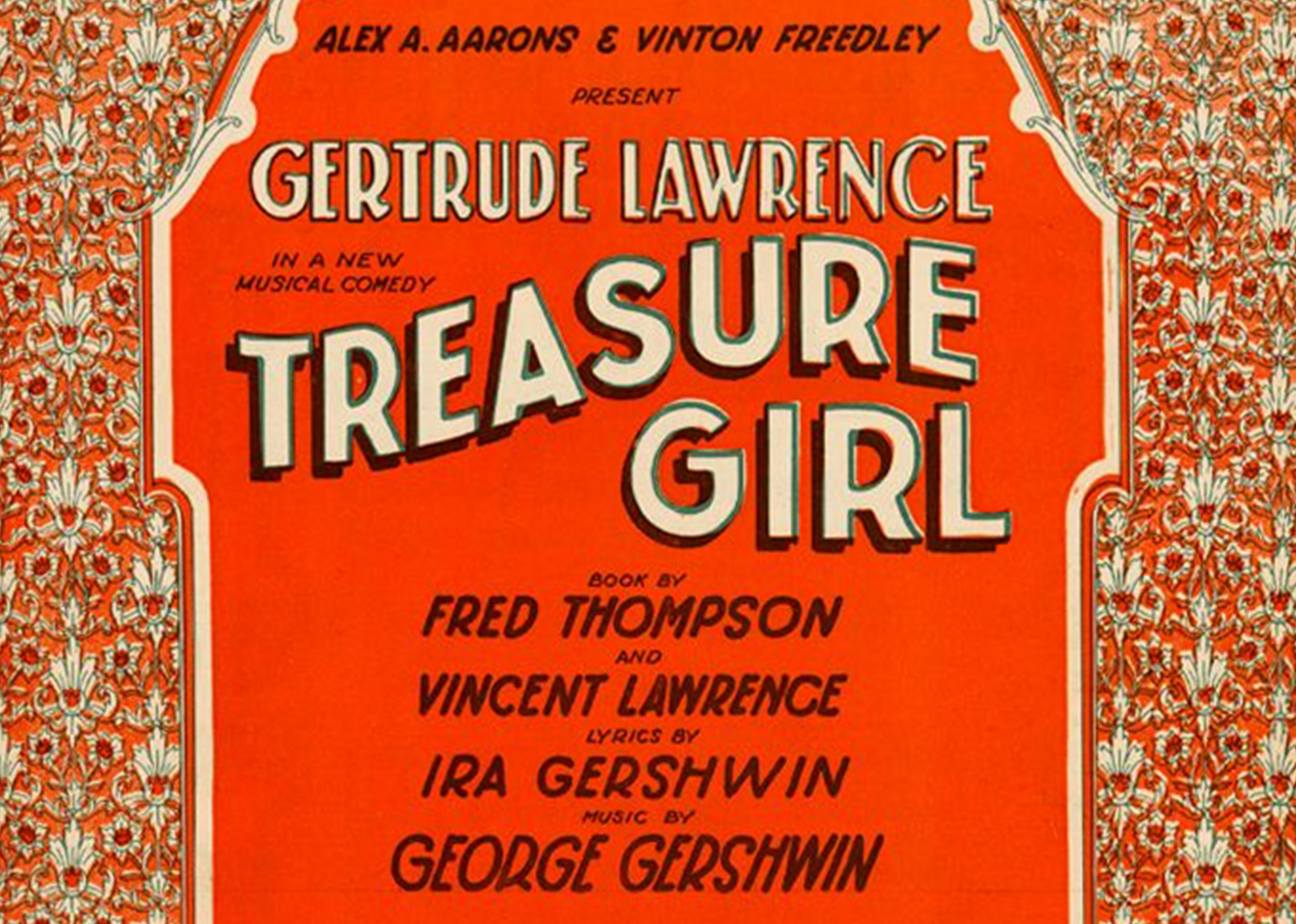
- Music: George Gershwin
- Lyrics: Ira Gershwin
- Book: Fred Thompson; Vincent Lawrence
- Productions: 1928 Broadway

Treasure Girl is a 1928 American musical with a book by Fred Thompson and Vincent Lawrence, music by George Gershwin, and lyrics by Ira Gershwin. It was one of the several Gershwin shows produced by Alex A. Aarons and Vinton Freedley.

Seven songs from Treasure Girl were published by Harms Inc. in 1928: "I Don't Think I'll Fall in Love Today," "K-Ra-Zy For You," "Feeling I'm Falling," "Got a Rainbow" (also known as "I've Got a Rainbow"), "Oh, So Nice!," "What Are We Here For?", and "Where's the Boy? Here's the Girl!" The musical's best-known song, "(I've Got a) Crush on You," was first published in 1930 when it was reused in Strike Up the Band. It was not until Lee Wiley's 1939 recording that "I've Got a Crush on You" gained notable popularity. Since then, it has been recorded by a number of artists, including Frank Sinatra. "K-ra-zy for You" and "What Causes That?" were used in the 1992 musical Crazy for You. The former was used without the verse (following Bobby Short's 1973 recording), and Howard Pollack noted that the latter "went from almost complete obscurity to become the surprise hit of the show." In fact, "What Causes That?" was thought lost until its rediscovery among a large cache of musical theatre materials in Secaucus; it was first published as part of Crazy for You.

== First Production and Reception ==
The early titles of the musical were Tally Ho and Run Across. After tryouts at the Shubert Theatre in Philadelphia beginning on October 15, 1928, Treasure Girl opened on Broadway at the Alvin Theatre on November 8, 1928. It ran for 68 performances before closing on January 5, 1929. Bertram Harrison directed the book, with choreography by Bobby Connelly, costumes by Kiviette, and set design by Joseph Urban. It starred Gertrude Lawrence, and featured Clifton Webb, Paul Frawley, Mary Hay, and Walter Catlett.

In Howard Pollack's characterization, "The reviews were dismal. The critics acknowledged that the sets and costumes were colorful, the chorus, vivacious, and the lyrics, catchy." He reported that the book was described as "vapid, humorless and absolutely inane" in Billboard, while The New Yorker described the dialogue as "hopelessly, remorselessly dull." Gerald Bordman wrote: "The failure of the show dragged down with it some of Ira's best lyrics and some of George's most vivacious music. Ira, for example, came up with clever, telling rhymes such as 'A B C' and 'incompatibility' for 'I Don't Think I'll Fall In Love Today.' George's striking melody for 'Feeling I'm Falling' also got lost in the wreckage."

In The Brooklyn Daily Eagle, Arthur Pollock wrote that the book had "less sense than is customary in musical comedies, even in those of which the Marx brothers are the stars," but that "despite noticeable periods of something very like dullness," it was "always beautiful, dainty, and unobtrusively charming," noting the "delectable settings" by Urban and "often entrancing" costumes by Kiviette. As to the score, he felt that "George Gershwin's music grows a little less witty, a little more abstruse as he gets older" and incorrectly predicted that "I've Got a Rainbow" was "the song that will be heard most hereafter." Pollack noted that this song was "tuneful but not particularly original" and yet "tellingly, many [critics] singled [it] out for praise."

In contrast, Brooks Atkinson and Francis Bellamy considered the score among the composer's best, although Atkinson felt that, except for Lawrence and Frawley, the cast did not seem "up to the task of singing appreciatively in the vein that suits Mr. Gershwin's music best." Rowland Field wrote in The Brooklyn Daily Times that the "score sparklers [sic] with songs of high quality" and the show "leaves little to be desired when it dances and sings, for its music is Gershwin at his best. Tuneful numbers, it must be said, perform yeoman service in breaking up the monotony of a dull book in which there is an alarming paucity of humor." He noted that Webb, "[a] capable comic gentleman on occasions," was underserved by the material except for his dances with Hay. Ultimately, he called the show "worthwhile because of Gertrude Lawrence, the music and the dancing," incorrectly predicting that "[t]hese things will spell success for it," although "it is a musical play that should have been infinitely better. As it stands, it is a production that is smart in every detail except its story and its humor."

== Musical numbers ==
Setting: The Beach; The Drive; The Garden; The Island; The Ballroom

Act 1

- "Skull and Bones" – Ensemble
- "(I've Got a) Crush on You" – Polly Tees, "Nat" McNally and Ensemble
- "Oh, So Nice!" – Ann Wainwright and Neil Forrester
- "According to Mr. Grimes" – Mortimer Grimes and Ensemble
- "Place in the Country" – Neil Forrester, Bunce and Girls
- "K-ra-zy for You" – "Nat" McNally, Polly Tees and Girls
- "I Don't Think I'll Fall in Love Today" – Ann Wainwright and Neil Forrester
- "I've Got a Rainbow" – Larry Hopkins, Jack Wrigley, Mary Grimes, Betty, Madge, Kitty and Girls
- "Feeling I'm Falling" – Ann Wainwright and Neil Forrester

Act 2

- "Treasure Island" – Ensemble
- "What Causes That?" – Polly Tees, "Nat" McNally and Girls (Note: There is some ambiguity as to the inclusion of this song, with some sources saying it was not used during the Broadway run (e.g., Jablonski and Stewart 1996, p. 347). Pollack notes that it "does not appear in the opening-night program and was reportedly added after the Broadway premiere," but is mentioned in at least one review (Pollack 2006, p. 772 n. 14); for that review, see Pollock 1928.)
- "What Are We Here For?" – Ann Wainwright, "Nat" McNally and Girls
- "I've Got a Rainbow (Reprise)" – Girls
- "Where's the Boy? (Here's the Girl!)" – Ann Wainwright and Boys

Note: The song "A-Hunting We Will Go" was used in tryouts, but only a small portion thereof was used in the Broadway run; it was not mentioned in the programs.

== Roles and original cast ==
- Charles Barron as Jack Wrigley
- Walter Catlett as Larry Hopkins
- Norman Curtis as Bunce
- John Dunsmure as "Slug" Bullard
- Stephen Francis as First Mate
- Virginia Franck as Madge
- Paul Frawley as Neil Forrester
- Victor Garland as Arthur
- Ferris Hartman as Mortimer Grimes
- Mary Hay as Polly Tees
- Dorothy Jordan as Betty
- Gertrude Lawrence as Ann Wainwright
- Gertrude McDonald as Mary Grimes
- Peggy O'Neill as Kitty
- Edwin Preble as Postman
- Clifton Webb as "Nat" McNally

== Sources ==
- Jablonski, Edward; Stewart, Lawrence D. (1996). The Gershwin Years: George and Ira. Da Capo Press.
- Kimball, Robert (1993). The Complete Lyrics of Ira Gershwin (First ed.). New York: Alfred A. Knopf. ISBN 0-394-55651-8.
- Pollack, Howard (2006). George Gershwin: His Life and Work. University of California Press.
- Pollock, Arthur (9 November 1928). "The Theaters". The Brooklyn Daily Eagle. Brooklyn, New York. p. 20A – via Newspapers.com.
