= Just Another Rhumba =

Song composed by George and Ira Gershwin

"Just Another Rhumba" is a song composed by George and Ira Gershwin. It was originally composed for The Goldwyn Follies but was not used. It possibly was considered for A Damsel in Distress as well. It was copyrighted in July 1937 and first published in October 1959 (Gershwin Publishing Corporation/Chappell & Co., Inc., Plate 122-8).

== Notable recordings ==
- Ella Fitzgerald - Ella Fitzgerald Sings the George and Ira Gershwin Songbook (1959)
