= Pardon My English =

- 1993 studio cast recording
- Music: George Gershwin
- Lyrics: Ira Gershwin
- Book: Herbert Fields; Morrie Ryskind
- Productions: 1933 Broadway; 2004 Encores! 2009 Dresden

Pardon My English is a musical with a book by Herbert Fields and Morrie Ryskind, lyrics by Ira Gershwin, and music by George Gershwin. Set in 1933 Dresden, the farcical plot satirizes the Prohibition era.

== Production history ==
Producers Alex A. Aarons and Vinton Freedley approached the Gershwins to create a showcase for the talents of English music hall star Jack Buchanan, and linked them with Fields and Ryskind, whose book required the actor to appear in dual roles, lower-class German thug Golo Schmidt and upper-crust British nobleman Michael Bramleigh. The sophisticated Buchanan had no problem portraying Bramleigh but was unable to capture the essence of Schmidt. The show opened in Philadelphia to critical pans.

Rather than proceed to Broadway, the creative team added characters and expanded the role of police commissioner Bauer, played by radio's "Baron Munchausen", Jack Pearl. The revised production opened in Newark on January 2, 1933, but it was obvious that Buchanan was still a major problem. He bought out his contract and the producers replaced him with dialect comedian George Givot. Ira Gershwin reported that "[d]uring the weeks we were on the road (Philadelphia, Boston, and even a week in Brooklyn), at least five or six librettists and play doctors were called in to work on the book. Herbert Fields was the only one brave enough to allow himself to be billed as librettist."

The production opened on Broadway on January 20, 1933, at the Majestic Theatre and ran for 43 performances. The book was directed by John McGowan (playwright), the production was staged by producer Vinton Freedley, and the musical numbers were staged by George Hale. In addition to Givot and Pearl, the cast included Josephine Huston as Bauer's daughter Ilse and musical-comedy star Lyda Roberti (her speciality was a "polyglot of Polish, German, and near-Hungarian") as Gita Gobel. According to Ben Brantley, "By the time it hit Broadway it was a desperately stitched patchwork that ran for 33 performances before exiting into oblivion." The critics unanimously condemned it.

Ira Gershwin later called the show "a headache from start to finish." He "disliked enormously the central notion of the project" regarding the psychiatric "aberration" and felt that the project was unnecessary, as the Gershwins were "lucky to be making a living from Of Thee I Sing during the "deepest" part of the Great Depression. "[S]o why toil and moil for six months on something we didn't want or need? However, loyalty to producer Aarons, who was broke and who told us if we didn't do the score his potential backers would back out, induced us to go ahead." He conceded "there were a couple of pretty good songs, like 'Isn't It a Pity?' and 'My Cousin in Milwaukee, and a couple of pretty good comedy scenes."

In 1982, a producer discovered a number of the musical's manuscripts in the Warner Brothers warehouse in Secaucus, New Jersey. The score was pieced together and performed at the Library of Congress in concert in 1987. Elektra Records released a studio cast album featuring John Cullum and William Katt in 1993.

New York City Center's Encores! presented a staged concert in 2004, with a revised book by David Ives. Directed by Gary Griffin and choreographed by Rob Ashford, it featured Brian d'Arcy James as Golo/Michael, Emily Skinner as Gita, Jennifer Laura Thompson as Frieda (originally Ilse), and Rob Bartlett as Bauer. 42nd Street Moon, San Francisco, California, presented a staged concert in November 2006.

The European premiere took place on November 29, 2009, at the Dresden State Operetta in Dresden, translated by Wolfgang Adenberg, directed by Holger Hauer and conducted by Ernst Theis.

== Plot synopsis ==
In order to promote the sale of beer and wine, the German government bans the sale of all non-alcoholic beverages. In retaliation, Golo Schmidt opens Club 21, a speakeasy where patrons can imbibe such forbidden drinks as cream soda and ginger ale. Police Commissioner Bauer makes it his mission to shut down the illegal operation.

Golo decides to disrupt a birthday celebration for Bauer, but while en route to the party he is struck by a car and knocked unconscious. When he awakens in Bauer's home, he believes he is Michael Bramleigh, a wealthy, sophisticated member of British society. He eventually falls in love with Bauer's daughter Ilse and proposes marriage.

A birdhouse falls on Bramleigh, and his memory returns. Golo once again, he has no memory of his relationship with Ilse and returns to Club 21 and his sweetheart Gita Gobel. Hearing Bauer's daughter is about to marry, he plans to kidnap the bride and hold her for ransom. At the wedding, Golo locates Ilse, who naturally thinks he's her fiancé Michael, and the two escape to an inn in Schandau.

Golo, inexplicably thinking he's Michael once again, returns to Bauer's house and apologizes for missing the wedding. The two plot to find Ilse and save her from her kidnapper. Recognized as Golo by some and Michael by others, the hero becomes involved in a series of comic misadventures.

== Song list ==
Act I

- Overture
- In Three Quarter Time
- The Lorelei
- Pardon My English
- Dancing in the Streets
- So What?
- Isn't It a Pity?
- My Cousin in Milwaukee
- Hail the Happy Couple (*)
- The Dresden Northwest Mounted
- Luckiest Man in the World
- What Sort of Wedding Is This?

Act II

- Tonight
- Where You Go, I Go
- I've Got to Be There
- The Dresden Northwest Mounted (Reprise)
- He's Not Himself

Other songs

- Freud and Jung and Adler/He's Oversexed (Viennese Sextet)
- Watch Your Head (*)

(*) Would be modified as "Comes the Revolution" in Let 'Em Eat Cake
