= Oh, So Nice! =

"Oh, So Nice!" is a song composed by George Gershwin, with lyrics by Ira Gershwin.

George Gershwin described the song as an effort "to get the effect of a Viennese waltz in foxtrot time" with Ira relating that the lyric took "days and days" to write due to its many internal rhymes. Ira felt the song was a "waltz effect in foxtrot" with "short and definite" musical phrases. Ethan Mordden has described it as "so oddly accented that it sounds like a waltz in 4/4 time."

The song was introduced by Gertrude Lawrence and Paul Frawley as the characters Ann Wainwright and Neil Forrester in the 1928 musical Treasure Girl, where it was featured as a duet in the first act. It is sung when the characters encounter each other for the first time in the musical, the pair having formerly been lovers. Lawrence Delbert Stewart, writing in The Gershwins: Words Upon Music, wrote that "Oh, So Nice!" was "so lovely...that one finds it difficult to believe that Miss Lawrence's role portrayed her as a malicious liar and a spoiled young woman". Walter Rimler, in his A Gershwin Companion: A Critical Inventory & Discography describes the verse as "evocative and beautiful". The New Yorker magazine described it as "effortlessly lovely" in 1959. Howard Pollack felt the song was reminiscent of the Gershwin's earlier songs "Clap Yo' Hands" and "Let's Kiss and Make Up" through its attempt to capture a Viennese waltz in to a foxtrot tempo. Pollock praised the song's "unprecedented suavity" with its "subtle metrical shifts throughout its main theme". Pollock felt the melody of "Oh, So Nice!" was reminiscent of "Ohne mich" from Richard Strauss's Der Rosenkavalier.

Edward Jablonski felt that it was one of the "outstanding songs" from Treasure Girl along with "I've Got a Crush on You", "I Don't Think I'll Fall in Love Today," and "Where's the Boy?".

== Notable recordings ==
- Ella Fitzgerald - Ella Fitzgerald Sings the George and Ira Gershwin Songbook (Verve, 1959)
- Betty Comden (with pianist Richard Lewine) - Remember These: Songs from Treasure Girl and Chee-Chee (Ava, 1963)

== Sources ==
- Kimball, Robert (1993). The Complete Lyrics of Ira Gershwin (First ed.). New York: Alfred A. Knopf. ISBN 0-394-55651-8.
- Pollack, Howard (2006). George Gershwin: His Life and Work. University of California Press.
