= Tommy Tune =

American actor (born 1939)

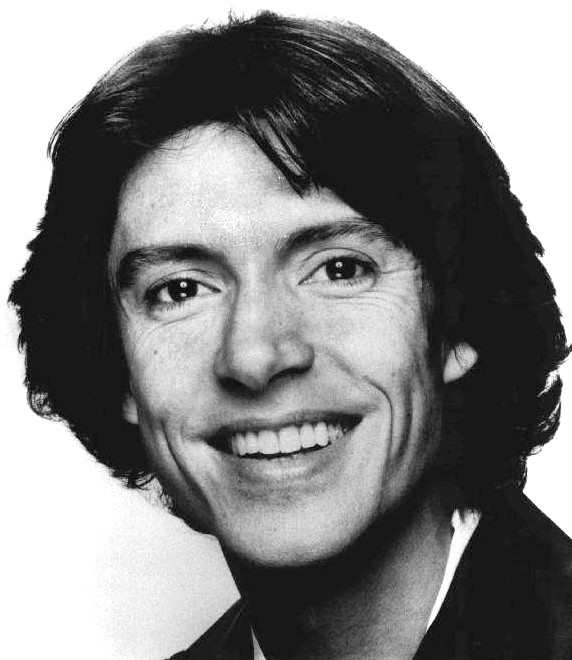
- Tune in 1977
- Born: Thomas James Tune; February 28, 1939 (age 87); Wichita Falls, Texas, U.S.
- Education: Lon Morris College; University of Texas, Austin (BFA); University of Houston (MFA)
- Occupations: Actor; choreographer; dancer; singer; theatre director; producer
- Years active: 1965–present
- Website: http://www.tommytune.com/

Thomas James Tune (born February 28, 1939) is an American actor, dancer, singer, theatre director, producer, and choreographer. Over the course of his career, he has won ten Tony Awards, the National Medal of Arts, and a star on the Hollywood Walk of Fame.

== Life and career ==
=== Early years and education ===
Tune was born in Wichita Falls, Texas, to oil rig worker, horse trainer, and restaurateur Jim Tune and Eva Mae Clark along with his sister, Gracey. He attended Mirabeau B. Lamar High School, Houston, and the Methodist-affiliated Lon Morris College in Jacksonville, Texas. He studied dance under Patsy Swayze in Houston. He also studied dance with Kit Andree in Boulder, Colorado. He went on to earn his Bachelor of Fine Arts in Drama from the University of Texas at Austin in 1962 and his Master of Fine Arts in Directing from the University of Houston. Tune later moved to New York to start his career.

=== Career ===
Tune stands a lanky 6 feet 6 1/2 inches (199.4 cm) tall, and at first he found his height to be a disadvantage when auditioning for roles, as he would tower over potential co-stars. He wore horizontally striped shirts to auditions, dipped extra low when he did pliés and learned to dance upstage ("I'd look shorter that way. It's a law of perspective") to try to overcome it.

In 1965, Tune made his Broadway debut as a performer in the musical Baker Street. He gained national attention in 1969 when TV producer Greg Garrison hired him as a specialty dancer and assistant choreographer for The Dean Martin Show and its summer replacement series, Dean Martin Presents The Golddiggers.

Tommy Tune became well known behind the scenes as a reliable dance expert. In 1978, when the musical-comedy revue Hellzapoppin starring Jerry Lewis and Lynn Redgrave was having an out-of-town tryout, Tune was called in three weeks before the show's Broadway bow: he arrived in Boston on a Saturday to debut in a dance number on the following Monday. Tune's contribution came too late to save the show, which closed less than a week later when a plan to televise Hellzapoppin suddenly fell through.

Tune's first Broadway directing and choreography credits were for the original production of The Best Little Whorehouse in Texas in 1978. His direction of Maury Yeston's Nine in 1982, which also won the Tony for Best Musical, garnered him his first Tony for direction of a musical. He has gone on to direct and/or choreograph eight Broadway musicals. He directed a new musical titled Turn of the Century, which premiered at the Goodman Theatre in Chicago on September 19, 2008, and closed on November 2, 2008.

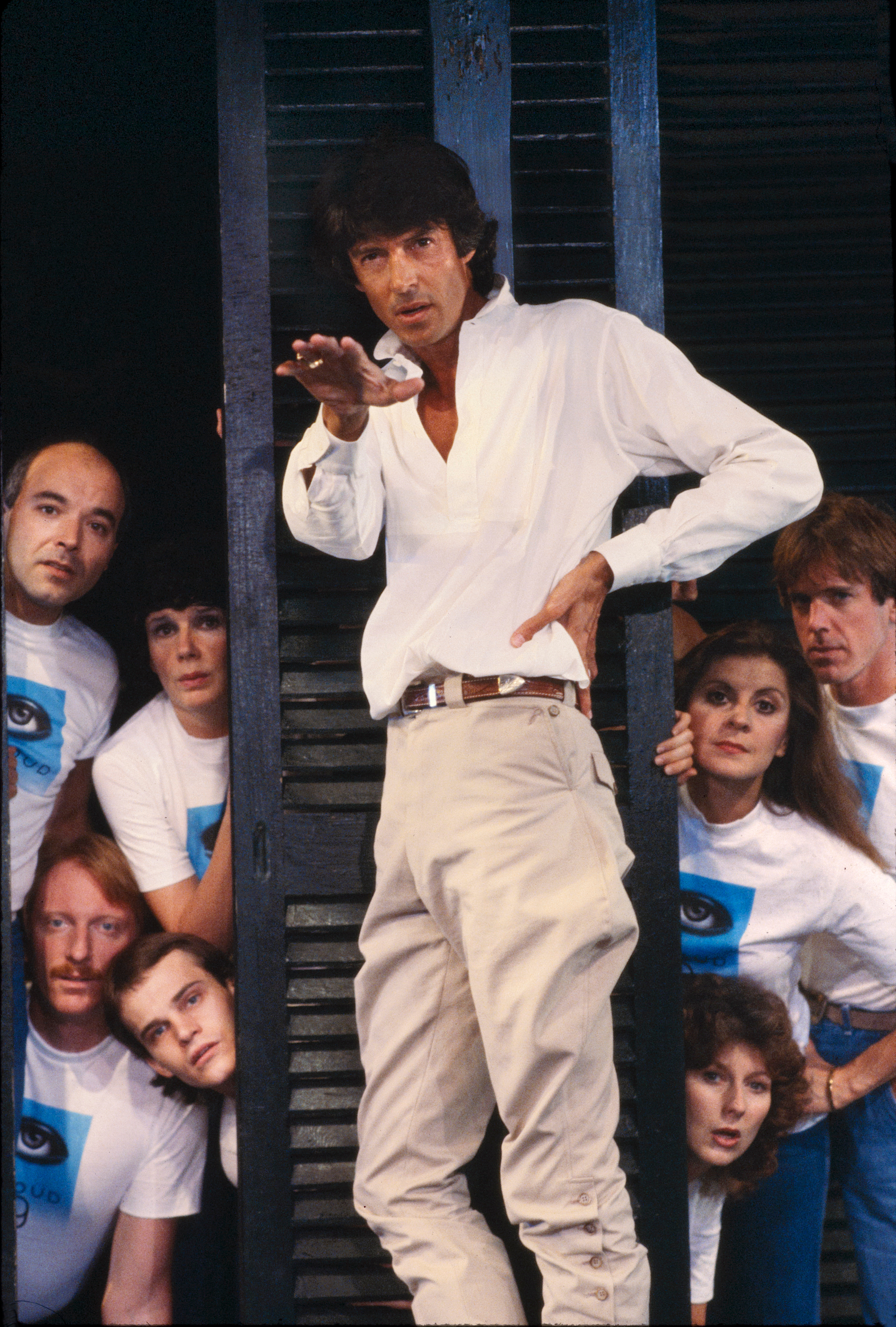
Tommy Tune directing Cloud 9 in 1982

Off-Broadway, Tune has directed The Club and Cloud 9. Tune toured the United States in the Sherman Brothers musical Busker Alley in 1994–1995, and in the stage adaptation of the film Dr. Dolittle in 2006.

Tune is the only person to win Tony Awards in the same categories (Best Choreography and Best Direction of a Musical) in consecutive years (1990 and 1991), and the first to win in four categories. He has won ten Tony Awards, including a Lifetime Achievement Award in 2015.

Tune appeared in a 1975 TV special titled Welcome to the "World" along with Lucie Arnaz and Lyle Waggoner to promote the opening of Space Mountain at Walt Disney World. His film credits include Ambrose Kemper in Hello, Dolly! (1969), directed by Gene Kelly and starring Barbra Streisand, The Boy Friend (1971) with Twiggy, and Mimì Bluette... fiore del mio giardino (1976) with Shelley Winters and Monica Vitti. He also appeared briefly on Mister Rogers' Neighborhood in 1988.

Tune released his first record album, Slow Dancin', in 1997 on the RCA label featuring a collection of his favorite romantic ballads. In 1999, he made his Las Vegas debut as the star of EFX at the MGM Grand Las Vegas.

Tune staged an elaborate musical entitled Paparazzi for the Holland America Line cruise ship the Oosterdam in 2003. He works often with The Manhattan Rhythm Kings, for example touring in a Big Band revue entitled Song and Dance Man and White Tie and Tails (2002).

Tune performed in his musical revue, Steps in Time: A Broadway Biography in Song and Dance, in Boston in April 2008 and continuing in various venues from Bethesda, Maryland in January 2009 to California in February 2009.

The Tommy Tune Awards, presented annually by Theatre Under The Stars (TUTS), honor excellence in high school musical theatre in Houston. The current home of the Tommy Tune Awards is the Hobby Center for the Performing Arts in Houston, Texas.

Tune appeared as Argyle Austero in the revived fourth and fifth seasons of Arrested Development on Netflix. In 2015, he made a return to the New York stage as a featured performer in City Center's staged concert Encores!. He was featured in two numbers in Lady, Be Good!; his first act number was the Gershwin standard "Fascinating Rhythm."

In the eighteenth episode of the sixth season of The Simpsons, "A Star Is Burns," the citizens of Springfield are invited to make their own movies for a town film festival. Mr. Burns's film, "A Burns for All Seasons," features Tune's name in the credits, playing the role of Waylon Smithers.

=== Personal life ===
Before leaving Texas in the 1960s for a Broadway career in New York, Tune worked with Mary Highsmith (mother of novelist Patricia Highsmith) at the Point Summer Theatre. In a letter to her daughter, Highsmith referred to Tune as her "adopted boy" whom she called "Romano." Tune later praised Highsmith for helping him develop his talents: "She was an opening for me; she opened a little bit of my tight fabric so that I might peer through." When not performing, he used to run an art gallery in Tribeca that featured his own work. As of 2014, it is no longer open.

In 1997, Tune's memoir, Footnotes, was published. In it, he wrote about what drives him as a performer, choreographer, and director and reminisced about his days with Twiggy in My One and Only; as well as meeting and working with his many idols. He further wrote about being openly gay in the world of theater; about losing his partner, choreographer David Steiger Wolfe, to AIDS in 1994, and about the unhappy ending of his relationship with A Chorus Line actor Michel Stuart. He also described a woman whom he did not name but who he said was the "love of [his] life," and some media speculated that the description he gave appeared to fit Twiggy.

In September 2021, Tommy Tune was elected the honorary president of the American Guild of Variety Artists, the labor union for non-actor stage performers.

== Broadway productions ==
- Baker Street (1965) (performer)
- A Joyful Noise (1966) (performer)
- How Now, Dow Jones (1967) (performer)
- Seesaw (1973) (performer, associate choreographer)
- The Best Little Whorehouse in Texas (1978) (director, choreographer)
- A Day in Hollywood / A Night in the Ukraine (1980) (director, choreographer)
- Nine (1982) (director)
- My One and Only (1983) (performer, choreographer)
- Stepping Out (1987) (director)
- Grand Hotel (1989) (director, choreographer)
- The Will Rogers Follies (1991) (director, choreographer)
- Tommy Tune Tonite! (1992) (performer)
- Bye Bye Birdie (1992) touring production (performer)
- The Best Little Whorehouse Goes Public (1994) (director, choreographer)
- Grease (1994 revival) (production supervisor)

== Awards and nominations ==
Year	Award	Category	Work	Result
1974	Tony Award	Best Performance by a Featured Actor in a Musical	Seesaw	Won
1977	Drama Desk Award	Outstanding Director of a Musical	The Club	Nominated
1978	Drama Desk Award	Outstanding Director of a Musical	The Best Little Whorehouse in Texas	Won
1978	Drama Desk Award	Outstanding Choreography	The Best Little Whorehouse in Texas	Nominated
1979	Tony Award	Best Direction of a Musical	The Best Little Whorehouse in Texas	Nominated
1979	Tony Award	Best Choreography	The Best Little Whorehouse in Texas	Nominated
1980	Tony Award	Best Direction of a Musical	A Day in Hollywood / A Night in the Ukraine	Nominated
1980	Tony Award	Best Choreography	A Day in Hollywood / A Night in the Ukraine	Won
1980	Drama Desk Award	Outstanding Choreography	A Day in Hollywood / A Night in the Ukraine	Won
1980	Outer Critics Circle Award	Outstanding Director	A Day in Hollywood / A Night in the Ukraine	Won
1980	Outer Critics Circle Award	Outstanding Choreography	A Day in Hollywood / A Night in the Ukraine	Won
1982	Tony Award	Best Direction of a Musical	Nine	Won
1982	Tony Award	Best Choreography	Nine	Nominated
1982	Drama Desk Award	Outstanding Director of a Musical	Nine	Won
1982	Drama Desk Award	Outstanding Director of a Play	Cloud 9	Won
1983	Tony Award	Best Performance by a Leading Actor in a Musical	My One and Only	Won
1983	Tony Award	Best Direction of a Musical	My One and Only	Nominated
1983	Tony Award	Best Choreography	My One and Only	Won
1983	Drama Desk Award	Outstanding Choreography	My One and Only	Won
1990	Tony Award	Best Direction of a Musical	Grand Hotel	Won
1990	Tony Award	Best Choreography	Grand Hotel	Won
1990	Drama Desk Award	Outstanding Director of a Musical	Grand Hotel	Won
1990	Drama Desk Award	Outstanding Choreography	Grand Hotel	Won
1990	Outer Critics Circle Award	Outstanding Director	Grand Hotel	Nominated
1991	Tony Award	Best Direction of a Musical	The Will Rogers Follies	Won
1991	Tony Award	Best Choreography	The Will Rogers Follies	Won
1991	Drama Desk Award	Outstanding Choreography	The Will Rogers Follies	Won
1992	Outer Critics Circle Award	Outstanding Choreography	The Will Rogers Follies	Nominated
2003	Drama Desk Award	Outstanding Choreography	Tommy Tune: White Tie and Tails	Nominated
2015	Tony Award		Lifetime Achievement Award	Won

=== Other recognition ===
- 1994 – Golden Plate Award of the American Academy of Achievement
- 2009 – National Museum of Dance and Hall of Fame

=== In other media ===
- Tune is a common reference in the 2022 Netflix original Murderville.
- Tune is mentioned in the Seinfeld episode "The Non-Fat Yogurt" by Frank Costanza.

== See also ==
- List of Tony Award records
