= Boy Wanted =

Song by George and Ira Gershwin

"Boy Wanted" is a 1921 song composed by George Gershwin, with lyrics by Ira Gershwin. It was introduced in the musical A Dangerous Maid (1921). In his 1997 book Ira Gershwin: The Art of the Lyricist, Philip Furia describes "Boy Wanted" as featuring "by far the most ambitious lyric" in A Dangerous Maid and likens it to a "catalogue song" reminiscent of the work of Gilbert and Sullivan. The lyrics recount the efforts of four girls describing the ideal qualities of a future partner in the style of a newspaper advertisement.

The song was reused by the Gershwins for the 1924 British musical Primrose, now as a solo number rather than a quartet. Ira had heavily revised the lyric in the three years since he had written it, and Furia felt this reflected his evolution from an "apprentice to a journeyman lyricist". Desmond Carter, the primary lyricist for Primrose, contributed to the revised lyrics.

Musicologist David Schiff has written that the essence of "Boy Wanted" was its "simplicity". Schiff felt the song was less obviously syncopated than the Gershwins previous efforts yet still "keeps the voice off the downbeat". Howard Pollack has written that the song's "remarkable main theme floats pentatonically over the range of an octave, as if untethered to any meter."

== Notable recordings ==
- Ella Fitzgerald - Ella Fitzgerald Sings the George and Ira Gershwin Songbook (1959) (first recording)
