= (I've Got) Beginner's Luck =

1937 song by George and Ira Gershwin

Song by Fred Astaire
- B-side: "They Can't Take That Away from Me"
- Published: February 27, 1937 by Gershwin Publishing Corp., New York
- Released: April 1937
- Recorded: March 18, 1937
- Studio: Los Angeles, California
- Genre: Jazz, Pop Vocal
- Label: Brunswick 7855
- Composer(s): George Gershwin
- Lyricist(s): Ira Gershwin

Fred Astaire singles chronology
| "Never Gonna Dance" (1936) | "(I've Got) Beginner's Luck" (1937) | "They All Laughed" (1937) |

"(I've Got) Beginner's Luck" is a song composed by George Gershwin, with lyrics by Ira Gershwin, written for the 1937 film Shall We Dance, it was introduced by Fred Astaire. It is a brief comic tap solo with cane where Astaire's rehearsing to a record of the number is cut short when the record gets stuck. Astaire's commercial recording for Brunswick (No. 7855) was very popular in 1937.

== Other notable recordings ==
- Ella Fitzgerald - Ella Fitzgerald Sings the George and Ira Gershwin Songbook (1959)
