= I Was Doing All Right =

"I Was Doing All Right" is a song composed by George Gershwin, with lyrics by Ira Gershwin. It was introduced by Ella Logan (unseen, on the radio) in the 1938 film The Goldwyn Follies.

== Notable recordings ==
- Ella Logan - recorded on December 30, 1937 for Brunswick Records (catalog No. 8064).
- Jimmy Dorsey & His Orchestra - recorded for Decca Records (catalog No. 1660B) on January 25, 1938.
- Ella Fitzgerald – recorded January 25, 1938 for Decca Records (catalog No. 1669) and later for Ella Fitzgerald Sings the George and Ira Gershwin Songbook (1959).
- Artie Shaw & his Orchestra - recorded on July 21, 1945 for RCA Victor (catalog No. 20-1742).
- Buddy DeFranco and Oscar Peterson - on their Buddy DeFranco and Oscar Peterson Play George Gershwin (1954)
- Carmen McRae - for her album Blue Moon (1956).
- Louis Armstrong w/ Oscar Peterson – Louis Armstrong Meets Oscar Peterson (1957).
- Dexter Gordon, on his 1961 album Doin' Allright.
- Susannah McCorkle - Someone to Watch Over Me—Songs of George Gershwin (1998).
- Diana Krall - From This Moment On (2006).
- The Longines Symphonette - A George Gershwin Festival
