= You've Got What Gets Me =

"You've Got What Gets Me" is a song composed by George Gershwin, with lyrics by Ira Gershwin, written for the 1932 film Girl Crazy.

== Notable recordings ==
- Ella Fitzgerald - Ella Fitzgerald Sings the George and Ira Gershwin Songbook (1959) (first recording)
