= Of Thee I Sing (song) =

1931 song by George and Ira Gershwin

"Of Thee I Sing" is a 1931 song composed by George Gershwin, with lyrics by Ira Gershwin.

It was introduced by William Gaxton and Lois Moran in the 1931 Pulitzer Prize winning musical Of Thee I Sing.

== Notable recordings ==
- Ben Selvin & His Orchestra - their recording for Columbia Records was a hit in 1932.
- Sarah Vaughan - Sarah Vaughan Sings George Gershwin (EmArcy, 1957)
- The Andrews Sisters - for their album Fresh and Fancy Free (1957, Capitol).
- Ella Fitzgerald - Ella Fitzgerald Sings the George and Ira Gershwin Songbook (1959)
- Johnny Mathis - Broadway (1964)
- Michael Feinstein – Michael & George: Feinstein Sings Gershwin (1998)
