= Isn't It a Pity? =

"Isn't It a Pity?" is a song composed by George Gershwin, with lyrics by Ira Gershwin, written for the unsuccessful 1933 musical Pardon My English. It was introduced by George Givot and Josephine Huston.

== Notable recordings ==
- Victor Arden - Phil Ohman & Their Orchestra (vocal by Scrappy Lambert) - recorded on December 8, 1932, for Victor Records (catalog No. 24206).
  - Eddy Duchin & His Central Park Casino Orchestra - recorded on January 18, 1933, for Brunswick Records (catalog No. 6476).
- Sarah Vaughan - Sarah Vaughan Sings George Gershwin (EmArcy, 1958)
- Ella Fitzgerald - Ella Fitzgerald Sings the George and Ira Gershwin Songbook (1959)
- Mitzi Gaynor - Mitzi Gaynor Sings the Lyrics of Ira Gershwin (Verve, 1959).
- Beverly Kenney - Born to be Blue (1959).
- Mabel Mercer - Once in a Blue Moon (1959)
- Johnny Mathis - The Rhythms and Ballads of Broadway (1960)
- Mel Tormé - That's All (1965), and Mel Tormé and Friends (1981).
- Carol Sloane - But Not For Me (1986)
- Michael Feinstein w/ Rosemary Clooney - Pure Gershwin (Parnassus, 1985; Asylum, 1987)
- Mel Tormé and Cleo Laine - Nothing Without You (1992)
- Shirley Horn - Here's to Life (1992)
- Barbra Streisand - A Love Like Ours (1999)
- Stacey Kent - Dreamsville (2001)
- Russell Watson and Victoria Hart - The Lost Gershwin (2008).
