= Love Is Sweeping the Country =

Song

"Love Is Sweeping the Country" is a song composed by George Gershwin, with lyrics by Ira Gershwin. It was premiered by George Murphy and June O'Dea in the 1931 musical Of Thee I Sing.

== Notable recordings ==
- Ella Fitzgerald – Ella Fitzgerald Sings the George and Ira Gershwin Song Book (1959)
