= Somebody from Somewhere =

Song composed by George Gershwin

"Somebody from Somewhere" is a 1931 song composed by George Gershwin, with lyrics by Ira Gershwin.

It was written for the film Delicious (1931), where it was introduced by Janet Gaynor and a whiskey bottle.

== Notable recordings ==
- Ella Fitzgerald - Ella Fitzgerald Sings the George and Ira Gershwin Songbook (1959) (first recording)
