= Lorelei (George Gershwin song) =

1933 song by George and Ira Gershwin

"The Lorelei" is a song composed by George Gershwin, with lyrics by Ira Gershwin; it was written for their musical Pardon My English (1933).

It is about the Lorelei legend.

The lyrics of "The Lorelei" are transcribed by Ira Gershwin in Lyrics on Several Occasions.

== Notable recordings ==
- Sarah Vaughan - Sarah Vaughan Sings George Gershwin (1958)
- Ella Fitzgerald - Ella Fitzgerald Sings the George and Ira Gershwin Song Book (1959, studio performance)
- Ella Fitzgerald - Ella in Berlin: Mack the Knife (1960, live performance)
- Liza Minnelli - It Amazes Me (1965)
