= Stiff Upper Lip (Gershwin song) =

"Stiff Upper Lip" is a 1937 song composed by George Gershwin, with lyrics by Ira Gershwin. It references the British expression 'Stiff upper lip'.

It was introduced by Gracie Allen in the 1937 film A Damsel in Distress. The song is the occasion for an elaborate dance routine performed inside a funhouse by Fred Astaire, George Burns, and Miss Allen, and makes full use of all the trappings of the house, including the funhouse mirror. The number won an Academy Award for Best Dance Direction.

== Notable recordings ==
- Ella Fitzgerald - Ella Fitzgerald Sings the George and Ira Gershwin Songbook (1959)
