= My Cousin in Milwaukee =

"My Cousin in Milwaukee" is a song composed by George Gershwin with lyrics by Ira Gershwin. It was introduced in their 1932 musical Pardon My English. The song, like the show, was not a particular hit, although there are a number of vintage recordings of it:

- Victor Arden-Phil Ohman & their Orchestra (Victor 24206)
- Lyda Roberti+ with Eddy Duchin and his Central Park Casino Orchestra (Brunswick unissued)

(+ There has been an ongoing debate about the vocalist by collectors. Many people believe the singer is Gertrude Neisen, who was known for her accurate impersonation of Roberti.)

== Notable recordings ==
- Ella Fitzgerald - Ella Fitzgerald Sings the George and Ira Gershwin Songbook (1959)
- Arnetia Walker, complete score recording of "Pardon My English", 1994 Roxbury/Electra/Nonesuch
