= I Can't Be Bothered Now =

Song by Fred Astaire
- B-side: "A Foggy Day"
- Published: September 16, 1937 by Gershwin Publishing Corp., New York
- Released: November 1937
- Recorded: October 17, 1937
- Studio: Los Angeles, California
- Genre: Jazz, Pop Vocal
- Label: Brunswick 7982
- Composer: George Gershwin
- Lyricist: Ira Gershwin

Fred Astaire singles chronology
"Let's Call the Whole Thing Off" (1937)	"I Can't Be Bothered Now" (1937)	"Nice Work If You Can Get It" (1937)

"I Can't Be Bothered Now" is a song composed by George Gershwin, with lyrics by Ira Gershwin, written for the 1937 film A Damsel In Distress, where it was introduced by Fred Astaire. In 1992, it was included in the musical Crazy for You.

== Notable recordings ==
- Ella Fitzgerald – Ella Fitzgerald Sings the George and Ira Gershwin Songbook (1959)
