= 'The Half of It, Dearie' Blues =

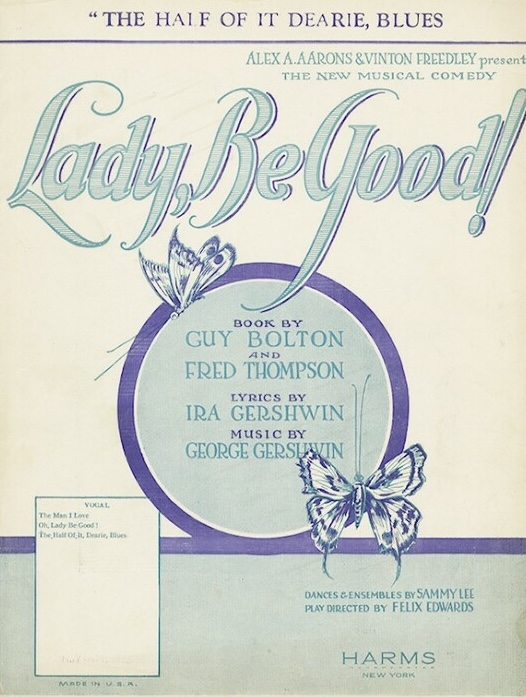

Song by Fred Astaire and Kathlene Martyn
- Published: December 1, 1924 Harms, Inc.
- Released: 1924
- Composer: George Gershwin
- Lyricist: Ira Gershwin

"'The Half of it, Dearie' Blues" is a song composed by George Gershwin, with lyrics by Ira Gershwin. It was introduced by Fred Astaire and Kathlene Martyn in the 1924 musical Lady be Good.

In his 1959 book Lyrics on Several Occasions, Ira Gershwin noted: "Some sort of grievance is featured in the musical-comedy adaptation of The Blues as evidence here in 'The Half of It, Dearie Blues' and in the [Jerome] Kern-[Anne] Caldwell 'Left All Alone Again Blues' (Note: Left All Alone Again Blues is from the 1920 musical The Night Boat.)—but of course in such as these the lyric approach isn't attempting to plumb the melancholy depths of the real Blues."

== Recordings ==
- Fred Astaire with George Gershwin at the piano - Fred Astaire - Complete London Sessions. In this first ever recording of the number, on April 19, 1926, Astaire includes a short tap-dancing section and asks Gershwin: "How's that, George," to which Gershwin replies: "That's fine, Freddy, keep going."
- Ella Fitzgerald - Ella Fitzgerald Sings the George and Ira Gershwin Songbook (1959)
