= My One and Only (1927 song) =

"My One and Only" is a song composed by George Gershwin, with lyrics by Ira Gershwin, written for the 1927 musical Funny Face where it was introduced by Fred Astaire, Betty Compton and Gertrude McDonald. It was originally titled "(What Am I Gonna Do) If You Turn Me Down?"

== Notable recordings ==
- Johnny Johnson & His Statler Pennsylvanians - Victor 21113; Matrix BVE-41134 (rec. December 2, 1927)
- Whispering Jack Smith - HMV B2863; Matrix Bb14510-3 (rec. September 18, 1928)
- Fred Astaire with Adele Astaire, orchestra conducted by Julian Jones, London, November 28, 1928 (English Columbia 5174)
- Lee Wiley - Sings the Songs of George & Ira Gershwin & Cole Porter (1940), Legendary Song Stylist (1999)
- Sarah Vaughan - Sarah Vaughan Sings George Gershwin (1957)
- Ella Fitzgerald - Ella Sings Gershwin (1950), Ella Fitzgerald Sings the George and Ira Gershwin Songbook (1959)
