= Lady, Be Good (musical) =

1924 musical written by Guy Bolton and Fred Thompson

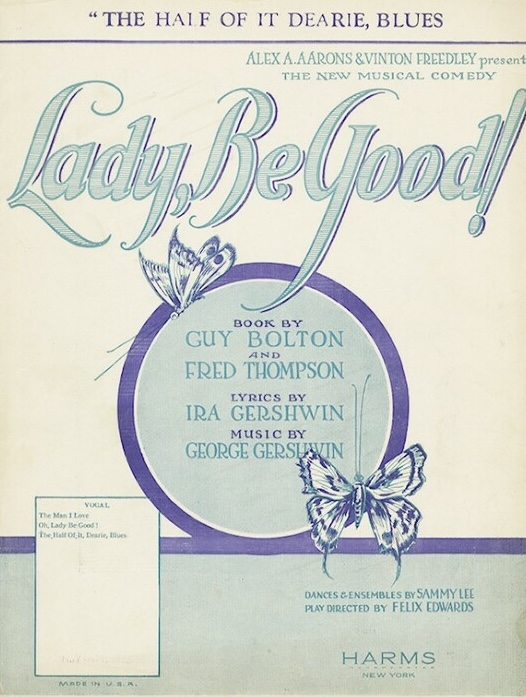
- Sheet music for "The Half of It, Dearie' Blues"
- Music: George Gershwin
- Lyrics: Ira Gershwin
- Book: Guy Bolton; Fred Thompson
- Productions: 1924 Broadway; 1926 West End; 2015 City Center Encores!

Lady, Be Good! (title sometimes presented with an exclamation point) is a musical written by Guy Bolton and Fred Thompson with music by George and lyrics by Ira Gershwin. It was first presented on Broadway in 1924; the West End production followed in 1926. The story of the musical is about a brother and sister who are out of money; both are eager to sacrifice themselves to help the other. This was the first Broadway collaboration of the Gershwin brothers, and the Astaire siblings play a brother-sister dance team.

== Productions ==
Fred and Adele Astaire perform "Swiss Miss" in the London production.

Lady, Be Good premiered on Broadway at the Liberty Theatre on December 1, 1924 and closed on September 12, 1925, after 330 performances. The musical was staged by Felix Edwardes with musical staging by Sammy Lee and scenic design by Norman Bel Geddes. It starred brother and sister performers Fred and Adele Astaire.

The musical opened in the West End at the Empire Theatre on April 14, 1926, again starring Fred and Adele Astaire. It played strongly there, running for 326 performances. The best-known songs from the score are "Oh, Lady be Good!" and "Fascinating Rhythm."

A staged concert production was presented by Encores! in 2015, directed by Mark Brokaw and choreographed by Randy Skinner. The production featured Tommy Tune in his well received return to the NY stage.

== Synopsis ==
Setting: Beacon Hill, Rhode Island and Eastern Harbor, Connecticut

Act I

The brother/sister dance team of Dick and Susie Trevor are so broke that they can't pay the rent and have been evicted from their childhood home. They crash the garden party of wealthy Jo Vanderwater for a free meal. Dick loves Shirley Vernon but is ashamed to pursue her because of his financial situation. Jo is interested in Dick, and it turns out that she was behind the eviction, as a ploy to get his attention. Meanwhile, Susie tries to talk herself into liking the affluent Jeff White, but she finds herself falling for Jack, a charming "hobo"; Jack leaves town.

Jack's uncle dies, and he is apparently a millionaire. Lawyer Watty Watkins is looking for Jack Robinson on behalf of his client, the flamboyant Manuel Estrada, who says that his sister married Mr. Robinson in Mexico. Watty offers Susie $50,000 to help him, by pretending to be Robinson's widow, to get the money from the Robinson estate. Meanwhile, Dick proposes to Jo, since he thinks he can never afford to court his true love Shirley.

Act 2

Dick finally tells Shirley that he loves her, while Watty and Susie (in disguise) execute their plan. Jack finally hears that he has inherited the fortune and returns, still dressed as a hobo. He is amazed to find Susie claiming the money as his "widow". Susie does not know that her Jack is the now-wealthy Mr. Robinson, nor that she is being used by Estrada, whose sister never really married Jack.

In the end, Dick and Shirley are reunited, Jack saves Susie from disgrace by declaring his love, and Jo and Watty pair off happily. All wed happily ever after.

== Songs ==
Act I

- "Hang on to Me" – Dick Trevor and Susie Trevor
- "A Wonderful Party" – Guests
- "End of a String" – Ensemble
- "We're Here Because" – Daisy Parke, Bertie Bassett and Guests
- "Fascinating Rhythm" – Susie Trevor, Dick Trevor and Jeff
- "So Am I" – Jack Robinson and Susie Trevor
- "Oh, Lady be Good!" – J. Watterson Watkins and Girls

Act II

- "Weatherman/Rainy Afternoon Girls" – Ensemble
- "The Half of It, Dearie' Blues" – Shirley Vernon and Dick Trevor
- "Juanita" – Susie Trevor and Boys
- "Leave It to Love" – Susie Trevor, Jack Robinson, Shirley Vernon and Dick Trevor
- "Little Jazz Bird" – Jeff
- "Insufficient Sweetie" (Music and Lyrics By Cliff Edwards and Gilbert Wells) – Jeff
- "Who Takes Care of the Caretaker's Daughter?" (Music and Lyrics By Chick Endor) –
- "It's All the Same to Me" (Music and Lyrics By Chick Endor) –
- "Carnival Time" – Ensemble
- "Swiss Miss" (Lyrics By Arthur Jackson and Ira Gershwin) – Susie Trevor and Dick Trevor

== Principal characters ==
- Dick Trevor: In Love with Shirley – Fred Astaire
- Susie Trevor: Dick's sister – Adele Astaire
- Shirley Vernon: Loves Dick – Kathlene Martyn
- Josephine Vanderwater: Also loves Dick – Jayne Auburn
- Jack Robinson: Disguised as a Hobo, in love with Susie – Alan Edwards
- Buck Benson: A go getter for Life Magazine –
- Sammy Cooper: Photographer –
- J. Watterson "Watty" Watkins: A Slick Lawyer – Walter Catlett
- Manuel Estrada – Bryan Lycan
- Rufus Parke: Trustee – James Bradbury
- Daisy Parke – Patricia Clarke
- Jeff: The Butler – Cliff Edwards
- Bertie Bassett: Assistant to the Sheriff – Gerald Oliver Smith
- Flunkey (Jenkins) – Edward Jephson
- Victor Arden – Victor Arden
- Phil Ohman – Phil Ohman

== Film versions ==
Two films under this title were produced: a 1928 silent film and a 1941 film. The former film is now considered a lost film. The latter film, starring Eleanor Powell, uses only the title number, "Oh, Lady Be Good!," and "Fascinating Rhythm" from the musical.

== Legacy ==
The show title was used on an American B-24D Liberator bomber that flew for the United States Army Air Forces during World War II out of North Africa. Lady Be Good disappeared on an April 4, 1943, during a raid on Naples, Italy. It was found virtually intact in the Libyan desert in 1958.
