= Bidin' My Time =

Song by George and Ira Gershwin

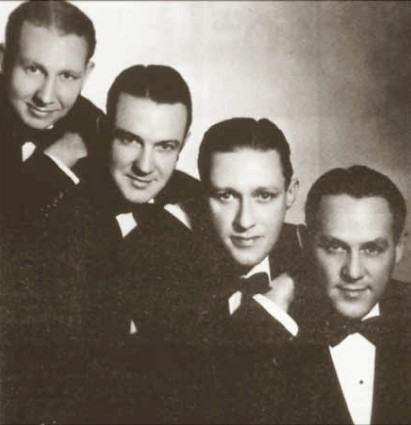
Image of the Foursome

"Bidin' My Time" is a song composed by George Gershwin, with lyrics by Ira Gershwin. It was introduced by The Foursome ( Del Porter, Ray Johnson, J. Marshall and Dwight Snyder) in the 1930 musical Girl Crazy. Not to be confused with the Anne Murray song Bidin' My Time from 1969 written by Gene MacLellan.

== Notable recordings ==
- Judy Garland - recorded November 4, 1943 for Decca Records, catalog No. 23310.
- Teddi King - from "Bidin' My Time" (1956, RCA).
- Margaret Whiting - a single release in 1956.
- Sarah Vaughan - Sarah Vaughan Sings George Gershwin (1958)
- Ella Fitzgerald - Ella Fitzgerald Sings the George and Ira Gershwin Songbook (1959)
- Nat King Cole - Let's Face the Music! (1964), and also included in the compilation set L-O-V-E: The Complete Capitol Recordings 1960–1964.
