= The Goldwyn Follies =

1938 film by George Marshall

- One of theatrical release posters
- Directed by: George Marshall
- Written by: Ben Hecht
- Produced by: Samuel Goldwyn; George Haight
- Starring: Adolphe Menjou; The Ritz Brothers; Vera Zorina; Andrea Leeds; Edgar Bergen
- Cinematography: Gregg Toland
- Edited by: Sherman Todd
- Music by: George Gershwin Vernon Duke
- Production company: Samuel Goldwyn Productions
- Distributed by: United Artists
- Release date: February 4, 1938
- Running time: 122 minutes
- Country: United States
- Language: English
- Budget: $2 million

The Goldwyn Follies is a 1938 Technicolor film written by Ben Hecht, Sid Kuller, Sam Perrin and Arthur Phillips, with music by George Gershwin, Vernon Duke and Ray Golden, and lyrics by Ira Gershwin and Sid Kuller. The film was the first Technicolor feature produced by Samuel Goldwyn.

The film, which features Adolphe Menjou, Vera Zorina, Edgar Bergen (with Charlie McCarthy), Andrea Leeds, Kenny Baker, Ella Logan, Helen Jepson, Bobby Clark and the Ritz Brothers, depicts a movie producer who chooses a simple girl to be "Miss Humanity" and to critically evaluate his films from the point of view of the ordinary person. The style of the film is very similar to that of other musicals of its era, including the Gold Diggers series. George Gershwin had not completed the score before his death July in 1937; Vernon Duke finished the songs with Ira Gershwin and wrote the ballet music.

The Goldwyn Follies was released in February 1938. It was nominated for an Academy Award for Best Score as orchestrated by Edward B. Powell under the musical direction of Alfred Newman, as well as for Best Interior Decoration.

== Cast ==
- Adolphe Menjou as Oliver Merlin (as Adolph Menjou)
- The Ritz Brothers as Themselves
- Vera Zorina as Olga Samara
- Kenny Baker as Danny Beecher
- Andrea Leeds as Hazel Dawes
- Edgar Bergen as Himself
- Charlie McCarthy as Himself
- Helen Jepson as Leona Jerome
- Phil Baker as Michael Day
- Bobby Clark as A. Basil Crane Jr.
- Ella Logan as Glory Wood
- Jerome Cowan as Director Lawrence
- Charles Kullmann as Alfredo in La Traviata
- The American Ballet of the Metropolitan Opera as Ballet Dancers
- Nydia Westman as Ada
- Alan Ladd as First Auditioning Singer (uncredited)
- Francis Xavier Shields Assistant Director (uncredited)

== Soundtrack ==
Songs include (music by George Gershwin and lyrics by Ira Gershwin unless otherwise indicated):

- "Love Is Here to Stay"
- "I Was Doing All Right"
- "Spring Again" (music by Vernon Duke)
- "Love Walked In"
- "I Love to Rhyme"
- "Here Pussy, Pussy (Where's the Gosh-Darn Cat?)" (music by Ray Golden, lyrics by Sid Kuller)

== Reception ==
The film was nominated for the American Film Institute's 2006 list AFI's Greatest Movie Musicals.

However, the film was also included in the 1978 book The Fifty Worst Films of All Time (and How They Got That Way) by Harry Medved, Randy Dreyfuss and Michael Medved.
