= John McGowan (playwright) =

American dramatist

John McGowan, also known by his nickname Jack McGowan, (January 12, 1894, Muskego, Wisconsin – May 28, 1977, New York City) was an American playwright, librettist, screenwriter, director and producer. His 1927 Broadway play Excess Baggage was adapted into the 1928 film of the same name. He died in New York City on May 28, 1977.

== Selected credits ==
- Say When, Producer and Book
- Pardon My English, Book Director
- Earl Carroll's Vanities of 1932, Book
- Heigh-ho, Everybody, Writer
- Singin' the Blues, Writer
- Girl Crazy, Book
- Flying High, Book
- Nigger Rich (The Big Shot), Writer and Director
- Murray Anderson's Almanac, Book
- The Lady Lies, Producer
- Hold Everything!, Book
- Excess Baggage, Writer
- Tenth Avenue, Writer
