= A Dangerous Maid =

Musical by Charles William Bell and George and Ira Gershwin

- Original sheet music cover
- Music: George Gershwin
- Lyrics: Ira Gershwin
- Book: Charles William Bell
- Basis: A Dislocated Honeymoon by Charles William Bell
- Productions: 1923 Broadway

A Dangerous Maid is a musical with a book by Charles William Bell, music by George Gershwin and lyrics by Ira Gershwin (writing under the pseudonym "Arthur Francis"). The script is based on Bell's 1918 play A Dislocated Honeymoon. The story concerns an ex-showgirl who elopes with a society boy, but his family tries to break up the marriage. The Gershwins wrote ten songs for the musical, eight of which were used in the production, which premiered in Atlantic City, New Jersey, on March 21, 1921. It toured through several cities and ended in Pittsburgh, Pennsylvania, where it closed on April 16, 1921.

The show was George Gershwin's second book musical and his first full score written with his brother Ira. The book is believed to be lost. The show is one of the few Gershwin musicals that never made it to Broadway. The book was revised and retitled Elsie and, later, entirely new music was written for it by Eubie Blake and others. This version was produced on Broadway in April 1923. Even though Elsie ran for only 40 performances, it made history as a rare early example of black songwriters writing for white performers. No one knows why director Edgar MacGregor abandoned the Gershwin score. Several of the songs were later reused, and Ella Fitzgerald had a success in 1959 with her recording of "Boy Wanted".

== Plot ==
Elsie Crofton, age eighteen, is a former chorus girl. She has given up the stage to elope with wealthy, spoiled, but good-hearted Harry Hammond, the son of a government contractor. Harry's parents, Phillip and Eleanor, his sister Margery and her fiancé Fred Blakely consider Elsie dangerous to their social position and oppose the marriage. They arrange for Harry to go to a family construction site, to interrupt the honeymoon, and send Elsie to stay at their summer home, where their family friends Alfie and Anne Westford are also staying.

The family plans to destroy the marriage by placing Elsie in a compromising position with the willing and eager Fred. Anne also reveals her prejudices against Elsie. Elsie soon grasps the situation and decides to take action. She flirts with all the men, which dismays her visiting husband, but she gains the sympathies of Phillip, Fred and Alfie. Eleanor, Margery and Anne are furious, but Elsie reveals their scheme, and everybody reconciles.

== Song list ==
Surviving songs from A Dangerous Maid

- Just to Know You are Mine – Elsie
- Some Rain Must Fall – Elsie
- The Simple Life – Elsie and Fred Blakely
- Dancing Shoes – Elsie and Fred
- Boy Wanted – Chorus Girls
- The Sirens – Chorus Girls
- Anything for You – Fred and Margery

Songs from Elsie
Act 1

- A Regular Guy – Parker and Girls
- One Day in May – Girls
- Hearts in Tune – Harry Hammond and Elsie
- Elsie – Elsie
- My Crinoline Girl – Harry, Elsie, Girls and Four Crinoline Girl Dancers

Act 2

- I'd Like to Walk with a Pal Like You – Elsie and Fred
- Two Lips Are Roses – Fred, Girls and Four Crinoline Girl Dancers
- Baby Bunting – Margery Hammond and Fred
- Honeymoon Home – Harry, Elsie and Girls
- Sand Flowers – Elsie and Girls

Act 3

- The Firefly – Elsie, Bunny and Girls
- Symphonic Poem – Alfie Westford (music by Gene Salzer)
- Everybody's Strutting Now – Fred, Margery and Girls
- Thunderstorm Jazz – Anne Westford, Alfie, Margery, Fred, Girls and Four Goblins
- Clouds of Love – Elsie

== Productions ==
A Dangerous Maid debuted in Atlantic City on March 21, 1921, with the production designed by the Robert Law Studios and staged by Edgar MacGregor, with help from Eddie Leonard and Julian Alfred and musical direction by Harold Vicars. The show featured Juliette Day as Elsie, Creighton Hale as Harry, Frederic Burt as Philip, Amelia Bingham as Eleanor, Juanita Fletcher as Margery, Vinton Freedley as Fred, Arthur Shaw as Alfie, and Ada Meade as Anne. After Atlantic City, the show toured through Wilmington, Delaware, Baltimore, Maryland, Washington, D.C., and Pittsburgh, Pennsylvania, receiving warm reviews. During the tour, Vivienne Segal replaced Juliette Day and MacGregor renamed the show Elsie. When the tour closed, MacGregor announced the show would be revised before any Broadway run.

Two years later, the show finally made it to Broadway, retaining the name Elsie, but with a rewritten book and a new score by Noble Sissle and Eubie Blake. Extra numbers were contributed by Alma Sanders and Monte Carlo. Elsie ran for 40 performances. Freedley played Harry this time, Burt and Meade returned as Philip and Anne, Stanley Ridges played Fred, Maude Turner Gordon played Eleanor, and Marguerite Zender was Elsie.

== In popular culture ==
In Season 2 of the television series Boardwalk Empire, Episode 3 takes its name from this musical, as a character rehearses for a role in A Dangerous Maid.
