= Fascinating Rhythm =

Song composed by George Gershwin with lyrics by Ira Gershwin performed by Cliff Edwards

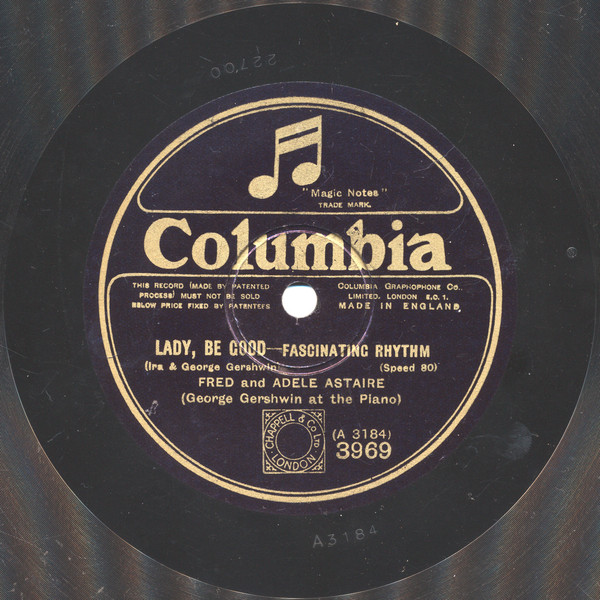

Song by Fred Astaire and Adele Astaire with George Gershwin
- Published: December 12, 1924 Harms, Inc.
- Released: June 1926
- Recorded: April 19, 1926
- Studio: London, UK
- Label: Columbia DB 3968
- Composer: George Gershwin
- Lyricist: Ira Gershwin

"Fascinating Rhythm" is a popular song written by George Gershwin in 1924 with lyrics by Ira Gershwin.

It was first introduced by Cliff Edwards, Fred Astaire and Adele Astaire in the Broadway musical Lady Be Good. The Astaires also recorded the song on April 19, 1926, in London with George Gershwin on the piano (English Columbia 3968 or 8969).

The song provided the music for a famous dance sequence by Eleanor Powell in the movie Lady Be Good.

Many recorded versions exist. One of the rarest recordings is by Joe Bari (a pseudonym of Anthony Dominick Benedetto, later better known as Tony Bennett) for Leslie Records in 1949 and issued as catalog number 919 with "Vieni Qui" as the flip side. Having rerecorded it as a duet with Diana Krall in 2018 for their duet album Love Is Here to Stay, he currently holds the Guinness World Record for the "longest time between the release of an original recording and a re-recording of the same single by the same artist".

"Fascinating Rhythm" inspired the riff to the 1974 Deep Purple song "Burn".

The 1926 Astaire/Gershwin version and a 1938 version by Hawaiian steel guitarist Sol Hoʻopiʻi have both been added to the Library of Congress's National Recording Registry of "culturally, historically, or aesthetically important" American sound recordings.

== Recorded versions ==
- Maxene Andrews
- Victor Arden and Phil Ohman (piano roll duet)
- Fred Astaire and Adele Astaire with George Gershwin on piano - rec. April 19, 1926 - released on Columbia 3969 (WA 3184–1)
- Fred Astaire - rec. December 1952
- Tony Bennett (1949, as Joe Bari, re-recorded in 2018)
- Louis Bellson - rec. February 1954 - released on the LP The Amazing Artistry of Louis Bellson
- Georgia Brown
- The Carpenters 1976
- Petula Clark 1954
- Rosemary Clooney 1980
- Jacob Collier
- Zez Confrey (piano roll)
- Come Shine
- Xavier Cugat 1962
- Jamie Cullum
- Vic Damone
- Tommy Dorsey And His Orchestra - rec. January 12, 1943 - from the movie Girl Crazy (1943)
- Cliff "Ukulele Ike" Edwards - rec. December 18, 1924 - released as Perfect 115690, matrix 105713-2
- Les Elgart 1956
- Percy Faith 1957
- Michael Feinstein
- Ella Fitzgerald - Ella Fitzgerald Sings the George and Ira Gershwin Songbook (1959)
- Wayne Fontana 1965
- The Four Tops 1999
- Judy Garland
- Jack Gibbons
- Benny Goodman
- Stephane Grappelli
- Dave Grusin 1991
- Vince Guaraldi Trio (1956)
- Scott Hamilton - Live At Brecon Jazz Festival, 1995
- Ted Heath
- The Hi-Lo's
- Earl Hines 1964
- Sol Hoʻopiʻi
- Dick Hyman
- Antonio Carlos Jobim - recorded on the LP Passarim (1987)
- Salena Jones
- Stan Kenton 1953
- Morgana King - rec. 1964 - released on the LP A Taste of Honey
- Guillermo Klein - Una Nave (2005)
- Lee Konitz
- André Kostelanetz
- Cleo Laine
- Sam Lanin and His Roseland Orchestra - December 24, 1924 - Columbia 279-D
- Enoch Light
- Herbie Mann
- Billy May
- Susannah McCorkle
- Maureen McGovern 1989
- Jane Monheit and Mark O'Connor 2003
- Mark Murphy 1956
- Red Norvo 1956
- Virginia O'Brien
- Art Pepper
- Oscar Peterson
- Eleanor Powell - (1940s film Lady Be Good)
- John Pizzarelli
- André Previn 1998
- Buddy Rich 1961
- Freddie Rich (piano roll)
- George Shearing 1989
- Stuff Smith
- The Spinners
- Tommy Steele 1984
- Claude Thornhill
- Mel Tormé 1956
- Leslie Uggams 1962
- Caterina Valente
- Dianne Reeves 2001
- Sarah Vaughan - rec. August 15, 1964 and Gershwin Live!, 1982
- The Real Group, LandesJugendJazzOrchester Hessen, Kicks & Sticks 2018
- Paul Whiteman Orchestra - December 29, 1924 - Victor 19551
