= A Foggy Day =

1937 song by George Gershwin

Song by Fred Astaire
- B-side: "I Can't Be Bothered Now"
- Published: September 16, 1937 by Gershwin Publishing Corp., New York
- Released: November 1937
- Recorded: October 17, 1937
- Studio: Los Angeles, California
- Genre: Jazz, Pop Vocal
- Label: Brunswick 7982
- Composer: George Gershwin
- Lyricist: Ira Gershwin

Fred Astaire singles chronology
"Let's Call the Whole Thing Off" (1937)	"A Foggy Day" (1937)	"Nice Work If You Can Get It" (1937)

"A Foggy Day" is a popular song composed by George Gershwin, with lyrics by Ira Gershwin. The song was introduced by Fred Astaire in the 1937 film A Damsel in Distress. It was originally titled "A Foggy Day (In London Town)" in reference to the pollution-induced pea soup fogs that were common in London during that period, and is often still referred to by the full title.
The commercial recording by Astaire for Brunswick was very popular in 1937.

== Other recordings ==
- Frank Sinatra – Songs for Young Lovers (1953)
- Carmen McRae – A Foggy Day with Carmen McRae (1955)
- Bud Powell – Bud Powell's Moods (1956)
- Charles Mingus – Pithecanthropus Erectus (1956)
- Louis Armstrong with Ella Fitzgerald – Ella and Louis (1956)
- Billie Holiday – Songs for Distingué Lovers (1957)
- Ella Fitzgerald on her Ella Fitzgerald Sings the George and Ira Gershwin Song Book from Verve Records, 1959, and on Nice Work If You Can Get It (1983)
- Red Garland – Red Garland at the Prelude (1959)
- Frank Sinatra — Ring-a-Ding-Ding! (1961)
- Judy Garland — Judy at Carnegie Hall (1961)
- George Benson – It's Uptown (1965)
- Sarah Vaughan – Live in Japan (1973)
- Lyn Collins – Check Me Out if You Don't Know Me By Now (1975)
- Wynton Marsalis – Marsalis Standard Time, Volume 1 (1987)
- Tony Bennett – MTV Unplugged (1994)
- David Bowie – Red Hot + Rhapsody: The Gershwin Groove (1998)
- Michael Bublé – It's Time (2005)
- Willie Nelson – My Way (2018)

== See also ==
- List of 1930s jazz standards
