= Howard Pollack =

American pianist and musicologist (born 1952)

Howard Pollack (born March 17, 1952) is an American pianist and musicologist, known for his biographies of American composers.

== Biography ==
Pollack was born in Brooklyn and studied piano while attending James Madison High School. He continued his piano studies at the University of Michigan, where he received his Bachelor of Music in 1973; and at the Aspen Music Festival in 1970. He received a Master of Arts degree (1977) and Ph.D. (1981) in musicology from Cornell University, where he wrote his thesis, "Walter Piston and His Music", under the supervision of William Austin. He also studied composition privately with Samuel Adler in Rochester.

After serving on the faculties of the Rochester Institute of Technology, Cornell University, and Empire State College, Pollack joined the faculty of the University of Houston in 1987, becoming John and Rebecca Moores Professor of Music in 2005.

Pollack's books include biographies of Walter Piston, John Alden Carpenter, Aaron Copland, George Gershwin, and Marc Blitzstein. In addition, he co-edited, with Claus Reschke, German Literature and Music: An Aesthetic Fusion (1890–1989) (1992). He also has published articles on Joseph Haydn, Victor Herbert, Charles Griffes, Samuel Barber, and Carlisle Floyd.

Pollack received the Deems Taylor Award from ASCAP (2000) and the Irving Lowens Award from the Society for American Music (2001) for Aaron Copland and an Award for Excellence in Historical Recorded Sound Research from the Association for Recorded Sound Collections (2007) and another Deems Taylor Award (2008) for George Gershwin. His other awards include grants from the National Endowment for the Humanities, the Kurt Weill Foundation for Music, the Newberry Library, the American Musicological Society, and the Society for American Music.

Pollack is a professor at the Moores School of Music of the University of Houston.

== Bibliography ==
- Walter Piston (1982)
- Harvard Composers: Walter Piston and his Students, from Elliott Carter to Frederic Rzewski (1992)
- John Alden Carpenter: A Chicago Composer (1995)
- Aaron Copland: The Life and Work of an Uncommon Man (1999)
- George Gershwin: His Life and Work (University of California Press, 2006); ISBN 978-0-520-24864-9
- Marc Blitzstein: His Life, His Work, His World (Oxford University Press, 2012)
- The Ballad of John Latouche: An American Lyricist's Life and Work (Oxford University Press, 2017)
- Samuel Barber: His Life & Legacy (University of Illinois Press, 2023)
