= Nice Work If You Can Get It (song) =

1937 song by George and Ira Gershwin

Song by Fred Astaire
- B-side: Things Are Looking Up
- Published: September 16, 1937 by Gershwin Publishing Corp., New York
- Released: November 1937
- Recorded: October 17, 1937
- Studio: Los Angeles, California
- Genre: Jazz
- Label: Brunswick 7983
- Composer: George Gershwin
- Lyricist: Ira Gershwin

Fred Astaire singles chronology
"A Foggy Day" (1937)	"Nice Work If You Can Get It" (1937)	"Change Partners" (1938)

"Nice Work If You Can Get It" is a popular song and jazz standard composed by George Gershwin, with lyrics by Ira Gershwin.

== Background ==
The song began life in 1930 as a nine-bar phrase with the working title "There's No Stopping Me Now". Its title phrase "Nice work if you can get it" came from an English magazine. It was one of nine songs the Gershwin brothers wrote for the movie A Damsel in Distress in which it was performed by Fred Astaire with backing vocals by The Stafford Sisters. The song was published in 1937.

== First recordings ==
The first jazz recording of the work was by Tommy Dorsey three weeks after the release of the film. Early chart versions were by Shep Fields, Teddy Wilson with Billie Holiday, Fred Astaire (with the Ray Noble Orchestra), Maxine Sullivan, and The Andrews Sisters. The song was recorded by many jazz singers and adopted by bebop instrumentalists; Jerry Newman recorded pianist Thelonious Monk performing the tune in 1941 at Minton's Playhouse, a nightclub closely connected with early bebop, and he subsequently recorded it several times.

== Other recordings ==
- Tommy Dorsey – 1937
- Billie Holiday with Teddy Wilson – 1937
- Thelonious Monk – 1941, 1947
- Art Tatum – 1949
- Sarah Vaughan with Jimmy Jones music director; and Percy Faith arranger and conductor – Sarah Vaughan in Hi-Fi (1955)
- Mel Tormé – Mel Tormé Sings Fred Astaire (1956)
- Frank Sinatra – A Swingin' Affair! (1957) and Sinatra-Basie: An Historic Musical First (1962)
- Erroll Garner – Erroll Garner Plays Gershwin and Kern, 1968
- Ella Fitzgerald with Andre Previn – Nice Work If You Can Get It, 1983

== Popular culture ==
- In the 1951 film An American in Paris, the song is performed by Georges Guétary.
- A version of this song was used during the opening credits of the 1995 to 1998 CBS sitcom Cybill, starring Cybill Shepherd, who performed the song.
- The song was included in the Tony Award-winning Broadway musical Crazy for You and lent its name to the musical Nice Work If You Can Get It.

== See also ==
- List of 1930s jazz standards
