= A Damsel in Distress (1937 film) =

1937 film by George Stevens

- Theatrical release poster
- Directed by: George Stevens
- Screenplay by: P. G. Wodehouse; Ernest Pagano; S. K. Lauren
- Based on: A Damsel in Distress by P. G. Wodehouse
- Produced by: Pandro S. Berman
- Starring: Fred Astaire; George Burns; Gracie Allen; Joan Fontaine; Reginald Gardiner; Ray Noble; Constance Collier; Montagu Love; Harry Watson
- Cinematography: Joseph H. August
- Edited by: Henry Berman
- Music by: George Gershwin (songs); Victor Baravalle (musical direction)
- Production company: RKO Radio Pictures
- Distributed by: RKO Radio Pictures
- Release date: November 19, 1937
- Running time: 98 minutes
- Country: United States
- Language: English
- Budget: $1,035,000
- Box office: $1,465,000

A Damsel in Distress is a 1937 American musical romantic comedy film directed by George Stevens and starring Fred Astaire, George Burns, Gracie Allen, and Joan Fontaine. Based on the 1919 novel by P. G. Wodehouse, it has music and lyrics by George and Ira Gershwin.

== Plot ==
The staff at Totleigh Castle know that the lovely Lady Alyce Marshmorton must marry soon and wager on whom the groom will be. With all of the likely candidates already claimed, young footman Albert places a bet on a "Mr. X", someone totally out of the blue.

Lady Alyce has a secret romantic interest in an American whom family has not met. She leaves the castle one day to venture into London and encounters American entertainer Jerry Halliday, who is accompanied by press agent George and his secretary Gracie.

Jerry is incorrectly led to believe that he is the American whom Lady Alyce loves. He visits the castle, encouraged by Albert but discouraged by Keggs, a scheming butler whose money is on another suitor.

Jerry fails to recognize Lady Alyce's father, the lord of the manor. He is slapped in the face in a Tunnel of Love, misunderstanding Lady Alyce's intentions. In the end, the pair find romance.

== Cast ==
- Fred Astaire as Jerry Halliday
- George Burns as George Burns
- Gracie Allen as Gracie Allen
- Joan Fontaine as Lady Alyce
- Reginald Gardiner as Keggs
- Ray Noble as Reggie
- Constance Collier as Lady Caroline
- Montagu Love as Lord Marshmorton
- Harry Watson as Albert
- Jan Duggan as Miss Ruggles

== Production ==
A Damsel in Distress was the first of Fred Astaire's RKO films to not feature Ginger Rogers, and 19-year-old Joan Fontaine was cast in the female leading role. It soon emerged that Fontaine could not dance, but director George Stevens persuaded Astaire to not replace her with Ruby Keeler. The film was Astaire's first to fail to return a profit, costing $1,035,000 to produce and losing $65,000.

Charley Chase was originally supposed to appear in the film as Jerry’s valet. However, he withdrew because of his poor health and his part was rewritten for Burns and Allen.

The sequence in the funhouse garnered choreographer Hermes Pan the 1937 Academy Award for Best Dance Direction. Carroll Clark was nominated for the Academy Award for Best Art Direction.

Orchestrator Robert Russell Bennett and conductor Victor Baravalle had previously worked together on the original stage production of Show Boat, as well as the 1936 film version.

The film was nominated for the American Film Institute's 2006 list AFI's Greatest Movie Musicals.

== Music ==
The choreography explores dancing around, past and through obstacles, and in confined spaces.

- "I Can't Be Bothered Now": Sung by Astaire while executing a tap solo with cane in the middle of a London street and escaping on a bus.
- "Put Me to the Test": Astaire, Burns, and Allen perform a comic tap dance with whisk brooms, a routine inspired by vaudeville duo Evans and Evans and introduced to Astaire by Burns, who quipped: "Gracie and I ended up teaching Astaire how to dance."
- "Stiff Upper Lip": Sung by Gracie Allen, followed by the funhouse scene.
- "Things Are Looking Up": Astaire sings one of Gershwin's "most beautiful, yet underappreciated ballads" followed by a romantic dance through the woods with Fontaine.
- "A Foggy Day (in London Town)": Astaire introduces what has become a standard in the Great American Songbook, sung while alternately walking and dancing solo through a wooded landscape. It is featured heavily in the film The Notorious Landlady (1962), in which Astaire plays a supporting role.
- "Nice Work If You Can Get It": The film's second Gershwin standard is introduced by Astaire and chorus, followed by an Astaire tap solo, executed while confined by and playing a set of drums. It was shot in one continuous take.
- Two faux madrigals written by the Gershwins: "Sing of Spring" and "The Jolly Tar and the Milkmaid". These are performed by a group of madrigal singers, with Astaire joining the latter song.
- Lyonel's Prayer Mag der Himmel euch vergeben (in Italian Ah! Che a voi perdoni iddio : Ah! May Heaven to You Grant Pardon) from the opera Martha, music by Friedrich von Flotow, libretto by Friedrich Wilhelm Riese, sung by (Reginald Gardiner) Keggs (voiced by Mario Berini).

== Reception ==
In a contemporary review for The New York Times, critic Frank S. Nugent wrote: "For a chap who has just been deprived of Ginger Rogers as a co-star, Fred Astaire is bearing up astonishingly well ... He probably misses his dancing partner a little—he'd have to say so any way—but there's no evidence that he has been brooding over the loss. In fact, there were times when we suspected him of enjoying this gallivanting around with a new leading lady. Not that we blame him, either; Joan Fontaine is mighty attractive gallivantee, even if she can't dance."
