= Ira Gershwin =

American lyricist (1896–1983)

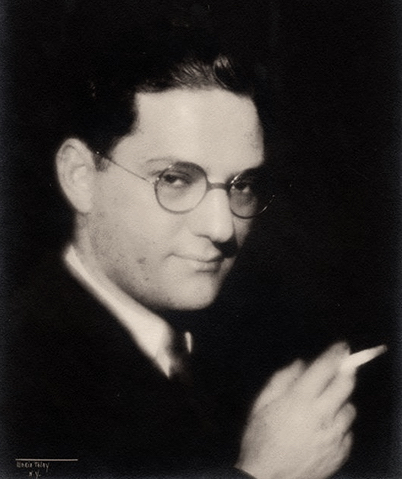
- Gershwin in 1925
- Born: Israel Gershovitz; December 6, 1896; New York City, U.S
- Died: August 17, 1983 (aged 86); Beverly Hills, California, U.S
- Other names: Israel Gershvin; Arthur Francis
- Education: City College of New York
- Occupation: Lyricist
- Years active: 1910s–1950s
- Known for: Collaborations with George Gershwin; Porgy and Bess
- Notable work: I Got Rhythm, Embraceable You, Lyrics on Several Occasions
- Spouse: Leonore Strunsky (m. 1926)
- Website: Official website

Ira Gershwin (born Israel Gershovitz; December 6, 1896 – August 17, 1983) was an American lyricist who collaborated with his younger brother, composer George Gershwin, to create some of the most memorable English-language songs of the 20th century. With George, he wrote more than a dozen Broadway shows, featuring songs such as "I Got Rhythm", "Embraceable You", "The Man I Love", and "Someone to Watch Over Me". He was also responsible, along with DuBose Heyward, for the libretto to George's opera Porgy and Bess.

The success the Gershwin brothers had with their collaborative works has often overshadowed the creative role that Ira played. His mastery of songwriting continued after George's early death in 1937. Ira wrote additional hit songs with composers Kurt Weill, Jerome Kern and Harold Arlen. His critically acclaimed 1959 book Lyrics on Several Occasions, an amalgam of autobiography and annotated anthology, is widely considered an important source for studying the art of the lyricist in the golden age of American popular song.

== Early life ==
Gershwin was born at 60 Eldridge Street in Chinatown, Manhattan, the oldest of four children of Morris (Moishe) and Rose Gershovitz (née Roza Bruskina), who were Russian Jews from Saint Petersburg and had immigrated to the United States in 1891. Ira's siblings were George (Jacob, b. 1898), Arthur (b. 1900), and Frances (b. 1906). Morris changed the family name to "Gershwine" (or alternatively "Gershvin") well before their children rose to fame; it was not spelled "Gershwin" until later.

Shy in his youth, Ira spent much of his time at home reading, but from grammar school through college, he played a prominent part in several school newspapers and magazines. He graduated in 1914 from Townsend Harris High School, a public school for intellectually gifted students, where he met Yip Harburg, with whom he enjoyed a lifelong friendship and a love of Gilbert and Sullivan. He attended the City College of New York but dropped out.

The childhood home of Ira and George Gershwin was in the center of the Yiddish Theatre District in the East Village, on the second floor at 91 Second Avenue, between East 5th and 6th streets. They frequented the local Yiddish theatres.

While George began composing and "plugging" in Tin Pan Alley from the age of 18, Ira worked as a cashier in his father's Victorian-style Turkish baths. He was a joyous listener to the sounds of the modern world. "He had a sharp eye and ear for the minutiae of living." He noted in a diary: "Heard in a day: An elevator's purr, telephone's ring, telephone's buzz, a baby's moans, a shout of delight, a screech from a 'flat wheel', hoarse honks, a hoarse voice, a tinkle, a match scratch on sandpaper, a deep resounding boom of dynamiting in the impending subway, iron hooks on the gutter."

== Career beginnings ==
Ira's first published lyric was a parody, published in the New York Sun in 1917. He began writing lyrics for a few of his brother George's songs, and for other composers as well. To maintain his independence from his successful brother, Ira wrote under the pseudonym Arthur Francis, after their younger siblings' given names. 'Arthur' and George's "The Real American Folk Song (is a Rag)" was their first song used in a show, Ladies First (1918), though it was cut early in the show's New York run. Ira wrote his first published and recorded song, "Waiting for the Sun to Come Out", with George for The Sweetheart Shop in 1920; it made them a substantial amount of money. In 1921 they wrote five songs together for A Dangerous Maid, but it closed out of town.

Later that year, Ira created his first successful musical, Two Little Girls in Blue, not with his brother but with composers Paul Lannin and (in his Broadway debut) Vincent Youmans. Having established himself, he wrote the lyrics for Be Yourself (1924) under his own name.

== Success with George ==
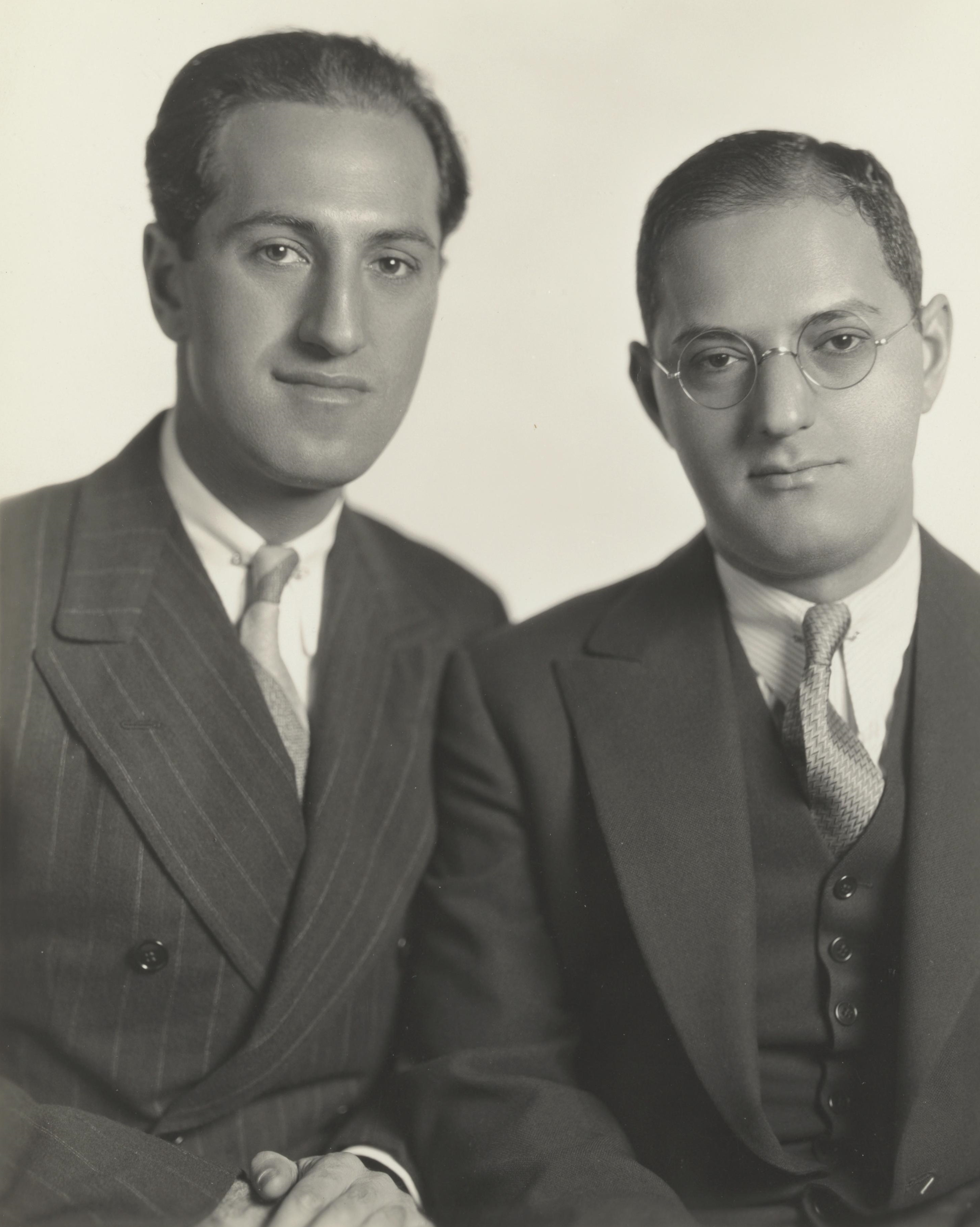
George and Ira Gershwin in 1930

Ira and George's combined talents soon became one of the most influential forces in the history of American musical theatre. In 1924 they wrote their first Broadway hit, Lady, Be Good. "When the Gershwins teamed up to write songs for Lady, Be Good, the American musical found its native idiom." They wrote songs for thirteen musicals together. The most celebrated was Girl Crazy (1930): it was the stage debut of both Ginger Rogers and Ethel Merman; several of its songs became hits, including "Embraceable You"; and it was adapted into film three times and rewritten into the 1992 musical Crazy for You. Ira also supplemented DuBose Heyward's libretto for the opera Porgy and Bess, composed by George, with lyrics for several songs, notably "It Ain't Necessarily So".

During their Broadway years together, the brothers also wrote songs for one film, Delicious, and Ira contributed songs to several revues.

When Porgy and Bess was a commercial disappointment, the Gershwins moved to Hollywood, where they wrote the songs for three films in quick succession: Shall We Dance and A Damsel in Distress, both released in 1937, and The Goldwyn Follies, released in 1938. Though the films themselves met with mixed commercial and critical reception, an unprecedented number of the Gershwins' songs for them were hits, including "They All Laughed", "Let's Call the Whole Thing Off" and "They Can't Take That Away from Me" from Shall We Dance, "Nice Work If You Can Get It" and "A Foggy Day" from A Damsel in Distress, and "Love Is Here to Stay" from The Goldwyn Follies.

The Gershwins' partnership ended when George unexpectedly died of a brain tumor in 1937. Following his brother's death, Ira waited nearly three years before writing again.

== Later career ==
After this temporary retirement, Ira resumed writing songs for Broadway shows and films, working with a series of accomplished composers. In 1941 he worked with Kurt Weill on the unusual but successful musical Lady in the Dark. In 1943 he wrote songs with Aaron Copland for the war film The North Star. In 1944, among Ira and Jerome Kern's songs for Cover Girl, they wrote "Long Ago (and Far Away)", which yielded Ira more royalties than any other song he ever wrote. In 1945 he and Kurt Weill collaborated again, on the film Where Do We Go from Here? and the operetta The Firebrand of Florence, neither of them smashes. The failure of Park Avenue in 1946 (a "smart" show about divorce, co-written with composer Arthur Schwartz) was his farewell to Broadway. As he wrote at the time, "Am reading a couple of stories for possible musicalization (if there is such a word) but I hope I don't like them as I think I deserve a long rest."

Ira wrote songs for the film The Barkleys of Broadway with Harry Warren and for Give a Girl a Break with Burton Lane. In 1947, he took eleven compositions George had written but never used and wrote lyrics for them for the Betty Grable film The Shocking Miss Pilgrim. He worked with Harold Arlen on two films released in 1954: the Judy Garland film A Star Is Born, considered by most critics to have been his last major work, and The Country Girl. Ira later wrote lyrics to more of his brother's unpublished compositions for Billy Wilder's 1964 movie Kiss Me, Stupid.

American singer, pianist and musical historian Michael Feinstein worked for Gershwin in the lyricist's latter years, helping him with his archive. Several lost musical treasures were unearthed during this period, and Feinstein performed some of the material. Feinstein's book The Gershwins and Me: A Personal History in Twelve Songs about working for Ira, and George and Ira's music, was published in 2012.

== Personal life ==
Gershwin married Leonore (née Strunsky) in 1926.

According to a 1999 story in Vanity Fair, Ira Gershwin's love for loud music was as great as his wife's loathing of it. When Debby Boone—daughter-in-law of his neighbor Rosemary Clooney—returned from Japan with one of the first Sony Walkmans (utilizing cassette tape), Clooney gave it to Michael Feinstein to give to Ira, "so he could crank it in his ears, you know. And he said, 'This is absolutely wonderful!' And he called his broker and bought Sony stock!"

Ira died of heart disease in Beverly Hills, California, on August 17, 1983, at the age of 86. Leonore died on August 20, 1991 at the age of 90.

== Awards and honors ==
Along with George S. Kaufman and Morrie Ryskind, Ira Gershwin was a recipient of the 1932 Pulitzer Prize for Drama for Of Thee I Sing.

Three of his songs ("They Can't Take That Away from Me" (1937), "Long Ago (and Far Away)" (1944) and "The Man That Got Away" (1954)) were nominated for an Academy Award for Best Original Song, though none won.

Ira Gershwin was inducted into the Songwriters Hall of Fame in 1971.

== Legacy ==
In 1987, Ira's widow, Leonore, established the Ira Gershwin Literacy Center at University Settlement, a century-old institution at 185 Eldridge Street on the Lower East Side, New York City. The center is designed to give English-language programs to primarily Hispanic and Chinese Americans. Ira and his younger brother George spent many after-school hours at the Settlement.

In 1988 UCLA established The George and Ira Gershwin Lifetime Musical Achievement Award in recognition of the brothers' contribution to music, and for their gift to UCLA of the fight song "Strike Up the Band for UCLA".

In 2007, the United States Library of Congress named its Prize for Popular Song after Ira and his brother George. Recognizing the profound and positive effect of American popular music on the world's culture, the prize will be given annually to a composer or performer whose lifetime contributions exemplify the standard of excellence associated with the Gershwins.

== Notable songs ==
Except where mentioned, the following songs were composed by George Gershwin.

- "Oh, Lady Be Good!", "Fascinating Rhythm" and "The Man I Love", from Lady, Be Good (1924)
- "Someone to Watch Over Me", from Oh, Kay! (1926)
- "How Long Has This Been Going On?" and "'S Wonderful", from Funny Face (1927)
- "Strike Up the Band", from the musical of the same name (1927)
- "I've Got a Crush on You", from Treasure Girl (1928)
- "But Not for Me", "Embraceable You" and "I Got Rhythm", from Girl Crazy (1930)
- "I Can't Get Started", music by Vernon Duke, from Ziegfeld Follies of 1936
- "Let's Call the Whole Thing Off", "They All Laughed" and "They Can't Take That Away from Me", from Shall We Dance (1937)
- "Nice Work If You Can Get It" and "A Foggy Day", from A Damsel in Distress (1937)
- "Love Is Here to Stay", from The Goldwyn Follies (1938)
- "My Ship", music by Kurt Weill, from Lady in the Dark (1941)
- "Long Ago (and Far Away)", music by Jerome Kern, from Cover Girl (1944)
- "The Man That Got Away", music by Harold Arlen, from A Star Is Born (1954)

See also Songs with lyrics by Ira Gershwin.
