= List of compositions by George Gershwin =

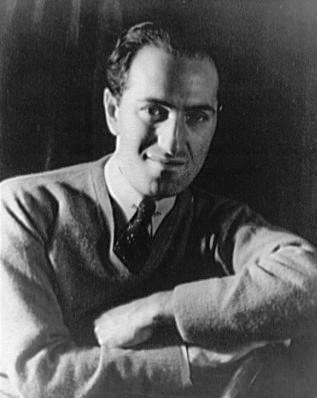
George Gershwin in 1937

This is a list of compositions by George Gershwin, a Broadway songwriter and a classical composer. His works are grouped thematically in this list, and in chronological order according to the dates of compositions in the same group.

== Classical works ==
Note: All orchestral/operatic pieces are orchestrated by Gershwin unless otherwise specified.

- Lullaby (1919), a meditative piece for string quartet. Originally, a class assignment from his music theory teacher.
- Blue Monday (1922), a one-act opera featured in George White's Scandals of 1922 at the Globe Theatre, Paul Whiteman conducting, orchestrated by Will Vodery.
  - Reorchestrated by Ferde Grofé and retitled 135th Street in 1925 for a performance at Carnegie Hall.
  - A suite from Blue Monday was later arranged for piano by pianist and Gershwin scholar Alicia Zizzo and has been recorded.
- Rhapsody in Blue (1924), Gershwin's most famous classical work, a symphonic jazz composition for Paul Whiteman's jazz band & piano, premiered at Aeolian Hall, New York City, better known in the form orchestrated for full symphonic orchestra. Both versions were orchestrated by Ferde Grofé. Featured in numerous films and commercials.
- Short Story (1925), for violin and piano, an arrangement of two other short pieces originally intended to be included with the Three Preludes. Premiered by Samuel Dushkin at The University Club of New York in New York City.
- Concerto in F (1925), three movements, for piano and orchestra, premiered in Carnegie Hall by the New York Symphony Orchestra, Walter Damrosch conducting.
  1. Allegro
  2. Adagio – Andante con moto – Adagio
  3. Allegro agitato
- Overture to Strike Up the Band (1927/revised 1930), the longest and most complex of the overtures for Gershwin's broadway shows, several sections are polytonal/atonal
- March from Strike Up the Band (1927) is a very popular musical interlude from the 1927 stage musical of the same title.
- An American in Paris (1928), a symphonic tone poem with elements of jazz and realistic sound effects, premiered in Carnegie Hall by the New York Philharmonic, Walter Damrosch conducting.
- Dream Sequence (1931), a five-minute interlude for orchestra and chorus, meant to portray a mind reeling into the dream state. Also known as The Melting Pot. Different music than the Rhapsody in Rivets (see Second Rhapsody below). Other musical sequences went unused that Gershwin created for Delicious, as Fox Film Corporation declined to use the rest of his score.
- Second Rhapsody (1931), for piano and orchestra, part of which was used in Delicious in the Rhapsody in Rivets sequence (it has been a common misconception that the orchestral work was a subsequent expansion of the film sequence). Working title was Rhapsody in Rivets. Premiered at the Boston Symphony Hall by the Boston Symphony Orchestra, Serge Koussevitzky conducting.
- Overture to Of Thee I Sing (1931), for orchestra. The shortest Broadway overture written by Gershwin. It is also the least episodic of his overtures. Only two songs are quoted in the overture, the rest are only referenced in fragments and repeating musical cells. Also features Gershwin's only known violin cadenza.
- Cuban Overture (1932), originally titled Rumba, a tone poem featuring elements of native Cuban dance and folk music; score specifies usage of native Cuban instruments, premiered at the Lewisohn Stadium of the City University of New York, Gershwin conducting.
- Variations on "I Got Rhythm" (1934), a set of interesting variations on his famous song, for piano and orchestra. Premiered at the Boston Symphony Hall by the Leo Reisman Orchestra, conducted by Charles Previn.
  - Includes a waltz, an atonal fugue, and experimentation with Asian and jazz influences
- Porgy and Bess, opera in three acts, sometimes called a "folk opera" (1935) (libretto and lyrics by DuBose Heyward and Ira Gershwin from the play by DuBose and Dorothy Heyward about Gullah Geechee life, itself based on DuBose's 1925 novel). Now considered a definitive work of the American theater. Premiered at Boston's Colonial Theater, Alexander Smallens conducting.
  - Includes "Summertime," "My Man's Gone Now," "I Got Plenty o' Nuttin'", "Bess, You Is My Woman Now," "It Ain't Necessarily So," and "I Loves You Porgy"
  - Revived in 1942, 1943, 1953, 1976 (by Houston Grand Opera; winner of the Tony Award for Most Innovative Revival of a Musical), 1983, and 2012 (adapted as musical)
  - Porgy and Bess has also been frequently heard in the concert hall; the suite fashioned by Robert Russell Bennett, Porgy and Bess: A Symphonic Picture is relatively popular.
- Catfish Row (1936), a 5-movement suite based on material from Porgy and Bess, much of it cut before its Broadway premiere.
  1. Catfish Row
  2. Porgy Sings
  3. Fugue
  4. Hurricane
  5. Good Morning, Brother
- Score to Shall We Dance (1937 film) (1937). This was the first full movie score composed and orchestrated by Gershwin, excluding the score for Delicious which was almost completely rejected by Fox Studios. This massive score includes a final extended 8-minute orchestral passage based on the title song with an intriguing coda hinting at Gershwin forging a new musical path.
  - Hoctor's Ballet. This piece features glissandos, rapid shifts in key, and the most extensive parts Gershwin wrote for the harp; written by Gershwin specifically for the ballerina Harriet Hoctor.
    - Premiere live concert performance of Hoctor's Ballet occurred on July 28, 2007 at the Severance Hall Pavilion in Cleveland, Ohio; Loras John Schissel conducting the Blossom Festival Orchestra.
  - Walking the Dog, a humorous piece for chamber orchestra featuring the clarinet and the piano. Besides Hoctor's Ballet, this is the only published musical sequence from the movie Shall We Dance. Originally entitled "Promenade."
- Other purely orchestral pieces from the score that remain unpublished include:
    - Overture to Shall We Dance, a propulsive, frenetic movement in Gershwin's urban music mode;
    - Waltz of the Red Balloons, a waltz with unusual tonalities;
    - Rehearsal Fragments;
    - Rumba Sequence, music completely different from the Cuban Overture;
    - (I've Got) Beginner's Luck (dance), written to accompany a scene of Astaire's rehearsing to a "record" which eventually skips;
    - They Can't Take That Away from Me: this sequence is in the form of a foxtrot, one of Gershwin's favorites from the score;
    - Slap that Bass, a sparse musical sequence focusing on the rhythm sections of the orchestra;
    - They All Laughed;
    - Dance of the Waves, a barcarole;
    - Graceful and Elegant, a pas de deux;
    - French Ballet Class (for two pianos), a galop: only about 20 seconds of this was used for the film;
    - Shall We Dance/Finale & Coda, technically a continuation of the Hoctor's Ballet scene, but often noted as a separate musical number;
    - Unknown Spanish Sequence: Gershwin composed a movement for the finale that went unused after he played it for the director; only exists in short score.
  - The score is over an hour in length, the longest of all of Gershwin's orchestral works. Other musical numbers not listed here have vocals, but these can be omitted for live performance as vocal lines are doubled on instruments. All other vocal/orchestral arrangements in the rest of the numbers were by Gershwin, with Robert Russell Bennett and Nat Shilkret acting under Gershwin's direction as assistants in the orchestration process of a few scenes in order to meet deadlines.
- Most of the musicals Gershwin wrote are also known for their instrumental music, especially the overtures to many of his later shows.

== Overtures ==
- 1922 - Blue Monday*
- 1924 - Primrose*
- 1924 - Lady, Be Good!*
- 1925 - Tip-Toes*
- 1926 - Oh, Kay!**
- 1927/ rev. 1930 - Strike Up The Band***
- 1927 - Funny Face**
- 1930 - Girl Crazy**
- 1931 - Of Thee I Sing**
- 1933 - Pardon My English**
- 1933 - Let 'Em Eat Cake**

* orchestrated for pit orchestra
** augmented instrumentation for symphony orchestra by Don Rose: 2 flutes, piccolo, 2 oboes, English horn, 2 clarinets, bass clarinet, 2 bassoons, contrabassoon, alto saxophone, 4 horns, 3 trumpets, 2 trombones, bass trombone, tuba, timpani, 4 percussion, harp, piano, strings
*** full orchestration with celesta

== Solo works for piano ==
- Tango, (1915) for solo piano. Written when he was 15.
- Rialto Ripples, (1917) a short ragtime piece for piano with Will Donaldson
- Limehouse Nights (unknown date, early) a short ragtime piece for piano.
- Three-Quarter Blues, (1923) also known as the Irish Waltz.
- Prelude (unnumbered), (1923) – Rubato – Gershwin originally intended this prelude to be included with the Three Preludes. Unpublished.
- Novelette in Fourths (1919), a prelude, but more specifically a "cake-walk" (not a rag) in E-flat, possibly conceived as one of the 24 intended preludes in the composer's "melting pot" plan; some of the music was rearranged and used as part of Short Story, a piece written for piano and solo violin with Samuel Dushkin
- Fascinating Rhythm (1924) Lyrics by Ira Gershwin
- Romantic, (1925) Short piano fragment. Also known as Melody #55. Unpublished.
- Melody No. 17 (1925–1926) Another piece originally intended to be included with the Piano Preludes.
- Three Preludes, (1926) first performed by Gershwin at the Roosevelt Hotel in New York City:
  1. Allegro ben ritmato e deciso
  2. Andante con moto
  3. Agitato (as marked in the manuscript)
- Swiss Miss, (1926) arrangement of a song from Lady, Be Good
- Machinery Gone Mad, (1927) unpublished
- Blue Monday, (1927) a piano suite based on Gershwin's one-act opera of the same name
- Merry Andrew, (1928) arrangement of a dance piece from Rosalie
- Three-Note Waltz, (1931) Also known as Melody #36. Unpublished.
- Piano Transcriptions of Eight Songs (1932)
- George Gershwin’s Song-Book (1932), complex arrangements of 18 Gershwin songs
  - the 1932 hardbound editions contained original artwork by Constantin Alajalov for the 18 songs
  - a 19th song was enclosed with the 500 signed/numbered copies of the 1932 first edition: Mischa, Yascha, Toscha, Sascha
- For Lily Pons, (1934) unpublished piece originally intended as accompaniment to an unwritten operatic solo. (Melody #79)
- French Ballet Class (for two pianos) (1937), for two pianos, unpublished music from the film score for Shall We Dance
- Impromptu in Two Keys, published posthumously in (1973), for piano
- Two Waltzes in C, published posthumously in (1975), for piano
  - Originally a two-piano interlude in Pardon My English on Broadway.
- Sleepless Night, unpublished
- Sutton Place, unpublished (Melody #59)

== Musical theater credits ==
Note: All works are musicals produced on Broadway unless specified otherwise.

- 1919 – La La Lucille (lyrics by Arthur Jackson and B. G. DeSylva, additional by Irving Caesar) (Note: "The Love of a Wife," while published in conjunction with La La Lucille, was used only in tryouts. See Pollack 2006, pp. 233–234.)
- 1919 – Morris Gest's Midnight Whirl (lyrics by Buddy DeSylva, John Henry Mears)
- 1920 – George White's Scandals of 1920 (lyrics by Arthur Jackson)
- 1921 – A Dangerous Maid (lyrics by Ira Gershwin as "Arthur Francis"). Premiered in Atlantic City.
  - Includes "Boy Wanted"
- 1921 – The Broadway Whirl (other music by Harry Tierney; lyrics by Buddy DeSylva, Joseph McCarthy, Richard Carle and John Henry Mears), which reused songs from Morris Gest's Midnight Whirl
- 1921 – George White's Scandals of 1921 (lyrics by Arthur Jackson)
  - Includes "South Sea Isles" and "Drifting Along with the Tide"
- 1922 – George White's Scandals of 1922 (lyrics primarily by E. Ray Goetz and B. G. DeSylva)
  - Includes "Stairway to Paradise" (lyrics by DeSylva and Ira Gershwin as "Arthur Francis")
  - The premiere performance featured the one-act opera Blue Monday with libretto and lyrics by B. G. DeSylva, set in Harlem in a jazz idiom. However, after only one performance, the opera was withdrawn from the show. Gershwin also wrote seven other songs for the show.
- 1922 – Our Nell (co-composed with William Daly Jr., lyrics co-written by Brian Hooker and A. E. Thomas)
  - Includes "Innocent Ingenue Baby" and "Walking Home with Angeline"
- 1923 – The Rainbow (lyrics primarily by Clifford Grey). Premiered in London.
  - Grey modified Brian Hooker's lyrics to "Innocent Ingenue Baby" (see under Our Nell above) as "Innocent Lonesome Blue Baby" and repurposed the music of "Come to the Moon" (see under Demi-Tasse below) as "All Over Town."
- 1923 – George White's Scandals of 1923 (lyrics by E. Ray Goetz, B. G. DeSylva, and Ballard MacDonald)
- 1924 – Sweet Little Devil (lyrics by B. G. DeSylva)
- 1924 – George White's Scandals of 1924 (lyrics primarily by B. G. DeSylva)
  - Includes "Somebody Loves Me" (lyrics by Ballard MacDonald and DeSylva)
- 1924 – Primrose (lyrics by Desmond Carter and Ira Gershwin). Premiered in London.
  - Includes a revised version of "Boy Wanted" and "Naughty Baby"
- 1924 – Lady, Be Good! (lyrics by Ira Gershwin)
  - Includes "Oh, Lady Be Good!," "Fascinating Rhythm," and "'The Half of It, Dearie' Blues"; "The Man I Love" used in tryouts
- 1925 – Tell Me More (lyrics by Ira Gershwin and B. G. DeSylva)
  - Includes "Kickin' the Clouds Away"
- 1925 – Tip-Toes (lyrics by Ira Gershwin)
  - Includes "Looking for a Boy," "Sweet and Low-Down," and "That Certain Feeling"
- 1925 – Song of the Flame (operetta, lyrics by Otto Harbach and Oscar Hammerstein II, and musical collaboration by Herbert Stothart)
- 1926 – Oh, Kay! (lyrics by Ira Gershwin and Howard Dietz
  - Includes "Clap Yo' Hands," "Do, Do, Do," and "Someone to Watch Over Me"
  - Revived in 1928 and 1990 (the latter with an all-Black cast)
- 1927 – Strike Up the Band (lyrics by Ira Gershwin). Premiered in Philadelphia.
  - Includes "Strike Up the Band", "Soon," and "The Man I Love"
  - Revised and produced on Broadway in 1930 ("The Man I Love" dropped; "I've Got a Crush on You" from Treasure Girl added).
- 1927 – Funny Face (lyrics by Ira Gershwin)
  - Includes "'S Wonderful," "Funny Face," "He Loves and She Loves," "Let's Kiss and Make Up," and "My One and Only"; "How Long Has This Been Going On" used in tryouts (replaced by "He Loves and She Loves")
- 1928 – Rosalie (lyrics by Ira Gershwin and P. G. Wodehouse, co-composed with Sigmund Romberg)
  - Includes "How Long Has This Been Going On"
- 1928 – Treasure Girl (lyrics by Ira Gershwin)
  - Includes "I've Got a Crush on You," "Oh, So Nice!," and "What Causes That?"
- 1929 – Show Girl (lyrics by Ira Gershwin and Gus Kahn)
  - Includes "Liza (All the Clouds'll Roll Away)"
- 1930 – Girl Crazy (lyrics by Ira Gershwin)
  - Includes "Bidin' My Time," "Boy! What Love Has Done to Me!," "But Not For Me," "Embraceable You," "I Got Rhythm," "Sam and Delilah," and "Treat Me Rough"
  - See also 1932 film adaptation below.
- 1931 – Of Thee I Sing (lyrics by Ira Gershwin)
  - Includes "Love Is Sweeping the Country," "Of Thee I Sing," and "Who Cares?"
  - Awarded the Pulitzer Prize for Drama for 1932 and was the first musical to win that award, although only Ira Gershwin and the bookwriters, George S. Kaufman and Morrie Ryskind, were awarded the Prize and not George Gershwin
  - Revived in 1933 and 1952
- 1933 – Pardon My English (lyrics by Ira Gershwin)
  - Includes "Isn't It a Pity?," "Lorelei," and "My Cousin in Milwaukee"
- 1933 – Let 'Em Eat Cake (lyrics by Ira Gershwin), sequel to Of Thee I Sing
- 1935 – For Porgy and Bess, see under "Classical."

=== Musicals by other composers featuring original Gershwin songs ===
- 1916 – The Passing Show of 1916 – "Making of a Girl" (co-composed with Sigmund Romberg, lyrics by Harold Atteridge); "My Runaway Girl" (lyrics by Murray Roth) possibly used as well
- 1918 – Hitchy-Koo of 1918 – "You-oo Just You" (lyrics by Irving Caesar)
- 1918 – Ladies First – "The Real American Folk Song (is a Rag)" (lyrics by Ira Gershwin as "Arthur Francis"); in try-outs, "Some Wonderful Sort of Someone" (lyrics by Schuyler Greene) and "Something about Love" (lyrics by Lou Paley)
- 1918 – Half-Past Eight – "There's Magic in the Air" (lyrics by Ira Gershwin); "The Ten Commandments of Love", "Cupid" and "Hong Kong" (lyrics by Edward B. Perkins)
- 1919 – Good Morning, Judge – "I Was So Young (You Were So Beautiful)" (lyrics by Irving Caesar and Alfred Bryan); "There’s More to the Kiss than the X-X-X" (lyrics by Irving Caesar)
- 1919 – The Lady in Red – "Some Wonderful Sort of Someone" and "Something about Love" (see above under Ladies First)
- 1919 – Demi-Tasse (part of the revue that opened the Capitol Theatre) – "Come to the Moon" (lyrics by Lou Paley and Ned Wayburn); "Swanee" (lyrics by Irving Caesar)
- 1919–1921 – Sinbad – Throughout the long run of this show, Al Jolson at various points sung "Swanee" (see above under Demi-Tasse) and "Swanee Rose" (alternate title "Dixie Rose," lyrics by Irving Caesar and Buddy DeSylva)
- 1920 – Dere Mabel – "We’re Pals" (lyrics by Irving Caesar), first performed in Baltimore; "Back Home" (lyrics by Ira Gershwin) and "I Don't Know Why (When I Dance with You)" (lyrics by Irving Caesar)
- 1920 – Ed Wynn's Carnival – "Oo, How I Love You To Be Loved by You" (lyrics by Lou Paley; song dropped from La La Lucille early in its Broadway run)
- 1920 – The Sweetheart Shop – "Waiting for the Sun to Come Out" (lyrics by Ira Gershwin as "Arthur Francis")
- 1920 – Broadway Brevities of 1920 – "Lu Lu" and "Snow Flakes" (lyrics by Arthur Jackson); "Spanish Love" (lyrics by Irving Caesar)
- 1920 – Piccadilly to Broadway (songs unpublished)
- 1921 – Blue Eyes (songs unpublished)
- 1921 – Selwyn's Snapshots of 1921 – "On the Brim of Her Old-Fashioned Bonnet", "The Baby Blues," and "Futuristic Melody" (lyrics by E. Ray Goetz, songs unpublished)
- 1921 – The Perfect Fool – "My Log-Cabin Home" (lyrics by Irving Caesar and Buddy De Sylva); "No One Else but that Girl of Mine" (lyrics by Irving Caesar)
- 1922 – The French Doll – "Do It Again" (lyrics by Buddy De Sylva)
- 1922 – For Goodness Sake – "Someone" and "Tra-la-la" (lyrics by Ira Gershwin as "Arthur Francis")
- 1922 – Spice of 1922 – "The Yankee Doodle Blues" (lyrics by Irving Caesar and Buddy De Sylva)
- 1923 – The Dancing Girl – "That American Boy of Mine" (lyrics by Irving Caesar)
- 1923 – Little Miss Bluebeard – "I Won’t Say I Will, But I Won’t Say I Won’t" (lyrics by Ira Gershwin as "Arthur Francis" and Buddy De Sylva)
- 1923 – Nifties of 1923 – "At Half-Past Seven" (lyrics by Buddy De Sylva); "Nashville Nightingale" (lyrics by Irving Caesar)
- 1926 – Americana – "That Lost Barber Shop Chord" (lyrics by Ira Gershwin)
- 1930 – Nine-Fifteen Revue – "Toddlin' Along" (lyrics by Ira Gershwin, previously used in tryouts for Funny Face as "The World Is Mine")
- 1936 – Swing Is King — "King of Swing" (lyrics by Al Stillman)
- 1936 – The Show Is On – "By Strauss" (lyrics by Ira Gershwin). Revived in 1937.

=== Musicals interpolating Gershwin songs posthumously ===
- 1983 – My One and Only – an adaptation of the music from Funny Face
- 1992 – Crazy for You – musical adapting George and Ira Gershwin Tin Pan Alley and Broadway songs, awarded the Tony Award for Best Musical
- 1999 – The Gershwins' Fascinating Rhythm – revue with songs by George and Ira Gershwin
- 2001 – George Gershwin Alone – one-man play by Hershey Felder, who portrayed Gershwin, incorporating "Swanee" from Sinbad (lyrics by Irving Caesar), "Embraceable You" from Girl Crazy (lyrics by Ira Gershwin), "Someone to Watch Over Me" from Oh, Kay! (lyrics by Ira Gershwin), "Bess, You is My Woman Now" from Porgy and Bess (lyrics by DuBose Heyward and Ira Gershwin), An American in Paris and Rhapsody in Blue.
- 2002 – Back from Broadway – one-time concert featuring songs by George Gershwin
- 2010 – Brian Wilson Reimagines Gershwin – two incomplete pieces by Gershwin finished by Brian Wilson and 12 other reimagined Gershwin classics
- 2012 – Nice Work If You Can Get It
- 2015 – A Damsel in Distress

== Musical films ==
George wrote the music for all of the following films, and Ira wrote the lyrics (in some cases after George's death).

- 1923 – The Sunshine Trail (title song, with lyrics by Ira Gershwin as "Arthur Francis," of silent film with accompaniment music)
- 1931 – Delicious
  - Includes "Blah Blah Blah" and "Somebody from Somewhere"
- 1937 – Shall We Dance
  - Includes Hoctor's Ballet, "(I've Got) Beginner's Luck," "Let's Call the Whole Thing Off," "Slap That Bass," "They All Laughed," "They Can't Take That Away from Me," and "Walking the Dog."
- 1937 – A Damsel in Distress
  - Includes "A Foggy Day," "I Can't Be Bothered Now," "Nice Work If You Can Get It," "Stiff Upper Lip," and "Things Are Looking Up."
- 1938 – The Goldwyn Follies (Gershwin died during filming; Vernon Duke completed and adapted Gershwin's songs, and composed additional ones)
  - Includes "I Was Doing All Right," "Love Is Here to Stay," and "Love Walked In." "Just Another Rhumba" was considered for this film and possibly for A Damsel in Distress.
- 1947 – The Shocking Miss Pilgrim (Kay Swift adapted a number of unpublished Gershwin melodies)
  - Includes "For You, for Me, for Evermore"
- 1964 – Kiss Me, Stupid (adaptations of unpublished Gershwin songs)

=== Films interpolating Gershwin songs ===
Gershwin's songs have been reused in too many films to list. The films listed here have a significant connection to Gershwin or his works.

- 1932 – Girl Crazy
  - The song "You've Got What Gets Me" was newly written for this film.
- 1941 – Lady Be Good
- 1945 – Rhapsody in Blue (biopic)
- 1943 – Girl Crazy
- 1951 – An American in Paris
  - The lyrics for "Tra-la-la" were rewritten for this film.
- 1957 – Funny Face
- 1959 – Porgy and Bess
- 1965 – When the Boys Meet the Girls (adaptation of Girl Crazy)

== Miscellaneous songs ==
- 1916 – "When You Want ’Em, You Can’t Get ’Em (When You’ve Got ’Em, You Don’t Want ’Em)" (lyrics by Murray Roth), George Gershwin's first publication
- ca. 1916 – "When the Armies Disband" (lyrics by Irving Caesar and Alfred Bryan), thought lost
- 1917 – "Beautiful Bird" (lyrics by Ira Gershwin and Lou Paley)
- 1918 – "Gush-Gush-Gushing" (lyrics by Ira Gershwin)
- 1918 – "Good Little Tune" (lyrics by Irving Caesar)
- ca. 1919 – "When There's a Chance To Dance" (lyrics by Ira Gershwin)
- 1919 – "O Land of Mine, America" (lyrics by Michael E. Rourke). A national anthem submission for a competition in the New York American, in which the song was published anonymously on 2 March 1919. The first prize was two thousand dollars; Gershwin received the lowest prize of a hundred dollars.
- 1920 – "Yan-Kee" (lyrics by Irving Caesar), published by T. B. Harms & Francis, Day & Hunter, Inc. (hereafter Harms)
- 1921 – "Phoebe" (lyrics by Ira Gershwin and Lou Paley)
- 1921 – "Something Peculiar" (lyrics by Ira Gershwin and Lou Paley)
- 1921 – "Dixie Rose," alternately "Swanee Rose" (lyrics by Irving Caesar and B. G. DeSylva), published under both titles by Harms; see above under Sinbad
- 1921 – "In the Heart of a Geisha" (lyrics by Fred Fisher, published by Fisher's firm)
- 1921 – "Tomale (I’m Hot for You)" (lyrics by B. G. DeSylva), published by Harms.
- c. 1921 – "Molly-on-the-Shore" (lyrics by Ira Gershwin)
- c. 1921 – "Mischa, Yascha, Toscha, Sascha" (lyrics by Ira Gershwin). This is Gershwin's only finished work based on a Jewish theme, and the title is a reference to the first names of four Jewish-Russian violinists, Mischa Elman, Jascha Heifetz, Toscha Seidel and Sascha Jacobsen.
- 1922 – "The Flapper" (lyrics by B. G. DeSylva)
- 1925 – "Harlem River Chanty" and "It’s a Great Little World!" (lyrics by Ira Gershwin, originally composed for Tip-Toes but not used)
- 1925 – "Murderous Monty (and Light-Fingered Jane)" (lyrics by Desmond Carter, composed for the London production of Tell Me More)
- 1926 – "I’d Rather Charleston" (lyrics by Desmond Carter, composed for the London production of Lady, Be Good)
- 1928 – "Beautiful Gypsy" and "Rosalie" (originally composed for Rosalie, but not used)
- 1929 – "Feeling Sentimental" (originally composed for Show Girl, but not used)
- 1929 – "In the Mandarin’s Orchid Garden" (lyrics by Ira Gershwin), intended for the abandoned musical East Is West; published by Harms in 1930
- c. 1930 – "Ask Me Again" (lyrics by Ira Gershwin)
- 1933 – "Till Then" (lyrics by Ira Gershwin), published by Harms
- 1936 – "Strike Up the Band for UCLA" (with the same music as "Strike Up the Band")
- 1937 – "Hi-Ho!" (lyrics by Ira Gershwin, originally composed for Shall We Dance, but not used)
- 1938 – "Dawn of a New Day" (lyrics by Ira Gershwin), published as "Song of the New York World's Fair"

== Sources ==
- Kimball, Robert (1993). The Complete Lyrics of Ira Gershwin (First ed.). New York: Alfred A. Knopf. ISBN 0-394-55651-8.
- Pollack, Howard (2006). George Gershwin: His Life and Work. University of California Press.
