= Ballet (music) =

Musical form

Ballet as a music form progressed from simply a complement to dance, to a concrete compositional form that often had as much value as the dance that went along with it. The dance form, originating in France during the 17th century, began as a theatrical dance. It was not until the 19th century that ballet gained status as a "classical" form. In ballet, the terms 'classical' and 'romantic' are chronologically reversed from musical usage. Thus, the 19th century Classical period in ballet coincided with the 19th century Romantic era in music. Ballet music composers from the 17th–20th centuries, including the likes of Jean-Baptiste Lully, Pyotr Ilyich Tchaikovsky, Igor Stravinsky, and Sergei Prokofiev, were predominantly in France and Russia. Yet with the increased international notoriety seen in Tchaikovsky's and Stravinsky's lifetime, ballet music composition and ballet in general spread across the western world.

== History ==
Until about the second half of the 19th century, the role of music in ballet was secondary, with the main emphasis on dance, while music was simply a compilation of danceable tunes. Writing "ballet music" used to be a job for musical craftsmen, rather than for masters. For example, critics of the Russian composer Pyotr Ilyich Tchaikovsky (1840–1893) mentioned his writing of ballet music as something demeaning.

From the earliest ballets up to the time of Jean-Baptiste Lully (1632–1687), ballet music was indistinguishable from ballroom dance music. Lully created a style that was separate, wherein the music told a story. The first ballet d'action was staged in 1717. The Loves of Mars and Venus was a story told without words. The pioneer was John Weaver (1673–1760). Both Lully and Jean-Philippe Rameau (1683–1764) wrote opéra-ballets, where the story was partly danced and partly sung, but ballet music became gradually less important.

The French danseuse Marie Sallé gained popularity during the early 18th century due to her usage of looser costuming that went against the more modestly-designed attire of dancers during this era. This initially scandalized audiences, but fascination from the court brought her to London where, in 1717, she danced in a production of Handel's Rinaldo, which subsequently caught the attention of the composer. The two crossed paths later, in 1725 and 1733 respectively, and after appearing in a widely acclaimed staging of Rameau's Pygmalion, gained far more appreciation in the English capital compared to her considerably critical Parisian audience. After being contracted at Covent Garden, Sallé began a long partnership with Handel which resulted in the composer writing ballet music for her in a handful of his operas, such as Il pastor fido, Ariodante and Alcina. After appearing onstage in man's attire, Sallé was aggressively hissed off stage and after her popularity in Britain waned, she returned to France.

The next big step occurred in the early years of the nineteenth century, when principal dancers changed from using hard shoes to ballet pumps. This enabled a more free-flowing style of music to be used. Marie Taglioni (1804–1884) is credited with being the first ballerina to dance en pointe in La Sylphide in 1832. It was now possible to have music that was more expressive. Gradually, dancing became more daring, with men lifting the ballerinas into the air.

Until the time of Tchaikovsky, the composer of ballets was considered to be separate from the composer of symphonies. Ballet music was an accompaniment for the solo and ensemble dances. Tchaikovsky's Swan Lake was the first ballet score to be created by a symphonic composer. Following the initiative of Tchaikovsky, ballet composers were no longer writing simple, easily danceable pieces. The focus of a ballet was no longer solely the dance; the music behind the dances began to take an equal prevalence. In the late 19th century, Marius Petipa, French ballet choreographer and dancer, worked with composers such as Cesare Pugni to create ballet masterpieces that boasted both complex dance and complex music. Petipa worked with Tchaikovsky as well, whether through collaboration with Tchaikovsky on his work The Sleeping Beauty and The Nutcracker, or indirectly through revision of Tchaikovsky's Swan Lake after the composer's death.

In many cases ballets were still short scenes within operas, to enable scenery or costume changes. Perhaps the best-known example of ballet music that is part of an opera is the Dance of the Hours from Amilcare Ponchielli's opera La Gioconda (1876). There was a violent change in mood when Igor Stravinsky's ballet The Rite of Spring was first performed in 1913, at the Théâtre des Champs-Élysées in Paris. The music was modernist and dissonant, and the movements were highly stylized. In 1924 George Antheil wrote Ballet Mécanique, which was actually for a film of moving objects, not for dancers, but it was pioneering in the use of jazz music. From this point dance music split into two directions: modern and jazz dance. George Gershwin attempted to bridge this gap with his ambitious score to the film Shall We Dance (1937), composing over one hour of music that spanned from the cerebral and technical to foot-stomping jazz and rumba. One scene, Hoctor's Ballet, was composed specifically for the ballerina Harriet Hoctor.

Another strand in the history of ballet music is the trend towards creative adaptations of old music. Ottorino Respighi took works by Gioachino Rossini (1792–1868) and strung them together into a ballet titled La Boutique fantasque, premiered in 1919. The audience for ballet generally prefers romantic music, hence new ballets are created from old works with new choreography. A well-known example is The Dream to the music of Felix Mendelssohn (1809–1847) arranged by John Lanchbery.

== Ballet composers ==
The following are some of the major ballet composers:

- Adolphe Adam
- Boris Asafyev
- Leonard Bernstein
- Arthur Bliss
- Nimrod Borenstein
- Victor Bruns
- Aaron Copland
- Léo Delibes
- Violeta Dinescu
- Riccardo Drigo
- Manuel de Falla
- Lorenzo Ferrero
- Alexander Glazunov
- Reinhold Glière
- Christoph Willibald Gluck
- Ferde Grofé
- Aram Khachaturian
- Jean-Baptiste Lully
- Darius Milhaud
- Ludwig Minkus
- Bruno Moretti
- Francis Poulenc
- Sergei Prokofiev
- Cesare Pugni
- Maurice Ravel
- Erik Satie
- Dmitri Shostakovich
- Igor Stravinsky
- Carlos Surinach
- Pyotr Ilyich Tchaikovsky
- Nikolai Tcherepnin
- Mark-Anthony Turnage
- Stefano Vagnini
- Dae-Ho Eom
