= Summertime: Willie Nelson Sings Gershwin =

Studio album by Willie Nelson
- Released: February 26, 2016
- Genre: Country, Jazz, Pop
- Length: 36:15
- Label: Legacy Recordings
- Producer: Buddy Cannon, Matt Rollings

Willie Nelson chronology
Django & Jimmie (2015)	Summertime: Willie Nelson Sings Gershwin (2016)	For The Good Times - A Tribute to Ray Price (2016)

Summertime: Willie Nelson Sings Gershwin is the 64th solo studio album by American singer-songwriter Willie Nelson. After being awarded the Gershwin Prize by the Library of Congress, Nelson recorded a set of pop standards written by George and Ira Gershwin. The recording of the album was produced by Buddy Cannon and Matt Rollings. It includes the duets "Let's Call The Whole Thing Off" with Cyndi Lauper and "Embraceable You" with Sheryl Crow.

To select the songs for the album, Nelson was inspired by the Frank Sinatra recordings of Gershwin songs. Meanwhile, he named the album after the song "Summertime", composed by George Gershwin, based on his past decision to name a record Stardust. On January 19, Nelson a video of the title-track as a preview to the release. The album was released by Legacy Recordings on February 26, 2016. Summertime: Willie Nelson Sings Gershwin won the Best Traditional Pop Vocal Album award at the 59th Annual Grammy Awards in 2017.

== Reception ==
In its first week, the album sold 13,000 copies. It debuted at number one on the Traditional Jazz and Top Jazz Albums Billboard charts, becoming Nelson's third album to top the latter. Meanwhile, it reached number fourteen in Top Album Sales and reached forty in the Billboard 200. The album has sold 35,000 copies in the United States as of August 2016.

== Personnel ==
As listed in the liner notes.

The Family

- Bobbie Nelson – piano
- Willie Nelson – acoustic guitar, lead vocals
- Mickey Raphael – harmonica

Additional musicians

- Jay Bellerose – drums
- Sheryl Crow – duet vocals on "Embraceable You"
- Paul Franklin – steel guitar
- Cyndi Lauper – duet vocals on "Let's Call the Whole Thing Off"
- Dean Parks – electric guitar, acoustic guitar
- David Piltch – upright bass
- Matt Rollings – organ

== Track listing ==
No.	Title	Length
1.	"But Not for Me"	3:16
2.	"Somebody Loves Me"	2:14
3.	"Someone to Watch Over Me"	4:05
4.	"Let's Call the Whole Thing Off (featuring Cyndi Lauper)"	3:06
5.	"It Ain't Necessarily So"	4:28
6.	"I Got Rhythm"	2:47
7.	"Love Is Here to Stay"	3:23
8.	"They All Laughed"	2:44
9.	"Embraceable You (featuring Sheryl Crow)"	3:38
10.	"They Can't Take That Away from Me"	2:54
11.	"Summertime"	3:52

== Charts ==
Chart (2016)	Peak position
Australian Albums (ARIA)	82
US Billboard 200	40
US Top Jazz Albums (Billboard)	1
