= Blue Monday (opera) =

Jazz opera by George Gershwin

- Cover of the Gregg Smith Singers' recording
- Music: George Gershwin
- Lyrics: Buddy DeSylva
- Book: Buddy DeSylva
- Productions: 1922 Broadway

Blue Monday (Opera à la Afro-American) was the original name of a one-act "jazz opera" by George Gershwin, renamed 135th Street during a later production. The English libretto was written by Buddy DeSylva. Though a short piece, with a running time of between twenty and thirty minutes, Blue Monday is often considered the blueprint to many of Gershwin's later works, and the "first piece of symphonic jazz" in that it was the first significant attempt to fuse forms of classical music such as opera with American popular music, with the opera largely influenced by Jazz and the African-American culture of Harlem.

== Characters ==
- Roles
  - Joe, a gambler, tenor
  - Vi, his sweetheart, lyric soprano
  - Tom, café entertainer and singer, baritone
  - Mike, café proprietor and manager, bass
  - Sam, café worker and custodian, baritone
  - Sweetpea, café pianist
- Chorus
  - Guests

As in Gershwin's later opera Porgy and Bess, all the singing roles are African-American characters. Unlike Porgy and Bess, however, the original production of Blue Monday was performed by white singers in blackface.

== Synopsis ==
Setting:
A basement café near the intersection of 135th Street and Lenox Avenue in Harlem, New York City.
Time:
An evening during the Jazz Age, beginning at around 9:30 P.M.

After a brief overture, the gambler Joe appears in front of the curtain as a Prologue, in a reference to the character Tonio's opening aria in Pagliacci. Like that number, which explained the serious nature of Leoncavallo's opera as if it were an actual event, Joe tells his audience that, just like "the white man's opera", this "colored [Harlem] tragedy enacted in operatic style" focuses on primal human emotions such as love, hate, passion, and jealousy, and that the moral of the story is that tragic results come from when a woman's intuition goes wrong (Joe: "Ladies and gentlemen!").

As the curtain rises on a café with a bar, gambling room, and dance floor, café owner Mike berates his worker Sam for his laziness and commands him to get to work. As Sam sweeps the floor, he relates that he resents "Blue Monday" because he always loses at dice gambling and it is the day when people die, and concludes that there is no use working on Mondays (Sam: "Blue Monday Blues"). The pianist Sweetpea arrives and plays for a while until the arrogant singer Tom comes in and knocks her out of the way, claiming that the only reason the café is still in business is his singing. Joe's sweetheart Vi enters, asking if anyone has seen her "lovin' man" Joe, whom she is supposed to be meeting for a date (Vi: "Has Anyone Seen My Joe?").

When Mike goes to the backroom to ask if anyone has seen Joe, Tom attempts to seduce and woo Vi. When Tom tells her that he loves her and asks what she sees in the gambler Joe, Vi angrily retorts that even if he gambles, Joe is a man and unique. Tom continues to try to persuade Vi to leave Joe for him and he attempts to kiss her, when Vi threatens him with a revolver that Joe had given her. Mike returns with the news that no one has seen Joe, and Vi leaves. Mike again calls Sam and scolds him for being lazy, and as Sam again sweeps the floor he sings a reprise the song "Blue Monday Blues" (Sam: "Monday's the day that all the earthquakes quiver"). This time Sam more directly foreshadows the event to come, as he states that "Monday's a day full of sad, sad news /... That's when a gal will pull a trigger, / A gal will pull a trigger".

Joe enters the café and Tom hides behind the piano to eavesdrop on his conversation with Mike. After Mike tells Joe that Vi has been looking for him and that he has heard that Joe won a large deal of money in a game of craps, Joe tells him that he is going to use the money to travel to the South the next morning to visit his mother, whom he hasn't seen in years and to whom he has recently sent a telegram (Joe: "I'll tell the world I did"). Joe says that he cannot tell Vi that he is going, and when asked why by Mike he says that she gets jealous and angry for irrational reasons. He then relates how he yearns to see his mother and return home (Joe: "I'm Gonna See My Mother").

Joe goes upstairs to meet Vi, and slowly the night's guests and customers arrive. After a dance, Vi tells him that she loves only him and although she is a jealous woman, if he remains true to her then she will be his (Vi: I love but you, my Joe, my Joe"). When Joe leaves to wait for a telegram from his mother, Tom tells Vi that he overheard Joe's conversation and that the telegram is from another woman. Vi initially refuses to believe him, but when Sweetpea arrives with Joe's telegram, Vi accuses Joe of infidelity and demands to see the telegram. Joe rebukes her by pushing her away, and when he opens the envelope Vi shoots him with the revolver from her handbag.

Vi reads the letter, sent in fact by Joe's sister, who states that there is no need for Joe to come South because his mother had been dead for three years. When she realizes what she has done, Vi sinks to the floor and begs Joe for forgiveness, which she receives. As Joe dies, he sings that he is finally going to see his mother in heaven. (Joe: "I'm Gonna See My Mother").

== Performance history, reception, and legacy ==
By 1922, the improvisational and melodic talent of George Gershwin, a former song-plugger for a music publishing firm on Tin Pan Alley, allowed him to write songs for three Broadway shows and then write complete scores for four (although because every one of his previous shows was a revue, Gershwin had basically no dramatic experience). Two of Gershwin's most successful works at this time were the scores to the 1920 and 1921 productions of George White's Scandals, a popular annual revue. Paul Whiteman, the music director and conductor of the Scandals of 1922 (with his Orchestra in the pit), which Gershwin was again hired for, had previously worked with him when the Paul Whiteman Orchestra recorded the latter's song "South Sea Island" in 1921.

Gershwin's lyricist Buddy DeSylva originally conceived a plan for writing a "jazz opera" set in Harlem and based on the Italian language verismo opera Pagliacci with Gershwin in the early 1920s, and Whiteman, who had built much of his reputation on such experimental fusions of different musical and dramatic genres, persuaded producer George White to include it in the 1922 Scandals. White was initially enthusiastic about an idea of a black "opera" because "A recent Broadway success was Shuffle Along, a show with an all-black cast—its words and music by the black creative team of Noble Sissle and Eubie Blake... White seems to have imagined that a black-oriented segment in the new edition of his revue would capitalize on Shuffle Along's appeal." However, after considering his decision, White realized that a thirty-minute operatic tragedy, or "one act vaudeville opera", as Gershwin called it, would disrupt the flow of his revue, and promptly reconsidered before Gershwin and DeSylva had begun writing. The latter two, however, were still the composer and lyricist of the rest of the revue, which included the later-famous song "I'll Build a Stairway to Paradise."

Three weeks before the opening of the show, White found that he was in need of a longer program and reverted to allowing the (unwritten) opera to be included in the show. Gershwin and DeSylva wrote the work in five days and five nights, and soon after completion it was orchestrated by Will Vodery, a very talented but relatively unknown African-American composer who had befriended Gershwin.

The premiere performance of Blue Monday was at the four Scandal's tryouts in New Haven, Connecticut, and it was received there very warmly and enthusiastically. Gershwin later wrote that what he referred to as his "composer's stomach", ailments which he would have for the rest of his life, originated in his nervousness on the opening night of Blue Monday. A few days after, it opened (and closed) on Broadway at the Globe Theatre on August 28, 1922. The opera itself did not gain a lot of acceptance because of its tragic ending, and was removed from the Scandals after only one performance.

Some critics saw the work as worse than just inappropriate for the Scandals, as Charles Darnton's review in the New York World called it "the most dismal, stupid, and incredible blackface sketch that has probably ever been perpetrated. In it a dusky soprano finally killed her gambling man. She should have shot all her associates the moment they appeared and then turned the pistol on herself." According to Reed College Professor of Music David Schiff, "With the appearance of black musicals like Shuffle Along and the emergence of black stars such as Paul Robeson and Ethel Waters, the minstrel convention of blackface, which survived in the vastly popular performances of Al Jolson and Eddie Cantor, had become an embarrassment – at least to some critics."

However, "Another critic... said it was a genuine human plot of American life and foreshadowed things to come from Gershwin," and another wrote that "This opera will be imitated in a hundred years." Most importantly, a third critic was relieved that "Here at last, is a genuinely human plot of American life, set to music in the American vein, using jazz only at the right moments, the blues, and above all, a new and free ragtime time recitative. In it we see the first gleam of a new American musical art." Many biographers and musicologists would see such an assessment as a prophetic prediction of the accomplishment that Gershwin would make thirteen years later with Porgy and Bess.

Blue Monday was one of Gershwin's premature works and lacks the musical and dramatic sophistication of his later musicals and Porgy and Bess, but jazz conductor Paul Whiteman, who conducted the original performance of the piece in 1922, was so impressed by it that he asked Gershwin to compose a symphonic jazz piece for Whiteman to conduct at a concert Whiteman was planning. The resulting piece, "Rhapsody in Blue," became Gershwin's most famous composition.

Arts consultant Jeffrey James claims that Blue Monday is the "genesis of the Rhapsody", and "the missing link in Gershwin's evolution into the Rhapsody in Blue" as well as a source to his Preludes, Piano Concerto and Porgy and Bess.

After its disastrous flop on Broadway, Blue Monday was reportedly renamed 135th Street when Ferde Grofé re-orchestrated it in 1925, with a concert performance at Carnegie Hall on December 29, 1925, under the direction of Paul Whiteman, preceded by a Whiteman performance in Washington, DC on 12 December 1925. A photostat of the original Grofé score exists in the Music and Recorded Sound Division of the New York Public Library and is titled Blue Monday (135th Street). In an unusually daring move for 1950s television, it was presented in that medium in 1953, as part of the famous anthology, Omnibus, under the title 135th Street. This production featured black singers, not white singers in blackface. Blue Monday is occasionally, though sparingly, revived both inside and outside of the United States, including a 1970 New York revival and recent productions in Adelaide, Australia, Livorno, Italy, Arlington, Virginia and Linz, Austria. A vocal score with a new orchestration by George Bassman was published in 1993. This version was recorded and released on CD that year.

An abbreviated version of Blue Monday, performed in blackface, was included in the 1945 film biography of Gershwin, Rhapsody in Blue. The sequence was a fictionalized, but basically true re-creation of the work's opening performance. Bandleader Paul Whiteman appeared as himself.

Note: Though it is true that at least some of the performers in the film - the leads who play Vi and Joe - are white and that their skin was evidently darkened, it is a question of body makeup and not the sort of blackface used in minstrel shows - as, for example, seen earlier in the picture when Jolson performs "Swanee".

== Preservation status ==
On September 22, 2013, it was announced that a musicological critical edition of the full orchestral score (with the original orchestrations by Will Vodery) will be eventually released. The Gershwin family, working in conjunction with the Library of Congress and the University of Michigan, are working to make scores available to the public that represent Gershwin's true intent.

The entire Gershwin project may take 30 to 40 years to complete, and it is unclear when the Blue Monday edition will be released.
