= Second Rhapsody =

Composition by George Gershwin

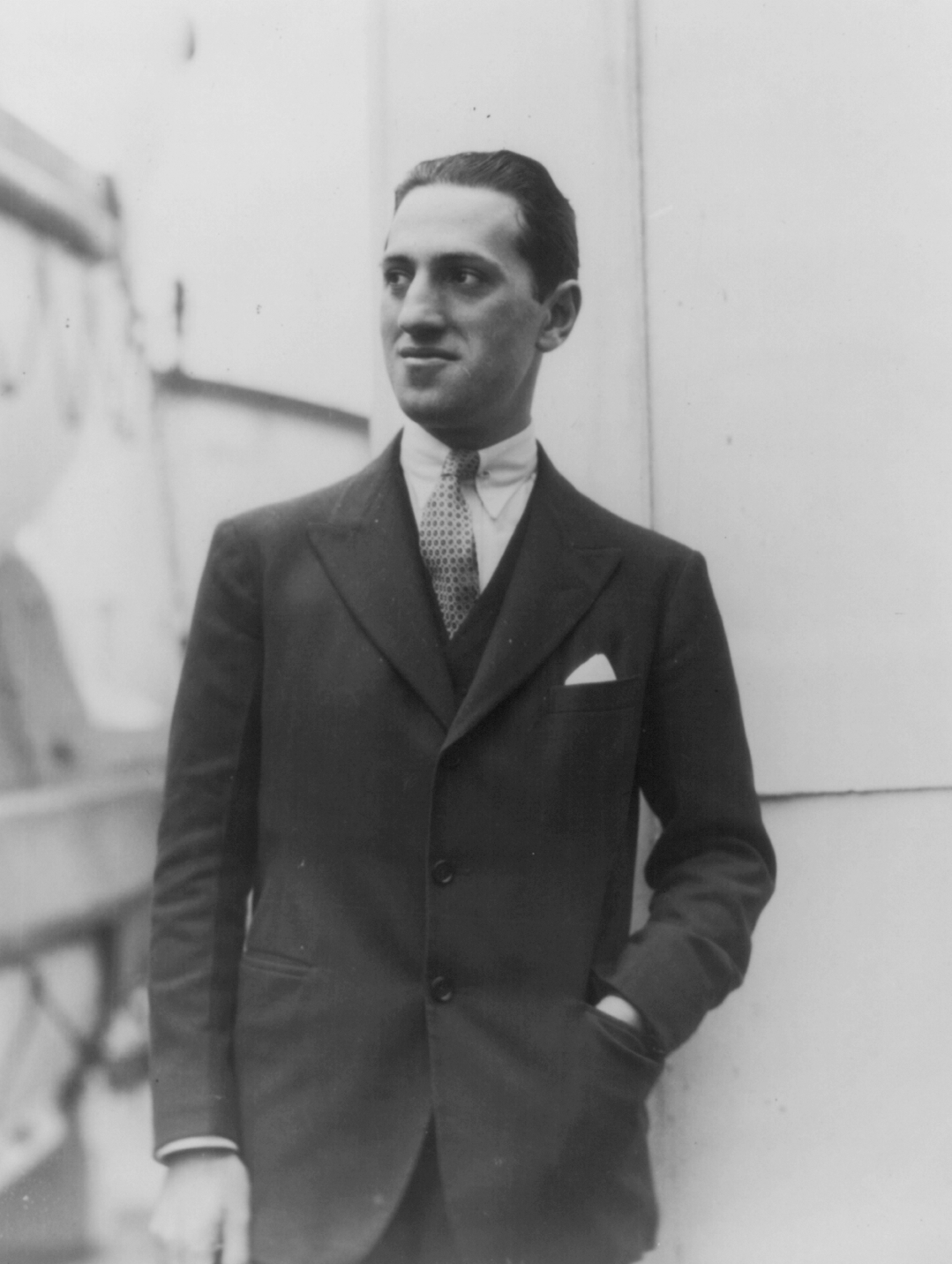
George Gershwin

The Second Rhapsody is a concert piece for orchestra with piano by American composer George Gershwin, written in 1931. It is sometimes referred to by its original title, Rhapsody in Rivets.

== Composition ==
In 1930, George Gershwin, together with his brother Ira Gershwin, was invited to go to Hollywood to provide the music for the film Delicious. After completing work on most of the film's songs and "The Melting Pot" sequence, George began sketching music to accompany an extended visual montage, where a character wanders the streets of New York. The initial title of this sequence was Manhattan Rhapsody, and renamed during the course of the film's production to New York Rhapsody, and finally to Rhapsody in Rivets. Gershwin completed the sketch just before returning to New York in late February 1931.

In New York, Gershwin began working on a full score of the Second Rhapsody on March 14, 1931, and completed the score on May 23. He was proud of this work, and commented: "In many respects, such as orchestration and form, it is the best thing I have written"

For use in the Delicious film sequence, the score was edited to fit into the sequence's length of seven minutes, eliminating more than half of the original music. This editing was possibly done by Hugo Friedhofer, a staff musician at the Fox film studio who had worked with Gershwin on his early sketch of the Rhapsody. Gershwin himself later deleted the opening trio with piano, cello and violin.

== Premiere ==
On June 26, 1931, Gershwin conducted New York musicians and played the piano solo in a run-through of the Rhapsody. He had the rehearsal professionally recorded, but it was never commercially issued. Years later, Ira Gershwin provided the recording so that it could be issued on LP. In 1991, the historic performance was issued on CD by Musicmasters. Orchestrations differ greatly in several areas from Gershwin's final version (and McBride's later reorchestration). Several piano solos and other parts of the Rhapsody that were later deleted by Gershwin can be heard on this recording.

The piece received its premiere in Boston Symphony Hall by Boston Symphony Orchestra under the baton of Serge Koussevitzky on January 29, 1932, with the composer himself playing the piano part. The New York premiere was given a few days later.

== Rescoring by publisher ==
The form most commonly heard today is a re-orchestrated version by Robert McBride created fourteen years after Gershwin's death. McBride was assigned by Frank Campbell-Watson (the music editor for Gershwin's publisher New World Music) to completely rescore the piece. Since this version is the only one offered by the publisher, it has been almost impossible for orchestras to perform the piece as Gershwin envisioned it. However, the 1931 recording of a run-through of the music, with Gershwin playing the solos and conducting the orchestra, gives some idea of the original version; this recording has been released on CD, Gershwin Performs Gershwin - Rare Recordings 1931-1935 (Jazz Heritage-512923A, 1991).

Most of Gershwin's orchestrations have been vastly simplified. Many string passages were reassigned to other instruments (for example, the string quartet portion of the adagio was rescored for violin, clarinet, oboe, and cello), or instruments that formerly had solos now have other instruments doubling their passages. Also, eight measures excised by the composer were re-added to the recapitulation by the editor.

Michael Tilson Thomas has been a promulgator of Gershwin's original 1931 version. He sought out the original manuscript in the library as the basis of his 1985 recording and for his later performances. In 2008 Gershwin specialist Jack Gibbons made his own restoration of the original 1931 orchestration of Second Rhapsody, working directly from Gershwin's original manuscript, performing it for the first time at London's Cadogan Hall on June 4, 2008 with the New London Orchestra conducted by Ronald Corp The original version (including Gershwin's original extra piano cadenza) was also performed at Carnegie Hall in New York on May 7, 2013, by the Albany Symphony Orchestra and pianist Kevin Cole.

== Preservation status ==
On September 22, 2013, it was announced that a musicological critical edition of the full orchestral score will be eventually released. The Gershwin family, working in conjunction with the Library of Congress and the University of Michigan, are working to make scores available to the public that represent Gershwin's true intent. It is unclear if the critical score will include the material Gershwin later deleted from the Rhapsody, or if the scores will document changes in the orchestration during Gershwin's composition process. It is also unknown if the critical score will also include McBride's subsequent reorchestration (in order to provide context to historical recordings of the work).

Though the entire Gershwin project may take 30 to 40 years to complete, it is likely that Second Rhapsody will be an early release.
