= Rhapsody in Blue (album) =

Studio album by Uri Caine
- Released: August 13, 2013
- Recorded: December 2012
- Studios: Avatar (New York, New York)
- Genre: Jazz
- Length: 57:59
- Label: Winter & Winter 910 205-2
- Producer: Stefan Winter

Uri Caine chronology
Sonic Boom (2012)	Rhapsody in Blue (2013)	Callithump (2014)

Alternative cover
- Vinyl LP cover, edition strictly limited to 500 numbered copies.

Professional ratings
Review scores
Source	Rating
All About Jazz	5/5 stars

Rhapsody in Blue is a studio album by pianist Uri Caine. The album was released as a CD on August 13, 2013 via Winter & Winter label. A special vinyl LP edition of the album was also released, strictly limited to 500 numbered copies. This release does not have track 9.

== Background ==
Uri Caine Ensemble plays nine famous songs written by George Gershwin and Ira Gershwin. Caine names the album after Gershwin’s masterpiece "Rhapsody in Blue"—as the centerpiece of his new Gershwin interpretations. Caine and Gershwin are connected not only though Jewish East European origin of their families but also through New York City.

== Track listing ==
No.	Title	Writer(s)	Length
1.	"Rhapsody in Blue"	George Gershwin	22:28
2.	"But Not for Me"	George Gershwin / Ira Gershwin	3:56
3.	"Let's Call the Whole Thing Off"	George Gershwin / Ira Gershwin	3:52
4.	"I Got Rhythm"	George Gershwin	3:17
5.	"I've Got a Crush on You"	George Gershwin / Ira Gershwin	5:11
6.	"They Can't Take That Away from Me"	George Gershwin / Ira Gershwin	6:44
7.	"Slap That Bass"	George Gershwin / Ira Gershwin	3:25
8.	"Love Is Here to Stay"	George Gershwin	2:59
9.	"How Long Has This Been Going On?"	George Gershwin	6:07
Total length:			57:59

== Personnel ==
Uri Caine Ensemble

- Uri Caine – adaptation, arranger, piano
- Ralph Alessi – trumpet
- Jim Black – drums
- Theo Bleckmann – vocals
- Joyce Hammann – violin
- Mark Helias – bass
- Chris Speed – clarinet, tenor sax
- Barbara Walker – vocals

Production

- Sinje Dillenkofer – photography
- Stefan Winter – producer
- Takahashi Winter – executive producer
- Adrian von Ripka – editing, mastering
