= Shall We Dance (1937 film) =

1937 film by Mark Sandrich

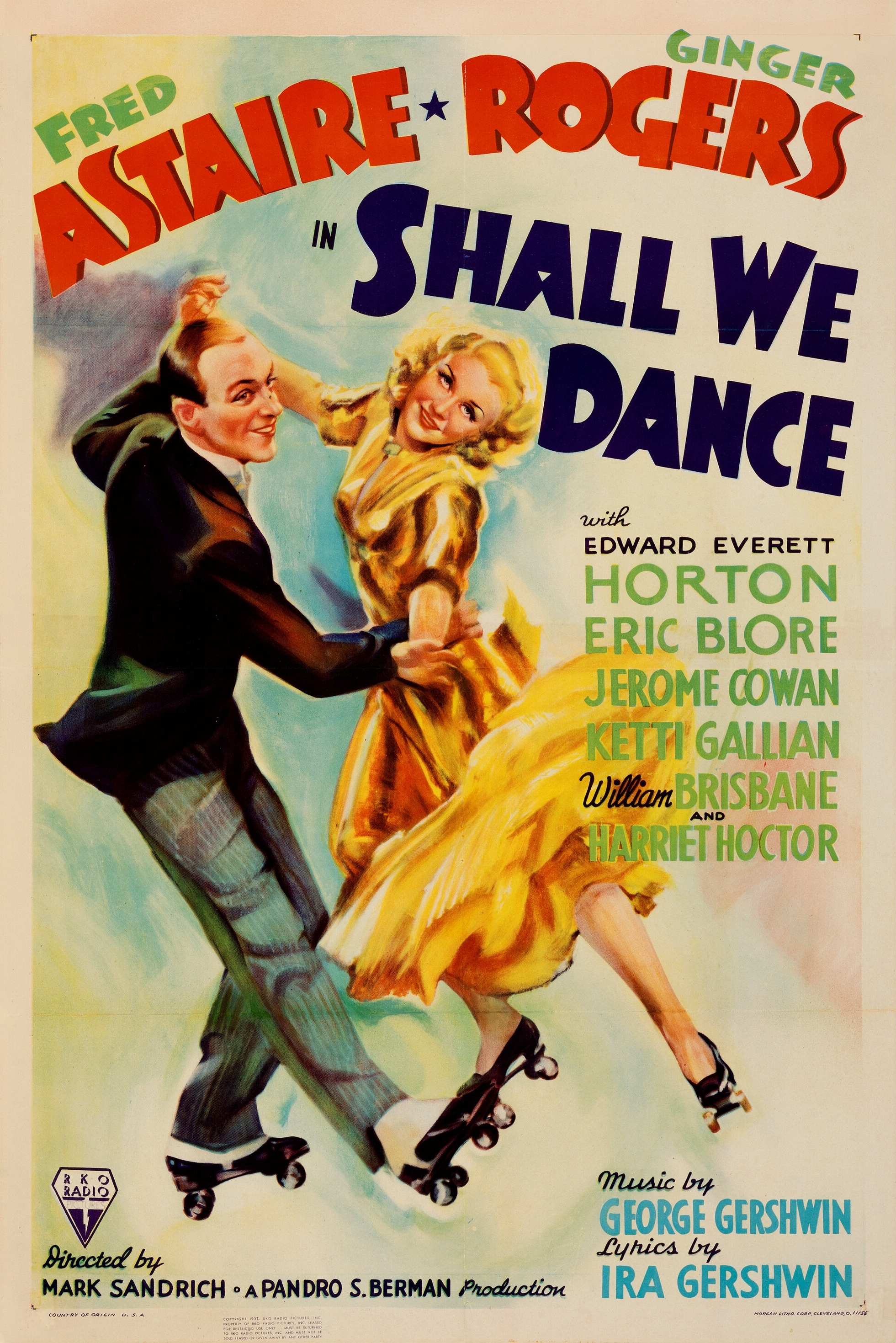
- theatrical release poster
- Directed by: Mark Sandrich
- Screenplay by: Allan Scott; Ernest Pagano
- Story by: Lee Loeb; Harold Buchman
- Produced by: Pandro S. Berman
- Starring: Fred Astaire; Ginger Rogers
- Cinematography: David Abel; Joseph F. Biroc
- Edited by: William Hamilton
- Music by: George Gershwin (music); Ira Gershwin (lyrics)
- Production company: RKO Radio Pictures
- Distributed by: RKO Radio Pictures
- Release date: May 7, 1937 (U.S.)
- Running time: 109 minutes
- Country: United States
- Language: English
- Budget: $991,000
- Box office: $2,168,000

Shall We Dance is a 1937 American musical comedy film directed by Mark Sandrich. It is the seventh of the ten Fred Astaire-Ginger Rogers films. The story follows a Russian-imposter ballet dancer (Astaire) who falls in love with a tap dancer (Rogers); the tabloid press concocts a story of their marriage, after which life imitates art. George Gershwin wrote the symphonic underscore and Ira Gershwin the lyrics, for their second Hollywood musical. It inspired the 1996 Japanese-language remake of the same name.

== Plot ==
Peter P. Peters is an amiable American ballet dancer billed as "Petrov", who cultivates a public image of being a serious, demanding and temperamental Russian, though his employer knows the truth. Peters dances for a ballet company in Paris owned by the bumbling Jeffrey Baird. Baird secretly never wants to blend classical ballet with modern jazz dancing because he thinks it does not look very professional.

When Peters sees a photo of famous tap dancer Linda Keene, he falls in love with her. He contrives to meet her (as "Petrov"), but she is less than impressed. They meet again on an ocean liner traveling back to New York, and Linda warms to Petrov. Their interactions spark a tabloid campaign that they are (or are perhaps not) married. Unknown to them, their associates create a publicity stunt, staging bedroom pictures of the two together captured using a lifelike wax figurine for Keene and a cluelessly asleep Peters and giving them to the press to "prove" their marriage. Believing it was Peters' idea to force her into marrying him to preserve her reputation, she is outraged, and in spite immediately becomes engaged to the bumbling Jim Montgomery. This sets off both Peters and Arthur Miller, her manager, who secretly launches more fake publicity.

Peters (who by now has revealed his true identity) and Keene, unable to squelch the rumor, decide to secretly marry to avoid the scandal these forged bedroom pictures will create if they don't wed, and then immediately get divorced. Linda begins to fall in love with Peters, but then accidentally discovers him with another woman, and leaves before he can explain that she was an old flame, Lady Denise Tarrington, unaware of his marriage and still pursuing him. Later, when Keene comes to his new show to personally serve him divorce papers, she sees him dancing with dozens of women all wearing masks with her face on them: Peters has decided that if he cannot dance with Linda, he will dance with images of her. Seeing that he truly loves her, she happily joins him dancing onstage.

== Cast ==
- Fred Astaire as Peter P. "Petrov" Peters
- Ginger Rogers as Linda Keene
- Edward Everett Horton as Jeffrey Baird
- Eric Blore as Cecil Flintridge
- Jerome Cowan as Arthur Miller
- Ketti Gallian as Lady Denise Tarrington
- William Brisbane as Jim Montgomery
- Harriet Hoctor as herself
- Dudley Dickerson as singing crew member in "Slap That Bass"
- Charlie Hall (actor, born 1899) as Ship's Bartender (uncredited)

== Music ==
George Gershwin – who had become famous for blending jazz with classical forms – wrote each scene in a different style of dance music, and he composed one scene specifically for the ballerina Harriet Hoctor. Ira Gershwin seemed decidedly less excited by the idea; none of his lyrics make reference to the notion of blending different styles of dance (such as ballet and jazz), and Astaire was also not enthusiastic about the concept.

The score of Shall We Dance is probably the largest source of Gershwin orchestral works unavailable to the general public, at least since the advent of modern stereo recording techniques in the 1950s. The movie contains the only recordings of some of the instrumental pieces currently available to Gershwin aficionados (although not all the incidental music composed for the movie was used in the final cut). Some of the cuts arranged and orchestrated by Gershwin include: "Dance of the Waves", "Waltz of the Red Balloons", "Graceful and Elegant", "Hoctor's Ballet" and "French Ballet Class". The instrumental track "Walking the Dog", however, has been frequently recorded and has been played from time to time on classical music radio stations.

Nathaniel Shilkret, musical director for the movie, hired Jimmy Dorsey and all or part of the Dorsey band as the nucleus of a fifty-piece studio orchestra including strings. Dorsey was in Hollywood at the time working the "Kraft Music Hall" radio show on NBC hosted by Bing Crosby. Dorsey is heard soloing on "Slap That Bass", "Walking the Dog" and "They All Laughed".

Gershwin was already suffering during the production of the motion picture from the brain tumor that was shortly to kill him, and Shilkret (as well as Robert Russell Bennett) contributed by assisting with orchestration on some of the numbers.

=== Musical numbers ===
Hermes Pan collaborated with Astaire on the choreography throughout and Harry Losee was brought in to help with the ballet finale. Gershwin modeled the score on the great ballets of the 19th century, but with obvious swing and jazz influences, as well as polytonalism. While Astaire made further attempts—notably in Ziegfeld Follies (1944/46), Yolanda and the Thief (1945) and Daddy Long Legs (1955)—it was his rival and friend Gene Kelly who would eventually succeed in creating a modern original dance style based on this concept. Some critics have attributed Astaire's discomfort with ballet (he briefly studied ballet in the 1920s) to his oft-expressed disdain for "inventing up to the arty".

- "Overture to Shall We Dance":was written by George Gershwin in 1937 as the introduction to his score for Shall We Dance. Performance time runs about four minutes. "The opening [number] is in Gershwin's best big-city style; propulsive, nervous, bustling with modern harmonies; it might have easily been developed into a full-scale composition except that time was growing short."
- "French Ballet Class" written in the style of the galop. This sequence was meant to accompany a scene of dozens of ballet dancers practicing their positions. Only two minutes of this music was used in the final film.
- "Rehearsal Fragments": In a brief segment which seeks to motivate the film's core dance concept, Astaire illustrates the idea of combining "the technique of ballet with the warmth and passion of this other mood" by performing two ballet leaps, the second of which is followed by a tap barrage.
- "Rumba Sequence": Astaire watches a flip book showing a brief orchestral rumba danced by Ginger Rogers and Pete Theodore, choreographed by Hermes Pan; it is Rogers' only partnered dance without Astaire in the ten-film series of Astaire-Rogers musicals. The increasing complexity and chromaticism in Gershwin's music can be detected between music for this sequence and Gershwin's earlier effort at a rumba, the Cuban Overture, written five years earlier. Scored for chamber orchestra.
- "(I've Got) Beginner's Luck": A brief comic tap solo with cane where Astaire's rehearsing to a record of the number is cut short when the record gets stuck.
- "Waltz of the Red Balloons" written in the style of a valse joyeaux.
- "Slap That Bass": In a mixed race number unusual for its time, Astaire encounters a group of African-American musicians holding a jam session in a spotless, Art Deco-inspired ship's engine room. Dudley Dickerson introduces the first verse of the song whose chorus is then taken up by Astaire. The virtuoso tap solo which follows is the first substantial musical number in the picture, and can be seen as a successor to the "I'd Rather Lead A Band" solo from Follow the Fleet (1936)—which also took place aboard ship—this time introducing a vertical element to the predominantly linear choreography, some pointedly dismissive references to ballet positions, and a middle section similarly without musical accompaniment but now imaginatively supported by rhythmic engine noises. George Gershwin's color home-movie footage of Astaire rehearsing this number was discovered only in the 1990s.
- "Dance of the Waves": written in the style of a barcarolle.
- "Walking the Dog": This was only published in 1960 as "Promenade" to accompany two pantomimic routines for Astaire and Rogers. This is the only part of the score besides Hoctor's Ballet to be published for performance in the concert hall, thus far. Scored for chamber orchestra. (Not all of the Walking the Dog sequence heard in the movie is in the published score, the ending of the scene features the themes following each other in a round (music).)
- "Beginner's Luck" (song): Astaire delivers this song to a non-committal Rogers, whose skepticism is echoed by a pack of howling dogs intervening at the close.
- "Graceful and Elegant": another waltz written by Gershwin, this one written in the style of the pas de deux (the first of two pas de deux in the score)
- "They All Laughed (at Christopher Columbus)": Ginger Rogers sings the introduction of Gershwin's now-classic song and is then joined by Astaire in a comic dance duet which begins with a ballet parody: Astaire in a mock-Russian accent invites Rogers to "tweeest" but after she pointedly fails to respond the pair revert to a tap routine which ends with Astaire lifting Rogers onto a piano.
- "Let's Call the Whole Thing Off": The genesis of the joke in Ira Gershwin's famous lyrics is uncertain: Ira has claimed the idea occurred to him in 1926 and remained unused. Astaire and Rogers sing alternate verses of this quickstep before embarking on a partnered comic tap dance on roller skates in a Central Park skating rink. Astaire uses the circular form of the rink to introduce a variation of the "oompah-trot" he and his sister Adele had made famous in vaudeville.
- "They Can't Take That Away from Me": The Gershwins' famous foxtrot, a serene, nostalgic declaration of love; one of their most enduring creations and one of George's personal favorites—is introduced by Astaire. As with "The Way You Look Tonight" in Swing Time (1936), it was decided to reprise the melody as part of the film's dance finale. George Gershwin was unhappy about this, writing "They literally throw one or two songs away without any kind of plug". Astaire and Rogers said individually during their lives the song was one of their favourite personal songs, and they rescued it for The Barkleys of Broadway in (1949), his final reunion with Rogers, creating one of their most admired essays in romantic partnered dance, and it was the only occasion on film when Astaire permitted himself to repeat a song he had performed in a previous film. George Gershwin died two months after the film's release, and he was posthumously nominated for the Academy Award for Best Original Song for this song at the 1937 Academy Awards.
- "Hoctor's Ballet": The film's big production number begins with a ballet featuring a female chorus and ballet soloist Harriet Hoctor whose specialty was performing an elliptical backbend en pointe, a routine she had perfected during her vaudeville days and as a headline act with the Ziegfeld Follies. Astaire approaches and the pair perform a duet to a reprise of the music to "They Can't Take That Away From Me". This number runs directly into:
- "Shall We Dance/ Finale and Coda": After a brief routine for Astaire and a female chorus, each wearing Ginger masks, he departs and Hoctor returns to deliver two variations on her backbend routine. Astaire now returns in top hat, white tie and tails and delivers a rendition of the title song; urging his audience to "drop that long face/come on have your fling/why keep nursing the blues" and follows this with a zestful half-minute tap solo. Other musical nods are interwoven referencing the previous ballet sequences. Finally, Ginger arrives on stage, masked to blend in with the chorus whereupon Astaire unmasks her and they dance a brief final duet. This routine was referenced in the 1999 romantic comedy Simply Irresistible.

== Production ==
The idea for the film originated in the studio's desire to exploit the successful formula created by Richard Rodgers and Lorenz Hart with their 1936 Broadway hit On Your Toes. In a major coup for RKO, Pandro Berman managed to attract the Gershwins – George Gershwin, who wrote the symphonic underscore, and Ira Gershwin, the lyrics – to score this, their second Hollywood musical after Delicious in 1931.

The film – Astaire and Rogers's most expensive to date – features well-known comedic actors in support, art direction by Carroll Clark under Van Nest Polglase's supervision, and a score which introduces three Gershwin songs that went on to become classics.

Astaire was no stranger to the Gershwins, having headlined, with his sister Adele, two Gershwin Broadway shows: Lady Be Good! in 1924 and Funny Face in 1927. George Gershwin also accompanied the pair on piano in a set of recordings in 1926. Rogers first came to Hollywood's attention when she appeared in the Gershwins' 1930 stage musical Girl Crazy.

Shall We Dance was named at the suggestion of Vincente Minnelli, who was a friend of the Gershwins. Minnelli originally suggested "Shall We Dance?" with a question mark, which disappeared at some point.

The car used on the ferry was 1936 Packard Twelve Coupe Roadster.

== Reception ==
Shall We Dance earned $1,275,000 in the US and Canada and $893,000 elsewhere, resulting in a profit of $413,000, less than half the previous Astaire-Rogers film. It also was not a critical success and was taken as an indication that the Astaire-Rogers pairing was slipping in its audience appeal.

== Recognition ==
The film is recognized by American Film Institute in these lists:

- 2004: AFI's 100 Years...100 Songs:
  - "Let's Call the Whole Thing Off" – #34

== Preservation status ==
On September 22, 2013, it was announced that a musicological critical edition of the full orchestral score of Shall We Dance will eventually be released. The Gershwin family, working in conjunction with the Library of Congress and the University of Michigan, are working to make scores available to the public that represent Gershwin's true intent. The entire Gershwin project may take 30 to 40 years to complete, and it is unclear when Shall We Dance will be released. Other than the sequences Hoctor's Ballet and Walking The Dog, it will be the first time the score has been published.

== See also ==
- Fred Astaire's solo and partnered dances
