= Freddie and Max =

1990 British television sitcom

- Genre: Sitcom
- Written by: Dick Clement; Ian La Frenais
- Directed by: John Stroud
- Starring: Anne Bancroft; Charlotte Coleman; Richard Pearson; Ian Congdon-Lee; Flaminia Cinque
- Theme music composer: David Mackay
- Opening theme: "Let's Call the Whole Thing Off" (Music by George Gershwin, lyrics by Ira Gershwin)
- Ending theme: "Let's Call the Whole Thing Off" (Music by George Gershwin, lyrics by Ira Gershwin)
- Country of origin: United Kingdom
- Original language: English
- No. of series: 1
- No. of episodes: 6

Production
- Executive producers: Tony Charles; Allan McKeown
- Producer: John Stroud
- Running time: 30 minutes
- Production companies: SelecTV; Thames Television

Original release
- Network: ITV
- Release: 12 November – 17 December 1990

Freddie and Max is a British sitcom that first aired on ITV and broadcast for one series and six episodes between 12 November and 17 December 1990. It starred Anne Bancroft as Maxine Chandler, a fading Hollywood star, and Charlotte Coleman as Freddie Latham, her scrappy personal assistant. The series ran for one series of six episodes. The show was produced by Thames Television for the ITV network.

== Premise ==
Maxine Chandler is an egotistical former Hollywood actress who has been residing at the famed Savoy Hotel in London. She is careless with finances and has not worked for many years. Pressed by her agent, Maxine needs to hire a new personal assistant who will help her work on her autobiography. Freddie Latham, a young Cockney woman, happens to wile her way into the job. Freddie is never afraid to confront Max about her behaviour, leading to comedic clashes and genuine moments of friendship.

== Cast ==
- Anne Bancroft as Maxine Chandler
- Charlotte Coleman as Freddie Latham
- Richard Pearson as Malcolm Parkes
- Ian Congdon-Lee as Gary
- Flaminia Cinque as Isabel

== Episodes ==
No.	Title	Directed by	Written by	Airdate
1	"Episode 1"	John Stroud	Dick Clement and Ian La Frenais	12 November 1990
2	"Episode 2"	John Stroud	Dick Clement and Ian La Frenais	19 November 1990
3	"Episode 3"	John Stroud	Dick Clement and Ian La Frenais	26 November 1990
4	"Episode 4"	John Stroud	Dick Clement and Ian La Frenais	3 December 1990
5	"Episode 5"	John Stroud	Dick Clement and Ian La Frenais	10 December 1990
6	"Episode 6"	John Stroud	Dick Clement and Ian La Frenais	17 December 1990

== Production ==
The series was written by Dick Clement and Ian La Frenais and directed by John Stroud. It was produced by John Stroud, Tony Charles, and Allan McKeown for Thames Television. It was, at the time, Britain's most expensive sitcom at a reported cost of £2 million.

== Reception ==
According to Adam's Nostalgic Memories, "This is yet another 90s ITV sitcom", now was this one any good? I don’t remember this from the time, but I have tracked down all of the episodes on YouTube. Freddie and Max was written by Dick Clement and Ian La Frenais, the double-act who were behind classic sitcoms including The Likely Lads and Porridge, so that was definitely a plus. This was made by their production company for Thames.

The main characters were Freddie, played by Charlotte Coleman of Worzel Gummidge and Marmalade Atkins fame, among plenty of other things, and Max, played by Anne Bancroft, in her only sitcom role. The opening theme was their rather terrible version of "Let's Call the Whole Thing Off", which was an indication of what was to come.

== Home media ==
To this date, the series was not yet released on DVD or VHS.
