= Slap That Bass =

1937 song by Fred Astaire

Song by Fred Astaire
- B-side: "They All Laughed"
- Published: 1937 by Chappell & Co.
- Released: April 1937
- Recorded: March 21, 1937
- Studio: Los Angeles, California
- Genre: Jazz, Pop Vocal
- Label: Brunswick 7856
- Composer(s): George Gershwin
- Lyricist(s): Ira Gershwin

Fred Astaire singles chronology
"They Can't Take That Away from Me" (1937)	"Slap That Bass" (1937)	"Let's Call the Whole Thing Off" (1937)

"Slap That Bass" is a song composed by George Gershwin, with lyrics by Ira Gershwin, introduced by Fred Astaire and Dudley Dickerson in the 1937 film Shall We Dance.

The song refers to the slap style of double bass playing that was popular at the time.

== Notable recordings ==
- Uri Caine – Rhapsody in Blue (2013)
- Georgia Brown – Georgia Brown Sings Gershwin/Georgia Brown (2003)
- Ella Fitzgerald – Ella Fitzgerald Sings the George and Ira Gershwin Songbook (1959)
- Susannah McCorkle – How Do You Keep the Music Playing (1985)
- Chris Connor – Chris Connor Sings the George Gershwin Almanac of Song (1957)
