= Cleveland Pops Orchestra =

American professional orchestra

The Cleveland Pops Orchestra is a non-profit professional American pops orchestra based in Cleveland, Ohio. As is typical of pops orchestras, the ensemble performs popular music (generally traditional pop), cinematic music, jazz, and show tunes as well as well-known classical works. The orchestra was founded in 1995 and performs most of its concerts at Severance Hall. The orchestra enjoys a friendly relationship with the Cleveland Orchestra and has appeared in concert at the Cleveland Orchestra's Blossom Festival. The orchestra is led by conductor Carl Topilow.
