= Matt Rollings =

American composer and keyboardist

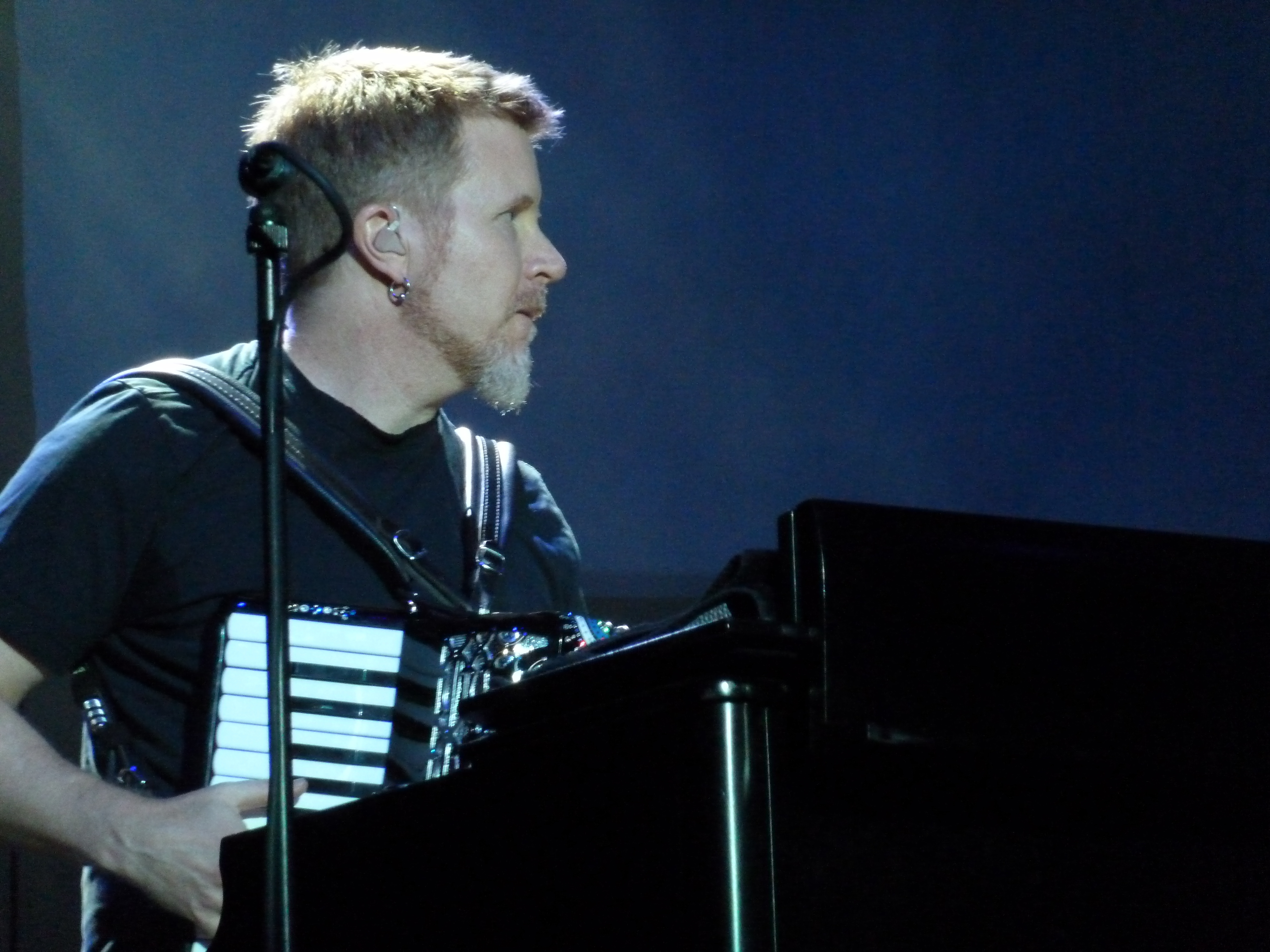
- Matt on tour with Mark Knopfler at O2 World, Berlin in 2010

Background information
- Origin: Bridgeport, Connecticut, U.S.
- Genres: Jazz, country, rock
- Occupations: Musician, record producer
- Instrument: Keyboards
- Years active: 1986–present
- Label: MCA
- Website: mattrollings.com

Matt Rollings is a Grammy Award–winning American composer, keyboard player, arranger and record producer.

Rollings was a session musician in Nashville from 1986 to 2006. During that period, he was nominated for the Country Music Association (CMA) Musician of the Year Award eight times, and won the Academy of Country Music (ACM) Keyboardist of the Year award ten times.

Known for his work in Lyle Lovett's Large Band, Rollings has worked with many artists, not all country. Rollings won the 'Best Traditional Pop Vocal Album' Grammy Award in 2016 for producing the Willie Nelson studio album Summertime: Willie Nelson Sings Gershwin, and again in 2018 for the album My Way: Willie Nelson Sings Sinatra.

Rollings released the jazz album Balconies in 1990 on MCA Masters, featuring John Pattituci and Carlos Vega. In 2020 he released Matt Rollings Mosaic which featured Lyle Lovett, Willie Nelson, Alison Krauss, and others. In 2023 Rollings released another jazz trio recording, The Valentine Sessions, which featured David Piltch on bass.

Rollings was featured on Mark Knopfler's 2004–2005 Shangri-La world tour as a keyboardist, and toured with him again in 2006, 2008 and 2010.

In 2018 and 2019, he toured with Alison Krauss, produced Blues Traveler’s thirteenth album Hurry Up & Hang Around, and also received two Grammy Award nominations for his work producing Willie Nelson’s My Way: Willie Nelson Sings Sinatra (Best Traditional Pop Vocal Album and Best Arrangement, Instruments and Vocals). In 2020, Nelson's That's Life was again nominated for the Best Traditional Pop Vocal Album Grammy.

In 2022, Rollings produced and arranged Rita Wilson's album of duets Now and Forever: Duets featuring Keith Urban, Jackson Brown, Elvis Costello, Smokey Robinson, and others.
