= Walking the Dog (Gershwin) =

Musical piece by George Gershwin

- by George Gershwin
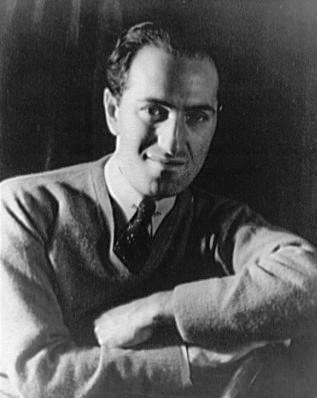
- Gershwin, 1937
- Key: C major
- Catalogue: IGG 14
- Genre: Film score
- Form: Orchestra
- Commissioned by: Nathaniel Shilkret
- Performed: 1937
- Published: 1960

Walking the Dog is one of many musical numbers written in 1937 by George Gershwin for the score for the Fred Astaire – Ginger Rogers film Shall We Dance. In the film, the music accompanies a sequence of walking a dog on board a luxury liner. In 1960, the sequence was published as "Promenade".

Most of the score from the film (composed and orchestrated by Gershwin) remains unpublished and unavailable in modern stereo recordings.

On September 22, 2013, it was announced that a musicological critical edition of the full orchestral score would be released, as a result of collaboration between the Gershwin family, the Library of Congress and the University of Michigan. The entire Gershwin project may take 30 to 40 years to complete, and it is unknown when the score to Shall We Dance (which includes Walking The Dog) will be released.

It is unknown whether the critical edition will include the round section heard on the soundtrack.

== See also ==
- List of compositions by George Gershwin
