= Cuban Overture =

Symphonic tone poem by George Gershwin

- by George Gershwin
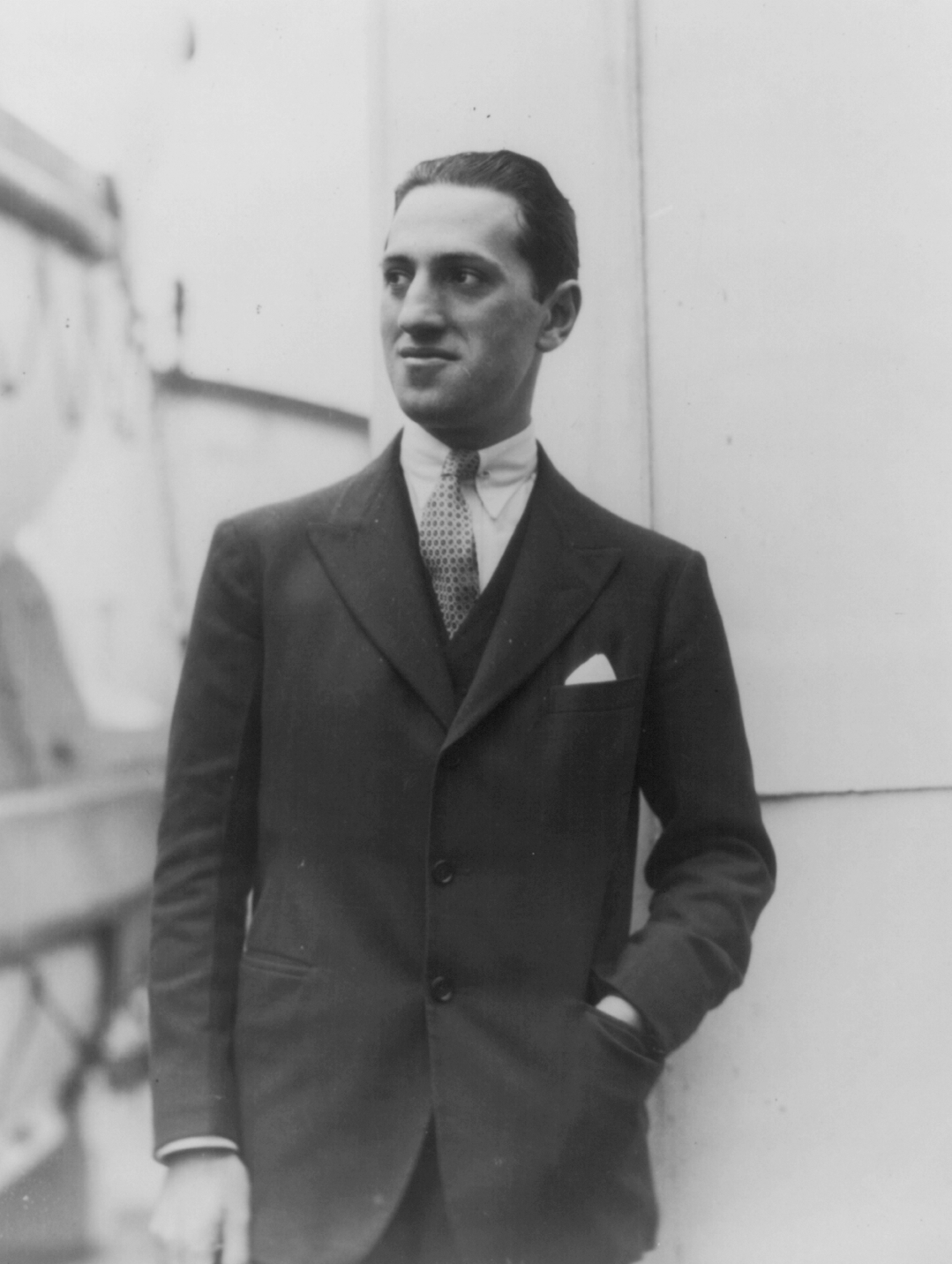
- George Gershwin
- Genre: Tone poem
- Form: Ternary form
- Composed: July and August 1932

Premiere
- Date: August 16, 1932
- Location: Lewisohn Stadium

Cuban Overture is a symphonic overture or tone poem for orchestra composed by American composer George Gershwin. Originally titled Rumba (named for the Cuban rumba musical genre), it was a result of a two-week holiday which Gershwin took in Havana, Cuba in February 1932. Gershwin composed the piece in July and August 1932.

The overture is dominated by Caribbean rhythms and Cuban native percussion, with a wide spectrum of instrumental color and technique. It is a rich and exciting work with complexity and sophistication, illustrating the influence of Cuban music and dance. Its main theme was influenced by a then current hit by Ignacio Piñeiro, "Échale Salsita".

Other songs referenced by the piece's themes and phrases include the traditional folk song "La Paloma".

The overture is in ternary form.

== Première ==
The work under the title Rumba received its première at New York's now-demolished Lewisohn Stadium on 16 August 1932, as part of an all-Gershwin programme held by New York Philharmonic, conducted by Albert Coates. The concert was a huge success. As Gershwin wrote:

It was, I really believe, the most exciting night I have ever had...17,845 people paid to get in and just about 5,000 were at the closed gates trying to fight their way in—unsuccessfully.

The work was greeted favorably by critics. It was renamed Cuban Overture three months later at a benefit concert conducted by Gershwin at the Metropolitan Opera to avoid giving audience the idea that it was simply a novelty item. The new title provided, as the composer stated, "a more just idea of the character and intent of the music."

== Scoring ==
The overture is scored for three flutes (third doubling piccolo), two oboes, English Horn, two clarinets in B♭, bass clarinet, two bassoons, contrabassoon, four French horns, three B♭ trumpets, three trombones, tuba, timpani, percussion and strings.

A composer's note in the score instructs specific placement of the Latin American percussion instruments including bongo, claves, gourd, and maracas "right in front of the conductor's stand", with pictures.

F. Campbell Watson, who was in charge of Gershwin's scores after his death, had the score tweaked and changed somewhat. This may account for a rhythm piano that appears in some audio recordings.

== Preservation status ==
On September 22, 2013, it was announced that a musicological critical edition of the full orchestral score will be eventually released. The Gershwin family, working in conjunction with the Library of Congress and the University of Michigan, are working to make scores available to the public that represent Gershwin's true intent..
