= Short Story (Gershwin) =

Short Story is a piece for violin and piano composed by George Gershwin in 1925.

Gershwin composed the duet from two other short works that premiered at the same time as his Three Preludes. He combined a section of the Novelette in Fourths and another slower work (the forgotten Rubato prelude) to create this piece.

The 1940s two-piano, four-hands arrangement by the duo-pianists Al and Lee Reiser was published by Associated Music Publishers.
