= Hoctor's Ballet =

Composition by George Gershwin

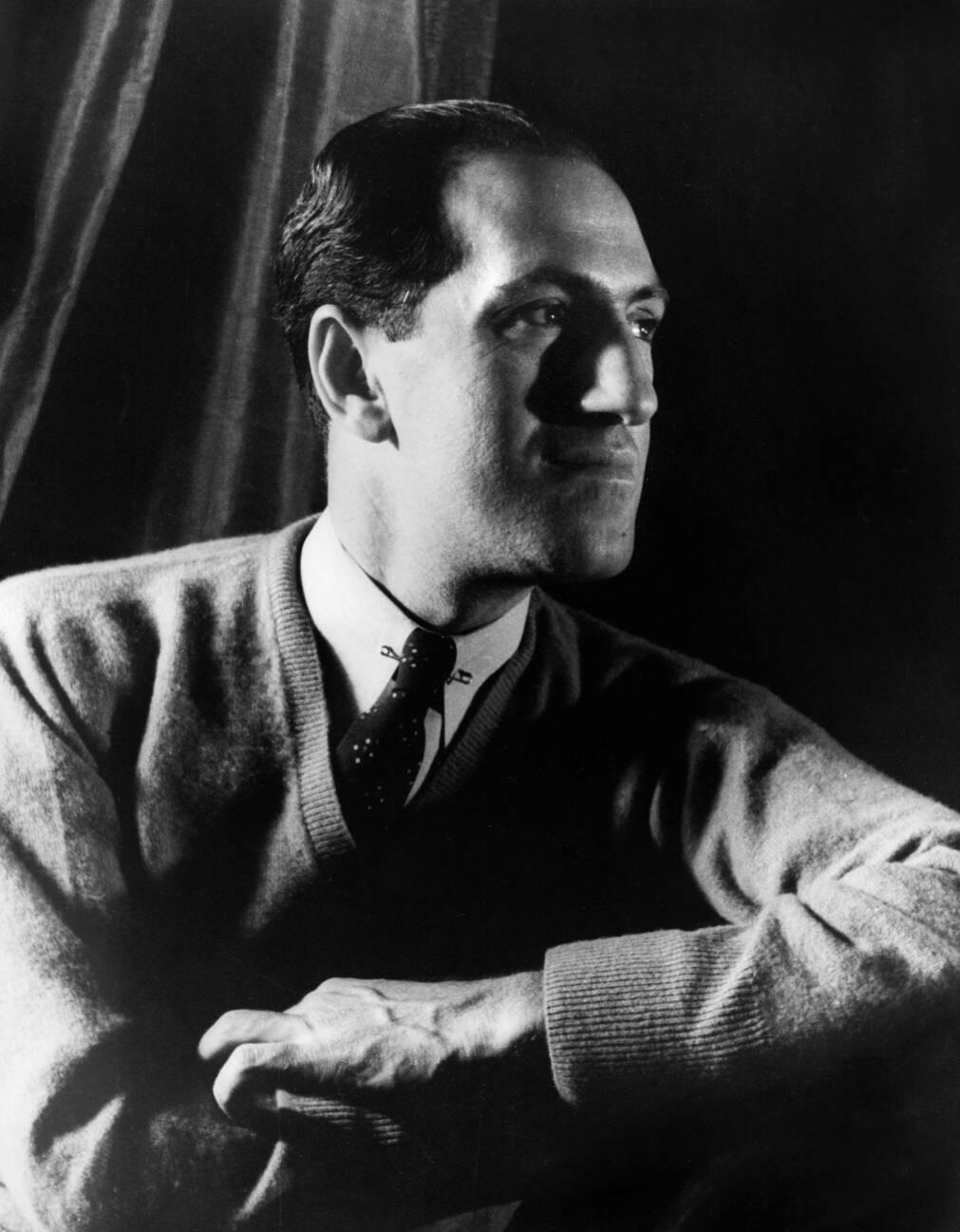
George Gershwin in 1937

Hoctor's Ballet is a composition by George Gershwin for full orchestra written in 1937, originally from the score for Shall We Dance.

Composed by Gershwin specifically for the ballerina Harriet Hoctor, the 10-minute piece features string glissandos, rapid shifts in key, and the most extensive parts are written for the harp. It consists of a dramatic introduction followed by a fast waltz, a stately procession, an extended pas de deux, and a climactic reprise (also noted in some books as a separate "Shall We Dance", "Masks" or "Finale and Coda" scene.)

This is the only published music from the Shall We Dance score available besides the Walking the Dog sequence, and is significant as the last long composition written by Gershwin for the symphony orchestra.

The premiere live concert performance of Hoctor's Ballet took place on July 28, 2007 at the Severance Hall Pavilion in Cleveland, Ohio, with Loras John Schissel conducting the Blossom Festival Orchestra.

== Preservation status ==
On September 22, 2013 it was announced that a musicological critical edition of the full orchestral score will be eventually released. The Gershwin family, working in conjunction with the Library of Congress and the University of Michigan, are working to make scores available to the public that represent Gershwin's true intent. The entire Gershwin project may take 30 to 40 years to complete, and it is unclear when the score to Shall We Dance (which includes Hoctor's Ballet) will be released.

* See specifically Gershwin: A New Critical Biography, by Edward Jablonski (1998) pg. 300-304 and Gershwin: His Life and Work, by Howard Pollack (2006) pg. 671 for specific discussions on the genesis of this piece.
