= Blossom Festival =

Annual music festival in Ohio

Coordinates: 41°11′29″N 81°33′38″W

The Blossom Festival is a summer music festival of orchestral music located at the Blossom Music Center in Cuyahoga Falls, Ohio. The festival was originally created to provide a summer concert vehicle for the Cleveland Orchestra and the Blossom Music Center was specifically built to host the festival. The festival's first season was in 1968 and it consisted of six weeks of concerts given by the Cleveland Orchestra intermingled with eight individual jazz/folk music concerts. George Szell conducted the first concert on July 19, 1968. Since then the festival has been expanded to include ten weeks of orchestral music, most of which is still performed by the Cleveland Orchestra but also includes concerts by the festival's own Blossom Festival Orchestra. The Blossom Festival Orchestra is made up of free-lance musicians from the Cleveland area, mostly pulling from musicians of the Cleveland Pops Orchestra, Opera Cleveland Orchestra, or Apollo's Fire. The orchestra performs annually for the Blossom Festival, often appearing when the Cleveland Orchestra has other summer performance engagements outside of the Cleveland area.

On July 28, 2007 the Blossom Festival made history; premiering the first live concert performance of Hoctor's Ballet which is one of the last orchestral works by Gershwin.

Until 2005, the Blossom Festival had its own music director. The last person to serve in that capacity was Jahja Ling. After he stepped down from that position, the orchestra eliminated the post, and now the orchestra's full-time music director Franz Welser-Möst is in charge of the classical music concerts both during the regular concert season in Cleveland and the summer concerts at the Blossom Festival. Leonard Slatkin was the Festival Director from 1992 through 1999.

2020 saw no festival happening.
