= Will Vodery =

American composer and conductor

- Vodery c. 1923
- Born: William Henry Bennett Vodery; October 8, 1885; Philadelphia, Pennsylvania
- Died: November 18, 1951 (aged 66); Farmingdale, New York
- Resting place: Long Island National Cemetery
- Occupations: Composer, conductor

Will Vodery (October 8, 1885 – November 18, 1951) was an American composer, conductor, orchestrator, and arranger, and one of the few black Americans of his time to make a name for himself as a composer on Broadway, working largely for Florenz Ziegfeld. He had offices at the Gaiety Theatre office building in Times Square.

== Personal life ==
William Henry Bennett Vodery was born in Philadelphia, Pennsylvania, on October 8, 1885; his mother Sarah J. Vodery was a pianist and his father was a teacher at Lincoln University. From an early age Vodery's family rented rooms to theatrical performers, exposing Will to many talented black performers at the turn of the 20th century, including members of the Williams & Walker Co. He attended the University of Pennsylvania on scholarship, where he studied with Hugh A. Clark. His mother made her home Frederick Douglass's Baltimore headquarters when he was visiting the city. Vodery served with the 807th Pioneer Infantry Regiment during World War II.

== Career ==
Beginning in 1910 Vodery served as the musical director for performances at the Howard Theater in Washington, D.C., until 1911. During this time, he co-wrote music and lyrics for J. Leubrie Hill's My Friend from Dixie. This show was subsequently revised and expanded into the Darktown Follies. Darktown Follies became one of the landmark shows at the Lafayette Theater in Harlem.

While Vodery did compose the music for the show From Dixie to Broadway (1924), he is most famous for the vocal and choral arrangements that he created for the original Broadway stage production of the classic musical Show Boat (1927). His arrangements for the show were used again in the London production of the show (1928), and the first revival on Broadway (1932), as well as in both the Universal Pictures film version (1936), and the prologue to the part-talkie 1929 film version (also by Universal) of Edna Ferber's novel, on which the show is based. Vodery's original arrangements were combined with new ones by Pembroke Davenport for the 1946 Broadway revival of Show Boat.

Vodery also created the vocal arrangements for several editions of the Ziegfeld Follies. He also orchestrated George Gershwin's one-act opera Blue Monday and assisted with Gershwin's Concerto in F. With Will Marion Cook, he wrote the show Swing Along (1929).

Vodery was an important influence on Duke Ellington. Also in 1929, Vodery, in his capacity as Ziegfeld's musical supervisor, recommended Ellington for Show Girl. According to author John Hasse, "Perhaps during the run of Show Girl, Ellington received what he later termed 'valuable lessons in orchestration from Will Vodery.'" Author Barry Ulanov wrote of this relationship: "From Vodery, as he (Ellington) says himself, he drew his chromatic convictions, his uses of the tones ordinarily extraneous to the diatonic scale, with the consequent alteration of the harmonic character of his music, its broadening, The deepening of his resources. It has become customary to ascribe the classical influences upon Duke – Delius, Debussy and Ravel – to direct contact with their music. Actually his serious appreciation of those and other modern composers, came after his meeting with Vodery."

From 1929 to 1932 Vodery was arranger and musical director for Fox Films in Hollywood. Following his time at Fox, Vodery moved back to New York City, where he continued to arrange music for such shows as Shuffle Along of 1933 and several editions of Leonard Harper's revues at the Cotton Club, a cultural landmark located in Harlem. In 1942 he was musical director for Ed Sullivan's Harlem Cavalcade.

Despite his success and popularity at the time, Vodery is largely unknown today, partly because he received no screen credit in the 1936 film version of Show Boat, and partly because some modern productions of the show do not use his arrangements. He died on November 18, 1951, in Farmingdale, New York, only four months after Metro-Goldwyn-Mayer's 1951 Technicolor film version of Show Boat, on which he did not work, had been released.

== Compositions and arrangements ==
- Carolina Fox Trot (1914), for solo piano
- Blue Monday (1922), opera by George Gershwin, orchestrations by Will Vodery in consultation with the composer
- From Dixie to Broadway (1924), musical, all music and orchestrations by the composer
- Waikiki Is Calling Me (1924), waltz for piano
- Ziegfeld Follies (1924-1937), arranger and orchestrator for Fox Film Corporation
- Blackbirds (1924–1938), musical revues, arranger and orchestrator
- Show Boat (1927), arranger and orchestrator
- Keep Shufflin' (1928), arranger and orchestrator
- Swing Along (1929), co-composer with Will Marion Cook, also arranger and orchestrator
- Such Men Are Dangerous (1930), orchestrator
- Hills of Old New Hampshire (1933), song
- The Darktown Poker Club (1946), musical interlude, all music and orchestrations

== Sources ==
- Will Vodery at IMDb
- Will Vodery at the Internet Broadway Database
- Miles Kreuger, Show Boat: The History of a Classic American Musical. ISBN 0-306-80401-8
