= Harriet Hoctor =

American ballerina and actress

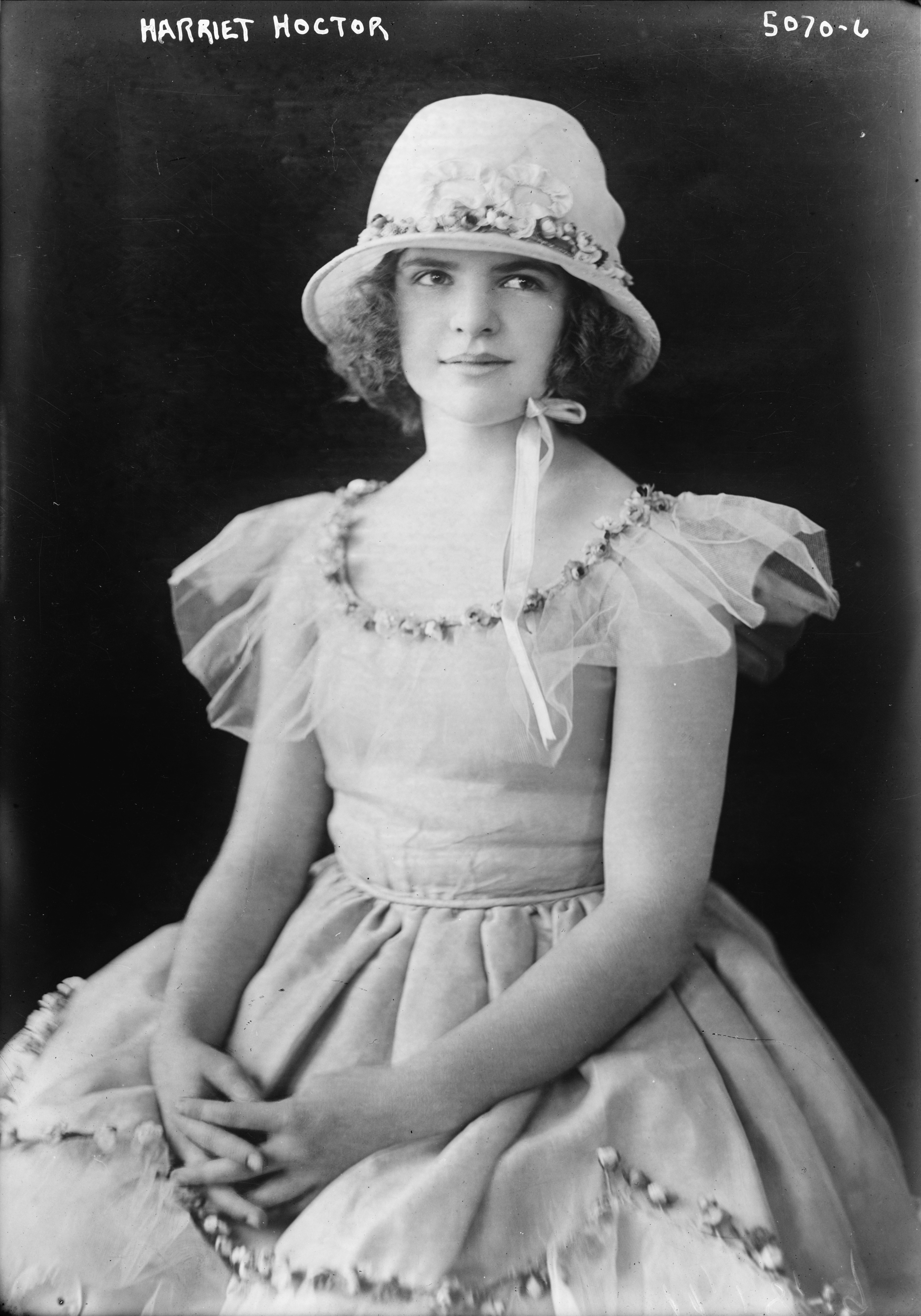
- Born: September 25, 1905; Hoosick Falls, New York, U.S.
- Died: June 9, 1977 (aged 71); Arlington, Virginia, U.S.
- Resting place: St. Mary's Cemetery, Hoosick Falls, New York
- Years active: 1936–1937 (actress)

Harriet Hoctor (September 25, 1905 – June 9, 1977) was a ballerina and actress. Composer George Gershwin composed a symphonic orchestral piece ("Hoctor's Ballet") specifically for Hoctor in the film Shall We Dance (1937).

== Life and career ==
Harriet Hoctor was born in Hoosick Falls, New York, to Timothy Hoctor and Elizabeth Kearny Hoctor. She was one of four children, the others being Martin Francis ("Frank"), John, and Eloise. Harriet Hoctor never married.

=== Early training ===
Hoctor's maternal aunt, Annie Kearney, was a social secretary to a wealthy woman in Hoosick Falls who took an interest in young Harriet. At the age of twelve she was sent to New York City and placed under the tutelage of Russian ballet master Louis Harvy Chalif of the Normal School of Dancing.

=== Stage ===
By the time she was sixteen, Hoctor was touring in vaudeville on the same bill as the Duncan Sisters. She was asked to join their act and became a key player in their Topsy and Eva show presented on Broadway. Hoctor appeared in a doll ballet and was informed that Florenz Ziegfeld was offering her a trial part in his production of The Three Musketeers (1928). By 1929, she was given the first opportunity to dance during a ballet staging of George Gershwin's An American in Paris.

From 1931 to 1932, she danced in London, at the London Hippodrome, tapping up and down an escalator en pointe in a production called "Bow Bells." While she was there, the English sculptor Jacob Epstein sculpted her in bronze. Upon her return to the United States, she appeared in the Vanities revue of Earl Carroll in 1932, and later in the decade in the Ziegfeld Follies, notably in a ballet arranged by Hoctor with the aid of George Balanchine titled "Night Flight" about the ghost of a young aviator: "A young girl, flying cross-country in pursuance of a non-stop record, crashes and is killed. Out of the wreckage rises the soul of the plane fused with that of the young girl."

=== Film ===
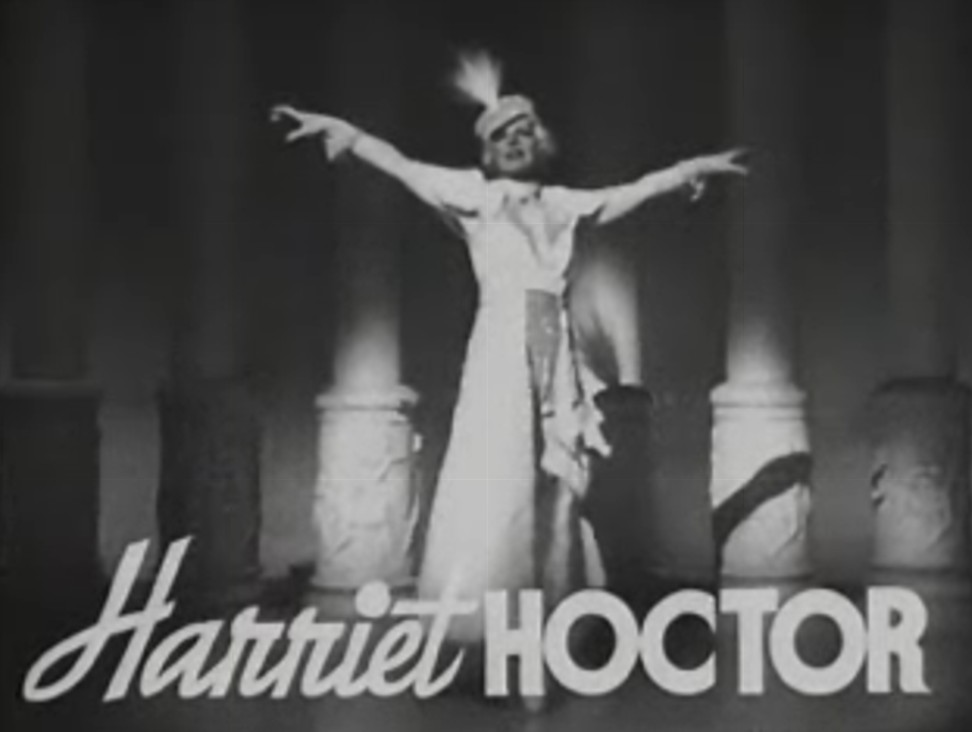
Harriet Hoctor as herself from the trailer for The Great Ziegfeld (1936)

In the late 1930s, she was a dancer in a number of Hollywood movies. She appeared as herself in The Great Ziegfeld (1936), Shall We Dance (1937), and Billy Rose's Casa Manana Revue (1938). Shall We Dance featured Fred Astaire and Ginger Rogers, and Hoctor danced with Astaire. Hoctor missed at least two chances to star in major Hollywood movies with Fred Astaire. In 1935, Hollywood gossip queen Louella Parsons reported that Astaire and Rogers were splitting up and that Hoctor would take the role in Shall We Dance meant for Rogers, but Rogers decided to take the part after all. However, Hoctor was consoled for the loss with "Hoctor's Ballet", which appears at the end of the film. Two years later, in 1937, The New York Times announced Hoctor as the lead in the planned Astaire movie A Damsel in Distress, but Joan Fontaine eventually claimed the part.

=== Teaching ===
In the early 1940s, Hoctor taught ballet three days a week in a school that she opened in Boston.

=== Death ===
Harriet Hoctor died in Arlington, Virginia, at the Northern Virginia Doctor's Hospital, in 1977, aged 71. Her death came after an extended illness. She was buried in St. Mary's Cemetery in her native Hoosick Falls following a Mass of Christian Burial at the Church of the Immaculate Conception.

== Legacy ==
The summer she died, playwright Frank Wirmusky cast This Is Your Life, Hoosick Falls. The play transformed one hundred and fifty years of the town's history into an hour-long theatrical performance. Actors depicted twelve Hoosick Falls men and women from the past who made important contributions in various endeavors. One of those portrayed was Hoctor. Actress Kelly Thompson donned beads prior to appearing on stage as Hoctor, looking like a 1920s era flapper.

== Filmography ==
| Year | Title | Role | Notes |
|---|---|---|---|
| 1936 | The Great Ziegfeld | Herself - Dancer | |

| Year | Title | Role | Notes |
|---|---|---|---|
| 1937 | Shall We Dance | Herself - Dancer | |
