= Let's Call the Whole Thing Off =

1937 song by George and Ira Gershwin

Song by Fred Astaire
- B-side: "Shall We Dance"
- Published: February 27, 1937 by Gershwin Publishing Corp., New York
- Released: April 3, 1937
- Recorded: March 3, 1937
- Studio: Los Angeles, California
- Genre: Jazz, pop vocal
- Label: Brunswick 7857
- Composer: George Gershwin
- Lyricist: Ira Gershwin

Fred Astaire singles chronology
"They All Laughed" (1937)	"Let's Call the Whole Thing Off" (1937)	"A Foggy Day" (1938)

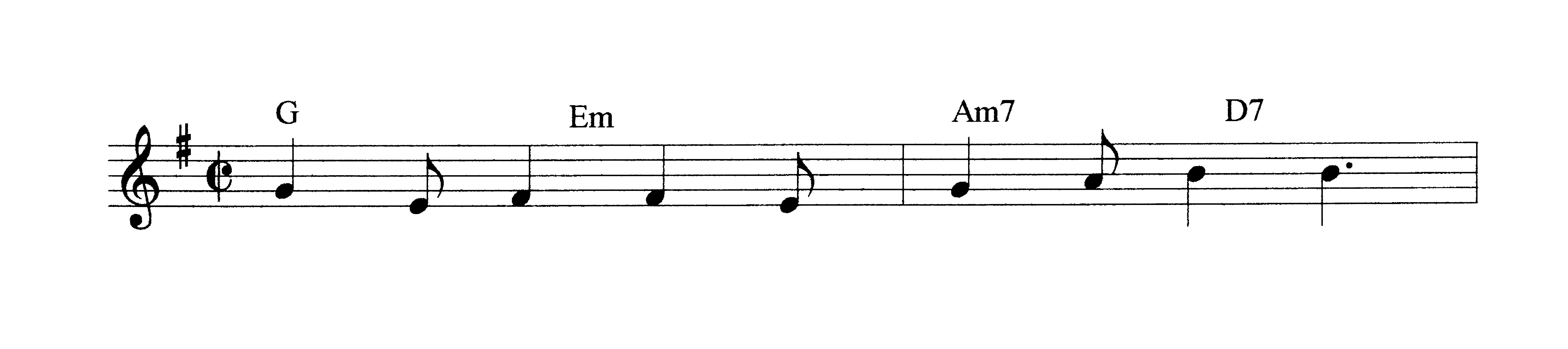
The first four bars of "Let's Call the Whole Thing Off"

"Let's Call the Whole Thing Off" is a song written by George Gershwin and Ira Gershwin for the 1937 film Shall We Dance, where it was introduced by Fred Astaire and Ginger Rogers as part of a celebrated dance duet on roller skates. The sheet music has the tempo marking of "Brightly". The song was ranked No. 34 on AFI's 100 Years...100 Songs.

== Background ==
The song is most famous for its "You like to-may-to /təˈmeɪtə/ / And I like to-mah-to /təˈmɑːtə/" and other verses comparing British and American English pronunciations of tomato and other words.

In addition to being regional, the differences in pronunciation serve more specifically to identify class differences. At the time, typical American pronunciations were considered less "refined" by the upper-class, and there was a specific emphasis on the "broader" a sound. This class distinction with respect to pronunciation has been retained in caricatures, especially in the theater, where the longer a pronunciation is most strongly associated with the word darling.

== Recordings ==
- Fred Astaire with Johnny Green & His Orchestra (1937)
- Shep Fields and his Riplling Rhythm Orchestra with vocalist Bobby Goday (1937)
- Billie Holiday – on Lady Day: The Complete Billie Holiday on Columbia 1933–1944 (1937), or on The Quintessential Billie Holiday, Vol. 4 (1937)
- Sam Cooke – Tribute to the Lady (1959)
- Ella Fitzgerald – on Ella Fitzgerald Sings the George and Ira Gershwin Songbook (1959), on the 1983 Pablo release Nice Work If You Can Get It, and in a 1957 duet with Louis Armstrong on Ella and Louis Again.
- Bing Crosby and Rosemary Clooney recorded the song for their radio show in 1960 and it was subsequently released on the CD Bing & Rosie - The Crosby-Clooney Radio Sessions (2010).
- Harry Connick Jr. for the soundtrack for When Harry Met Sally (1989)
- Uri Caine – Rhapsody in Blue (2013)
- Willie Nelson with Cyndi Lauper on Summertime: Willie Nelson Sings Gershwin (2016)

== Popular culture ==
- The song has been re-used in filmmaking and television production, most notably in When Harry Met Sally... – where it is performed by Louis Armstrong – and The Simpsons.
- In the February 18, 1970, Anne Bancroft television special, "Annie: The Women in the Life of a Man," Bancroft appears in a comedy sketch with David Susskind in which she plays a hapless singer in an audition who sings the song from sheet music, cluelessly ignoring the different pronunciation of to-may-to and to-mah-to, etc. Ira Gershwin relates a similar incident in his 1959 book. An essentially similar sketch was performed by comedians John Bird and John Fortune in the 1976 Amnesty International benefit concert A Poke in the Eye (With a Sharp Stick).
- The tune was also featured in the 2012 Broadway Musical Nice Work If You Can Get It.
- In the 2021 film Venom: Let There Be Carnage, Venom sings the song while it is playing on the radio.
- In The Muppet Show episode #350, Sylvester Stallone sings a modified version of the song while dressed as a Roman gladiator and battling a dancing lion.
- The song was used as the theme from the 1990 ITV sitcom Freddie and Max, produced by Thames Television, and performed by the show's stars Anne Bancroft and Charlotte Coleman.

== Full list of differences ==
Comparisons made in the song
Phrase/word	"You"	"I"
this and...	the other	that
either	/ˈiːðər/	/ˈaɪðər/
neither	/ˈniːðər/	/ˈnaɪðər/
potato	/pəˈteɪtə/	/pəˈtɑːtə/
tomato	/təˈmeɪtə/	/təˈmɑːtə/
pajamas	/pəˈdʒæməz/	/pəˈdʒɑːməz/
laughter	/ˈlæftər/	/ˈlɑːftər/
after	/ˈæftər/	/ˈɑːftər/
Havana	/həˈvænə/	/həˈvɑːnə/
banana	/bəˈnænə/	/bəˈnɑːnə/
oysters	/ˈɔɪstərz/	/ˈɜːrstərz/
