= They All Laughed (song) =

1937 song by George and Ira Gershwin

Song by Fred Astaire
- B-side: "Slap That Bass"
- Published: February 27, 1937 by Gershwin Publishing Corp., New York
- Released: 1937
- Recorded: March 18, 1937
- Studio: Los Angeles, California
- Genre: Jazz, pop
- Label: Brunswick
- Composer: George Gershwin
- Lyricist: Ira Gershwin

Fred Astaire singles chronology
"They Can't Take That Away from Me" (1937)	"They All Laughed" (1937)	"Let's Call the Whole Thing Off" (1937)

"They All Laughed" is a song composed by George Gershwin, with lyrics by Ira Gershwin, written for the 1937 film Shall We Dance where it was introduced by Ginger Rogers as part of a song and dance routine with Fred Astaire.

== Lyrics ==
The lyrics compare those who "laughed at me, wanting you" with those who laughed at some of history's famous scientific and industrial pioneers, asking, "Who's got the last laugh now?" People and advances mentioned are Christopher Columbus's proof the Earth is round; Thomas Edison's phonograph; Guglielmo Marconi's wireless telegraphy; the Wright brothers's first flight; the Rockefeller Center; Eli Whitney's cotton gin; Robert Fulton's North River Steamboat; Milton S. Hershey's Hershey bar chocolate; and Henry Ford's "Tin Lizzy" Model T car.

== Recording and releases ==
Fred Astaire with Johnny Green and His Orchestra recorded the song on March 18, 1937. Brunswick Records released it as a single, which appeared on the U.S. record charts. Astaire recorded the song again in 1952 for his album The Astaire Story and again in 1975 for the album The Golden Age Of Fred Astaire.

A version by Frank Sinatra appears on his triple album Trilogy: Past Present Future (1980), in the "Past" section.
