= Three Preludes (Gershwin) =

Piano compositions by George Gershwin

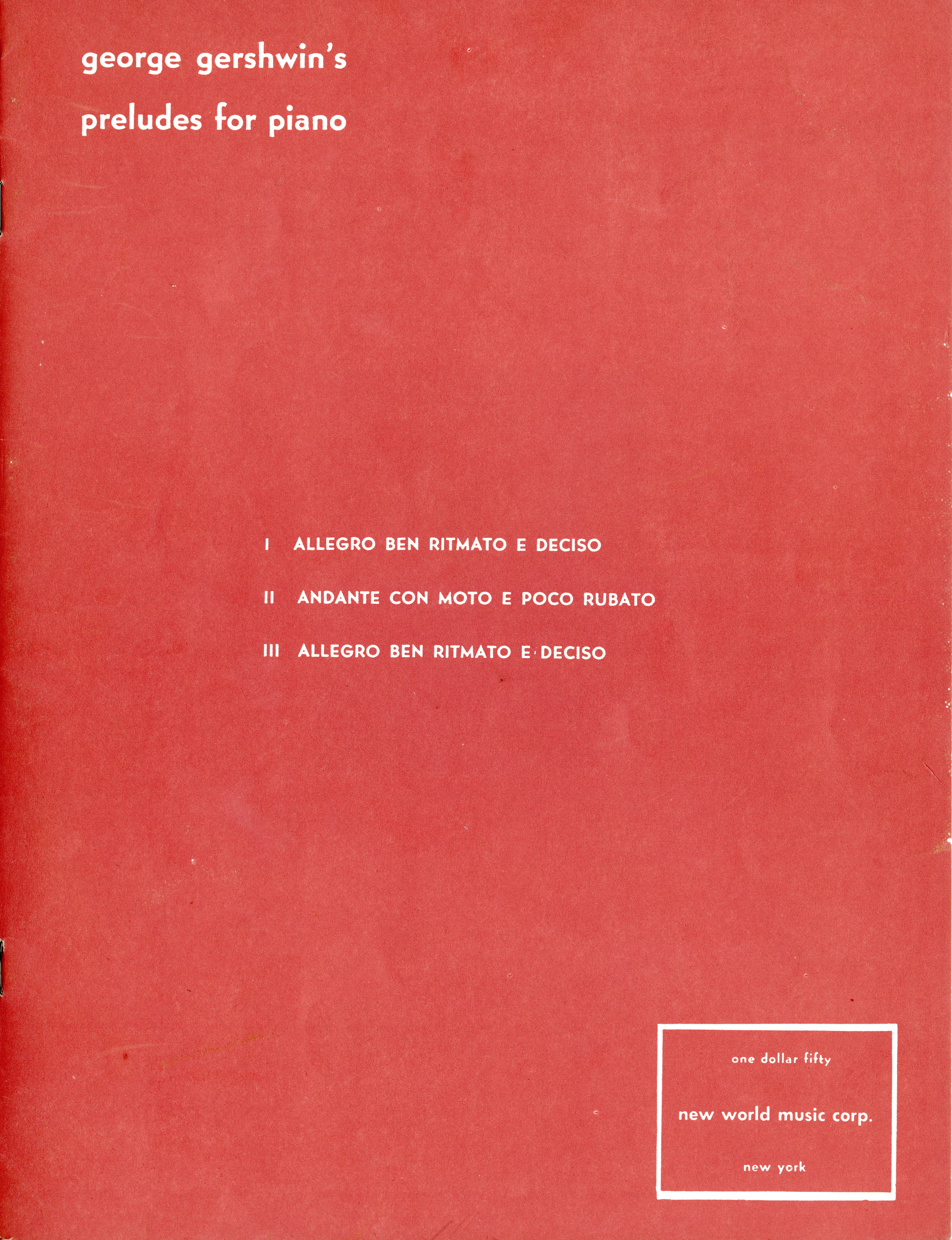
Sheet music cover

Three Preludes is a collection of short piano pieces by George Gershwin, which were first performed by the composer at the Roosevelt Hotel in New York City in 1926. Each prelude is a well-known example of early-20th-century American classical music, as influenced by jazz. The three pieces, when played together consecutively, typically run about a total of five minutes.

Gershwin originally planned to compose 24 preludes called The Melting Pot for this group of works. The number was reduced to seven in manuscript form, and then reduced to six in public performance, and further decreased to three when first published in 1926. Two of the remaining preludes not published were rearranged for solo violin and piano and published as Short Story. Of the other two, the Prelude in G was eliminated by the publisher because somewhat similar music had already appeared in Gershwin's Concerto in F. The other was excluded for unknown reasons.

Gershwin dedicated his Preludes to friend and musical advisor Bill Daly.

The pieces have been arranged for solo instruments, small ensembles, and piano.

Mark Morris choreographed a version for solo dancer, premiered by Morris himself in June, 1992, as part of Mark Morris Dance Group performances in Boston. The work was performed later that month by Mikhail Baryshnikov as a guest artist with the New York City Ballet.

== Pieces ==
=== 1. Allegro ben ritmato e deciso ===
1. Allegro ben ritmato e deciso
Played by María Cueva Méndez

The first prelude, in B♭ major, begins with a five-note blues motif; virtually all the melodic material in the piece is based on this theme. Syncopated rhythms based on the Brazilian baião and chords containing flattened sevenths occur throughout; these give the piece a strong jazz feel. Although these sounds are far from adventurous by modern standards, to the audiences of the late 1920s they were almost unheard of. Structurally, the piece is in ternary form; however, the impression on the listener is that of a fantasia. This effect is achieved by using snippets of various virtuoso techniques, such as repeated notes, octaves, scales, and crossed hands, each of which is used for only a moment before the piece catches a flicker of some new idea.

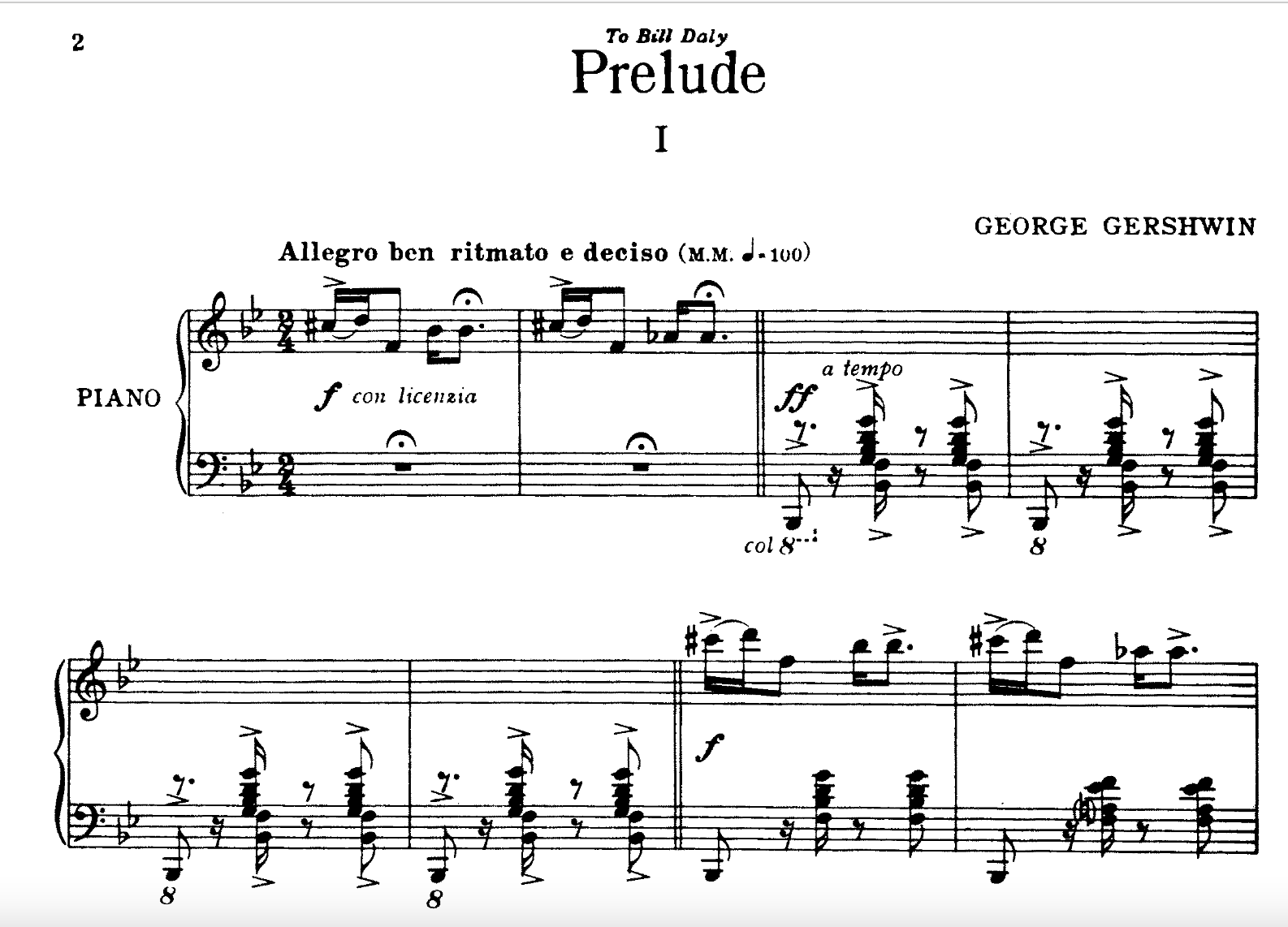
Opening bars of the first prelude

=== 2. Andante con moto (not as published in 1927) ===
The second prelude, in C♯ minor, also has the distinct flavour of jazz. The piece begins with a subdued melody winding its way above a smooth, steady bassline. The harmonies and melodies of this piece are built on thirds, emphasizing both the interval of the seventh and the major/minor duality of the blues scale. In the second section, the key, tempo, and thematic material all change; only the similarity of style binds the two sections together. The opening melody and bass return in the final section, more succinct but otherwise unchanged, and the piece ends with a slow ascent of the keyboard. Gershwin himself referred to the piece as "a sort of blues lullaby."

=== 3. Agitato (as marked in the manuscript, not as published) ===
Gershwin himself called this prelude in E♭ minor "Spanish", but modern ears may find the description puzzling. After a brief and dramatic introduction, the main theme is revealed: two melodies that together form a question-and-answer pair. This theme is used throughout to provide harmonic structure. The "question" is harmonized using E♭ minor chords, the "answer" by E♭ major chords. After a brief, highly syncopated middle section, the melodic pair returns assertively in octaves, causing a battle between major and minor. Major wins, and the piece concludes with an arpeggio.
