= Historical editions (music) =

Category of printed music

Historical editions form part of a category of printed music, which generally consists of classical music and opera from a past repertory, where the term can apply to several different types of published music. However, it is principally applied to one of three types of music of this sort:

- Scholarly or critical editions are music editions in which careful scholarship has been employed to ensure that the music contained within is as close to the composer's original intentions as possible. Such editions are sometimes called urtext editions.
- Collected Works or Complete Works, generally in multi-volume sets, are devoted to a particular composer or to a particular musical repertory. This is sometimes referred to in German as Gesamtausgabe when containing the works of one particular composer.
- Monuments or Monumental Editions (or the German Denkmäler) when containing a repertory defined by geography, time period, or musical genre.

== The origins of historical editions ==
Up until the 18th century, music performance and distribution centered around current compositions. Even professional musicians rarely were familiar with music written more than a half century before their own time. In the second half of the 18th century, an awakening of interest in the history of music prompted the publication of numerous collections of older music (for example, William Boyce's Cathedral Music, published around 1760-63, and Giovanni Battista Martini's Esemplare, ossia Saggio... di contrappunto, published around 1774-5). Around the same time, the proliferation of pirated editions of music by popular composers (such as Haydn and Mozart) prompted respected music publishers to embark on "oeuvres complètes," intended as uniform editions of the entire musical output of these composers. Unfortunately, many of these early complete works projects were never finished.

In the 19th century, the emergence of romantic hero worship of composers, sometimes described as the "cult of genius," fired the enthusiasm for Complete Works series for important composers. The development of the academic field of musicology also contributed to an interest in more accurate and well-researched editions of musical works. Finally, the rise of Nationalism within music circles influenced the creation of Monumental Editions devoted to geographical regions, such as Denkmäler deutscher Tonkunst begun in 1892 and Denkmäler der Tonkunst in Österreich begun in 1894.

== Editing historical editions ==
In creating a scholarly or critical edition, an editor examines all available versions of the given piece (early musical sketches, manuscript versions, publisher’s proof copies, early printed editions, and so on) and attempts to create an edition that is as close to the composer’s original intentions as possible. Editors use their historical knowledge, analytical skills, and musical understanding to choose what one hopes is the most accurate version of the piece. More recent scholarly editions often include footnotes or critical reports describing discrepancies between differing versions, or explaining appropriate performance practice for the time period. In general, editing music is a much more challenging endeavor than editing text-based works of literature, as musical notation can be imprecise, musical handwriting can be difficult to decipher, and first or early printed editions of pieces often contained mistakes.

By comparison, what are known as performers’ editions do not rely on a thorough examination of all known sources, and often purposely include extraneous markings not written by the composer (dynamics, articulation marks, bowing indications, fingerings, and so on) to aid a musician playing from that score.

== Scholarly or critical editions ==
=== Opera ===
For information on critical editions of operatic works, see critical edition (opera)

== Collected Works or Complete Works ==
The German music publisher Breitkopf & Härtel initiated many of the earliest complete works series of major composers. A few of these include:

- Johann Sebastian Bach: Werke (1851-1900; supplemental volume [revised edition of The Art of Fugue] 1926)
- George Frideric Handel: Werke (1858-1902)
- Giovanni Pierluigi da Palestrina: Werke (1862-1907)
- Ludwig van Beethoven: Werke (1862–65, supplemental volume 1888)
- Felix Mendelssohn-Bartholdy: Werke (1874-1877)
- Wolfgang Amadeus Mozart: Werke (1877-1883, supplements until 1910)

Many of these early complete works series were edited by music scholars or composers famous in their own right, such as Johannes Brahms, Guido Adler, Julius Rietz, Friedrich Chrysander, and others.

After the upheavals of World War I and World War II, which slowed the output of musical scholarship and publishing, renewed activity led to many new series as well as to a reassessment of the older complete works series. New techniques in photographic and other types of reproduction allowed scholars to consult many more early sources, either in microfilm or facsimile copies. Entirely new series were published for several major composers for whom complete works sets already existed. These updated editions incorporated new scholarship in their editing and allowed for a broader definition of complete works, often including early versions of pieces, sketches, and so on. Many of these new series have been published by the German music publisher Bärenreiter, and include:

- Bach: Neue Bach-Ausgabe (1954-)
- Handel: Hallische Händel-Ausgabe (1955-)
- Mozart: Neue Mozart-Ausgabe (1955-)

In addition to the reworking of older Complete Works series, many new series have been initiated for composers not previously featured in this way. Some examples include:

- Leoš Janáček: Complete Critical Edition (1978-)
- Edward Elgar: Elgar Complete Edition (1981-)
- Alban Berg: Sämtliche Werke (1984-)
- Carl Nielsen: Edition (1993-2009)
- Claude Debussy: Oeuvres complètes (1985-)
- Carl Philipp Emanuel Bach: The Complete Works (2005-)
- Johann Christian Bach: Collected Works (1984–99)

It would be impossible to list here all of the new Complete Works series that have been initiated in the last century. Some of the major publishers of these series include Breitkopf & Härtel, Bärenreiter, Stainer & Bell, and G. Henle Verlag.

== Monuments or Monumental Editions ==
Many of the early Monumental Editions were devoted to geographic regions, and often had the support of their respective governments. For example, the series Denkmäler deutscher Tonkunst, begun in 1892 by a group of German musicians that included Johannes Brahms, Joseph Joachim, and Philipp Spitta, was supported by the German government. Examples of other monumental editions (still ongoing) include:

- Samfundet til udgivelse af dansk musik (1872-)
- Denkmäler der Tonkunst in Österreich (1894-)
- Monumenta Musicae Belgicae (1932-)
- Music of the United States of America (1988-)

Some recent projects include not only those focusing on geographic regions, but also many devoted to particular time periods or repertory, such as:

- Monumenta Musicae Byzantinae (1935-)
- Polyphonic Music of the Fourteenth Century (1956–58)
- Recent Researches in Music (1962-)
- Italian Opera, 1640-1770 (1977-)

It would be impossible to list all of the Monumental Editions currently ongoing. Several of the major publishers of these series include the American Institute of Musicology, A-R Editions, Bärenreiter, Istituto Italiano per la Storia della Musica, Instituto Español de musicologia, Éditions de l'Oiseau-Lyre, and others.

=== Characteristics of complete works and monumental editions ===
Publication of these multi-volume series is usually spread over many years, sometimes decades. Depending on the financial state of the publisher, some projected sets are never finished, and some sets are taken over by other publishers. There are often different editors for individual volumes, with a general editor or committee of editors to oversee the entire series. Complete Works series are often organized by genre, for example grouping all symphonies together, or all piano sonatas. Several of the complete works sets have complicated, multi-tiered systems for numbering the volumes. Monumental Editions have varying organizational schemes, but several of them include numerous sub-series, some of which are devoted to the music of single composers.

These publications are often sponsored by musicological research bodies or by civic organizations. Many of these endeavors also value international cooperation, creating editorial boards that include scholars from various countries.

== Finding pieces within historical edition sets ==
Finding a particular piece of music within one of these multi-volume sets can often be difficult, as many of the series do not have general indices. For pieces within a composer's complete works set, researchers often consult the New Grove Dictionary of Music and Musicians (Second Edition, 2001), either online or in its printed version. Articles on composers will list the title and publisher of any complete works sets that exist, and within the list of compositions by that composer, will include volume numbers of the complete works set in which each piece is found.

To find pieces within older Monumental Editions, the best resource is still the 3rd edition of Anna Harriet Heyer's Historical Sets, Collected Editions, and Monuments of Music: A Guide to their Content, published in 1980. A more up to date description of newer complete works and monumental edition sets can be found in the work of George Hill and Norris Stephens, but there is no index to find individual pieces. An online database, called the "Index to Printed Music: Collections & Series," is currently underway, but it is accessible by subscription only, and is not yet complete.
