= Barry (name) =

Barry is both a given name and an Irish and West African surname. The given name can be an Anglicised form of some Irish personal names or shortened form of Barrington or Finbarr, while the surname has numerous etymological origins, and is derived from both place names and personal names.

== Etymology ==
=== Of given name ===
The given name Barry is derived from Gaelic, possibly being an Anglicised form of the personal name Báire, which is a short form of the related Irish names Bairrfhionn or Barrfind ("fair-headed", "fair-haired"), and Finbar or Fionnbharr ("fair-topped", "fair-haired").

For example, Barry is sometimes derived from the Irish Bairre, Barra, and Barre, which are in turn forms of the name Barrfind. Furthermore, Barry is sometimes an Anglicised form of the Irish Finnbarr, which also has short forms of Bairre, Barra, and Barre. Similarly, Barry is sometimes an Anglicised form of the latter short form Barra. In other cases, Barry is an Anglicised form of the Irish Berach ("pointed", "spear", "sharp").

Since the twentieth century, the name has become very popular in Australia. A variant form of the given name is Barrie. In the Netherlands the form Berry is also used. Pet forms of the name are Baz and Bazza.

As a given name, Barry is currently less common than it once was. It rose in popularity in the United States during the 1930s and 1940s, and was in the top 100 names through the 1970s. In recent years, the name has not even made the US top 1000 list of names (the last time was in 2004, when it ranked 963). Barry's highest rank was 61, which was achieved in 1962.

US President Barack Obama was called by the nickname Barry when younger, which he eventually halted.

Barry as a given name may also be from the surname, as with Barry Yelverton, 1st Viscount Avonmore, whose mother's maiden name was Barry.

=== Of surname ===
The surname Barry has numerous origins.

In some cases, the surname Barry is an Anglicised form of the Irish Ó Beargha, meaning "descendant of Beargh". The byname Beargh means "plunderer" or "spear-like". In other cases Barry is an Anglicisation of the Irish Ó Báire, meaning "descendant of Báire". Alternatively, Barry is a patronymic form of the personal name Henry. In such cases, the name is partly derived from the Welsh ap Harry, as is the case of the similar surname Parry. In other cases, the surname Barry is derived from a place name, sometimes seemingly of Continental origin, and sometimes from a British place name, such as Barry, Angus in Scotland.

The surname Barry, when originating in Ireland, is chiefly derived from the Cambro-Norman family of de Barry (from Barry, Vale of Glamorgan), who were prominent in the 12th-century Norman invasion of Ireland. In Irish, this family's name is rendered de Barra. In Ireland, the surname Barry occurs most commonly in Munster and south Leinster. The concentrations of the surname in County Limerick could correspond with the Ó Beargha origin of the name, while the concentration of the surname in West Cork could correspond with the Ó Báire origin.

There is a surname Barry, variant form of the rarer Barri, typical of the south of France, that means "rampart, city wall" and by extension "suburb", that is to say "somebody from the suburb or living near the rampart". Variant forms include Delbarry and Dubarry.

Barry is also a common surname among the Fula people in West Africa (Fula: 𞤄𞤢𞤪𞤭, romanized: Bari).

== Geographical distribution ==
As of 2014, 59.3% of all known bearers of the surname Barry were residents of Guinea (frequency 1:17), 14.7% of Burkina Faso (1:104), 5.4% of the United States (1:5,629), 4.5% of Senegal (1:274), 3.7% of Mali (1:384), 1.2% of England (1:3,951), 1.1% of Ireland (1:362) and 1.0% of Australia (1:2,004).

== People with the surname ==
- Barry (surname)

== People with Barry as a given name ==
Those for whom Barry is a hypocoristic for another given name are listed separately.

- Barry Alvarez (born 1946), American football coach and sports administrator
- Barry Asher (born 1946), American bowler
- Barry Atsma (born 1972), Dutch actor
- Barry Austin (1968–2021), heaviest man in the United Kingdom
- Barry Bannan (born 1989), Scottish footballer
- Barry K. Barnes (1906–1965), English stage and screen actor
- Barry Beckett (1943–2009), American musician
- Barry Bonds (born 1964), American baseball player
- Barry Bostwick (born 1945), American actor
- Barry Brickell (1935–2016), New Zealand potter, writer, conversationist and founder
- Barry Byrne (1883–1967), Irish guitarist and footballer
- Barry Chuckle (1944–2018), English comedian and half of the Chuckle Brothers double act
- Barry Cottle (born 1961/62), American businessman, CEO of Scientific Games Corporation
- Barry Crane (1927–1985), American television producer and bridge player
- Barry Cryer (1935–2022), British comedian
- Barry Davies (born 1937), BBC sports commentator
- Barry Derickson (born c. 1988), American college football coach for the Sul Ross Lobos
- Barry Diller (born 1942), American businessman
- Barry Evans (disambiguation)
- Barry Fantoni (1940–2025), British writer, painter and jazz musician
- Barry Ferguson (born 1978), footballer who formerly played for Scotland and Blackpool FC
- Barry Fitzgerald (1888–1961), Irish and American stage and motion picture actor
- Barry George (born 1960), British criminal
- Barry Gibb (born 1946), English singer and musician, member of the Bee Gees
- Barry Goldwater (1909–1998), American politician
- Barry Hall (born 1977), Australian rules footballer
- Barry Hawkins (born 1979), English snooker player
- Barry Hay (born 1948), Dutch singer
- Barry Hearn (born 1948), English sporting events promoter
- Barry Heneghan, Irish politician
- Barry L. Houser (born 1977), American band director and conductor, currently the director of the Marching Illini at the University of Illinois Urbana-Champaign
- Barry Humphries (1934–2023), Australian comedian
- Barry Jackson (director) (1879–1961), English theatre director and founder of the Birmingham Repertory
- Barry John (1945–2024), Welsh rugby union player
- Barry Jones (disambiguation)
- Barry Joule (born 1954/55), Canadian writer
- Barry Keoghan (born 1992), Irish actor
- Barry Kramer (1942–2025), American basketball player and jurist
- Barry Larkin (born 1964), American baseball player
- Barry Latman (1936–2019), American baseball player
- Barry Leibowitz (born 1945), American-Israeli basketball player
- Barry Levinson (born 1942), American film director
- Barry Lewis (cook) (born 1982), British YouTuber
- Barry Lewis (cricketer) (born 1952), English cricketer
- Barry Lopez (1945–2020), American author
- Barry MacKay (actor) (1906–1985), British stage and screen actor
- Barry Manilow (born 1943), American singer
- Barry McConnell (born 1977), English footballer
- Barry Melrose (1956–2026), Canadian hockey player/coach/commentator
- Barry Moreland (born 1943), Australian dancer and choreographer
- Barry Cennydd Morgan (born 1947), former Archbishop of Wales
- Barry C. Morgrage, American politician
- Barry Nadech (born 1991), Thai model and actor
- Barry Nelson (1917–2007), American actor
- Barry Newman (1930–2023), American actor
- Barry Norman (1933–2017), British film critic
- Barry O'Farrell (born 1959), Australian politician
- Barry Otto (born 1941), Australian actor
- Barry Padarath, Trinidad and Tobago politician
- Barry Paul (born 1948), British Olympic fencer
- Barry Pepper (born 1970), Canadian actor
- Barry Richards (born 1945) South African cricketer
- Barry Richardson (disambiguation)
- Barry P. Rosen (born 1944), American scientist
- Barry Ryan (1948–2021), English singer
- Barry Sanders (born 1968), American football player
- Barry Sheene (1950–2003), British motorcycle racer
- Barry Silkman (born 1952), English footballer
- Barry Simon (born 1946), American mathematical physicist
- Barry Smit, Canadian integrated geographer and climate researcher
- Barry Sullivan (actor) (1912–1994), American actor
- Barry Sullivan (disambiguation), multiple people
- Barry Switzer (born 1937), American football coach
- Barry Took (1928–2002), British screenwriter
- Barry Van Dyke (born 1951), American actor
- Barry Waddell (1936–2024), Australian cyclist
- Barry Wesley (born 1999), American football player
- Barry White (1944–2003), American singer
- Barry Wilcox (cyclist) (born 1978), American para-cyclist
- Barry Williams (disambiguation)
- Barry Wynks (1952–2020), New Zealand lawn bowler
- Barry Wynn (born 1945), American businessman

== People with Barry as a hypocoristic ==
- Barry Cassin (1924–2017), Irish actor
- Barry Cunliffe (born 1939), British archaeologist and academic
- Barry Freundel (born 1951), former rabbi and convicted voyeur
- Barry Hall (1921–2013), Australian diplomat and public servant
- Barry Hayles (born 1972), British footballer
- Barry Hulshoff (1946–2020), Dutch footballer
- Barry McGuigan (born 1961), Irish boxing promoter and retired boxer
- Barry Rogers (1935–1991), American jazz and salsa trombonist
- Barry Seal (1939–1986), American airline pilot, drug smuggler and informant
- Barry Sherman (1942–2017), Canadian billionaire, businessman, philanthropist and murder victim

== People with Barry as a nickname ==
- Barry Cullen (1935–2022), Canadian former National Hockey League player
- Barry Morgan (1944–2007), British drummer
- Barack Obama (born 1961), 44th President of the United States
- Barry Waldrep (born 1962), American musician, songwriter, record producer and composer

== Fictional characters with the given name ==
- Barry (American Dad!), a character on the TV series American Dad!
- Barry (Pokémon), a character from the Pokémon video game series
- Barry Allen, The Flash's real name
- Barry and Co., characters in the Conker series
- Barry B. Benson, a character from the animated film Bee Movie
- Barry Barry, a character from the TV series Waterloo Road
- Barry Berkman, the titular character from the TV series Barry
- Barry Burton from Resident Evil
- Barry Evans (EastEnders), a character from the TV series EastEnders
- Barry Kripke, a character on the TV series The Big Bang Theory
- Barry McKenzie, Australian comic strip and movie character
- Barry the Chopper, a character from the manga/anime series Fullmetal Alchemist

== See also ==
- The Barry Sisters (disambiguation)
- Barry (dog)
- Barrie (name)

== General and cited references ==
- "Barry Family History". Ancestry.com. n.d.
- "Parry Family History". Ancestry.com. n.d.
- Black, GF (1971) [1946]. The Surnames of Scotland: Their Origin, Meaning, and History. New York: The New York Public Library. ISBN 0-87104-172-3. OL 8346130M – via Open Library.
- de Bhulbh, S (1997). Sloinnte na h-Éireann: Irish Surnames. Limerick: Comhar-Chumann Íde Naofa Teo. ISBN 0-9530560-0-7. OL 316008M.
- Hanks, P; Hardcastle, K; Hodges, F (2006) [1990]. A Dictionary of First Names. Oxford Paperback Reference (2nd ed.). Oxford: Oxford University Press. ISBN 978-0-19-861060-1.
- MacLysaght, E (1972). Irish Families: Their Names, Arms and Origins (3rd ed.). New York: Crown Publishers. OL 23251759M – via Open Library.
- Ó Corráin, D; Maguire, F (1981). Gaelic Personal names. Dublin: Academy Press. ISBN 0-906187-39-7.
- Reaney, PH (1995). Wilson, RM (ed.). A Dictionary of English Surnames (3rd ed.). Oxford: Oxford University Press. ISBN 0-19-863146-4.
