= Silvio Hein =

American composer and songwriter (1879–1928)

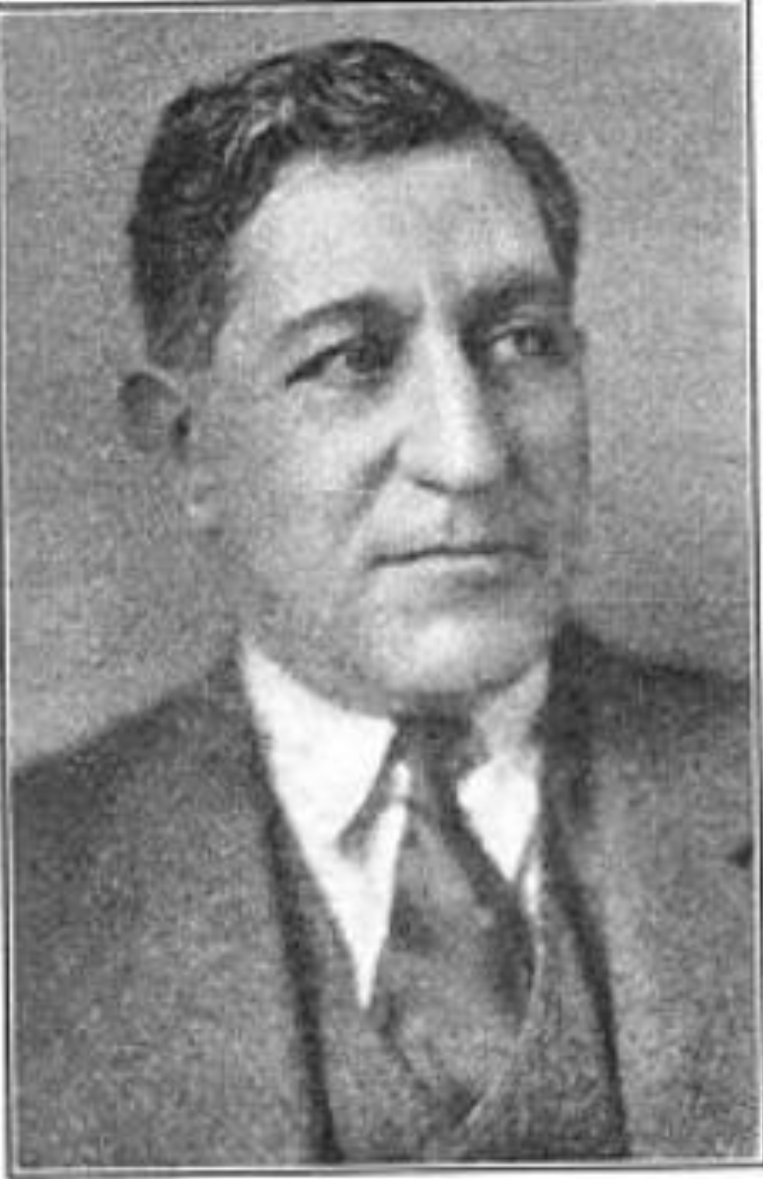
Hein, c. 1927

Silvio Hein (March 15, 1879 – December 19, 1928) was an American composer, songwriter, conductor, and theatrical producer. He was a songwriter for Tin Pan Alley and composed the scores to fourteen Broadway musicals. His most successful stage work was the 1917 musical Flo-Flo which he created with the French librettist and playwright Fred de Gresac. His songs were also interpolated into musicals created by others, including The Little Duchess and Ziegfeld Follies. In addition to his work writing music, he also worked as both a conductor and producer on Broadway. In 1914 he was a founding member of the American Society of Composers, Authors and Publishers.

== Early life and education ==
Born in New York City, Silvio Hein was the son of immigrant parents. His father was from Hungary and his mother from Italy. Sources vary over his music education background, with some claiming he studied music in Trieste and Vienna, and others that he was either completely self taught, or that he had piano instruction from his mother but no other formal training.

Hein himself did not describe his training in either of these manners. In a 1927 interview in The Musical Observer, he named several teachers he studied under in Boston, New York, and Italy. These included a Professor Cosmo in Trieste, the Boston-based conductor and instrumentalist John C. Mullally who had ties to the Boston Symphony Orchestra; brass player and conductor John M. Flockton who was a founding member of the Boston Symphony Orchestra's brass section as well as a leader of military bands in Massachusetts; and New York music critic and piano teacher James Huneker.

Hein also highlighted the influence of several of his relatives on his music development in this 1927 interview which included not only his mother but his aunt, Madame Riva, who sang with the Paris Opera, his maternal grandfather who had worked as a singer at the Teatro Lirico Giuseppe Verdi in Trieste, and his uncle, tenor Albert Pardo, who was a professional singer and church musician employed at St. Francis Xavier Church in Manhattan for 26 years.

== Career ==
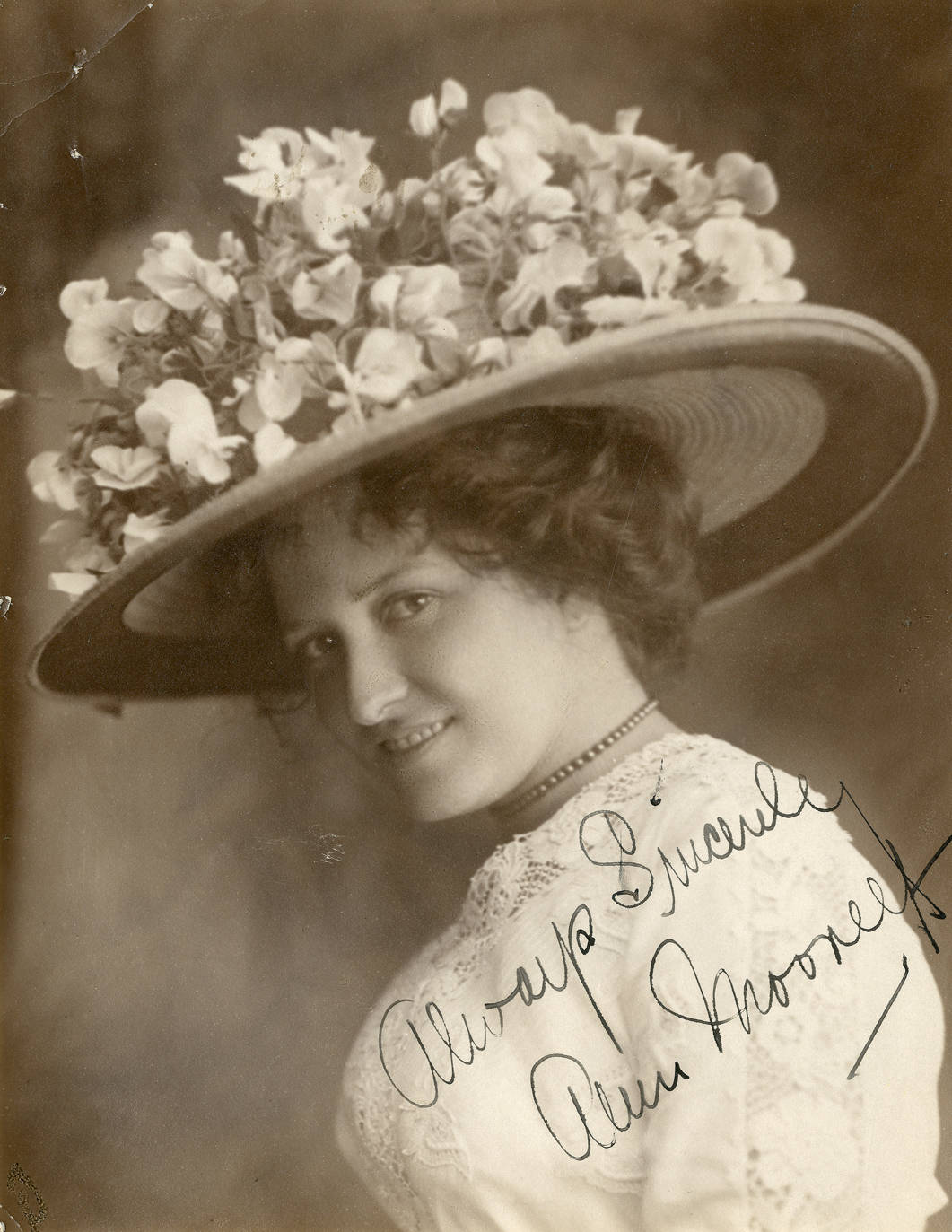
1910 photograph of Hein's wife, the actress Anna Mooney

Hein began composing music as a teenager and created his first operetta before he was twenty. His first hit song "Every Morn I Bring Thee Violets" was interpolated into the 1901 musical The Little Duchess and was performed in that production by Sydney Barraclough. Its sheet music became a best seller.

Hein's first musical, Moonshine, premiered at Broadway's Liberty Theatre on October 30, 1905. It was created as a starring vehicle for Marie Cahill, and the production later toured nationally under the new title Molly Moonshine after the Broadway run ended in January 1906. With the lyricist Matt Woodward he wrote the song "I Want to be a Drummer Boy" which was used as the Act I finale in Florenz Ziegfeld Jr.'s The Follies of 1907, the very first Ziegfeld Follies.

Hein continued to write music for Broadway into the early 1920s. His musical Marrying Mary (1906, Daly's Theatre) used lyrics by Benjamin Hapgood Burt and was based on Edwin Milton Royle's 1903 play My Husband's Wife. This was followed by The Boys and Betty (1908, Wallack's Theatre) which was another musical created for Marie Cahill. It was based on the 1907 French farce Le Papillon by René Peter and Robert Danceny. Hein's The Yankee Girl (1910, Herald Square Theatre) was a musical crafted for Blanche Ring.

Hein's musical A Matinee Idol (1910, Daly's Theatre) was a loose adaptation of Molière's 1645 play Le Médecin volant. This was followed by Judy Forgot (1910, Broadway Theatre) which was another Marie Cahill show in which she portrayed a woman suffering amnesia after a train crash. Hein's When Dreams Come True (1913, Lyric Theatre) was created for the dancer and actor Joseph Santley who in addition to starring in the production also choreographed the show.

Hein wrote the musical Miss Daisy (1914, Shubert Theatre) with playwright Philip Bartholomae who wrote both the lyrics and book. His musical Furs and Frills (1917, Casino Theatre) notably included the first song written by lyricist Oscar Hammerstein II, "Make Yourself at Home", to which Hein wrote the music. He had the biggest success of his career with the musical Flo-Flo (1917, Cort Theatre) which he created with the French librettist and playwright Fred de Gresac.

Hein's musical He Didn't Want to Do It (1918, Broadhurst Theatre) was created with lyricist and playwright George Broadhurst, and was an adaptation of a stage play of the same name co-authored by Broadhurst and Walter Hackett. Look Who's Here (1920, 44th Street Theatre) was a starring vehicle for married actors Cecil Lean and Cleo Mayfield. This was followed by the musical The Girl from Home (1920, Globe Theatre) which was based on Richard Harding Davis's 1904 hit play The Dictator. Hein's final musical, Some Party (1922, Jolson's 59th Street Theatre), was a musical revue that he created with R. H. Burnside.

Hein was married to the actress Anna Mooney (sometimes credited as Ann Mooney). She had roles in several of his musicals. In addition to his work as a composer, he served as conductor for many of his own Broadway musicals as well as some written by others. He produced the 1917 Broadway revival of William Shakespeare's The Merry Wives of Windsor at the Park Theatre.

== Illness and death ==
Hein suffered from a bad chronic lung infection throughout much of his adulthood, and was living during a period before modern antibiotics, such as penicillin, were available to the public. This chronic illness forced Hein to periodically take long periods of rest which interrupted his activities as an artist. Ultimately, his health declined to the point that he was forced to retire at the relatively young age of 46; relocating to a sanatorium in Saranac Lake, New York. He lived under medical care there until his death at the age of 49 on December 19, 1928.

Hein was a member of the Lamb's Club. His funeral service on December 21, 1928, was officiated by Rabbi Nathan D. Krass of Temple Emanu-El at Campbell's Funeral Church at Broadway and Sixth St. A much beloved member of New York's theatre and music community, his funeral had a large number of well-known entertainers and artists in attendance. Several prominent musicians and people connected to the American theatre were pallbearers at the funeral, including composers Jerome Kern, Irving Berlin, and John Philip Sousa; actor and 'Shepherd of the Lambs Club' Fritz Williams (1865–1930); Broadway producer and playwright R. H. Burnside; songwriter Raymond Hubbell; and music publisher George Maxwell who was the first president of the American Society of Composers, Authors and Publishers. He was buried at The Evergreens Cemetery in Brooklyn.

== Songs ==
"Bubbles" (1917)
Hein's 1917 "Bubbles"

- "Every Morn I Bring Thee Violets", used in the 1901 musical The Little Duchess
- "I Want to be a Drummer Boy" with lyricist Matt Woodward

== Musicals ==
- Moonshine (1905)
- Marrying Mary (1906, Daly's Theatre)
- The Boys and Betty (1908, Wallack's Theatre)
- The Yankee Girl (1910, Herald Square Theatre)
- A Matinee Idol (1910, Daly's Theatre)
- Judy Forgot (1910, Broadway Theatre)
- When Dreams Come True (1913, Lyric Theatre)
- Miss Daisy (1914, Shubert Theatre) with book and lyrics by Philip Bartholomae
- Furs and Frills (1917, Casino Theatre)
- Flo-Flo (1917, Cort Theatre)
- The Merry Wives of Windsor (1917), production of William Shakespeare's The Merry Wives of Windsor
- He Didn't Want to Do It (1918, Broadhurst Theatre)
- Look Who's Here (1920, 44th Street Theatre)
- The Girl from Home (1920, Globe Theatre)
- Some Party (1922, Jolson's 59th Street Theatre)
