= Florenz Ames =

American actor (1883–1961)

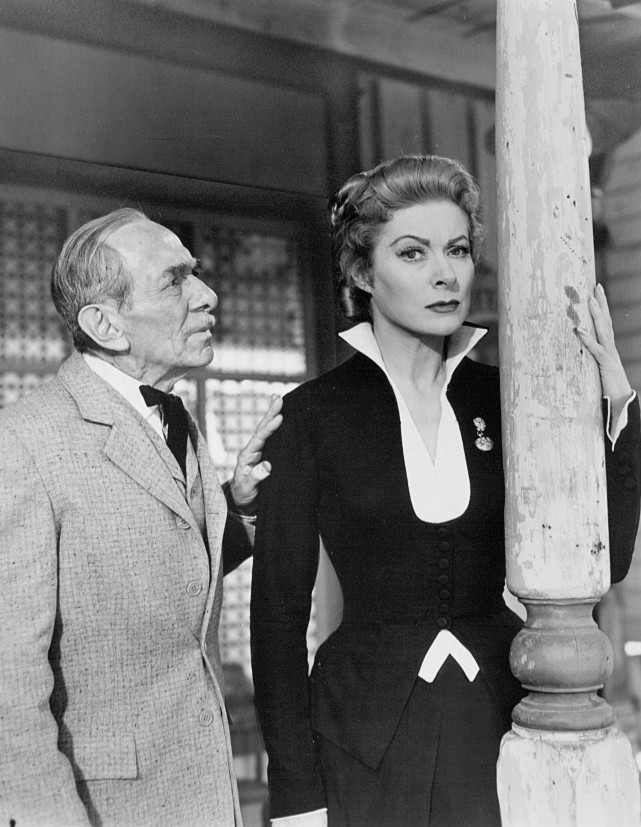
- Florenz Ames with Greer Garson in Telephone Time, 1957.
- Born: Florenz Sebastian Kolb; January 6, 1883; Rochester, New York
- Died: February 11, 1958 (aged 75); New York City
- Occupations: Actor, singer, dancer
- Years active: 1920s–1950s
- Spouses: Alice "Adelaide" Winthrop; Alice O'Donnell

Florenz Ames (born Florenz Sebastian Kolb) was an American film and theater actor, dancer, and singer.

== Biography ==
Florenz Ames was born in Rochester, New York in a family with German roots. He began his acting career very late. With the support of his older brother, playwright Winthrop Ames, a prominent theater and music hall producer in New York at the time, he started out as a singer and dancer in vaudeville, often performing small scenes with his wife, Alice "Adelaide" Winthrop. Under the name "Ames and Winthrop", they appeared in a revue called Alice in Blunderland, with Winthrop in the title role and Ames playing the other parts. He eventually established himself on Broadway and appeared in a number of shows and musicals from before World War I through the Korean War, including the original productions of Of Thee I Sing, and Oklahoma!, as well as several Gilbert and Sullivan operas.

From 1950 to 1956, he played Inspector Richard Queen in the first television adaptation of Ellery Queen detective series, sharing the title role with Lee Bowman. From then on, his screen career took off, with numerous film and television roles appearing between 1950 and 1958. He appeared alongside some of the biggest names in Hollywood of the 1950s: Grace Kelly, Robert Mitchum, Barry Sullivan, Marlon Brando, Anthony Quinn, Glenn Ford, Greer Garson, Doris Day, and others.

== Broadway musicals ==
- 1917: Hitchy-Koo
- 1920: Frivolities
- 1923: Lady Butterfly
- 1923: Nifties
- 1924-1925: Madame Pompadour
- 1925: Sky High
- 1926: The Great Temptations
- 1928-1929: Angela
- 1929: The Silver Swan
- 1930: The Count of Luxembourg
- 1930: Who Cares?
- 1931: The Singing Rabbi
- 1931 to 1933: Of Thee I Sing
- 1933: A Church Mouse
- 1933-1934: Let 'Em Eat Cake
- 1935-1952: First Lady
- 1937-1938: I'd Rather Be Right
- 1940: The Return of the Vagabond
- 1941: Snookie
- 1941: Mr. Big
- 1942: The Pirates of Penzance
- 1943 to 1948: Oklahoma!
- 1950: Arms and the Girl

== Filmography ==
=== Movies ===
- 1930: Let's Merge (short)
- 1939: A Swing Opera (short) as The Coach
- 1952: Viva Zapata! as Senor Espejo
- 1954: The Human Jungle as Leonard Ustick
- 1955: Texas Lady as Wilson
- 1955: Man with the Gun as Doc Hughes
- 1956: That Certain Feeling as Senator Winston
- 1956: The Fastest Gun Alive as Joe Fenwick
- 1956: He Laughed Last as George Eagle
- 1956: The Girl He Left Behind as Mr. Hillaby
- 1956: The King and Four Queens as Josiah Sweet
- 1957: The Big Caper as Paulmeyer
- 1957: The Deadly Mantis as Professor Anton Gunther
- 1958: Teacher's Pet as JR Ballantyne

=== Television ===
- 1950-1956: The Adventures of Ellery Queen as Inspector Richard Queen.
- 1953: Robert Montgomery Presents
- 1953: Johnny Jupiter as Gregory Latham
- 1953–1954: Kraft Television Theater
- 1954-1955: Studio One as Dave Sears
- 1954-1956: Cavalcade of America
- 1954-1957: Lux Video Theater
- 1955: The Star and the Story
- 1955: Screen Directors Playhouse as JB Vandemeer.
- 1955: Four Star Playhouse as Mr. Scratch.
- 1955: The Philco Television Playhouse
- 1956: The People's Choice as Judge Cagle
- 1956: The Hardy Boys as Mr. Applegate
- 1956: Broken Arrow as Emperor Norton
- 1956-1957: Telephone Time as Barber
- 1957: The O. Henry Playhouse as Simon Harrington
- 1957: Gunsmoke as John Peavy
- 1957: Hey, Jeannie! as Hesby
- 1957: Crossroads as Mr. Kramer
- 1957: Climax!, episode "The Gold Dress"
- 1957: Blondie as JC Dithers
- 1957: Father Knows Best as Magistrate
- 1957: Dr. Hudson's Secret Journal as Dr. Follansbee
- 1958: Colgate Theater , episode "Welcome to Washington"
