= Waldrep =

Waldrep is a family name that may refer to:

- Barry Waldrep (born 1962), American musician, songwriter and composer
- Evan Waldrep (born 1997), American soccer player
- G. C. Waldrep (born 1968), American poet and historian
- Hurston Waldrep (born 2002), American baseball pitcher
- Kent Waldrep (1954–2022), American collegiate football player and disability rights activist
- Phil Waldrep (born 1960), ordained Southern Baptist minister, speaker and author
- Waldrep Dairy Farm in Florida
