= Inspector (disambiguation) =

Inspector is a police rank.

Inspector or The Inspector may also refer to:

- Inspector, a person working in the field of inspection

== Arts, entertainment, and media ==
=== Cartoons ===
- The Inspector, a cartoon series based on the Inspector Clouseau character from the Pink Panther films
- "The Inspector", an episode of the cartoon She-Ra: Princess of Power

=== Films ===
- Inspector (1953 film), a 1953 Indian Tamil language film
- Inspector (1956 film), a Bollywood suspense thriller film, directed by Shakti Samanta
- The Inspector (1962 film), a drama starring Stephen Boyd and Dolores Hart
- Inspector (1968 film), an Indian Malayalam film
- Inspector (1970 film), a Bollywood action thriller film

=== Other uses in arts, entertainment, and media ===
- Inspector (band), a Mexican music band, which fuses ska and reggae with Mexican rhythms
- The Inspector, a 1973 collection of drawings by The New Yorker cartoonist Saul Steinberg
- The Inspector (play), play by William Ranney Wilson

== Other uses ==
- Inspector (role variant), a personality type in the Keirsey Temperament Sorter
- Chalcostephia flavifrons, or Inspector, a species of dragonfly
- People who perform building inspections
- People who perform home inspections

== See also ==
- Inspector Clouseau, a character from the Pink Panther films
- Inspector Gadget, a media franchise that began in 1983
- Inspector general, an investigative official
- Inspector window, a type of computing window
- Inspectorate, a body charged with reporting on some institution in its field of competence
- "The Safety Inspector", a Swift and Shift Couriers episode
