= Barry Evans =

Barry Evans may refer to:

- Barry Evans (actor) (1943–1997), English actor and television performer
- Barry Evans (baseball) (born 1955), former Major League Baseball third baseman
- Barry Evans (EastEnders), fictional character in the British TV soap opera EastEnders
- Barry Evans (footballer, born 1936), Australian footballer for South Melbourne
- Barry Evans (footballer, born 1963), Australian footballer for Collingwood
- Barry Evans (rugby union) (born 1962), English rugby player
