= Of Thee I Sing =

Musical by George and Ira Gershwin

- First edition 1932
- Music: George Gershwin
- Lyrics: Ira Gershwin
- Book: George S. Kaufman; Morrie Ryskind
- Productions: 1931 Broadway; 1933 Broadway revival 1952 Broadway revival 1972 Television; 2006 City Center Encores!
- Awards: Pulitzer Prize for Drama (1932)

Of Thee I Sing is a musical with a score by George Gershwin, lyrics by Ira Gershwin and a book by George S. Kaufman and Morrie Ryskind. The musical lampoons American politics; the story concerns John P. Wintergreen, who runs for President of the United States on the "love" platform. When he falls in love with the sensible Mary Turner instead of Diana Devereaux, the beautiful pageant winner selected for him, he gets into political hot water.

The original Broadway production, directed by Kaufman, opened in 1931 and ran for 441 performances, gaining critical and box office success. It has been revived twice on Broadway and in concert stagings in the U.S. and in London. In 1932, Of Thee I Sing was the first musical to win the Pulitzer Prize for Drama.

== Background ==
The Gershwins and George S. Kaufman had collaborated on the satirical 1927 musical Strike up the Band, which played in Philadelphia. The show concerned a cheese manufacturer who sponsors a war against Switzerland because it will be named after him.

Later that year, Kaufman and Ryskind conceived a new musical focusing on satire about rival political parties battling over a new national anthem. The Gershwin brothers agreed to write the score, although they were scheduled to be in Hollywood writing songs for the film Delicious. Kaufman and Ryskind soon realized that their concept did not provide sufficient plot for a musical. They crafted a libretto inspired by the timeless battle of political idealism with corruption and incompetency, creating the first American musical with a consistently satiric tone. The writers and the cast were unsure of what the public's reception would be, prompting Kaufman's now-famous remark "Satire is what closes on Saturday night."

== Plot ==
=== Act I ===
In the U.S. in the 1930s, a campaign parade is taking place to support "Wintergreen for President". John P. Wintergreen has been nominated for President and Alexander Throttlebottom has been nominated for Vice President, but he is of such little importance no one can remember who he is. Politicians meet in a hotel room to devise a campaign platform, and when they ask the chambermaid what she cares about, she first says "money," then "love" when pressed further. The men decide that Wintergreen's platform will be "love"; they'll have a pageant to select the most beautiful girl in the United States, and Wintergreen will fall in love and marry her.

The pageant begins in Atlantic City, New Jersey, and the contestants wonder, "Who Is the Lucky Girl to Be?" The photographers assure them that even if they do not win, they will surely be loved ("The Dimple on My Knee"). Wintergreen is getting nervous about marrying a girl he doesn't know. While the girls are at the final judging, he confides in Mary Turner, the sensible young woman running the pageant. He does not want to marry a girl just because she's beautiful; he wants a wife who will make a good home for him and his future children. Mary shares her corn muffin with him. Wintergreen tells Mary that he'd rather marry her than any of the girls in the contest. He kisses her, and she agrees to marry him. The judges of the pageant announce that Diana Devereaux, a beautiful southern girl, has won the contest, but Wintergreen declares that he loves Mary Turner. When he gives some of Mary's extraordinary corn muffins to the judges, they agree that John and Mary are meant to wed ("Because, Because").

Outside Madison Square Garden in New York City, at a rally for Wintergreen, the campaigners declare that "Love Is Sweeping the Country". Inside, where politicians are speaking in favor of Wintergreen, a wrestling match is going on just below the speakers' platform as Alexander Throttlebottom tries to explain to the organizers that he's the candidate for Vice-President. Wintergreen proposes to Mary onstage, as he has in forty-seven states before. She accepts again, and Wintergreen sings the campaign song to her, "Of Thee I Sing".

On election night, Wintergreen wins by a landslide. Inauguration Day arrives, which is also Wintergreen's wedding day. As his inaugural address, Wintergreen bids goodbye to the girls he used to know ("Here's a Kiss for Cinderella"). The Chief Justice presides over the wedding ceremony, and just after he has pronounced John and Mary man and wife, Diana Devereaux interrupts the proceedings. She is serving Wintergreen with a summons for breach of promise. She insists she is the one he should have married ("I Was the Most Beautiful Blossom"). The Supreme Court rules that Mary's corn muffins are more important than justice in this matter, and Diana angrily leaves to tell her story across the nation. Wintergreen leads the Supreme Court and spectators in a chorus of "Of Thee I Sing".

=== Act II ===
John and Mary settle down to business in the White House. Her "desk," back-to-back with his, is a fully loaded tea-table. Their secretaries greet each other "Hello, Good Morning". Alexander Throttlebottom, now Vice-President, sneaks into the White House with a tour group. When a guide tells him that the Vice-President's job is to preside over the U. S. Senate, Throttlebottom eagerly dashes off to the Capitol. Wintergreen's fellow party members inform him that Diana Devereaux is gaining support across the nation. Wintergreen holds a press conference and tells the reporters that his love for Mary is the only thing that matters ("Who Cares?"). The French ambassador unexpectedly arrives ("Garçon, S'il Vous Plaît"). He has a surprise for Mr. Wintergreen: Diana is "'The Illegitimate Daughter' of an illegitimate son of an illegitimate nephew of Napoleon." He insists that Wintergreen annul his marriage and marry Diana to right his grievous offense against France. Everyone agrees that Wintergreen should be impeached for breach of promise ("We'll Impeach Him"), but John and Mary do not care, since they have each other ("Who Cares?" (Reprise)).

Throttlebottom has found the Senate, and the party members inform him that he will soon be President. He is very excited and goes into the Senate Chamber to preside, beginning by taking "The Roll Call." The resolution on the impeachment of the President is brought up, and the French Ambassador and Diana mournfully insist that she was "Jilted." Mary saves the day when she announces that she is pregnant ("Who Could Ask for Anything More?"). The senators refuse to impeach an expectant father, and Wintergreen declares that "Posterity" is just around the corner. The French Ambassador informs Wintergreen that by not marrying Diana, he has contributed to France's declining birth rate. He demands the Wintergreens' baby as a replacement for the one they have "taken" from France. John refuses, and the ambassador walks out.

In the Yellow Room of the White House, guests are arriving bearing gifts for the baby ("Trumpeter, Blow Your Horn"). Wintergreen is nervously awaiting the baby's birth when the French Ambassador arrives with a final message from France: surrender the baby or France will sever diplomatic relations with the U.S. The Supreme Court justices, who have the duty to determine the sex of the baby, announce that twins have been born, a boy and a girl. The French ambassador is even more wounded by this proclamation: France has lost two babies instead of one! Diana mournfully joins him, and Alexander Throttlebottom arrives bearing sweaters for the babies. The French Ambassador is about to declare war when Wintergreen has a brilliant idea: according to Article Twelve of the Constitution, when the President of the United States is unable to fulfill his duties, his obligations are assumed by the Vice-President! The ambassador calls Wintergreen a genius, and Throttlebottom is ecstatic as they pass Diana over to him. Servants wheel a large bed into the room, where Mary sits with the babies. Wintergreen leads everyone in proclaiming, "Of Thee I Sing."

== Casts ==
Character	Original Broadway Production	US National Tour	Broadway Return Engagement	Pittsburgh Civic Light Opera Production	Broadway Revival	Off-Broadway Revival	CBS Television Production	Berkshire Theatre Festival Production	New York Concert Production	Reprise Theatre Company Production	Paper Mill Playhouse Production	Encores! Production	MasterVoices Concert at Carnegie Hall
Character	1931-1933	1932	1933	1948	1952	1969	1972	1976	1987	1998	2004	2006	2017
John P. Wintergreen	William Gaxton	Oscar Shaw	William Gaxton	Wilbur Evans	Jack Carson	Hal Holden	Carroll O'Connor	Sam Freed	Larry Kert	Gregory Harrison	Ron Bohmer	Victor Garber	Bryce Pinkham
Mary Turner	Lois Moran	Harriette Lake	Harriette Lake	Gloria Hamilton	Betty Oakes	Joy Franz	Cloris Leachman	Jackie Cronin	Maureen McGovern	Maureen McGovern	Garrett Long	Jennifer Laura Thompson	Denée Benton
Diana Devereaux	Grace Brinkley	Roberta Robinson	Betty Allen	Audrey Johnston	Lenore Lonergan	Katie Anders	Michele Lee	Katie Anders	Paige O'Hara	Heather Lee	Sarah Knowlton	Jenny Powers	Elizabeth Stanley
Alexander Throttlebottom	Victor Moore	Donald Meek	Victor Moore	William Lynn	Paul Hartman	Lloyd Hubbard	Jack Gilford	Ed Preble	Jack Gilford	Charlie Dell	Wally Dunn	Jefferson Mays	Kevin Chamberlin
Senator Robert F. Lyons	George E. Mack	Francis Pierlot	George E. Mack	Walter Burke	Donald Foster	Edward Penn	Jim Backus	Hansford Rowe	Walter Hook	—N/a	Hal Blankenship	Jonathan Freeman	—N/a
Senator Carver Jones	Edward H. Robins	—N/a	Edward H. Robins	J. English Smith	Howard Freeman	John Aman	—N/a	—N/a	Mark Zimmerman	—N/a	Herndon Lackey	Erick Devine	—N/a
Matthew Arnold Fulton	Dudley Clements	Cecil Lean	Dudley Clements	Edmund Dorsay	Loring Smith	William Martel	Jesse White	Edward Holmes	Raymond Thorne	Lenny Wolpe	Richard Poe	Michael Mulheren	Chuck Cooper
Louis Lippman	Sam Mann	Abe Reynolds	Abe Reynolds	Lewis Charles	Robert F. Simon	—N/a	Herb Edelman	James Hilbrandt	Merwin Goldsmith	Gus Corrado	Adam Grupper	Lewis J. Stalden	Brad Oscar
The French Ambassador	Florenz Ames	Adrian Rosley	Florenz Ames	Le Roi Operti	Florenz Ames	Larry Whiteley	—N/a	Paul Nixon	Jack Dabdoub	Jason Graae	Fred Berman	David Pittu	David Pittu
Francis X. Gilhooney	Harold Moffet	Willam J. Pringle	Harold Moffet	Gordon Dilworth	J. Pat O'Malley	Sandy Sprung	David Doyle	Douglas Fisher	Frank Kopyc	Craig Wasson	Nick Corley	Wayne Duvall	Fred Applegate
Sam Jenkins	George Murphy	Al Sexton	George Murphy	Walter Long	Jonathan Lucas	Danny Franklin	Garrett Lewis	Steven Gelfor	George Dvorsky	Jason Ma	Sean Palmer	Jeffry Denman	Rhett Guter

== Songs ==
Act I

- Wintergreen for President* – Ensemble
- Who is the Lucky Girl to Be? – Diana Devereaux and Ensemble
- The Dimple on My Knee – Diana, Sam Jenkins and Ensemble
- Because, Because – Diana, Sam and Ensemble
- As the Chairman of the Committee – Matthew Arnold Fulton and Company
- How Beautiful – Company
- Never Was There a Girl So Fair – Company
- Some Girls Can Bake a Pie – John P. Wintergreen, Mary Turner and Company
- Love is Sweeping the Country – Sam, Emily Benson and Ensemble
- Of Thee I Sing – Wintergreen, Mary and Company
- Here's a Kiss for Cinderella – Wintergreen and Ensemble
- I Was the Most Beautiful Blossom – Diana
- Some Girls Can Bake a Pie (Reprise) – Wintergreen, Diana, Judges and Ensemble

Act II

- Hello, Good Morning – Sam, Emily and Secretaries
- Who Cares? – Wintergreen, Mary and Reporters
- Garçon, S'il Vous Plaît** – French Soldiers
- The Illegitimate Daughter – The French Ambassador and Ensemble
- We'll Impeach Him – Senator Robert E. Lyons, Francis X. Gilhooley and Ensemble
- Who Cares? (Reprise) – Wintergreen and Mary
- The (Senatorial) Roll Call – Alexander Throttlebottom and Ensemble
- Jilted – Diana and Company
- Who Could Ask for Anything More? – Mary and Company
- Posterity – Wintergreen and Company
- Trumpeter, Blow Your Horn – Ensemble
- Finale – Company

*The campaign song "Wintergreen for President" includes parts of folk and patriotic songs such as Sousa's "Stars and Stripes Forever" and "Hail, Hail, the Gang's All Here". The song has been adopted by the Harvard University Band as a pep song, and it is traditionally played at Harvard football games.
**The music introducing the French and their ambassador includes the opening bars of Gershwin's own "An American in Paris".

== Musical and dramatic analysis ==
Of Thee I Sing was the most musically sophisticated of the Gershwin shows up to then, inspired by the works of Gilbert and Sullivan and boasting a varied score including extensive recitative, choral commentary, marches, pastiches, elaborate contrapuntal passages, and ballads. Most songs were lengthy and included a large ensemble. As an integrated song-and-story production it produced fewer hit songs than many of the Gershwins' musicals. Ira Gershwin explained, "In the show there are no verse-and-chorus songs; there is a sort of recitative running along, and lots of finales and finalettos." Ira Gershwin recalled that the title song, inspired by the final phrase of "My Country, 'Tis of Thee", was somewhat controversial among the production staff. "When we first played this sentimental political campaign song... there were objectors who thought that juxtaposing the dignified 'of thee I sing' with a slangy 'baby' was going a bit too far. Our response was that, naturally, we'd replace it with something else if the paying audience didn't take to it. Opening night, and even weeks later, one could hear a continuous 'Of thee I sing, baby!' in the lobby at intermission time." The music was "employed throughout in what was unquestionably the most closely integrated manner of any Broadway show to that time... Almost everything...was created with a skill that had rarely been equaled in the musical comedy theatre."

Of Thee I Sing was the first American musical with a consistently satirical tone. Congress, the U.S. Supreme Court, the presidency, and the democratic process itself were all targets of this satire, prompting original stars William Gaxton and Victor Moore to wonder if they would face government repercussions for their portrayals of President Wintergreen and Vice President Throttlebottom. Specific political parties are not identified in the musical, as Kaufman and Ryskind believed that absurdity was bipartisan in Depression-era politics.

== Productions ==
The original Broadway production, directed by Kaufman, opened at the Music Box Theatre on December 26, 1931, and ran for 441 performances. The cast included William Gaxton as John P. Wintergreen, Lois Moran as Mary Turner, Grace Brinkley as Diana Devereaux, Victor Moore as Alexander Throttlebottom, and George Murphy as Sam Jenkins. It was produced by Sam H. Harris. Sets were designed by Jo Mielziner, costumes by Carles LeMaire, and dances staged by Georgie Hale. It was Gaxton and Moore's first comedic pairing; they would collaborate on six more Broadway musicals, including Anything Goes. The orchestrations were by Robert Russell Bennett, William Daly (including the "Overture"), and Gershwin ("Hello, Good Morning"). Of Thee I Sing was the longest-running Gershwin show during George Gershwin's lifetime.

There were Broadway revivals in 1933 at the Imperial Theatre and in 1952 at the Ziegfeld Theatre, both directed by Kaufman. A concert production of Of Thee I Sing was mounted by Ian Marshall Fisher's Lost Musicals series at the Barbican Centre in London in August 1996. Fisher's series examines the Gershwins' lesser known works (as well as others) and has been based at London's Royal Opera House and Sadler's Wells. The musical was presented in 1990 by the New York Gilbert and Sullivan Players and in 2004 the Paper Mill Playhouse revived the work in a new staging by Tina Landau that was partly a satire of the 2004 United States presidential campaigns of George W. Bush and John Kerry with Tom Helm as the production's music director. It starred Ron Bohmer as Wintergreen and Garrett Long as Mary.

In May 2006 Of Thee I Sing was staged as part of the New York City Center Encores! concert series. Directed by John Rando and choreographed by Randy Skinner, the cast starred Victor Garber as Wintergreen, Jefferson Mays as Throttlebottom, and Jennifer Laura Thompson as First Lady. It was revived in July 2015 at the Royal Festival Hall, London, by producer Ollie Rosenblatt as a full musical with orchestra. Devereaux was played by Hannah Waddingham, Wintergreen by Hadley Fraser, and Throttlebottom by Tom Edden. The Royal Philharmonic Concert Orchestra provided a new orchestration for the piece. In September 2015 the Sqabbalogic theatre company and Sydney Philharmonia Choirs presented the musical in the Concert Hall, Sydney Opera House.

== Adaptations ==
A television version was produced in 1972 by CBS, mostly starring actors then appearing in CBS series, including Carroll O'Connor as President Wintergreen. A National Radio Theater version starring John Cullum was broadcast by NPR in 1984 and the BBC in 1984 and 1992.

In the 1930s, the Marx Brothers had intended to produce a film adaptation of the musical, but they decided to make Duck Soup instead. Many scholars draw parallels between Of Thee I Sing and Duck Soup, suggesting that the musical helped provide inspiration for that Marx Brothers classic.

A musical sequel to Of Thee I Sing was written by the same team: Let 'Em Eat Cake was produced on Broadway in 1933, reusing some of the music from its predecessor. However, the sequel was a critical and box-office failure. Let 'Em Eat Cake marked the last Broadway musical written by the Gershwins (counting Porgy and Bess as an opera rather than a musical).

== Critical reception ==
Brooks Atkinson in the New York Times called the musical "a brisk musical comedy", writing that "There is dancing, both routine and inventive. There are lyrics done in Ira Gershwin's neatest style...Best of all, there is Mr. Gershwin's score. Whether it is satire, wit, doggerel or fantasy, Mr. Gershwin pours music out in full measure and in many voices. Although the book is lively, Mr. Gershwin is exuberant."

In 1932, Of Thee I Sing became the first musical to win the Pulitzer Prize for drama. The 1932 Pulitzer Prize Committee stated, "Of Thee I Sing is not only coherent and well-knit enough to class as a play, but it is a biting and true satire on American politics and the public attitude towards them.... The play is genuine and it is felt the Pulitzer Prize could not serve a better purpose than to recognize such work. The prize was awarded only to Kaufman, Ryskind and Ira Gershwin; George Gershwin received no recognition, since the Pulitzer Prize was considered a literary award. In 1998, at the centennial of his birth, he was posthumously awarded an honorary Pulitzer.

In his New York Times review of the 2006 concert revival, Charles Isherwood called Of Thee I Sing "a trenchant little musical satire... the laughter that greets the show today is tinged with surprise at how eerily some of its jokes seem to take precise aim, from decades back, at current affairs. A chorus of reporters sings to the new president of the '17 vacations you have had since you've been here.' A politician dismisses Abraham Lincoln's pronouncement about not being able to fool all of the people all the time by remarking: 'It's different nowadays. People are bigger suckers.' ...it serves as a sigh-inducing argument for the enduring follies of American politics."
