= Frazer Coulter =

Canadian-born American actor (1848–1937)

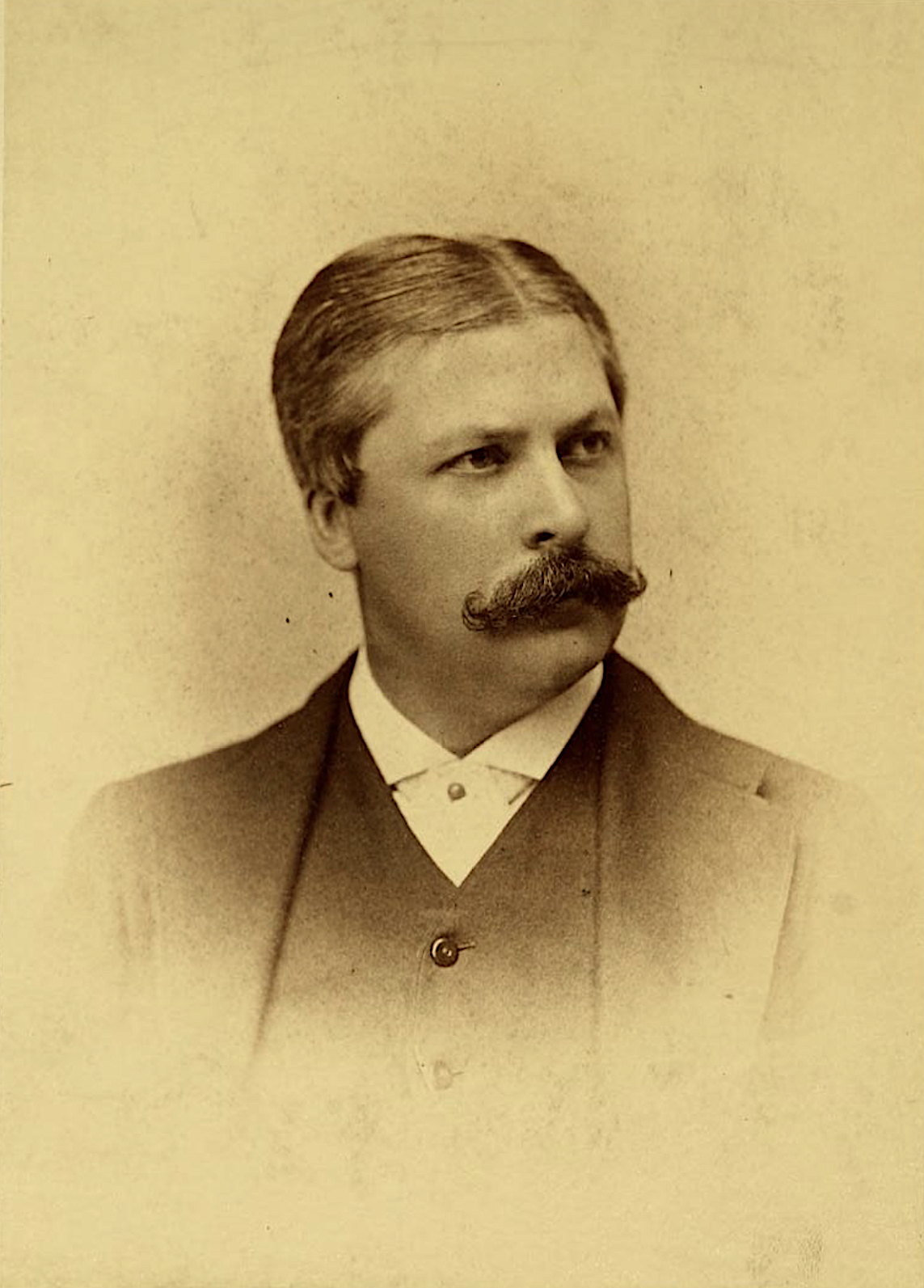
Frazer Coulter, c. 1882

Frazer Coulter, sometimes given as Fraser Coalter, (August 20, 1848 – January 26, 1937) was a Canadian-born American actor. He had a lengthy stage career in New York, making his Broadway debut in the late 1870s in The School for Scandal and his final appearance in Oh, Promise Me in 1931. He also appeared in several silent films during the 1910s and 1920s.

== Life and career ==
Frazer Coulter was born on August 20, 1848 in Smiths Falls, Ontario, Canada. He started performing full time as an actor in 1876, having appeared previously in a few amateur and professional productions. He began his career performing as Harry Coulter, and changed his stage name to Frazer Coulter in 1879. From 1881-1885 he was a member of the Boston Theatre Stock Company. He had a prolific career on Broadway; starring in productions from the 1870s until his retirement more than 50 years later.

Coulter was active as a silent film actor during the 1910s and 1920s. His first film was The Prisoner of Zenda (1913) in which he played the role of as Colonel Sapt. This was followed by appearances in Body and Soul (1915, as Dr. McDonald), The Face at Your Window (1920, as Nicholas Harding), His Brother's Keeper (1921, as William Harding), Love's Redemption (1921, as Club Steward), The Heart Raider (1923, as Reginald Gray), The Governor's Lady (1923, as George Strickland), and A Society Scandal (1924, as Schuyler Burr); the latter of which starred Gloria Swanson. His final film appearance was as the lawyer in the Ben Lyon and Lois Moran picture Prince of Tempters (1926).

After retiring from the stage in 1931 he lived at the Percy Williams Home for Actors in East Islip, New York. He died in East Islip on January 26, 1937 at the age of 88.

== Partial list of Broadway credits ==
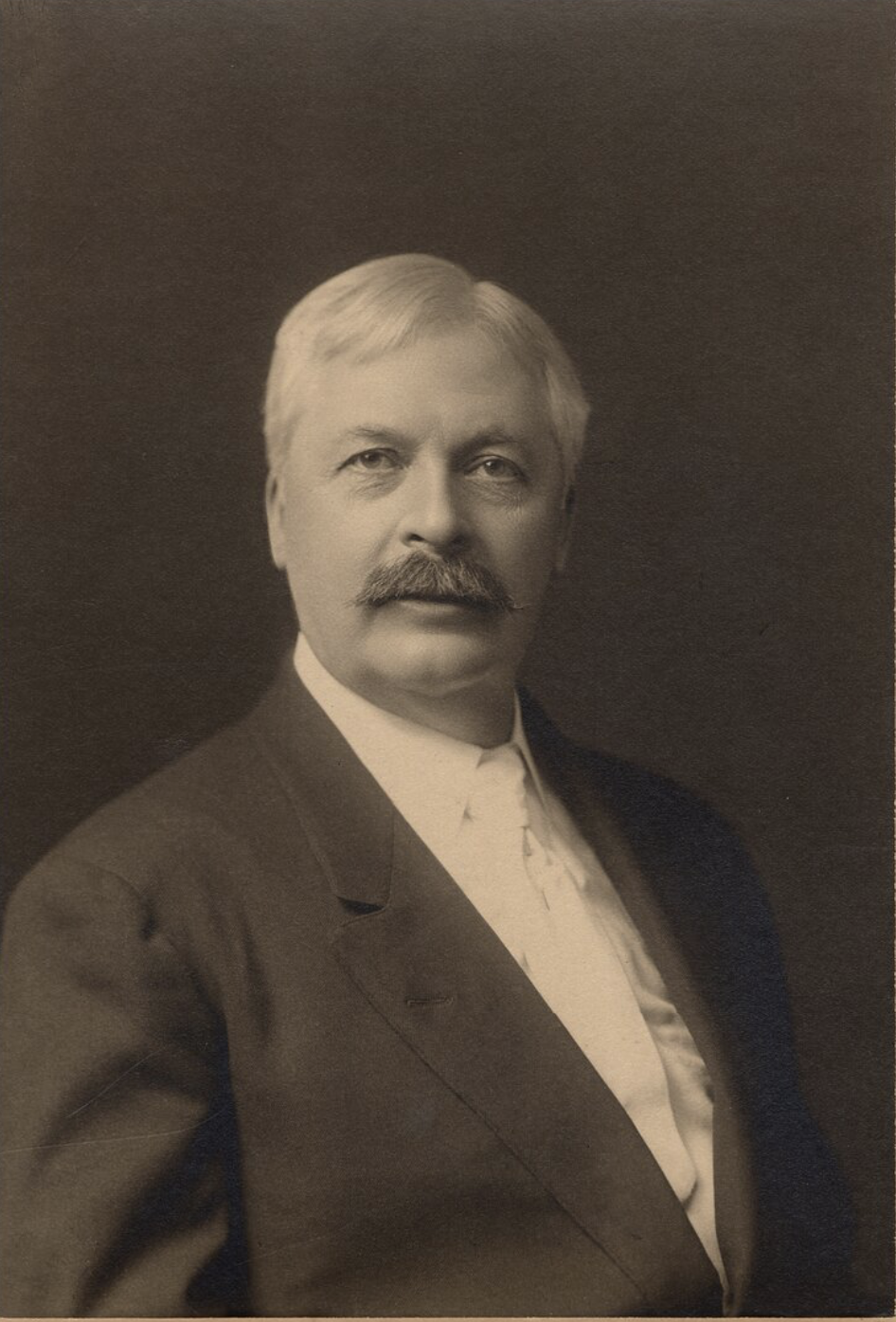
Frazer Coulter

- William Ranney Wilson's The Inspector (1890, title role, Park Theatre)
- Sutton Vane's Humanity (1895, as Major Fordyce Dangerfield at Haverly's 14th Street Theatre)
- Augustus Thomas's The Capitol (1895, as Mr. Carroll at the Standard Theatre)
- Sydney Rosenfeld's A House of Cards (1896, as Peter Burlap at the Fifth Avenue Theatre)
- Joseph I. C. Clarke's Her Majesty, the Girl Queen of Nordenmark (1900, as Baron Hausman at the Manhattan Theatre)
- Richard Harding Davis's Ranson's Folly (1904, as Captain Chase at the Hudson Theatre)
- Henri Dumay's Mademoiselle Marni (1905, as General Stanislaus Newville at Wallack's Theatre)
- Charles Klein's The Lion and the Mouse (1905, Ex-Judge Stott at the Lyceum Theatre)
- Louis Evan Shipman's The Grain of Dust (1912, as Isaac Burroughs at the Criterion Theatre)
- Silvio Hein and Philip Bartholomae's When Dreams Come True (1913, as Jerome K. Hedges at the Lyric Theatre)
- Thompson Buchanan's Life (1914-1915, as William Van Rensselaer Stuyvasant at the Manhattan Opera House)
- George V. Hobart's Experience (1918, Wealth at the Manhattan Opera House)
- James W. Elliott's The Man in the Making (1921, Theodore Barco, Hudson Theatre)
- Samuel Shipman's Lawful Larceny (1922, Mr. Davis at the Theatre Republic)
- Rudolf Besier and May Edginton's Secrets (1922-1923, Dr. Arbuthnot at the Fulton Theatre)
- Oliver Goldsmith's She Stoops to Conquer (1924, Sir Charles Marlow at the Empire Theatre)
- Walter Archer Frost's Cape Smoke (1925, Doctor Hammerstone at the Martin Beck Theatre)
- Shakespeare's Henry IV, Part 1 (1926, Earl of Northumberland at the Knickerbocker Theatre)
- William Shakespeare's Julius Caesar (1927, Popilius Lena at the New Amsterdam Theatre)
- Margaret Ayer Barnes's The Age of Innocence (1928-1929, Mr. Henry van der Luyden at Empire Theatre)
- Langdon Elwyn Mitchell's Becky Sharp (1929, as Lord Southdown at the Knickerbocker Theatre)
- Austin Strong and Lloyd Osbourne's The Little Father of the Wilderness (1930, as Lieutenant General Dulong at Empire Theatre)
- Howard Lindsay and Bertrand Robinson's Oh, Promise Me (1930-1931, as Judge Hawley at Morosco Theatre)
