= Barrie (name) =

Barrie is an English-language name, a variant spelling of Barry, and may refer to:

== People with the surname ==
- Barrie (surname)

== People with the given name ==
- Barrie Cook (1929–2020), English painter
- Barrie Lee Hall Jr. (1949–2011), American trumpeter
- Barrie Masters (1956–2019), English singer, frontman for the rock band Eddie and the Hot Rods
- Barrie Pettman, Baron of Bombie (1944–2017), British author, publisher, and philanthropist

== People with the nickname ==
- Barrington Barrie Hole (1942–2019), Welsh footballer
- Florence Barraclough Barrie Lambert (1871–1957), English physician and medical administrator

== See also ==
- Barrie, Ontario, a city in central Ontario, Canada
