= Barry O'Sullivan (disambiguation) =

Barry O'Sullivan is an Australian politician.

Barry O'Sullivan may also refer to:

- Barry O'Sullivan (baseball), in 1968 College World Series
- Barry O'Sullivan, character in Journey to the Seventh Planet

== See also ==
- Barry Sullivan (disambiguation)
