= The Blue Paradise =

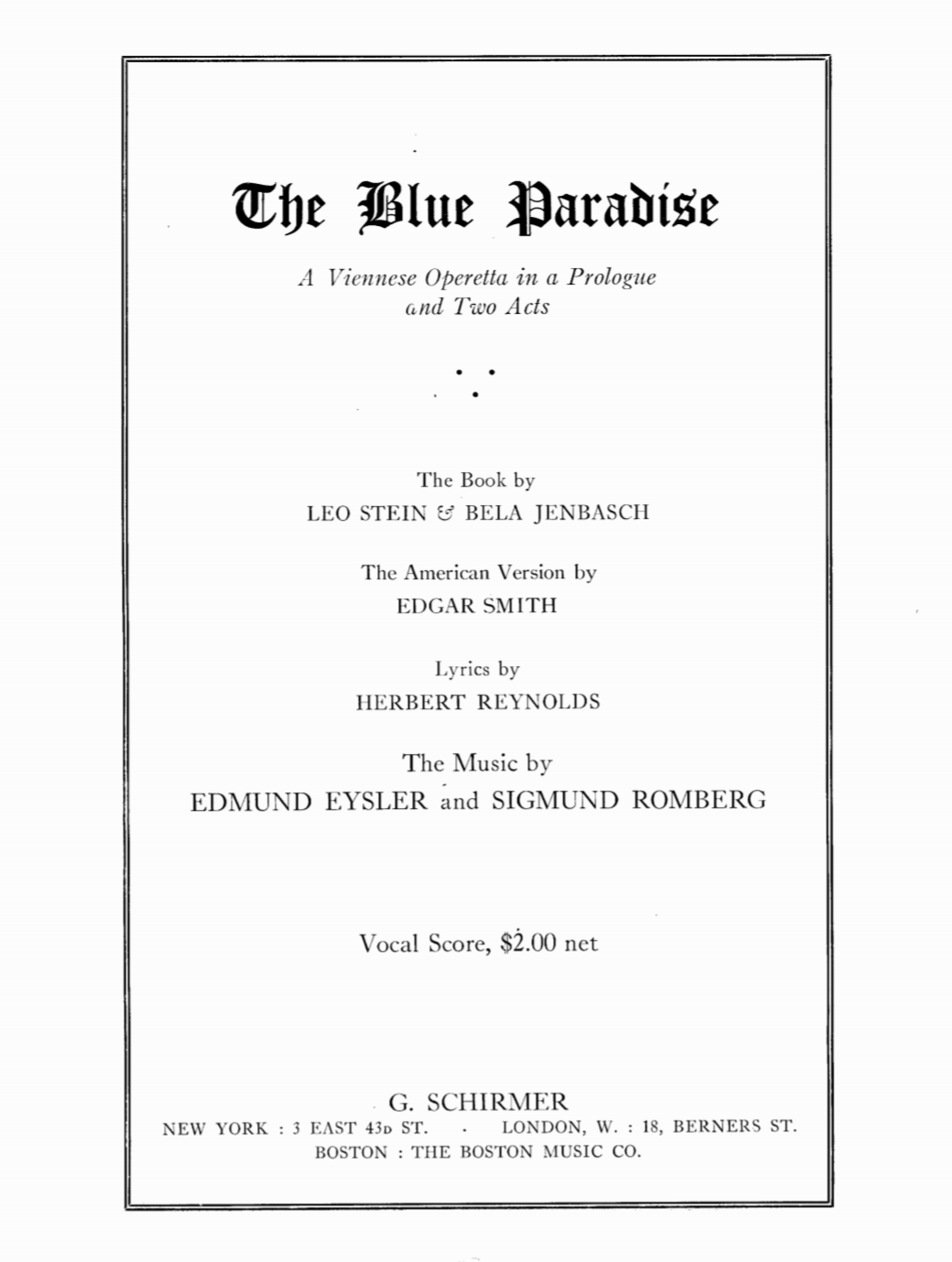
- Original vocal score
- Music: Sigmund Romberg and Edmund Eysler
- Lyrics: Herbert Reynolds
- Book: Edgar Smith
- Basis: Ein Tag im Paradies (Viennese operetta)
- Productions: 1915 Broadway

The Blue Paradise is a musical in a prologue and two acts, with music by Edmund Eysler, Sigmund Romberg and Leo Edwards, lyrics primarily by Herbert Reynolds, and a book by Edgar Smith, based on the operetta Ein Tag im Paradies (A Day in Paradise, 1913) by Eysler with original text by Leo Stein and Bela Jenbach. The story is set in a Viennese cafe, where a man realizes that he cannot recapture his long lost love.

The musical premiered on Broadway in 1915 and enjoyed a successful run. It introduced the song “Auf Wiedersehn”, Romberg's first song hit, originally sung by 18-year-old Vivienne Segal in her professional debut. As in his other early works, Romberg's contributions to this musical are strongly nostalgic, with an emphasis on the waltz as a symbol of the past. The show also includes newer American dance music and embraces the movement towards stage realism.

== Productions ==
The original Broadway production opened at the Casino Theatre on August 5, 1915 and ran for 356 performances, transferring to the 44th Street Theatre in May 1916. It was produced by the Shubert brothers, who asked Romberg to compose songs for the American adaptation of Eysler's opera. The show was directed by J. H. Benrimo and choreographed by Ed Hutchinson. Featured in the cast, besides Segal, were Cecil Lean, Cleo Mayfield, Ted Lorraine, Robert Pitkin, Frances Demarest and Teddy Webb.

The musical also played at The Muny Repertory in St. Louis in July 1932.

== Synopsis ==
Rudolph, a frequent customer at the Blue Paradise Inn in Vienna, is in love with Mizzi, a flower girl. He travels to America to operate one of his father's businesses. During the ensuing 24 years, Mizzi marries one of Rudolph's friends, and the couple has converted the inn into their private residence. After this period, when Rudolph returns to Vienna, and not knowing what has happened, he hopes to find Mizzi at the inn, to rekindle their love just as it had been so long ago, and to return to pre-war days. When he arrives at the inn, he sees that it looks just as he remembered it. He imagines that he has travelled back in time and embraces a woman who looks as Mizzi did in their youth. She turns out to be Mizzi's daughter, Gaby. Mizzi admits that she has arranged matters in this fashion so that Rudolph will accept reality; the past is the past. Gaby is engaged to Rudolph's nephew, Hans, and despite his sense of loss, Rudolph's is pleased for his nephew; the new generation will consummate the lost love of Rudolph's youth.

== Roles and original cast ==
- Mizzi, flower girl at the Blue Paradise Inn – Vivienne Segal
- Hans Walther – Robert G. Pitkin
- Rudolph Stoeger – Cecil Lean
- Mrs. Gladys Wynne – Frances Demarest
- Hazel James – Cleo Mayfield
- Justus Hampel – Teddy Webb
- Rudolph Oberdorher – Ted Lorraine

== Musical numbers ==
Prologue

- No. 1 - Overture
- No. 2 - Ensemble - “Here’s a toast to women’s eyes that guide the foolish and the wise”
- No. 3 - Drinking Song - Rudolph and Chorus - “When I’m with good fellows I never want to think of anything that’s sober”
- No. 4 - Stoeger and Chorus - “Come to its pretty garden all open to the day”
- No. 5 - Song and Chorus - “I used to be the Hello central girl, I was the best out on the west”
- No. 6 - Rudolph and Mizzi - “Let me hold you close to my heart, brush your tears away, dear”

Act I

- No. 7 - Chorus - “We wish you the pleasantest of journeys, sir, wherever you go from here”
- No. 8 - Rudy and Gaby - “Where you are there and I am here, a world of distance lies between us two”
- No. 9 - Stoeger, Hampel, Rudy and Walther - “Hallo, Justus! Hallo, Stoeger! Walther! Rudy! Hallo, Uncle!”
- No. 10 - Gladys and Chorus - “Let me begin by saying where I am staying - I want it, and get it, so let it warn you”
- No. 11 - Stoeger and Gladys - “Long ago I said I would never take a wife; I have no desire to spoil anybody’s life”
- No. 12 - Walther and Gladys - “When I see a loving couple anywhere, I just want to go and whisper: Have a care”
- No. 13 - Stoeger and Chorus - “Let me breathe the real Vienna air now; let me know that I am truly there now”

Act II

- No. 14 - Chorus - “Will someone please explain to us why we have been invited here, a private house”
- No. 15 - Comedy Folk Song - Rudy, Hampel and Chorus - “Now Heiny had a little dog what didn’t have no teet’”
- No. 16 - Folk Song and Yodle - Gladys - “I hear the cuckoo a-calling tonight: Oo-lay-eo, Oo-lay-eo”
- No. 17 - Walther and Hazel, with Chorus - “I think you’re perfection, you're quite a model girl”
- No. 18 - Waltz of the Season - Stoeger and Chorus - “Hark! Hark! Hark! What is it the orchestra’s playing?”
- No. 19 - Rudolph - “Most ev’ry foreign nation has a style of song creation”
- No. 20 - Stoeger and Gladys - “I’m dreaming of a wonderful night, night long ago”
- No. 21 - Finale Act II - “If you’d be a happy man, you’d better win a pretty widow”

Note: Items 2, 5, 6, 7, 10, 12, 14 & 17 were composed by Romberg, Items 4, 8, 9, 11, 13, 18, 20 & 21 were composed by Eysler; Items 3, 15 & 16 were composed by Leo Edwards; and Item 19 was written and composed by Cecil Lean.
