= When Dreams Come True (musical) =

1913 Broadway musical

When Dreams Comes True is a musical in three acts and four scenes with music by Silvio Hein and both book and lyrics by Philip Bartholomae.

== Plot ==
The plot of When Dreams Comes True centers around the playboy Kean Hedges who has recently been disinherited by his millionaire father after pursuing a scandalous relationship with a chorus girl in Paris. He is forced to sell his possessions in order to obtain enough money to book passage back home to New York City on the transatlantic steamship Kaiser; barely scraping together enough to pay for accommodations in steerage among the lowest class passengers. Now penniless, he falls in love with his "dream girl" from afar, a first class passenger named Beth, but can not bring himself to her attention for fear that his reduced circumstances will invite her scorn. Upon returning to New York City he sets out to reform his life and win back his father's approval and inheritance in order that his dreams might come true. He does and they do, but not without some misadventures along the way for both Kean and Beth. All ends happily with their impending wedding with Kean's father's blessing.

== History ==
When Dreams Comes True was created by Hein and Bartholomae as a starring vehicle for the actor and dancer Joseph Santley who both starred as Kean and choreographed the production. It was produced on Broadway by Bartholomae and was directed by Frank Smithson. The costumes were designed by B. Altman and Company and the sets were designed by Gates and Morange. It premiered at the Lyric Theatre on August 18, 1913. In the middle of its New York run it transferred to the 44th Street Theatre where it closed on October 11, 1913, after 64 performances. It then went on national tour.

Other cast members included Marie Flynn as Beth, May Vokes as Matilda, Anna Wheaton as Margaret Smith, Frazer Coulter as Jerome K. Hedges, Clyde Hunnewell as Griggs, Amelia Summerville as Mrs. William Smith, and Edward Garvie as Hercules Strong. Hein's wife, the actress Anna Mooney, was also in the cast as Mrs. Hopkins-Davis-Story.
