= The Heart Raider =

1923 film by Wesley Ruggles

- Directed by: Wesley Ruggles
- Produced by: Adolph Zukor; Jesse L. Lasky
- Starring: Agnes Ayres; Mahlon Hamilton; Charles Ruggles
- Cinematography: Charles Schoenbaum
- Production company: Famous Players–Lasky
- Distributed by: Paramount Pictures
- Release date: June 10, 1923
- Running time: 6 reels
- Country: United States
- Languages: Silent; English intertitles

The Heart Raider is a 1923 American silent romantic comedy film produced by Famous Players–Lasky and released by Paramount Pictures. It is based on an original story for the screen and was directed by Wesley Ruggles and starred Agnes Ayres and Mahlon Hamilton. A Czech release print survives at the George Eastman Museum, Rochester, New York.

Brothers Charles and Wesley Ruggles on a rare occasion work here on the same film. Future torch singer Helen Morgan has an uncredited extra part.

== Cast ==
- Agnes Ayres - Muriel Gray
- Mahlon Hamilton - John Dennis
- Charles Ruggles - Gaspard McMahon
- Marie Burke - Mrs. Dennis
- Charles Riegel - Jeremiah Wiggins

uncredited

- Fraser Coalter - Reginald Gray
- Helen Morgan - Extra

== Production ==
The Heart Raider was shot on location in Palm Beach, Florida.
