= Herald Square Theatre =

Former theatre in Manhattan, New York

Coordinates: 40°45′4″N 73°59′17.5″W

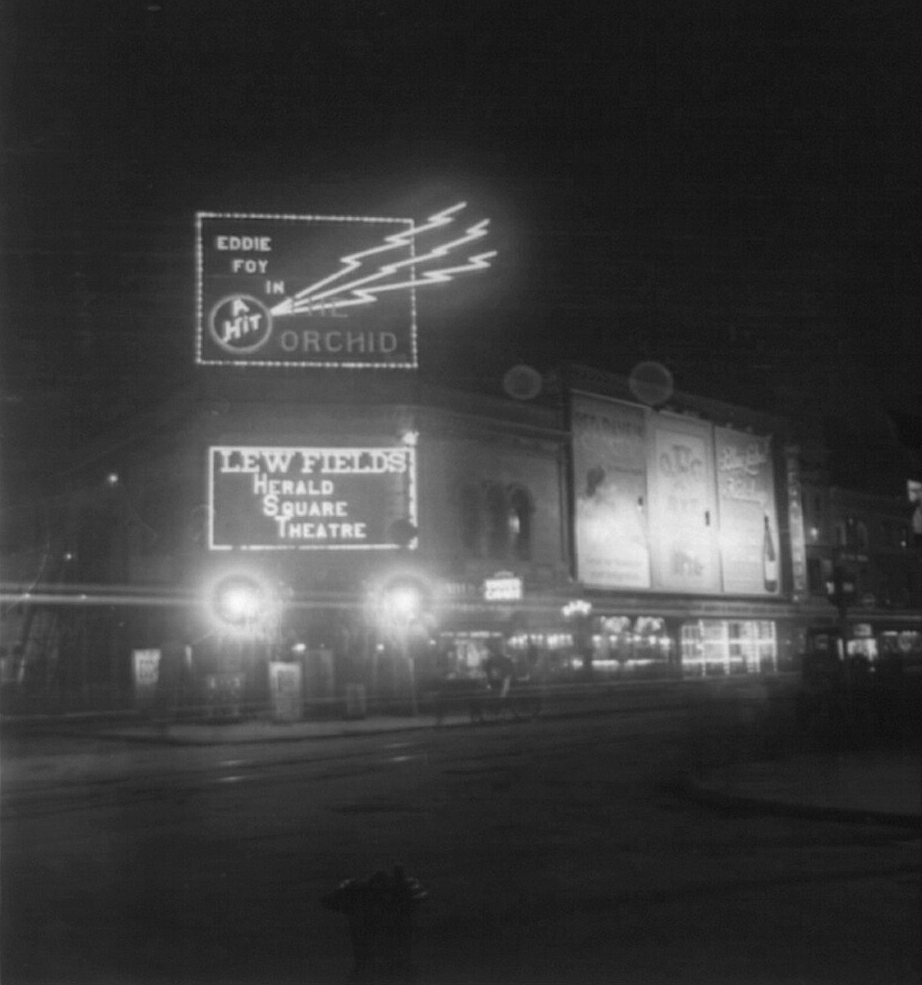
- Herald Square Theatre in 1907
- Interactive map of Herald Square Theatre
- Former names: (New) Park Theatre (1883–1894)
- Address: 1331 Broadway; New York City; United States
- Capacity: 1150
- Type: Broadway

Construction
- Opened: 1883
- Closed: 1914
- Demolished: 1915
- Years active: 1883–1914
- Architects: Rose & Stone

The Herald Square Theatre was a Broadway theatre in Manhattan, New York City, built in 1883 and closed in 1914. The site is now a highrise designed by H. Craig Severance.

== History ==
The Park Theatre opened in 1883 (also known as the New Park Theatre) on the partly demolished site of the Great New York Aquarium (1876–1881), which is unrelated to the later New York Aquarium. Actor Charles E. Evans, retiring from the stage with cash in hand from the long-running success of A Parlor Match, refurbished the prior Harrigan's Park Theatre as the Herald Square Theatre in 1894. It stood at 1331 Broadway, designed by architects Rose & Stone, with about 1150 seats and with its interior furnished by the interior of the nearby Booth's Theatre, which was being demolished. Lee Shubert took over the lease of the theatre in 1900, making it the first Broadway theatre owned by The Shubert Organization.

Partially destroyed by fire and rebuilt, in 1911 it became "the first New York theatre to be converted into a silent movie house", but it was demolished only three years later, as the Garment District expanded, and the Broadway theater district migrated north of 40th Street.

The theatre offered a variety of entertainment, from plays, like Shaw's Arms and the Man (1894), to Edwardian musical comedies, like The Girl from Kay's (1903–1904) and The Girl Behind the Counter (1907–1908), to operetta, like Reginald De Koven and Harry B. Smith's Rob Roy. It saw the first performance of the George M. Cohan song "You're a Grand Old Flag" in 1906, and it was also where William Randolph Hearst first saw and met his wife Millicent Willson during her appearance as a "bicycle girl" in 1897.

== Selected performances ==
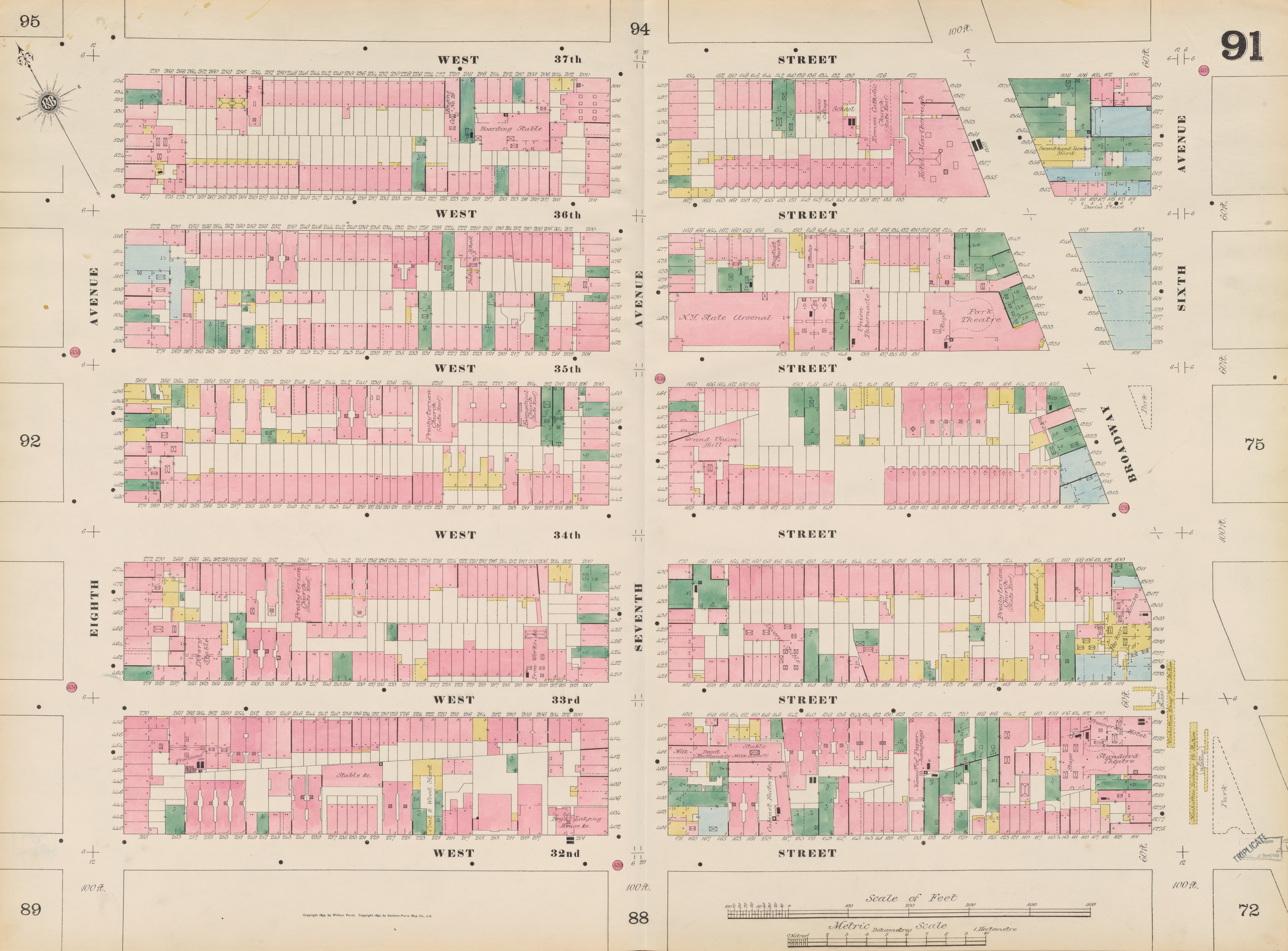
The Park Theatre, on a map published in 1890

- The Inspector (November 1890) (with Frazer Coulter)
- Arms and the Man (September 1894) (with Richard Mansfield)
- Napoleon Bonaparte (October 1894)
- Rob Roy (October 1894 - March 1895)
- Pudd'nhead Wilson (April 1895) (dramatized by Frank M. Mayo)
- The Heart of Maryland (October 1895 - March 1896) (by David Belasco)
- A Parlor Match (revival) (September 1896)
- The Mandarin (November 1896)
- The Girl from Paris (December 1896 - July 1897; August 1897)
- An Arabian Girl and 40 Thieves (April - May 1899)
- Arizona (September 1900 - January 1901)
- Dolly Varden (January 1902 - June 1902) (with Lulu Glaser)
- The Defender(July 1902 - August 1902) (with Blanche Ring)
- The Girl from Kays (November 1903 – May 1904; August–September 1904)
- The Rollicking Girl (May 1905 - October 1905)
- Coming Thro' the Rye (January 1906 - February 1906)
- George Washington Jr. (February 1906 - April 1906)
- Widower's Houses (March 1907)
- The Orchid (April 1907 - September 1907)
- The Girl Behind the Counter (October 1907 - June 1908)
- Three Twins (June 1908 - December 1908, closed due to fire)
- The Beauty Spot (April 1909 - August 1909)
- Tillie's Nightmare (May 1910 - July 1910)
