= Barry Richardson =

Barry Richardson may refer to:

- Barry Richardson (American football) (born 1986), American football offensive tackle
- Barry Richardson (Australian footballer) (born 1946), Australian rules footballer
- Barry Richardson (English footballer) (born 1969), English footballer
