= Barry Smit =

Canadian integrated geographer and IPCC contributor

Professor Barry Smit CM OOnt FRSC
- Born: Barry Edward Smit; 24 September 1948 (age 78); Auckland, New Zealand
- Citizenship: New Zealand; Canada
- Title: Professor Emeritus (Guelph)
- Awards: Queen Elizabeth II Diamond Jubilee Medal

Academic work
- Institutions: University of Guelph

Barry Edward Smit is a Canadian geographer who served as the Canada Research Chair in Global Environmental Change. His research focuses are largely on the interactions of agriculture and irrigation on the climate, as well as climate change adaptation, especially in arctic regions. He has been described by the Toronto Star as a "top scientist" and additionally by the Government of Canada's Social Sciences and Humanities Research Council (SSRC) as "a pioneer and world leader in research on the human impacts of climate change".

Smit is a Professor Emeritus at University of Guelph, Department of Geography. Smit's awards and honors including being inducted into both the Order of Ontario and the Royal Society of Canada, winning a Queen Elizabeth II Diamond Jubilee Medal, a Scholarly Distinction Award in Geography from the Canadian Association of Geographers, and the SSRC Gold Medal. Smit was also a co-recipient of the 2007 Nobel Peace Prize for his involvement with the Intergovernmental Panel on Climate Change.

In 2015, he appeared on The Agenda to describe the changing climate's effects on wine viticulture in Canada. He was also a scientist featured on CBC Radio's Quirks & Quarks.

Dr. Barry Smit was appointed to the Order of Canada for his contributions to understanding of climate change and for his mentorship of the next generation of climate change scientists. Smit was one of the first researchers in 1980 to study the effects of climate change.

His research has additionally been applied to study water resources in Chile.
