= Barry Evans (footballer, born 1963) =

Australian rules footballer

Personal information
- Born: 10 October 1963 (age 63)
- Original team: Reservoir Colts
- Height: 175 cm (5 ft 9 in)
- Weight: 77 kg (170 lb)

Playing career^{1}
Years	Club	Games (Goals)
1981	Collingwood	2 (3)
- ^{1} Playing statistics correct to the end of 1981.

Barry Evans (born 10 October 1963) is a former Australian rules footballer who played with Collingwood in the Victorian Football League (VFL).

Evans, a rover, came to Collingwood from Reservoir Colts and was just 17 when he was picked to make his first VFL debut in the seventh round of the 1981 season, having appeared in only three reserves games. Playing against South Melbourne, the debutant had 18 disposals and kicked two goals, as Collingwood won by 65 points. He also played against Essendon, at Waverley Park the following week.
