= Barry Williams =

Barry Williams may refer to:

- Barry Williams (politician) (1928–2005), British boilermaker, trade unionist, and Communist
- Barry Williams (spree killer) (1944–2014), British spree killer
- Barry Williams (athlete) (born 1947), British hammer thrower
- Barry Williams (actor) (born 1954), American actor
- Barry Williams (rugby league) (active 1990–96), professional rugby league footballer
- Barry Williams (rugby union) (born 1974), Welsh international rugby union player
- Barry Williams (skeptic) (1938–2018), Australian skeptic

== See also ==
- "The Barry Williams Show", a song by Peter Gabriel on his album Up
- Barrie Williams (1937–2018), Welsh football manager
