= Cleo Mayfield =

American actress (1898–1954)

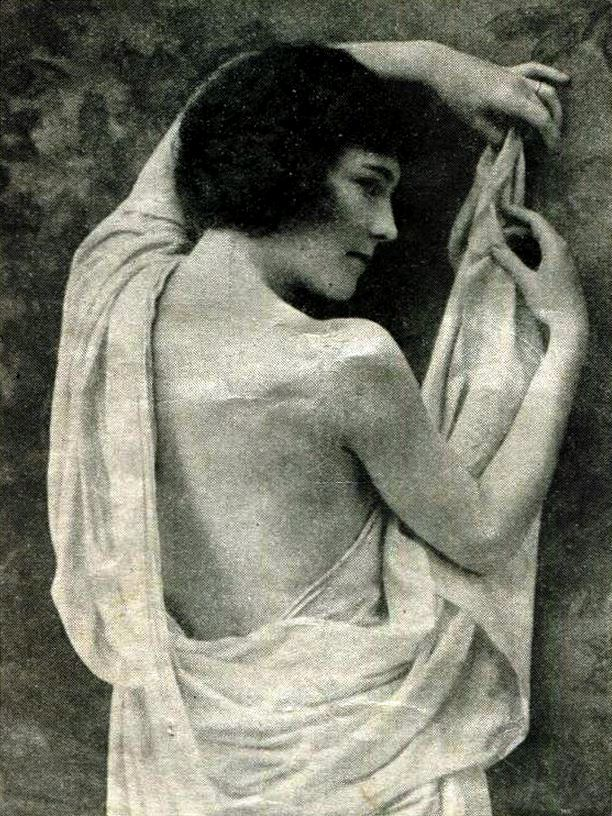
- Mayfield in 1922
- Born: Cleo Empey; August 6, 1898; Hutchinson, Kansas, U.S.
- Died: November 8, 1954 (aged 56); New York City, U.S.
- Resting place: Kensico Cemetery
- Occupation: Actress
- Years active: c.1912–1944
- Spouse: Cecil Lean (m. 1914)

Cleo Mayfield (born Cleo Empey; August 6, 1898 – November 8, 1954) was an American actress and singer.

== Biography ==
Mayfield was born Cleo Empey, the youngest daughter of Mr. and Mrs. Clarence B. Empey in Hutchinson, Kansas. As a child, she attended the North Side school in Hutchinson, before moving with her family to Kansas City, Missouri at the age of twelve.

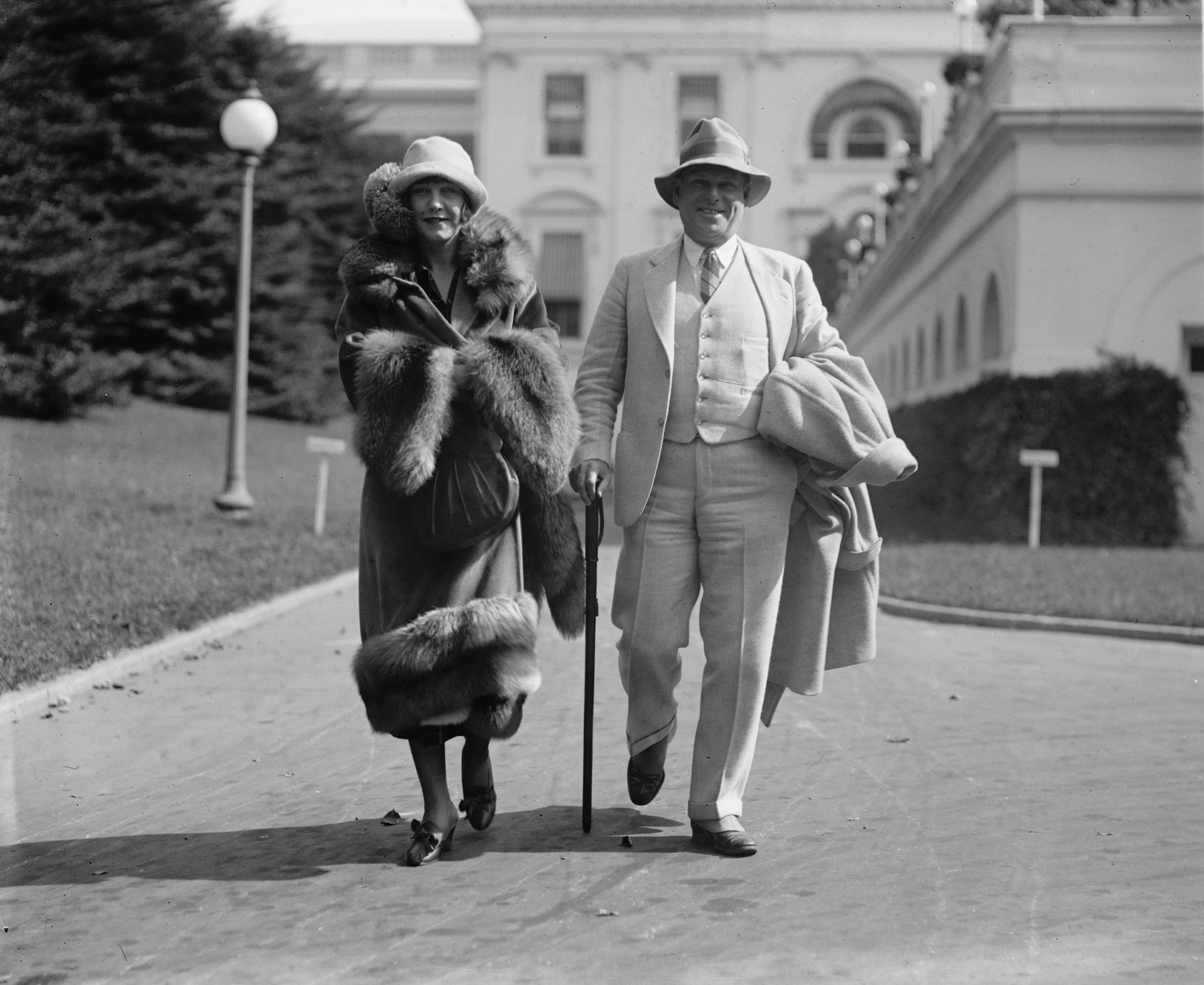
Mayfield with husband Cecil Lean in 1924

Mayfield first met Cecil Lean in Chicago in 1912, during the production of The Military Girl at the Ziegfeld Theatre. By 1913, she had assumed the stage name Cleo Mayfield. For the remainder of Lean's career, the two would frequently appear together in theatrical productions. In February 1914, Mayfield married Cecil Lean in a civil ceremony in Chicago. Prior to their marriage, Mayfield and Lean had been in a romantic relationship for over two years that only a few of their closest friends knew about. In July 1935, in the presence of Mayfield, Lean collapsed and died of an apparent heart attack in Manhattan. (Note: Contemporary newspaper accounts agree that Lean collapsed while walking outside a Manhattan theater; they variously identify that theater as either the Booth Theatre or the Plymouth Theatre.)

Over the course of her career, Mayfield made numerous appearances on Broadway stages and toured widely—as far afield as London—in a variety of musicals. Her Broadway appearances include productions of: The Man with Three Wives, The Blue Paradise, Miss 1917, Look Who's Here, The Blushing Bride, and Innocent Eyes. Her notable theatrical appearances away from Broadway include the touring production of No, No, Nanette that debuted in Detroit in January 1925.

Mayfield made her final Broadway appearance in 1944, in a comedy play called Right Next to Broadway. After a lengthy struggle with cancer, Mayfield died on November 8, 1954, at her residence in New York City at the Ansonia Hotel.
