= Barry Evans (footballer, born 1936) =

Australian rules footballer

Personal information
- Full name: Barry Evans
- Born: 6 February 1936 (age 90)
- Original team: Reservoir Colts
- Height: 178 cm (5 ft 10 in)
- Weight: 74 kg (163 lb)

Playing career^{1}
Years	Club	Games (Goals)
1956	South Melbourne	3 (1)
- ^{1} Playing statistics correct to the end of 1956.

Barry Evans (born 6 February 1936) is a former Australian rules footballer who played for the South Melbourne Football Club in the Victorian Football League (VFL).
