= Finbar =

Finbar or Finbarr, Finbarre, Finbarr's, and variants may refer to:

== Fictional characters ==
- Finbar, the shark character in the British stop motion children's show Rubbadubbers
- Finbarr "Rusty" Galloway, a character in the 2011 videogame L.A. Noire
- Finbar McBride, fictional character in the 2003 film The Station Agent
- Finbar McMullen, fictional character in the 1995 film The Brothers McMullen
- Finvarra (alternatively named Finbar or Fionnbharr), king of the Aos Sí in Gaelic folklore

== People ==
- Saint Finbar (550–620), Irish bishop
- Finbarr Clancy (born 1970), Irish musician
- Finbar Furey (born 1946), Irish musician
- Finbar Lynch (born 1959), Irish actor
- Finbar McConnell (born 1967), Irish Gaelic football player
- Finbar "Barry" McGuigan (born 1961), Irish boxer
- Finbarr Notte, Irish street artist known as Fin DAC
- Finbarr O'Reilly, Canadian photographer
- Finbar Wright (born 1957), Irish musician

== Places ==
- Saint Fin Barre's Cathedral, Cork, Ireland
- St. Finbar Catholic Church, Burbank, California, United States
- St. Finbarr's Cemetery, Cork, Ireland

== See also ==
- Finbar's Class, 1990's Irish teen drama series
- Finbarr Saunders, British comic strip
- Cathedral of Saint John and Saint Finbar, South Carolina, United States
- List of Irish-language given names
