= Barry Cottle =

American businessman

- Born: 1961 or 1962 (age 64–65)
- Education: Missouri State University (BA); Northwestern University (MA)
- Occupation: businessman
- Title: former CEO, Light & Wonder
- Term: 2018–2022
- Predecessor: Kevin Sheehan

Barry Cottle (born 1961 or 1962) is an American business executive, who was the CEO of Light & Wonder from 2018 to 2022.

== Early life ==
Cottle earned a bachelor's degree in information services and mathematics from Southwest Missouri State University, and an MBA from the Kellogg School of Management at Northwestern University.

== Career ==
Cottle joined Scientific Games in August 2015, as chief executive, SG Interactive.

In June 2018, Cottle, head of SG Interactive, was named as CEO of the parent company, replacing Kevin Sheehan.

In August 2022, Cottle resigned from Light & Wonder.
