= Barry Sullivan =

Barry Sullivan may refer to:

- Barry Sullivan (American actor) (1912–1994), US film and Broadway actor
- Barry Sullivan (stage actor) (1821–1891), Irish born stage actor active in Britain and Australia
- Barry Sullivan (lawyer), Chicago lawyer and the Cooney & Conway Chair in Advocacy at Loyola University Chicago School of Law
- Barry Sullivan (ice hockey) (1927–1989), ice hockey player in the National Hockey League
- Barry F. Sullivan, American investment banker and politician
- Barry K. Sullivan, the current Majority Floor Services Chief of the United States House of Representatives

== See also ==
- Barry O'Sullivan (disambiguation)
