= Let 'Em Eat Cake =

- Official Logo
- Music: George Gershwin
- Lyrics: Ira Gershwin
- Book: George S. Kaufman
- Basis: Sequel to Of Thee I Sing
- Productions: 1933 Broadway; 1994 BBC concert 2009 Opera North

Let 'Em Eat Cake is a 1933 Broadway musical with music by George Gershwin, lyrics by Ira Gershwin, and book by George S. Kaufman and Morrie Ryskind. A political satire, it tells the story of a fictional American president who fails to get reelected. Inspired by fascism in Europe, he and the former vice president decide to overthrow the government.

The sequel to the Pulitzer prize-winning Of Thee I Sing, a light-hearted comedy about the election of President Wintergreen, Let 'Em Eat Cake fell flat with audiences and critics when it opened in October 1933 due to its much darker tone. A review in TIME magazine panned the libretto for "[wandering] dreamily away into demented unreality" with its focus on revolution and dictatorship.

== Productions ==
The original Broadway production of Let 'Em Eat Cake opened October 21, 1933 at the Imperial Theatre, New York City and ran for 89 performances. The cast included William Gaxton as J.P. Wintergreen, Victor Moore as Alexander Throttlebottom, Philip Loeb as Kruger, and Lois Moran as Mary Wintergreen, all reprising their roles from Of Thee I Sing. The no longer extant orchestrations were by Edward B. Powell.

The show carried a message that audiences did not want to hear and it was a failure. However, it did have one hit song: "Mine". Several musical themes from Of Thee I Sing are reused in Let 'Em Eat Cake, including the Supreme Court Judges' song and the campaign song "Wintergreen for President", which includes parts of folk and patriotic songs such as Sousa's "Stars and Stripes Forever", and "Hail, Hail, the Gang's All Here".

In 1987, Let 'Em Eat Cake was performed in concert at the Brooklyn Academy of Music and subsequently recorded by Michael Tilson Thomas conducting the New York Choral Artists, the Orchestra of St. Luke's. and a cast of theatre singers, along with Of Thee I Sing.

A concert version of the show was performed on BBC Radio in 1994 (with a cast that included: Denis Quilley, Kim Criswell, Joss Ackland, Henry Goodman, and Louise Gold), and Opera North staged the show, along with a revival of Of Thee I Sing, during its 2008–9 season. The Opera North production was broadcast by BBC Radio 3 on Saturday, 26 September 2009, as part of its Opera on 3 series.

In 2019, the Orchestra of St. Luke's and the MasterVoices chorus performed a concert staging of Let 'Em Eat Cake at Carnegie Hall, conducted by Ted Sperling and a cast starring Bryce Pinkham.

In 2026, it was announced that New York City Center Encores! would be presenting Let 'Em Eat Cake in association with Opera Philadelphia, replacing the previously announced Hallelujah, Baby! to allow more time for creative development on the musical in a future season. It will be presented from March 17-28, 2027.

== Plot ==
=== Act I ===
President Wintergreen is up for reelection, but due to the continuing Great Depression, loses in a landslide to John P. Tweedledee. Wintergreen makes an unsuccessful appeal to the Supreme Court to overturn the election results. It is also revealed that Diana Deveraux divorced Throttlebottom to marry the French Ambassador. After the end of his term, Wintergreen, Throttlebottom, and their associates start a business selling his wife Mary's blue shirts on "Union Square." At Union Square, Kruger, an agitator, is proclaiming his doctrine "Down with Everything That's Up." After talking with Kruger, Wintergreen decides that to increase shirt sales they should promise a revolution or their money back, citing the European Brown Shirts and Black Shirts. With business now booming ("Shirts by Millions"), Mary appeals to the women to join the New Blue D.A.R. ("Climb up the Social Ladder") to increase female shirt sales. Wintergreen now needs the support of the Union League Club, because General Snookfield is a member. Throttlebottom persuades them by saying that the British are attacking Bunker Hill ("Comes the Revolution Reprise"). Having secured the Union League Club support, The Blue Shirts meet with Snookfield to plan the overthrow of the government ("On and On and On"). At nine o'clock on July 4, when the Blue Shirts arrive, Snookfield will give the signal for his soldiers to seize Tweedledee. On the Fourth, at the White House grounds, Tweedledee is giving a speech, when Snookfield leaves with Trixie for a party. The Blue Shirts arrive only to find the general is missing and the soldiers don't know what to do. Tweedledee promises the army a "dollar a day which (he) may not pay." Wintergreen promises the army the war debts owed by the League of Nations, which the soldiers accept. Tweedledee is deposed, and Wintergreen declares that "the land of freedom is free once more" ("Let 'Em Eat Cake").

=== Act II ===
The White House is being painted "Blue, Blue, Blue." The Supreme Court, now in chains, are brought before Wintergreen. He decides to show leniency because the Court officiated his marriage ceremony. The Court is reorganized into a baseball team. When the League of Nations arrives to discuss repayment of the war debts, they "No Comprenez, No Capish, No Versteh" when the issue is raised; only Finland repays their debt. Kruger, now head of the army following Snookfield's disgrace, is also putting pressure on Wintergreen to remember his promise. Wintergreen offers a solution where the debts will be settled by a baseball game for double or nothing. If the League loses, they will have another conference to discuss it. Kruger accepts the League's offer of Finland's money as a side bet. Throttlebottom hesitatingly accepts an offer to be the game's umpire. On the date of the ballgame the Supreme Ball Players, the League, and Kruger's army try to influence Throttlebottom to bend the rules their way.

The United States loses the game after a controversial call by umpire Throttlebottom. The soldiers want someone to be held to account for the loss, over Wintergreen and his associates' objections ("Oyez, Oyez, Oyez"). In the "Trial of Throttlebottom" a military tribunal is underway. Kruger, the Army, and the Ball Players call for Throttlebottom's execution claiming he conspired with the enemy. Wintergreen and his associates object, until the army levels the guns at them. Kruger and the army want to know when they are going be paid ("A Hell of a Hole"). After Wintergreen offers them a share of the shirt business, the army is going to take it all (Down With Everything That's Up—Reprise). Despite pleading he tried his best to get the money ("It Isn't What You Did"), Kruger sentences Wintergreen and his cronies to death by beheading. Mary and the condemned's wives enter and proclaim they are pregnant. Kruger says this may have worked four years ago during Wintergreen's impeachment hearings, but it doesn't work with the army. Trixie, who controls the Navy, arrives and joins forces with Kruger ("First Lady and First Gent"). Kruger proclaims "Let 'em Eat Caviar."

Execution day arrives, and in their jail cell Wintergreen, Throttlebotton, and the Committee discuss how they ended up in this situation. Next, the crowds gather to watch the executions ("Hanging Throttlebottom in the Morning"). A guillotine bought from France is unveiled, and Snookfield is shown to be the executioner. Since Throttlebottom is not married, he will be executed first. After a series of mishaps with the guillotine, Mary interrupts the proceedings. She presents a "Fashion Show" with dresses that arrived on the boat that brought the guillotine. After being reminded that the color of the revolution is blue, and they cannot wear the new fashions, the women revolt. Kruger objects, but the soldiers seize him after Trixie reminds them of an upcoming party.

Wintergreen tells the soldiers to shoot Kruger. When Kruger reveals he used to be in the dress making business, Wintergreen decides to go into business with him. Wintergreen decides to leave the revolution business and restores the republic and the Supreme Court. Tweedledee shows up and Wintergreen gives his vice-president, Throttlebottom, to him, since he can't remember his. Tweedledee declines the Presidency, since he is going to be President of Cuba. Throttlebottom is now the President. After Wintergreen promised the people cake and Kruger promised them caviar, Throttlebottom promises them pistachio ice cream, which he formerly detested.

== Songs ==
=== Act I ===
- Overture - Orchestra
- Opening Act 1
  - Wintergreen for President - Ensemble
  - Tweedledee for President - Ensemble
- Union Square Scene
  - Union Square - Ensemble
  - Down With Everyone Who's Up - Kruger and Agitators
- Store Scene
  - Shirts by Millions - Wives and Ensemble
  - Comes the Revolution - Alexander Throttlebottom and Ensemble
  - Mine - John P. Wintergreen, Mary Wintergreen and Ensemble
- Climb Up the Social Ladder - Mary Wintergreen, Wives and Ensemble
- Cloistered from the Noisy City (The Union League) - President of the Union League Club and Club Members
- Comes the Revolution (Reprise) - Union League Club
- On and On and On - John P. Wintergreen, Mary Wintergreen, and Company
- Finale Act 1
  - I've Brushed My Teeth - Gen. Adam Snookfield, U.S.A. and Dignitaries
  - On and On and On (Reprise) - Blue Shirts
  - The General's Gone to a Party - John P. Tweedledee, John P. Wintergreen, Lieutenant and Men
  - All the Mothers of the Nation - Mary Wintergreen, Wives and Girls
  - Yes, He's a Bachelor - John P. Wintergreen, Blue Shirts and Lieutenant
  - There's Something We're Worried About - Lieutenant, Army, Women, John P. Tweedledee and Kruger
  - What's the Proletariat? - Mary Wintergreen, Wives, Committee, Army and All
  - Let 'Em Eat Cake - John P. Wintergreen and Company

=== Act II ===
- Opening Act 2
  - Blue, Blue, Blue - Wives and Ensemble
  - Who's the Greatest? - John P. Wintergreen and Ensemble
- The League of Nations
  - No Comprenez, No Capish - League of Nations, John P. Wintergreen, Mary Wintergreen and Ensemble
  - Who's the Greatest? (Reprise) - John P. Wintergreen and Ensemble
- Ball Park Scene
  - Play Ball - Girls
  - When the Judges Doff the Ermine - President of the Union League Club and Blue Shirts
  - Up and at 'em - Ensemble
- Oyez, Oyez, Oyez - Soldiers and Spectators
- Trial of Throttlebottom
  - That's What He Did - Alexander Throttlebottom, Kruger and Ensemble
  - I Know a Foul Ball - Alexander Throttlebottom
  - Throttle Throttlebottom - Kruger and Ensemble
- Trial of Wintergreen
  - A Hell of a Hole (A Hell of a Fix) - John P. Wintergreen, Kruger and Soldiers
  - Down With Everyone Who's Up (Reprise) - Kruger and Ensemble
  - It Isn't What You Did - John P. Wintergreen and Ensemble
  - Mine (Reprise) - John P. Wintergreen, Mary Wintergreen and Ensemble
- Let 'Em Eat Caviar - Kruger and Ensemble (music missing)
- First Lady and First Gent - cut - replaces Caviar in modern performances
- Hang Throttlebottom in the Morning - Lieutenant and Ensemble
- Fashion Show - Ensemble
- Finale (Reprise of either Let 'Em Eat Cake or Of Thee I Sing) - Ensemble
