= Barry Moreland =

Australian dancer and choreographer

Barry Moreland is an Australian dancer and choreographer. He was born in Melbourne in 1943. He trained at the Australian Ballet School and in 1962 joined The Australian Ballet.
