= Floor Services Chief =

U.S. House of Representatives staff position

Floor Services Chief of United States House of Representatives
- Seal of the United States House of Representatives
- Incumbent; Timothy J. Harroun (Republican Cloakroom), Barry K. Sullivan (Democratic Cloakroom) since Appointed by Speaker John Boehner (Harroun), Speaker Nancy Pelosi (Sullivan)
- Office of the Speaker or Majority Leader
- Appointer: Speaker of the House or Majority Leader

Floor Services Chief is the title of the staff member in the speaker's or majority leader's office who runs the majority cloakroom in the United States House of Representatives. The current floor services chief for the Republican Cloakroom is Timothy J. Harroun, appointed by Republican Speaker John Boehner. The Democratic floor chief is Barry K. Sullivan, who was appointed by Democratic Speaker Nancy Pelosi. Sullivan's predecessor was Donald Anderson, who was appointed by Speaker Thomas P O'Neill. When Harroun is floor services chief, Sullivan is minority cloakroom manager. Similarly, when Sullivan was floor services chief, Harroun was minority cloakroom manager.

The position is informally known as the "cloakroom manager", as it has traditionally included responsibility for overseeing the operations of the majority party's cloakroom, such as the snack bar, telephones, and clothing storage.

== Added responsibilities, 2007–2010 ==
From the 2007 State of the Union Address through the 2010 State of the Union Address (i.e. the 110th and 111th Congresses), the floor services chief announced the entry of the:

- vice president and Senate
- dean of the diplomatic corps (or acting dean)
- chief justice of the United States and the associate justices
- the Cabinet

at each joint session of Congress that the president addressed (i.e., excluding the joint session for the counting of electoral votes).

When the president spoke at a joint session, the floor services chief and the House sergeant at arms together announced his presence, with the floor services chief loudly stating the phrase: "Madame Speaker" (this responsibility existed only under Speaker Nancy Pelosi), to which the sergeant at arms rejoined: "The President of the United States." (The announcement of the president has been solely the role of the House Sergeant at Arms since 2011, as it was before 2007, when Floor Services Chief Barry K. Sullivan was accorded the responsibility of uttering the first part by Speaker Pelosi.)

During the six joint meetings of Congress (bicameral gatherings at which the president did not speak, but at which a foreign head of state or head of government did) in the 110th and 111th Congresses, the floor services chief likewise announced all of the other persons listed above. Then, unlike in a joint session, the floor services chief alone performed the complete announcement of the foreign head of government, while the House sergeant at arms simply physically escorted the visiting dignitary to the speaker's rostrum.
