= Barry Joule =

Canadian writer

- Born: 1954 or 1955 (age 70–71)
- Occupation: Writer

Barry Joule (born 1954/1955) is a Canadian writer, and a long-time friend of the artist Francis Bacon who died in 1992 and left a substantial amount of his archive material to Joule. He was also a friend of the dancer Rudolf Nureyev and model Toto Koopman.

== Association with Francis Bacon ==
Joule, a Canadian journalist, used to live near to Bacon's home and studio at 7 Reece Mews, South Kensington, London, in 1978, when they met and became close friends.

Bacon asked Joule to destroy one of two paintings in his studio, saying that it was the "one on the left". Joule duly cut it from its frame and burnt it, only to receive a "furious" phone call some hours later at 4 am that he had burnt the wrong one (Bacon apparently had confused his left and right). As of 2018, the destroyed artwork would have been worth about £35 million.

In September 2019, Joule said that he was the model for Bacon's 1980s series of seven paintings depicting "a male torso and legs, naked except for sports shoes and cricket pads." In one of the paintings, Joule thought that he was recognisable, so Bacon painted out his head, "There, now I think you look much better this way – just the essentials here ... and absolutely no head to worry about. I hope you are happy now."

=== The Tate collection ===
In 2004, Joule donated more than 1,200 sketches, photographs and documents to the Tate, then estimated to be worth £20 million. Joule kept "a small number of items", and as of 2004 was planning to bequeath them to the Tate at some later date.

In August 2021, Joule threatened to cancel his gift to the Tate, saying that the gallery had failed to fulfill its pledges to mount exhibitions of the donated items. He also said that he could cancel a planned bequest to the Tate of a 1936 self-portrait and nine other Bacon paintings from the same period.

== Association with Rudolf Nureyev and Toto Koopman ==
Joule was a friend of the dancer Rudolf Nureyev, and moved into his Paris apartment in mid-September 1992 to help care for him. He was also friends with the model Toto Koopman, and inherited from both of them. Joule wrote Nureyev's obituary for The Independent.

== Appearances ==
In 2004, Joule appeared in the film Strange World of Barry Who?, directed by Margy Kinmonth. Soon after it was shown on BBC4, professional art thieves broke into his distinctive 15th-century home in Normandy, France, and stole a Bacon Pope painting worth about £8 million. Joule says that he had told the programme makers not to film the outside of his house or the painting for reasons of security, as it was too expensive to insure.

In 2017, he appeared in the film Francis Bacon: A Brush with Violence, directed by Richard Curson Smith.
