= The Inspector (play) =

The Inspector is a play by William Ranney Wilson. It opened at Broadway's Park Theatre on November 13, 1890. It closed on December 6, 1890. It starred Frazer Coulter in the title role.
