= The Barry Sisters (disambiguation) =

The Barry Sisters were an American vocal duo active from the 1950s–1970s

The Barry Sisters may also refer to:

- The Three Barry Sisters (active 1959–1960), an English trio that recorded two commissions of John Barry
- Barry Sisters (Australian band), an Australian country music duo, active 1950–1963
