= Barry C. Morgrage =

American politician

Member of the New Hampshire House of Representatives from the Hillsborough 8th district
- In office 1974–1976

Personal details
- Party: Democratic

Barry C. Morgrage is an American politician. He served as a Democratic member for the Hillsborough 8th district of the New Hampshire House of Representatives.
