= Barry Waldrep =

James "Barry" Waldrep (born November 18, 1962) is an American Bluegrass, Jam band, Americana instrumentalist, songwriter, composer and record producer. Main instrument is acoustic guitar, but also plays electric guitar, mandolin and banjo. Waldrep co-founded the bluegrass/jam band Rollin' In The Hay in July 1993. The band was based in Birmingham, Alabama, and formed as a side project. Waldrep was also a full time member of the Birmingham band Telluride. Rollin' In The Hay soon became a full-time band touring the Jam Band circuit of festivals and college campuses across the country until May 2009. The band produced 7 CDs and performed over 300 dates per year for 16 years.

During this time, Waldrep recorded 21 bluegrass tribute albums with CMH Records in Los Angeles for Eric Clapton, The Black Crowes, Widespread Panic, Phish, R.E.M., Tim McGraw, The Allman Brothers, Neil Diamond and others. He was also featured on the CD Masterworks of American Bluegrass also produced by CMH Records. At this point, Waldrep started recording solo records and doing tours & studio sessions with other artists.

September 2009, Zac Brown invited Waldrep to join him on his "Breaking Southern Ground Tour". Waldrep is featured on the Zac Brown Band Pass The Jar CD/DVD, along with Kid Rock and Little Big Town. During this time he met the husband and wife country duo Joey + Rory. He did a tour with them during the Zac Brown Tour, and in some cases, they all toured together. In addition, Waldrep played the Grand Ole' Opry several times and the Ryman Auditorium in Nashville, Tennessee, which was the previous home of the Grand Ole' Opry.

In January 2013, after landing a record deal with Singular Records in San Francisco, California, Waldrep began the Smoke From the Kitchen sessions, which is a bluegrass banjo/southern rock project. This project includes artists Chuck Leavell (Rolling Stones), Paul T. Riddle (Marshall Tucker Band), Oteil Burbridge (Allman Brothers), Charlie Starr (Blackberry Smoke), Coy Bowles (Zac Brown Band), Benji Shanks and Jazz Grass Mandolin player David "Dawg" Grisman.

In January 2016 Barry teamed up with singer songwriter Kelli Johnson to spend the year touring as a duo. During this year they released one CD "Hey Country (where are you now).

October 2016, Barry announces he will be touring with Country Artist John Berry as a member of his band on Johns 2016 Christmas tour.

January 2017, Barry Waldrep and friends began performing their fusion of Bluegrass/Southern Rock with special guest vocalists. The band is Barry (Electric and Acoustic Guitar, Mandolin & Banjo), Jason Bailey (Mandolin), Caelan Berry (Drums) & Bryan Hall (Upright Bass). Guest vocalists include Jimmy Hall (Wet Willie, Jeff Beck, Hank Williams Jr), Donna Hall & Joe Debrow.

2018, Barry continues with his own band, and their shows have been called by fans as a "SOUTHERN CULTURE REVIVAL". Waldrep states that this branding is the result of just being who we are. "No matter what we play it's gonna sound southern".

He and his band mates are all natives of Georgia or Alabama and have musical influences from Bluegrass, Jazz, Southern Rock and Gospel.

2019 - 2022, Barry is spending a lot of time in the studio recording for other artists. In addition he produced and recorded a tribute to the late guitarist Tony Rice which was recorded at the Nutthouse in Muscle Shoals, Alabama called Barry Waldrep & Friends Celebrate Tony Rice. (Released December 2021) Barry states that this is his favorite place to record.

The artists included on this project are Vince Gill, Radney Foster, Warren Haynes, Rodney Crowell, Mike Farris, Larry Campbell, Teresa Williams, John Berry, Jimmy Hall, Kelli Johnson, Donna Hall, Jacob Bunton, Darrell Scott, Patrick Simmons, John Paul White, Rory Feek, John Cowan, Kim Richey, John Jorgenson, Marty Raybon, Jim Lauderdale, Emmylou Harris, Tammy Rogers, Aubrey Haynie, Oteil Burbridge, Jason Bailey, Bryn Davies, Heidi Feek, Dillon Hodges, James "Hutch" Hutchinson, Spooner Oldham, Scott Vestal, Benji Shanks, Andrea Zonn.

== Early years ==
Barry Waldrep (Son of James & Barbara Waldrep) grew up in Randolph County Alabama. James was a professional auto mechanic, and a part-time bluegrass musician. Barbara worked in the manufacturing industry. The family vacations were most every weekend as they performed on the southeastern bluegrass festival circuit.

Barry graduated from Randolph County High School - Wedowee, Alabama in 1982. After a short term at Jacksonville State University, he moved to Auburn, Alabama to start classes at Auburn University, but started a band instead. With several day jobs in the middle of all the club shows, he decided to make music a full-time job in 1988. His first stint at being a full-time musician started with a 3-month house gig at a beach club in Panama City Beach, Florida. Barry Was used to performing on the bluegrass festival circuit with his fathers band where people attended events to hear the music. The club owner in Panama City, wanted a band to make people dance and drink, so the summer gig only lasted a week. Determined to succeed, Waldrep hit all the clubs and landed another gig. The band quickly revamped the set list, and made it through the summer.

The next 5 years were filled with road side honky tonks & college bar gigs with various bands until 1993 when he started Rollin' In The Hay.

== Personal life ==
Spouses

Julie Russell (1986 - 1987), Rhona Leavitt (1996 - 2007), Lesia Williams (2014–Present)

Children

Mallorie McGue (Step Daughter), Morgan McGue (Step Daughter)

== Banjo.com ==
In addition to touring, Barry purchased the 12 year old musical instrument company banjo.com in May 2015.

== Smoke from the Kitchen lineup ==
The lineup on Smoke from the Kitchen includes: Banjo, Mandolin & Acoustic Guitar: Barry Waldrep, Bass: Oteil Burbridge (Allman Brothers Band), Drums: Paul Riddle (The Marshall Tucker Band), Hammond: Coy Bowles (The Zac Brown Band), Electric Guitar, Acoustic Guitar: Charlie Starr (Blackberry Smoke), Electric Guitar, Resonator Guitar: Benji Shanks (Captain Soularcat/Last Waltz Ensemble), Mandolin: David Grisman (Jerry Garcia, Peter Rowan), Keyboards: Chuck Leavell (Allman Brothers Band and Rolling Stones), Vocals: Paris Luna, Aaron Trubic (Sean Costello Band)

== Toured and/or recorded with ==
Zac Brown Band - Randy Travis - Joey & Rory - Jimmy Hall - John Cowan - John Berry - Darrell Scott - Rodney Crowell - Marty Raybon - Mike Farris - Kim Richey - Warren Haynes - Oteil Burbridge - Charlie Starr - Chuck Leavell - David Grisman - Vince Gill - Radney Foster - Teresa Williams - Larry Campbell - Jim Lauderdale - Patrick Simmons - John Paul White - John Jorgenson - Rory Feek - Donna Hall - Emmylou Harris - Tammy Rogers - Spooner Oldham - Andrea Zonn - Dillon Hodges - Kelli Johnson - Scott Vestal - Aubrey Haynie - Caelan Berry - Bryan Hall - Jason Bailey - Bryn Davies - Benji Shanks, James "Hutch" Hutchinson - Heidi Feek - Jacob Bunton - Paul T. Riddle - Coy Bowles - Paris Luna - Sol Junky - Kurt Thomas - Nic Cowan AKA Nico Moon - Sonia Leigh - Levi Lowry - Sarah Peacock - Lynam - Wayne Mills Band - Caddle - Rock Killough - Brandon Perry - Andrea Frankle

== Concert Promoting ==
Barry has hosted and promoted many festivals and concerts in the Alabama and Georgia region. Acts include John Berry, Jimmy Hall, The Kentucky Headhunters, Confederate Railroad, Wet Willie, The Marshall Tucker Band, Flatt Lonesome, Sarah Peacock and many others.

== 48 West ==
In June 2023 Barry opened 48 West, a listening room venue in his home town of Wedowee, Alabama. A place where he performs as well as presenting national artists he has met or performed with throughout his career.

== Overview ==
- Origin: Randolph County Alabama
- Genres: Bluegrass, Jam Band, Americana, Southern Rock
- Years Active: 1969 – Present
- Labels: CMH Records, Singular Records, Delta Grass Records
- Associated Acts: Zac Brown Band, Allman Brothers Band, Marshall Tucker Band, Blackberry Smoke, Joey & Rory, Randy Travis

== Discography ==
Bluegrass Tributes

- Widespread Panic / 1998
- Phish / 1998
- The Allman Brothers Band / 1998
- REM / 1998
- String Cheese Incident / 1999
- Black Crowes / 1998
- Eric Clapton / 1999
- Neil Diamond / 1999
- Tim McGraw / 1998
- Travis Tritt / 1999
- Alan Jackson / 1999
- Jo Dee Messina / 2000
- Lee Ann Womack / 2000
- Brooks & Dunn / 2000
- Master Works of American Bluegrass / 2000

Barry Waldrep Projects

- Barry Waldrep / Steel Rails / 1997
- Barry Waldrep / The Muscle Sholes Sessions / 2002
- Barry Waldrep / Acoustic Stew / 2007
- Barry Waldrep / Band of Brothers & Sisters / 2011
- Barry Waldrep & Jacob Bunton / Six Ways Til Sunday / 2005
- Barry Waldrep / Smoke From The Kitchen / 2014

Rollin' In The Hay

- Rollin' In The Hay / Badass Bluegrass / 1993
- Rollin' In The Hay / Live At Oasis / 1994
- Rollin' In The Hay / Renegade Bluegrass / 1996
- Rollin' In The Hay / Self Titled / 1998
- Rollin' In The Hay / Live At Oasis 2 / 1999
- Rollin' In The Hay / Live At The Flora-Bama / 2000
- Rollin' In The Hay / Live At The War Eagle Supper Club / 2000
- Rollin' In The Hay / Tribute to Brother Cane / 2002

Guest Appearances

- Paris Luna / Between The Ditches / 2011
- Sol Junky / Dead & Gone / 2011
- Kurt Thomas / Front Porch Swing / 2010
- Nic Cowan / Cheap Wine / 2010
- Sonia Leigh / 1978 December / 2011
- Levi Lowery / Self Titled / 2010
- Chris Scott / Hard Livin' / 2003
- Sarah Peacock / Live / 2011
- Sarah Peacock / Albuquerque Sky / 2012
- Lynam / Bling Bling / 2001
- Wayne Mills Band / Bad Man / 2002
- Donna Hall / It's Never Too Late / 2002
- Caddle / Raise'em High / 2008
- Sol Junky / Dead & Gone / 2011
- Rock Killough / Impressions/ 1996
- Runaway Coal Train / Self Titled / 2008
- Jason Bailey / Southwood / 2003
- Andrea Frankle / Self Titled / 1998
- Brandon Perry / Shades of Gray / 2010
- Zac Brown Band / Pass the Jar / 2009
- Randy Travis / 25th Anniversary Celebration / 2011
- Joey & Rory / Album #2 / 2010
- Breaking Southern Ground / 2010
