= Cecil Lean =

American actor (1878–1935)

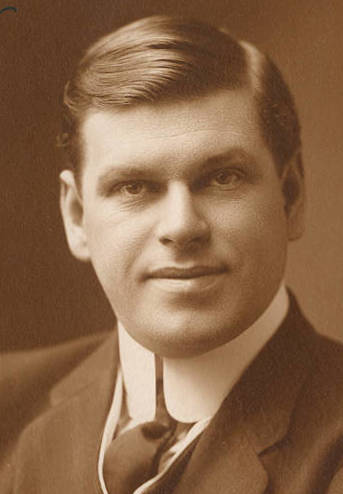
- Lean in 1911
- Born: Cecil Worthington Starr Lean; July 7, 1878; London, Ontario, Canada
- Died: July 18, 1935 (aged 57); New York City, U.S.
- Occupations: Actor; singer; composer
- Spouses: Florence Holbrook (m. 1902; div. 1913) Cleo Mayfield (m. 1914)

Cecil Worthington Starr Lean (July 7, 1878 – July 18, 1935) was a Canadian-American actor, lyricist, composer, and singer.

== Biography ==
Cecil Lean was born in London, Ontario, the son of John Udie Lean. As a child, Lean moved with his father to Detroit, Michigan where he began his acting career at the age of 13. At age 19, Lean moved to Chicago, where he rose to prominence acting in a string of musical comedies at the La Salle Theater.

Lean married actress Florence Holbrook in a ceremony at the Little Church Around The Corner in Manhattan on September 21, 1902. The two were widely known as "Lovey" and "Dovey" respectively, and the two made a pact to only perform together. The couple separated in 1910, and by 1912, reports had surfaced that the couple were remaining married "for business reasons only". After three previous instances of divorce proceedings were dismissed, the couple divorced in late 1913.

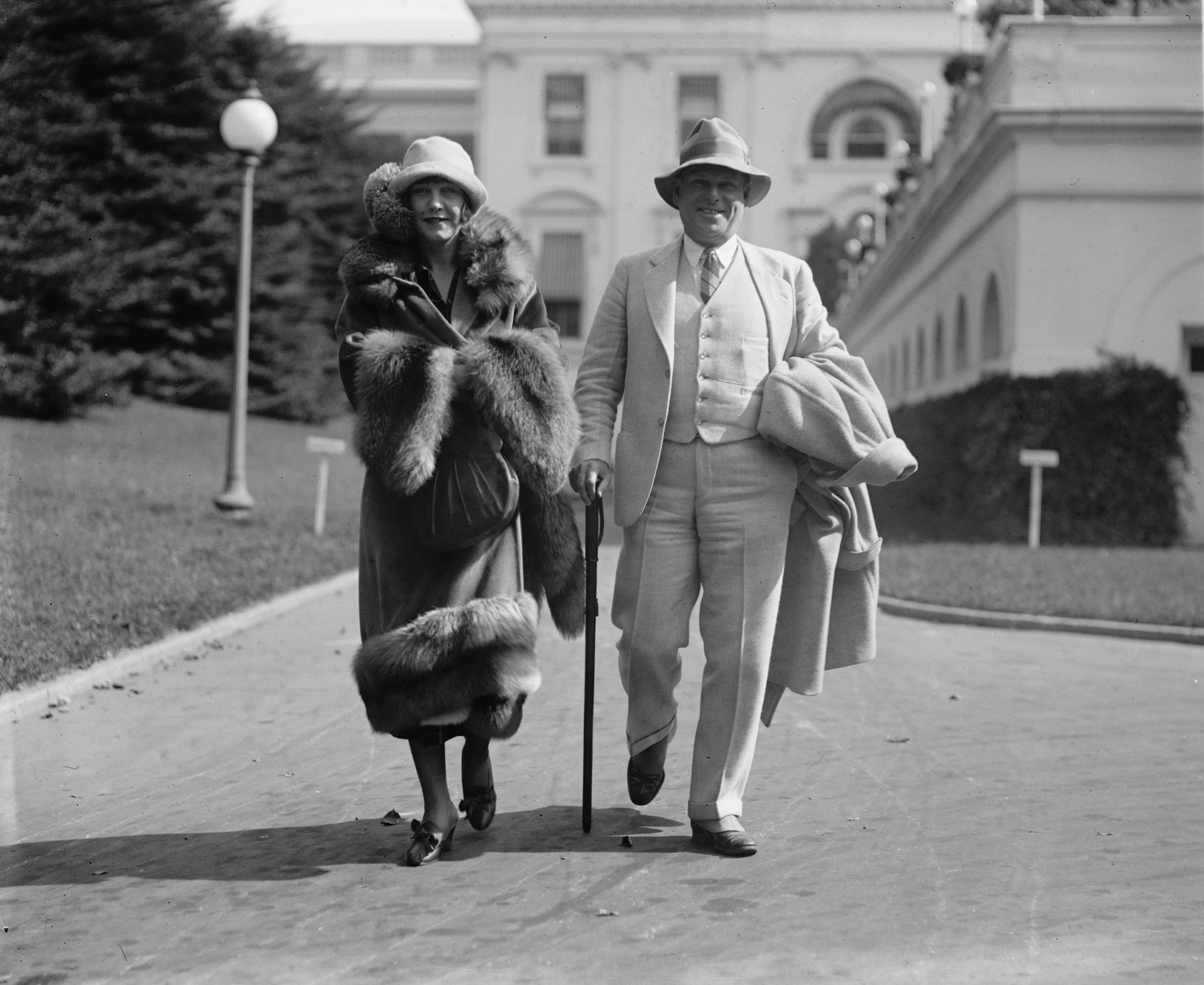
Lean with his second wife, Cleo Mayfield, in 1924

Lean first met actress Cleo Mayfield in Chicago in 1912, during the production of The Military Girl at the Ziegfeld Theatre. For the remainder of his career, the two would frequently appear together in theatrical productions. In February 1914, Lean married Mayfield in a civil ceremony in Chicago. Prior to their marriage, Lean and Mayfield had been in a romantic relationship for over two years that only a few of their closest friends knew about.

Lean's Broadway appearances include productions of: The Soul Kiss, Bright Eyes, The Man with Three Wives, The Blue Paradise, Miss 1917, Look Who's Here, The Blushing Bride, Innocent Eyes, and Everybody's Welcome. In addition to his credits as a performer, Lean was credited as providing additional lyrics to the aforementioned productions of Bright Eyes and Look Who's Here and both additional lyrics and additional music to the aforementioned production of The Blue Paradise. In the course of his acting career, Lean was frequently associated with producer, Flo Ziegfeld. In addition to his career on-stage, Lean was a well-known radio comedian.

On July 18, 1935, in the presence of Mayfield, Lean collapsed and died of an apparent heart attack in Manhattan. (Note: Contemporary newspaper accounts agree that Lean collapsed while walking outside a Manhattan theater; they variously identify that theater as either the Booth Theatre or the Plymouth Theatre.)
