= Gershwin (disambiguation) =

George Gershwin (1898–1937), American composer, author of famous works such as Rhapsody in Blue and An American in Paris.

Gershwin may also refer to:

== People ==
- Ira Gershwin (1896–1983), brother of George Gershwin, American lyricist, author of famous works such as I Got Rhythm and They Can't Take That Away from Me
- Arthur Gershwin (1900–1981), brother of George Gershwin, American composer
- Frances Gershwin (1906–1999), sister of George Gershwin, American violinist, singer, performer, and painter, after marriage known as Frances Godowsky
- Gershwin A. Drain (born 1949), American federal judge
- Lisa-ann Gershwin, American biologist and author

== Other ==
- 8249 Gershwin, an asteroid
- Gershwin operating system, a planned follow-on to the Copland operating system for Apple Computer
- Gershwin Prize, an award given by the US Library of Congress to a composer or performer for their lifetime contributions to popular music
- Gershwin Theatre, a Broadway theatre in the United States
