= Hambitzer =

Hambitzer is a surname. Notable people with the surname include:

- Charles Hambitzer, American composer, pianist, and teacher
- Joseph F. Hambitzer, American politician and lawyer
