= Leopold Godowsky Jr. =

American violinist and chemist (1900–1983)

Leopold Godowsky Jr. (/ɡəˈdɔːfski, ɡɔː-/; May 27, 1900 – February 18, 1983), the oldest son of the famous pianist and composer Leopold Godowsky, was an American violinist and chemist, who together with Leopold Mannes created the first practical color transparency film, Kodachrome.

== Beginning ==
Mannes and Godowsky's experimentation with color photography began in 1917, after seeing the film Our Navy in Prizma Color, which was advertised as a color film. Because of the low quality the boys felt cheated and decided to do something about it. They designed a movie camera and projector each with three lenses covered by orange-red, green and blue-violet filters. They took multiple black-and-white exposures and projected them back through the filters. They patented this system, but it was not a commercially viable process.

== Personal life ==
Godowsky studied violin at UCLA and became a soloist and first violinist with the Los Angeles Philharmonic and the San Francisco Symphony Orchestras. He also enrolled at UCLA to study physics and chemistry. He performed jointly with his father, Leopold Godowsky, one of the great pianists of the early twentieth century, using a rare Cremonese violin by Giuseppe Guarneri del Gesù, the 1734 "Prince Doria". Godowsky Jr married Frances Gershwin, sister of George and Ira Gershwin, who became a recognized painter and sculptor. Their son, Leopold Godowsky III, was also a concert pianist. By 1922, Godowsky had given up his orchestral jobs in California and moved back to New York City where he and Mannes worked as musicians. They experimented with color photography during their spare time.

== Discovery ==
While on his way to perform in Europe in late 1922, Mannes made the chance acquaintance of a senior partner in the investment firm of Kuhn, Loeb and Co. and described their progress with color photography. Some months later the firm sent one of their junior associates, Lewis L. Strauss to the Mannes apartment to view the color process. The final results were impressive enough for Kuhn Loeb to invest in the process.

== Development of color process ==
With financial backing, Godowsky and Mannes built a dedicated laboratory and in 1924 took out additional patents on their work. In 1930 Eastman Kodak was so impressed with the results that they contracted them to move to Rochester and take advantage of Kodak's research facilities.

By 1935, Godowsky and Mannes and the Kodak research staff had developed a marketable subtractive color film for home movies. Kodachrome film was coated with three layers of ordinary black-and-white silver halide gelatin emulsion, but each layer was made sensitive to only one-third of the spectrum of colors—in essence, to red, green or blue. Special processing chemistry and procedures caused complementary cyan, magenta or yellow dye images to be generated in these layers as the black-and-white silver images were developed. After they had served their purpose, the silver images were chemically removed, so that the completed chromogenic film consisted solely of the three layers of dye images suspended in gelatin. [This is only partially accurate. All three layers were sensitive to blue light. The topmost layer was coated onto a "Carey-Lea silver" "filter" layer, which was a blue-light absorbing layer. This prevented blue light from reaching the two lower layers. It transmitted both red light and green light. The layer closest to the support was sensitive to both blue and red light. That is where the red light information was recorded. The layer above it was sensitive to both green and blue light. The top-most layer recorded the blue light information.

Kodachrome 16mm movie film was released for sale in 1935, and in 1936 Kodachrome 35mm still and 8mm movie film were released.

Technicolor Monopack, a 35mm version of Kodachrome Commercial (originally a specialized 16mm low-contrast camera film intended for principal photography and not for direct projection) later became the first single-strip three-color film suitable for professional applications (when combined with Technicolor's proprietary dye-transfer printing process) and Monopack was used on several complete productions (and numerous second units) until it was replaced by Eastmancolor negative film in the 1950s. Three-strip Technicolor was itself replaced by Eastmancolor negative in 1955.

== Later life and legacy ==
Godowsky was awarded the Edward Longstreth Medal in 1940.

He died at his apartment on the Upper East Side of Manhattan on February 18, 1983.

Godowsky and Mannes were inducted into the National Inventors Hall of Fame in 2005.

The Photographic Resource Center at Boston University has a biennial award for Color Photography named in honor of Leopold Godowsky Jr.

== Patents ==
- U.S. patent 1,997,493 Color Photography filed January 1922, issued April 1935
- U.S. patent 2,304,940 Color Photography filed January 1940, issued December 1942
