= Westchester Hills Cemetery =

Cemetery in Westchester County, New York

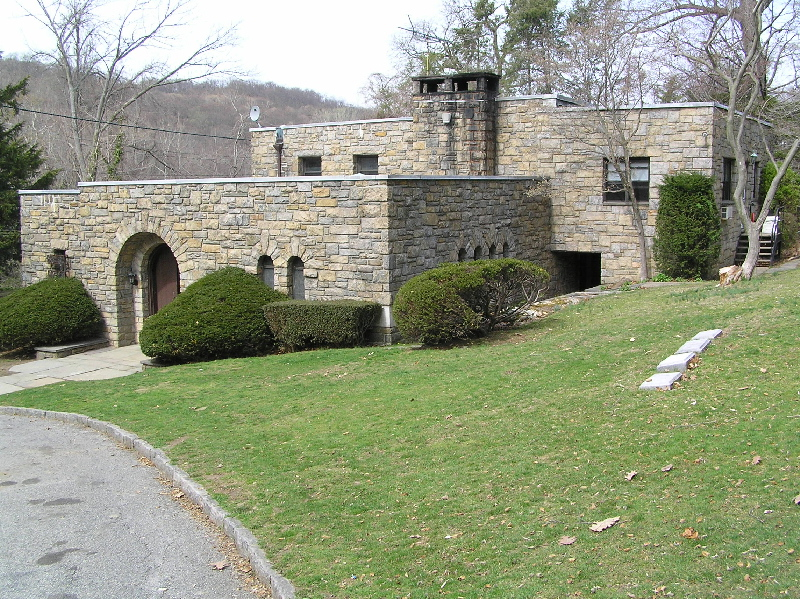
- Main office of Westchester Hills Cemetery
- Interactive map of Westchester Hills Cemetery

Details
- Established: 1919
- Location: 400 Saw Mill River Road, Hastings-on-Hudson, New York, US
- Country: United States
- Coordinates: 40°59′32″N 73°51′36″W
- Type: Jewish
- Owned by: Stephen Wise Free Synagogue
- Find a Grave: Westchester Hills Cemetery

The Westchester Hills Cemetery is at 400 Saw Mill River Road in Hastings-on-Hudson, Westchester County, New York, approximately 20 miles (32 km) north of New York City. It is a Jewish cemetery, and many well-known entertainers and performers are interred there. It was founded in 1919 when the Stephen Wise Free Synagogue acquired the northern portion of the Mount Hope Cemetery.

== Notable interments ==
- Barricini family, boxed candy makers
- Charles E. Bloch (1927–2006), President Bloch Publishing Company
- Barbara Bradford (1933–2024), novelist
- Mischa Elman (1891–1967), violinist
- I. J. Fox (1888–1947), notable furrier
- Joyce Pinn Fox (1931–2020), banking executive
- Captain George Fried (1877–1949), won Navy Cross for rescue of ships Antinoe, and Florida
- Stanley P. Friedman (1925–2006), writer
- John Garfield (1913–1952), actor
- George Gershwin (1898–1937), composer
- Ira Gershwin (1896–1983), lyricist
- Jonah Goldman (1906–1980), baseball player
- Ben Grauer (1908–1977), television and radio personality
- Guggenheim family, founders of the Guggenheim Museum
- Sidney Hillman (1887–1946), first president of Amalgamated Clothing Workers of America
- Judy Holliday (1921–1965), actress
- Allyn King (1899–1930), Broadway actress and former Ziegfeld Follies performer
- Richard Lindner (1901–1976), German-American painter
- Lucille Lortel (1900–1999), actress and producer
- Arnold Newman (1918–2006), photographer
- Roberta Peters (1930–2017), opera singer
- Tony Randall (1920–2004), actor
- Max Reinhardt (1873–1943), producer and director
- Billy Rose (1899–1966), Broadway producer
- A. M. Rosenthal (1922–2006), Pulitzer Prize–winning journalist
- Robert Rossen (1908–1966), motion picture director and screenwriter
- Ron Silver (1946–2009), American actor, director, and producer
- Lee Strasberg (1901–1982), actor-teacher
- Paula Strasberg (1909–1966), actress-teacher
- Irving Sturm (1932–2010), founder of Iridium Jazz Club and Ellen's Stardust Diner
- Maxine Sullivan (1911–1987), American jazz vocalist and performer
- David Susskind (1920–1987), Emmy award-winning producer
- Laurence Tisch (1923–2003), head of CBS and co-founder of Loews, brother of Preston
- Preston Robert Tisch (1926–2005), financier and business magnate, brother of Laurence
- Rabbi Stephen Wise (1874–1949), religious leader
- Louise Waterman Wise (1874–1947), social worker and artist, wife of Stephen Wise
- Alexandra Pregel (1907–1984), Russian-American artist
- Boris Pregel (1893–1976), scientist-physicist
- Bella Rosenfeld (1889-1944) first wife of Marc Chagall
