= Arthur Gershwin =

American composer and stockbroker (1900–1981)

Arthur Gershwin (March 14, 1900 – November 19, 1981) was one of the four Gershwin family siblings of American musical fame. Although he was a composer, he was not a professional musician, and made his living as a stockbroker.

He was born in New York City and was the third of the four Gershwin siblings. His siblings were Ira, George, and Frances.

== Notable compositions ==
Arthur composed the two-act musical A Lady Says Yes (1945), which is set in 1545 and 1945 and takes place in Venice, Washington D.C., and China. It ran on Broadway from January 10 to March 25, 1945, at the Broadhurst Theatre and had 87 performances.

His song "Invitation to the Blues" with lyrics by Doris Fisher, was used in the film Tootsie (1982) and has been recorded by Julie London.

== Family ==
He married Judy Lane, a singer with the Xavier Cugat Orchestra, in the 1940s, and had one child; Marc George Gershwin, who is a trustee of the George Gershwin Trust, along with his sons Adam, Todd, and Alex Gershwin.

Arthur said in a 1972 interview with Robert Kimball and Alfred Simon that when he was a child, he was George's pal and went around with him more than Ira did.

Frances said of Arthur that he played by ear and "his rhythm wasn't that great." She used to tease him. "He was really very funny – he was the funny one of the family ... a natural comedian." "When [the other brothers] introduced him, he would say, 'Yes, I'm the unknown Gershwin.'"

George wrote in one of his last letters to his mother (May 19, 1937), "How is brother Arthur these days? I am glad to hear that he is writing a lot of tunes and I hope that he can find a market for some of them."
