= Frances Gershwin =

American singer, musician & artist (1906–1999)

- Born: Frances Gershwin; December 6, 1906; New York City, U.S.
- Died: January 18, 1999 (aged 92); Manhattan, New York City, U.S.
- Other name: Frances Godowsky
- Occupations: Singer; artist; dancer
- Years active: 1928–1998
- Spouse: Leopold Godowsky Jr.
- Relatives: Ira Gershwin (brother); Arthur Gershwin (brother); George Gershwin (brother)

Frances "Frankie" Gershwin Godowsky (born Frances Gershwin; December 6, 1906 – January 18, 1999) was an American singer, musician, Broadway performer, and artist.

== Background ==
Frances Gershwin was born on December 6, 1906, in Manhattan, New York City, United States, the younger sister of George, Ira, and Arthur Gershwin. She was the first of the Gershwin family to perform as a child, and she brought home a good sum of money for the time.

== Personal life ==
She married Leopold Godowsky Jr., co-inventor (with Leopold Mannes) of Kodachrome color photography. Godowsky was also first violinist with the Los Angeles and San Francisco Symphony Orchestras and performed with his father, the pianist Leopold Godowsky. Actress Dagmar Godowsky became her sister-in-law.

Frances and Leopold had four children: Alexis Gershwin, Leopold Godowsky III, and twins Georgia Keidan and Nadia Natali. All four children were involved in performing and the fine arts. Frances traveled to Europe with her brother George and performed at parties with him. She also performed briefly on Broadway. After she married, she continued her artistic activities, at one point winning a French painting award. In her later years, she returned to singing again and recorded the album For George and Ira in 1973. She died in 1999, aged 92, the last and longest-living of the Gershwin siblings. Her final resting place is the Gershwin Mausoleum, along with her husband, brothers, and parents.

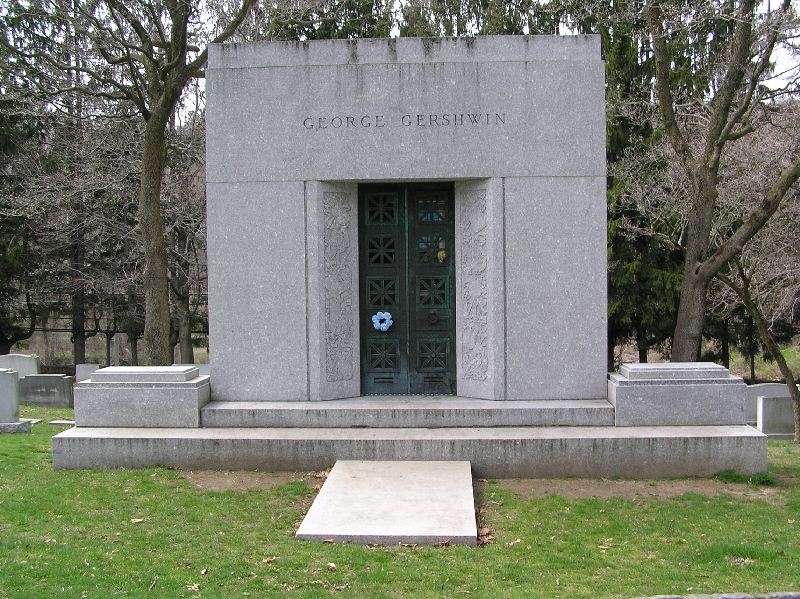
Gershwin mausoleum in Westchester Hills Cemetery
