= Mischa Elman =

Russian-American violinist (1891–1967)

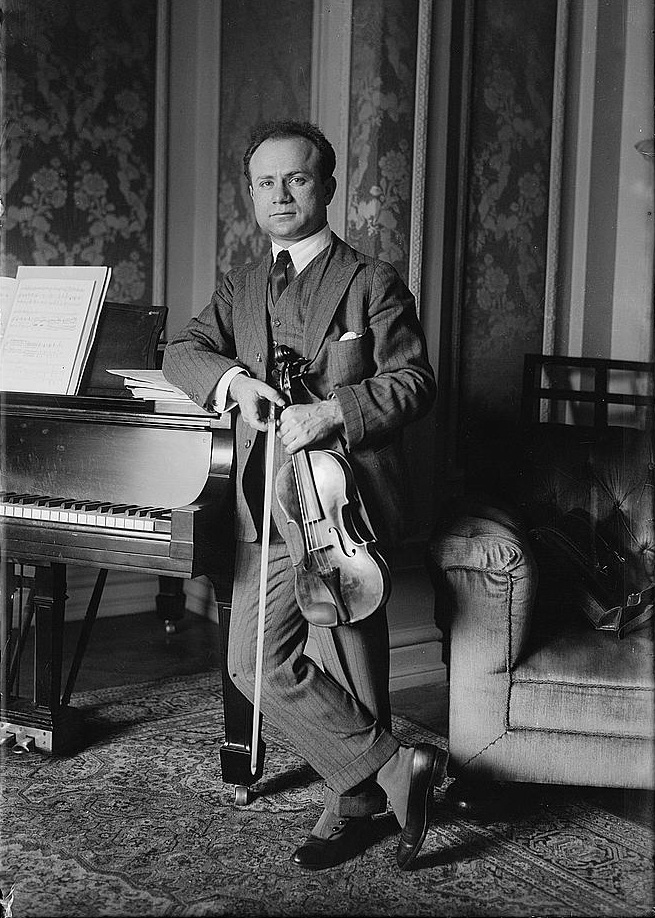
- Elman in 1916
- Born: January 20, 1891; Talnoye, Russian Empire
- Died: April 5, 1967 (aged 76); New York City, US
- Occupation: Violinist

Mischa Elman (Russian: Мойше Шевель-Шлёмович Эльман; January 20, 1891 – April 5, 1967) was a Russian-American violinist famed for his passionate style, beautiful tone, and impeccable artistry and musicality.

== Early life ==
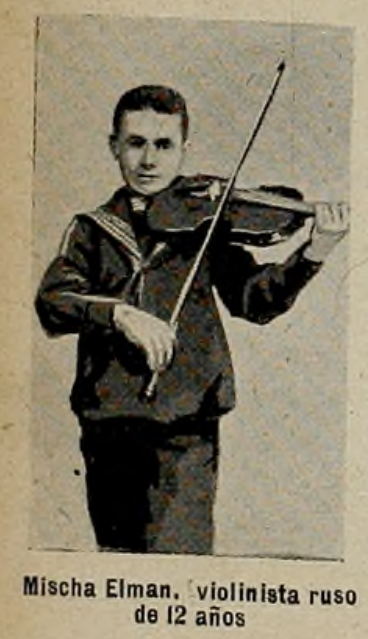
Mischa Elman at age 12 in the Argentine magazine PBT, November 26th, 1904

Moses or Moishe Elman was born to a Jewish family in Talnoye, Umansky Uyezd, Kiev Governorate, Russian Empire (today Talne, Ukraine).

His grandfather Yosele Elman was a klezmer, a Jewish professional traditional musician who played the violin, and his father Shevel-Shloime Iosifovich Elman was a melamed and amateur violinist. It became apparent when Mischa was very young that he had perfect pitch, but his father hesitated about a career as a musician, since musicians were not very high on the social scale. He finally gave in, and gave Mischa a miniature violin, on which he soon learned several tunes by himself. Soon thereafter, he was taken to Odessa, where he studied at the Imperial Academy of Music. Pablo de Sarasate gave him a recommendation, stating that he could become one of the great talents of Europe. He auditioned for Leopold Auer at the age of 11, playing the Wieniawski Concerto No. 2 and 24th Caprice by Paganini. Auer was so impressed that he had Elman admitted to the St. Petersburg Conservatory.

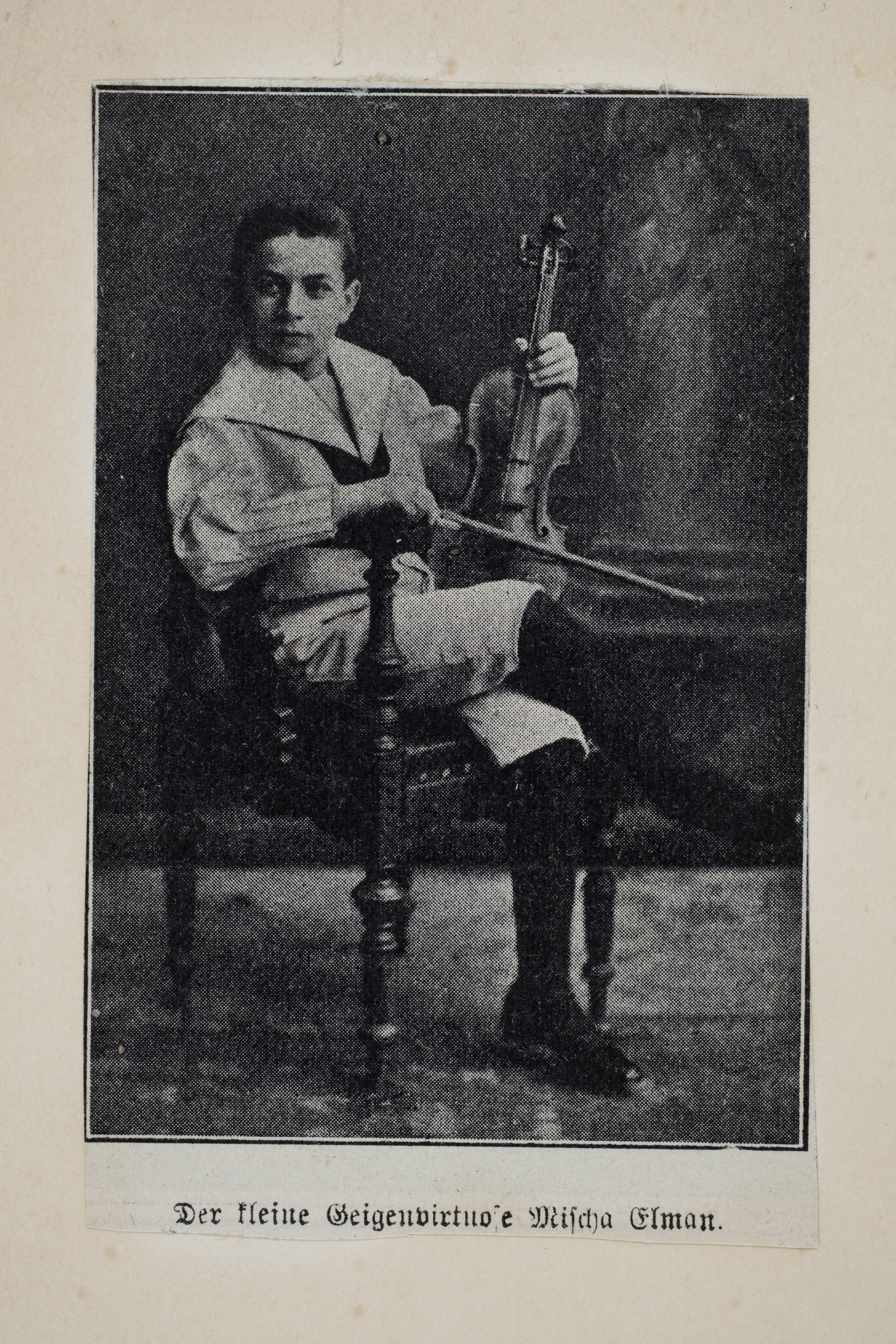
The child prodigy Mischa Elman

Elman was still only a boy when Auer arranged for him to play with the famous Colonne Orchestra during their visit to Pavlovsk. Knowing Édouard Colonne's hatred of child prodigies, Auer did not tell him Elman's age when making the arrangements, and not until the famous conductor saw young Mischa waiting to go on the platform did he realize that he had engaged a child. He was furious, and flatly refused to continue with the programme. Frantic attempts were made to assure him that Elman had the recommendation of Auer himself and was well capable of doing justice to the music, but Colonne was adamant, "I have never yet played with a child, and I refuse to start now", he retorted. So Elman had to play with piano accompaniment while conductor and orchestra sat listening." According to Elman: "I was eleven at the time. When Colonne saw me, violin in hand, ready to step on the stage, he drew himself up and said with emphasis: 'I play with a prodigy! Never!' Nothing could move him, and I had to play to a piano accompaniment. After he had heard me play, though, he came over to me and said: 'The best apology I can make for what I said is to ask you to do me the honor of playing with the Orchestre Colonne in Paris.' He was as good as his word. Four months later I went to Paris and played the Mendelssohn concerto for him with great success."

== Career ==
Meditation (Thaïs)
Recording of Mischa Elman playing the meditation from Massenet's opera Thaïs. (4:27)

Nocturne in E flat major
Recording of Mischa Elman playing Chopin's Nocturne in E flat major. (4:20)

In 1903, Elman began to play concerts in the homes of wealthy patrons of the arts, and he made his Berlin debut in 1904, creating a great sensation. His London debut in 1905 included the British premiere of Alexander Glazunov's Violin Concerto in A minor. He played in Carnegie Hall in 1908, making a great impression on his American audience. He toured Australia in the summer of 1914. After the outbreak of World War I in Europe, Elman returned to the United States and was joined by his family in October 1914.

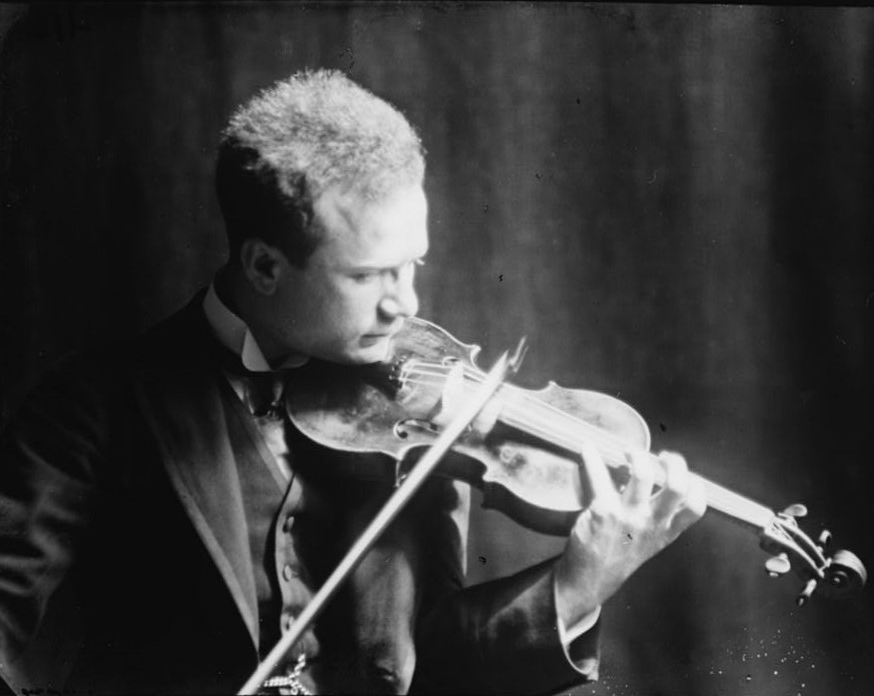
Portrait photograph of Mischa Elman, 1915

In 1917, he was elected to honorary membership in the Phi Mu Alpha Sinfonia music fraternity. Mischa became a U.S. citizen in 1923.

He sometimes performed in as many as 107 concerts in a 29-week season.

In 1943, he gave the premiere of Bohuslav Martinů's second concerto, which was written for him.

Sales of Mischa's records exceeded two million.

A frequent accompanist in chamber works during Elman's early American career was Emmanuel Bay, who was born on exactly the same day as Elman, January 20, 1891. But Elman also performed and recorded with Josef Bonime, Carroll Hollister, Wolfgang Rosé and others, and from 1950, his steady accompanist and recital partner was Joseph Seiger.

He also briefly performed and made recordings with the Mischa Elman String Quartet.

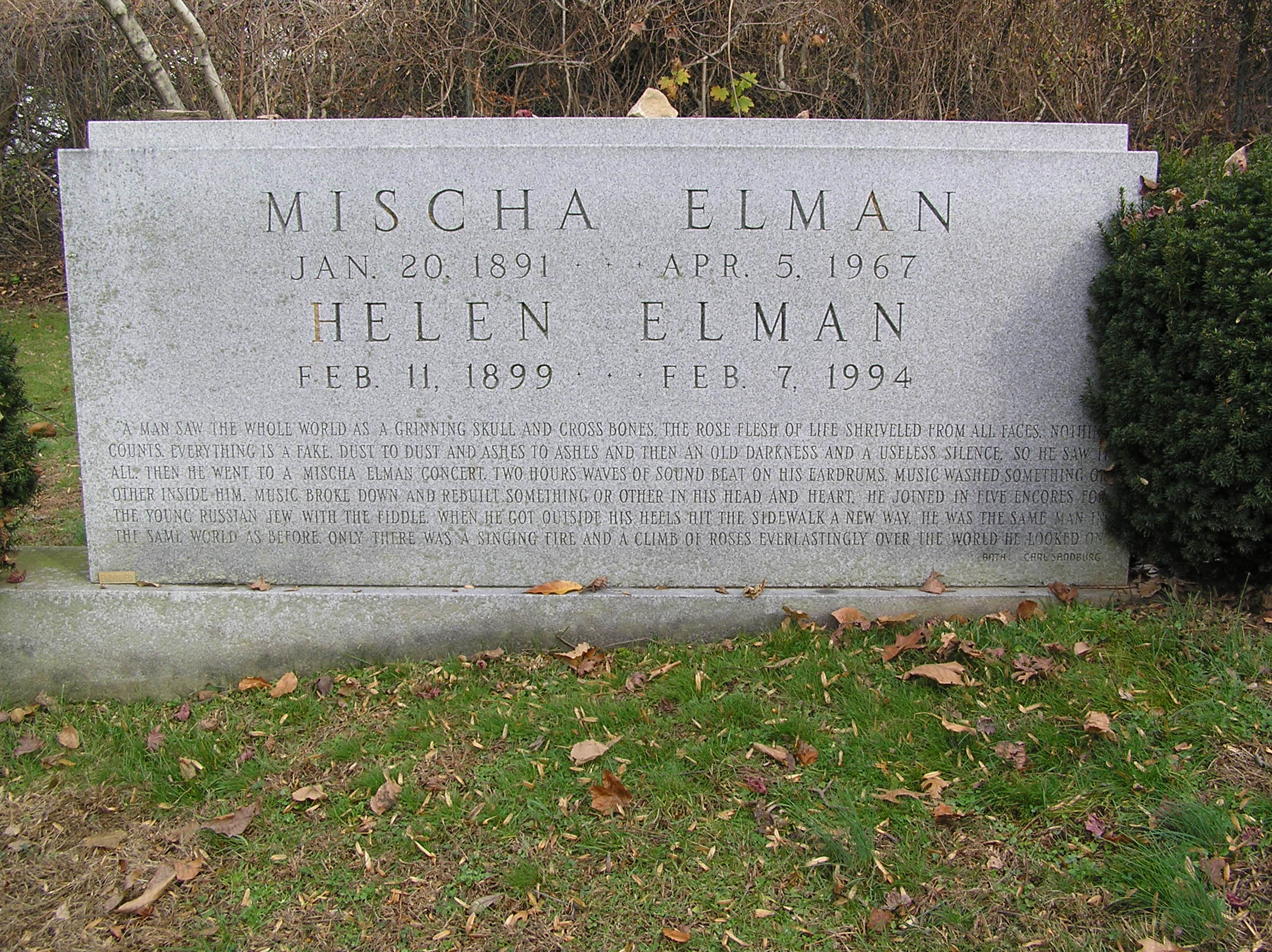
The headstone of Mischa Elman in Westchester Hills Cemetery

Elman died in his apartment on April 5, 1967, in Manhattan, New York City, a few hours after completing a rehearsal with Seiger. He is buried in the Westchester Hills Cemetery in Hastings-on-Hudson, New York.

== Legacy ==
Elman's recorded legacy spanned more than six decades. His first 78 rpm discs were made for Pathé, in Paris, in 1906; his final LP sessions were for Vanguard, in New York, in 1967.

The greater part of his discography was recorded for the Victor Talking Machine Company/RCA Victor, with whom he had an exclusive relationship through 1950. Thereafter, he recorded for Decca/London and later the Vanguard label. Regrettably, Elman's discs have never been reissued on CD in a systematic manner (whereas almost every recording which his contemporary Jascha Heifetz made has been readily available on CD for years).

== Partial discography ==
=== Mono era ===
- Bach – Violin Concerto in E major, BWV 1042 – with John Barbirolli (His Master's Voice DB1871/3)
- Bach – Prelude from the Partita for Solo Violin, BWV 1006 (HMV DB1873)
- Beethoven – Violin Concerto in D major, Op. 61 – with Georg Solti and the London Philharmonic Orchestra (Decca LXT5068) (April 1955)
- Beethoven – Romance in F major for violin and Orchestra (HMV DB 1847)
- Massenet – Élégie Mélodie, with Enrico Caruso (HMV DK 103)
- Mendelssohn – Violin Concerto in E minor, Op. 64 – with Désiré Defauw and the Chicago Symphony Orchestra March 8, 1947
- Raff – Cavatina, with Josef Bonime (HMV DB 1354)
- Sarasate – Zigeunerweisen, Op. 20, No. 1.
- Schubert – Valse Sentimentale, with Carroll Hollister (HMV DA 1144)
- Schumann – Träumerei from Kinderszenen, Op. 15, with Marcel Van Gool (HMV DA 1144)
- Tchaikovsky – Violin Concerto in D major, Op. 35 – with John Barbirolli and the London Symphony Orchestra (HMV DB1405/8)
- Tchaikovsky – Violin Concerto in D major, Op. 35 – with Sir Adrian Boult and the London Philharmonic Orchestra (Decca LXT2970) (June 1954)
- Vivaldi – Concerto in G minor, RV 317 – with Lawrance Collingwood and the New Philharmonia Orchestra (HMV DB1595/6)
- Wieniawski – Violin Concerto in D minor, Op. 22 – with the "Robin Hood Dell" (aka Philadelphia) Orchestra
- Wieniawski – Violin Concerto in D minor, Op. 22 – with Adrian Boult and the London Philharmonic Orchestra (Decca LXT5222) (March 1956)
- Wieniawski – Legend, Op. 17

=== Stereo era ===
- Bach – Violin Concerto in E major, BWV 1042 – with Vladimir Golschmann, and the Vienna State Opera Orchestra
- Dvořák – Slavonic Fantasy in B minor
- Khachaturian – Violin Concerto & Saint-Saëns – Introduction and Rondo Capriccioso – with Vladimir Golschmann, and the Vienna State Opera Orchestra
- Kreisler – La Précieuse
- Kreisler – Schoen Rosmarin – The Bell Telephone Hour orchestra under Donald Voorhees
- Lalo – Symphonie Espagnole for Violin and Orchestra, Op. 21 – Vienna State Opera Orchestra under Vladimir Golschmann
- Felix Mendelssohn – Violin Concerto in E Minor, Op. 64 – Vienna State Opera Orchestra under Vladimir Golschmann
- Nardini – Violin Concerto in E minor – with Vladimir Golschmann, and the Vienna State Opera Orchestra
- Smetana – Má vlast, No. 2
- Vivaldi – Violin Concerto in G minor, RV 317 – with Vladimir Golschmann, and the Vienna State Opera Orchestra

== Sources ==
- Kozinn, Allan (1990). Mischa Elman and the Romantic Style. Chur, Switzerland; New York: Harwood Academic Publishers. ISBN 3-7186-0497-3
- Kuhn, Laura Diane; Slonimsky, Nicolas, eds. "Mischa Elman". Baker's Biographical Dictionary of Music and Musicians (Centennial [8th] ed.). New York: Schirmer Books. ISBN 0-02-872415-1.
- Molkhou, Jean-Michel (2011). "Mischa Elman", in Les grands violonistes du XXe siècle. Tome 1- De Kreisler à Kremer, 1875-1947. Paris: Buchet Chastel. pp. 75–80. ISBN 978-2-283-02508-6
- Roth, Henry (1997). Violin Virtuosos: From Paganini to the 21st Century. Los Angeles, CA: California Classics Books. pp. 82–90. ISBN 1-879395-15-0
- Frederick H. Martens project Gutenberg Ebook 2005
- Violin Mastery "Talks with Master Violinists and Teachers"
