= Gershwin Plays Gershwin: The Piano Rolls =

Compilation album by George Gershwin
- Released: 1993
- Recorded: November 1992, February and June 1993
- Studios: The American Academy of Arts and Letters, New York City
- Genres: Jazz, classical
- Length: 60:08
- Label: Nonesuch Records
- Producer: Max Wilcox

Professional ratings
Review scores
Source	Rating
AllMusic	4.5/5 stars
Christgau's Consumer Guide	A−

Gershwin Plays Gershwin: The Piano Rolls is an album of piano rolls recorded (with one exception) by George Gershwin. It was released by Nonesuch Records in 1993.

== Recording ==
Gershwin recorded these piano rolls between 1916 and 1927. Several rolls use overdubbing, so that Gershwin is in effect playing a four-handed piece solo.

The final selection, "An American In Paris", was recorded by Frank Milne in 1933. Milne worked as a roll-editor with Gershwin in the 1920s, and edited several of the rolls reproduced on this disc. So skilled was Milne as a roll editor, the liner notes suggest that he may not have actually "played" "An American In Paris" at all—in the same way that a musician can write sheet music, Milne was able to prepare roll masters by marking the lines on special graph paper that would be used as a template for the holes punched in the actual piano roll.

The piano rolls were played back on a 9-foot Yamaha Disklavier grand piano, augmented by a 1911 Pianola operated by Artis Wodehouse. The Pianola allows for the operator to add "live" effects with piano footpumps and expression levers.

== Reception ==
Allmusic awarded the album with 4.5 stars and its review by Scott Yanow states: "George Gershwin made 130 piano rolls between 1916 and 1927. Certainly such tunes as "Novelette in Fourths," "So Am I," and "Idle Dreams" are long forgotten but worth reviving."

Nonesuch issued a follow-up album, Gershwin Plays Gershwin: The Piano Rolls, Vol. 2, in 1995.

== Track listing ==
No.	Title	Music	Length
1.	"Sweet and Lowdown"	George Gershwin (Lyric: Ira Gershwin)	3:30
2.	"Novelette in Fourths"	George Gershwin	2:24
3.	"That Certain Feeling"	George Gershwin (Lyric: Ira Gershwin)	2:45
4.	"So Am I"	George Gershwin (Lyric: Ira Gershwin)	4:14
5.	"Rhapsody in Blue"	George Gershwin	14:22
6.	"Swanee"	George Gershwin (Lyric: Irving Caesar)	2:17
7.	"When You Want 'Em You Can't Get 'Em, When You've Got 'Em, You Don't Want 'Em"	George Gershwin (Lyric: Murray Roth)	1:57
8.	"Kickin' the Clouds Away"	George Gershwin (Lyric: Ira Gershwin, Buddy DeSylva)	3:20
9.	"Idle Dreams"	George Gershwin (Lyric: Arthur Jackson)	2:59
10.	"On My Mind the Whole Night Long"	George Gershwin (Lyric: Arthur Jackson)	2:30
11.	"Scandal Walk"	George Gershwin (Lyric: Arthur Jackson)	3:15
12.	"An American in Paris"	George Gershwin	16:36

== Personnel ==
- George Gershwin – piano rolls reproduced on Yamaha Disklavier DCF111S player piano
- Artis Wodehouse - Pianola (piano roll playback & artistic interpretation)
- Max Wilcox – producer, engineer
