= Boris Pregel =

Engineer (1893–1976)

Boris Pregel (Russian: Борис Юльевич Прегель; 24 January 1893 – 7 December 1976) was a Russian Empire–born Jewish engineer and dealer in uranium and radium. He was born in Odessa, in the Russian Empire, and studied engineering in Belgium at the Free University of Brussels and the University of Liège. He served in the Russian army in World War I, entering as a private soldier and rising to the rank of colonel of engineers. He was put in charge of Russia's only aircraft factory. He moved to Paris after the October Revolution.

In Paris he came in contact with Edgar Sengier, a Belgian mining engineer, who was effectively in charge of the mining company, Union Minière, in the Belgian Congo. Pregel became interested in the radium department of this company. From the 1920s to the Second World War Pregel and Sengier controlled the world's supply of radium. He also promoted the building of many radio-therapy installations, including the Queen Sofia Hospital (Sophiahemmet) in Sweden. He ensured that Marie Curie was lent a five-gram radium source which was used in some of her important experiments.

His first wife, the daughter of a Saint Petersburg lawyer, predeceased him. In 1937 he remarried to the artist Alexandra Avksentiev, the daughter of Nikolai Avksentiev. In 1939 he was awarded the French Legion of Honour in recognition of his role as the head of the International Organisation to Fight Cancer. The couple fled to New York in 1940, after the Nazi invasion of France.

After his arrival in the US he established, with his brother Alexander, the Canadian Radium and Uranium Corp of New York and became its president to sell the newly discovered rich ores in northern Canada, and later also in Colorado. George B. Pegram and his associates at Columbia University, who did some of the initial work on the Manhattan Project, sought Pregel's assistance because they did not have sufficient money to buy the uranium. Pregel gave them the first uranium used in the experiments. Pregel's company also built radioactive neutron sources and radioactive luminescent signs.

Pregel was also the agent for the Canadian Eldorado Mining & Refining Co. which supplied the Manhattan Project with nearly all the uranium mined in North America. He also sold 0.23 tonnes of uranium oxide to the Soviet Union during the war, with the authorization of the U.S. government.

In March 1945 the Canadian Foreign Exchange Control Board began formal hearings into Pregel's financial dealings. The case was settled out of court but Pregel and the other defendants paid over $1 million in cash and other assets to settle. Furthermore, Pregel agreed to terminate his agency agreement between Eldorado and the Canadian Radium & Uranium Corp.

In 1946, in a speech to The New School, Pregel shared his thoughts on the nuclear world he had helped bring into being:

Since the beginning of the world we were never so rich in knowledge as we have become in the past thirty years, but never was this knowledge used so badly. It seems that mankind, which is now capable of completely transforming the world, has ceased to understand exactly what it is doing. Where is it absolutely clear that the actual state of science can make accessible to mankind all the food, work, security and liberty to which it aspires? The most that has come of our new knowledge has been the danger of death, misery, and unhappiness. It is therefore necessary that the science that was so largely utilized for war purposes should at least play the same important role in peacetime and thus accomplish its real mission. …Knowledge alone is not enough. All now depends on how man will apply it. Will we burn our wings like Icarus who carelessly came too near the sun, or shall we, like Prometheus, bring back to earth divine fire, using it to our best advantage. We are living in the new era and we have to accept all the consequences. We have to use them for the development and freedom of mankind. Our knowledge can mean war and devastation, but I firmly believe that mankind will choose the road to wealth and freedom for all the world.

He served as president and board chairman of the New York Academy of Sciences, as president of the French University (Ecole Libre) in New York, as trustee of the New School for Social Research and as vice-president of the American Geographical Society. He received several honorary degrees and foreign decorations. Pregel founded the Boris Pregel Awards for science, awarded by the New York Academy of Sciences.
