= Charles Hambitzer =

American composer and pianist

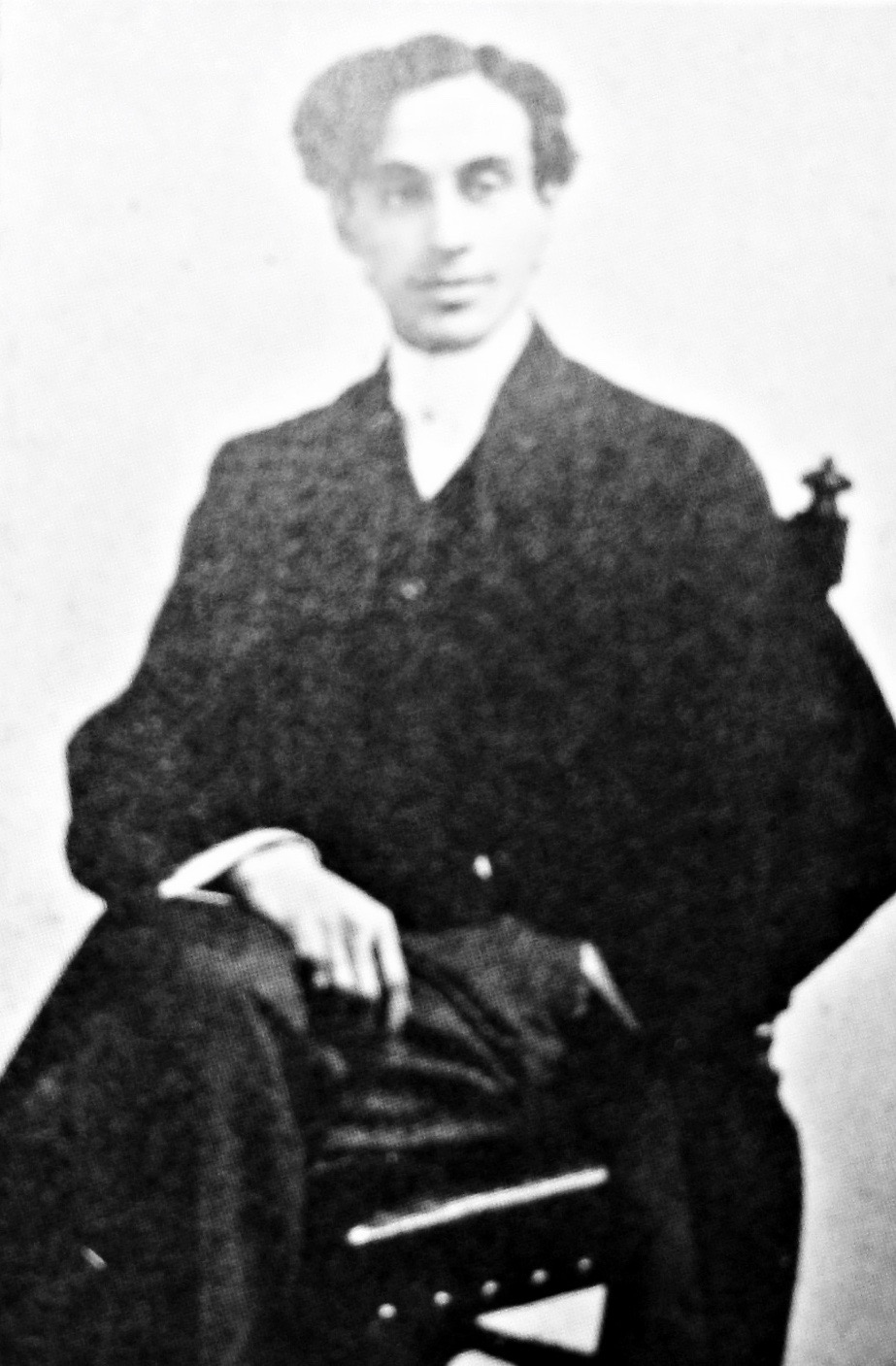
Hambitzer in 1910

Charles Hambitzer (1878 or 1881 – 1918) was an American composer, pianist and teacher. He is noted for having been a teacher of George Gershwin.

== Biography ==
Hambitzer was born into a Jewish musical family in Beloit, Wisconsin. The year of his birth is variously given as either 1878 or 1881. His great-grandfather was a violinist in the Russian royal court and his father owned a music store in Milwaukee. He studied with Julius Albert Jahn and Hugo Kahn after which he played in the orchestra of the Arthur Friend Stock Company. He taught piano, violin, and cello at the Wisconsin Conservatory of Music. In 1908, he moved to New York City where he joined the Waldorf–Astoria Orchestra, usually appearing as piano soloist. During that time he lived on the Upper West Side of Manhattan where he wrote music and opened a music school. Among his most notable pupils was George Gershwin, who became one of America's leading composers. In 1914, Hambitzer's wife died of tuberculosis and four years later he died of the same disease.

George once said that Charles was his first major musical influence in life.

Nathaniel Shilkret, a noted composer and conductor, was a member of the Waldorf-Astoria Orchestra during the period that Hambitzer was there. Shilkret's autobiography includes a brief discussion of Hambitzer's life, including the following comments about their common time with the Waldorf-Astoria Orchestra: "Hambitzer played viola, oboe, bassoon, cello and organ, but [during this period], never piano." Shilkret said that Frank Longo, the then-Waldorf-Astoria Orchestra pianist, dared Hambitzer to show how good he was when an orchestra member told Longo to take piano lessons from Hambitzer. Shilkret writes about Hambitzer's response: "Hambitzer said, 'I have not touched the piano for years, but I'll try.' He sat down and played one classic composition after another. He could play any number we suggested. He was the most natural pianist I ever heard--barring no one--and his memory was phenomenal. Bach, Beethoven, Mozart, Schubert, Chopin, Schumann, Liszt. . . Pieces just poured out of him flawlessly. . . . Of course, Hambitzer's performance got around, and in a short time he became the busiest teacher in New York. . . . I studied piano with him." As an A&R executive at the Victor Talking Machine and a conductor who had conducted for very large number of the finest musicians of his era, Shilkret was eminently qualified to judge a musician's talent.

== Compositions ==
Hambitzer was noted for his prodigious musical talent and feverish compositional skill. He wrote many songs, and his work also included orchestral tone poems and incidental music for plays by Shakespeare and other playwrights.
