= Alexandra Pregel =

Russian artist

Alexandra Pregel (née Avksentieva; Russian: Александра Николаевна Прегель, Aleksandra Nikolayevna Pregel) (15 December 1907 Helsinki – 28 May 1984, New York City) was a Russian artist.

She was born in Helsinki, Grand Duchy of Finland, where her parents lived when the country was part of Russia. Her father was socialist political figure Nikolai Avksentiev

Her father became Minister of the Interior in the Kerensky government. After the October Revolution Pregel left Russia, fleeing the Bolshevik regime, for Paris with her mother Maria and her stepfather, the Russian writer and editor Mikhail Tsetlin (aka Mikhail Zetlin). In 1921, Alexandra was accepted into the studio of the Russian neoclassic artists Vasil Shukhaev and Aleksandr Yakovlev in Montparnasse. In 1928, Alexandra graduated from the Ecole Nationale Superieure des Arts Decoratifs and continued her studies with Natalia Goncharova.

In 1937 she married Boris Pregel, a Ukrainian dealer in uranium and radium. The couple fled to New York City in 1940, after the Nazi invasion of France leaving behind 300 works. They moved into a Manhattan apartment overlooking Central Park, which also become Alexandra’s studio.

She had her first exhibition in the United States in 1943 showing 36 paintings and in 1944 Alexandra Pregel was accepted as a member of the National Association of Women Artists. In later years she exhibited regularly, including in Paris in 1947. She also illustrated Russian literary works, the Jewish Bible and the Haggadah (Jewish Passover service). She stopped painting after the death of her husband in 1976.
