= George Gershwin =

American composer and pianist (1898–1937)

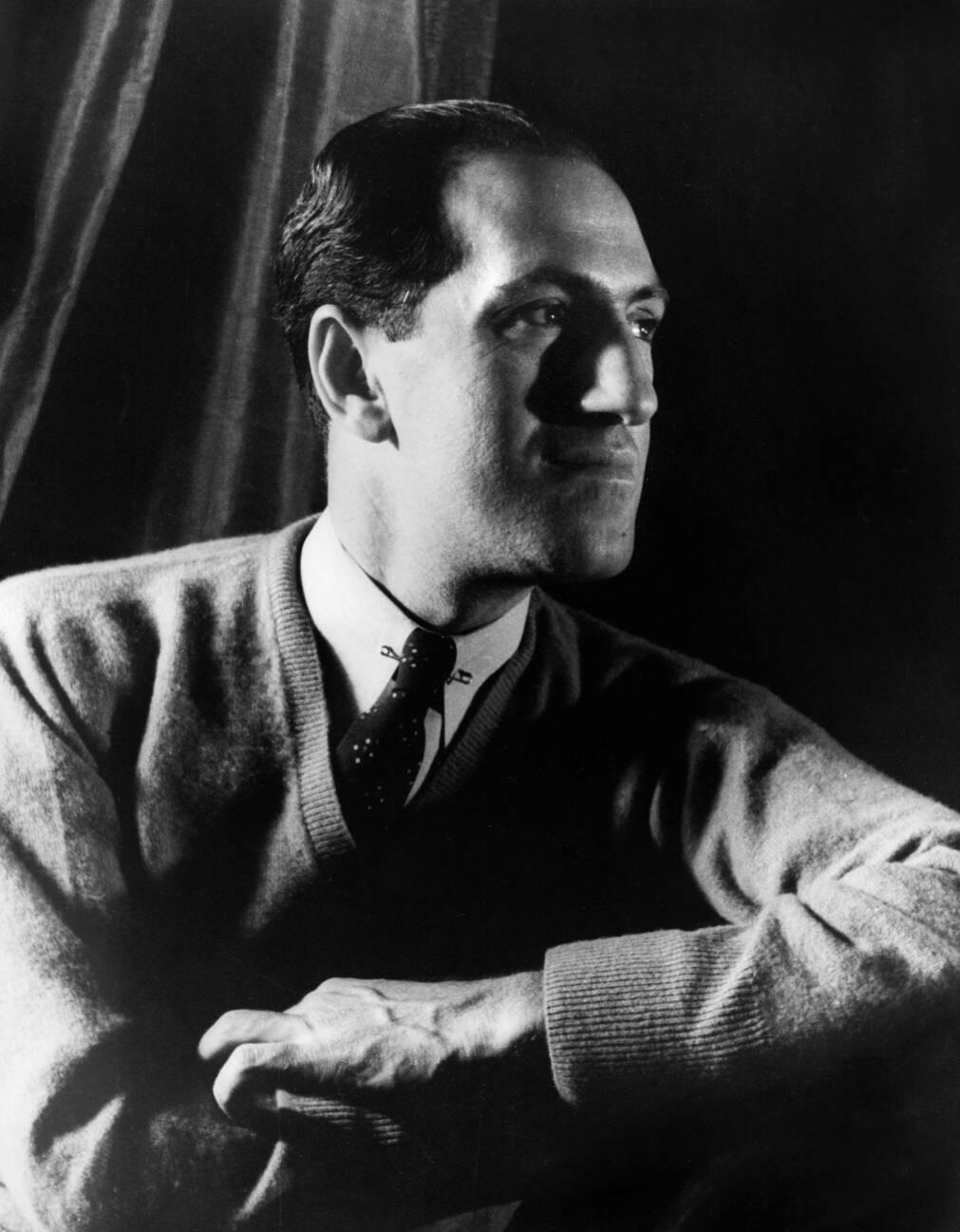
- Gershwin in 1937
- Born: Jacob Gershwine; September 26, 1898; New York City, U.S.
- Died: July 11, 1937 (aged 38); Los Angeles, California, U.S.
- Resting place: Westchester Hills Cemetery
- Occupations: Composer; pianist
- Years active: 1916–1937
- Relatives: Ira Gershwin (brother); Arthur Gershwin (brother); Frances Gershwin (sister)

George Gershwin (/ˈɡɜːrʃ.wɪn/; born Jacob Gershwine; September 26, 1898 – July 11, 1937) was an American composer and pianist whose compositions spanned jazz, popular and classical music. Among his best-known works are the songs "Swanee" (1919) and "Fascinating Rhythm" (1924), the orchestral compositions Rhapsody in Blue (1924) and An American in Paris (1928) and his Piano Concerto (1925), the jazz standards "Embraceable You" (1928) and "I Got Rhythm" (1930) and the opera Porgy and Bess (1935), which included the hit "Summertime". His Of Thee I Sing (1931) was the first musical to win the Pulitzer Prize for Drama, although as composer, he did not participate in reception of the award.

Gershwin studied piano under Charles Hambitzer and composition with Rubin Goldmark, Henry Cowell, and Joseph Brody. He began his career as a song plugger but soon started composing Broadway theater works with his brother Ira Gershwin and with Buddy DeSylva. He moved to Paris, intending to study with Nadia Boulanger, but she refused him, afraid that rigorous classical study would ruin his jazz-influenced style; Maurice Ravel voiced similar objections when Gershwin inquired about studying with him. He subsequently composed An American in Paris, returned to New York City and wrote Porgy and Bess with Ira and DuBose Heyward. Initially a commercial failure, it came to be considered one of the most important American operas of the 20th century and an American cultural classic.

Gershwin moved to Hollywood and composed several film scores. He died in 1937, 38 years old, of a brain tumor. His compositions have been adapted for use in film and television, with many becoming jazz standards.

== Life and career ==
=== Ancestors ===
Gershwin's parents were both Jewish immigrants from the Russian Empire. His paternal grandfather, Jakov Gershovitz, was born in Odessa, then part of the Russian Empire, and had served for 25 years as a mechanic for the Imperial Russian Army to earn the right of free travel and residence as a Jew, finally retiring near Saint Petersburg, Russia. Jakov's teenage son, Moishe, George Gershwin's father, worked as a leather cutter for women's shoes. George's mother, Roza Bruskina, was born in Saint Petersburg.

Moishe met Roza in Vilna, Russian Empire (now Vilnius, Lithuania), where her father worked as a furrier. She and her family moved to New York because of increasing anti-Jewish sentiment in Russia, changing her first name to Rose. Moishe, faced with compulsory military service if he remained in Russia, moved to America as soon as he could afford to (arrived on August 14, 1890). Once in New York, he changed his first name to Morris. Gershovitz lived with a maternal uncle in Brooklyn, working as a foreman in a women's shoe factory. He married Rose on July 21, 1895, and Gershovitz soon Anglicized his name to Gershwine. Their first child, Ira Gershwin, was born on December 6, 1896, after which the family moved into a second-floor apartment at 242 Snediker Avenue in the East New York neighborhood of Brooklyn.

=== Early life ===
George was born on September 26, 1898, in the Snediker Avenue apartment. His birth certificate identifies him as Jacob Gershwine, with the surname pronounced "Gershvin" in the Yiddish-speaking community. He was named after his grandfather, and, contrary to the American practice, had no middle name. He soon became known as George, and changed the spelling of his surname to "Gershwin" around the time he became a professional musician; other family members followed suit after Ira and George, another boy, Arthur Gershwin (1900–1981), and a girl, Frances Gershwin (1906–1999), were born into the family. The family lived in many different residences, as their father changed dwellings with each new enterprise in which he became involved. They grew up mostly in the Yiddish Theater District. George and Ira frequented the local Yiddish theaters, with George occasionally appearing onstage as an extra.

George lived a boyhood not unusual in New York tenements, which included running around with his friends, roller-skating and misbehaving in the streets. Until 1908, he cared nothing about music. Then, as a ten-year-old, he was intrigued upon hearing his friend Maxie Rosenzweig's violin recital. The sound, and the way his friend played, captivated him. At about the same time, George's parents had bought a piano for his older brother Ira. To his parents' surprise, though, and to Ira's relief, it was George who spent more time playing it as he continued to enjoy it.

Although his younger sister Frances Gershwin was the first in the family to make a living through her musical talents, she married young and devoted herself to being a mother and housewife, thus precluding spending any serious time on musical endeavors. Having given up her performing career, she settled upon painting as a creative outlet, which had also been a hobby George briefly pursued. Arthur Gershwin followed in the paths of George and Ira, also becoming a composer of songs, musicals, and short piano pieces. George studied with various piano teachers for about two years (circa 1911) before finally being introduced to Charles Hambitzer by Jack Miller (circa 1913), the pianist in the Beethoven Symphony Orchestra. Until his death in 1918, Hambitzer remained Gershwin's musical mentor, taught him conventional piano technique, introduced him to music of the European classical tradition, and encouraged him to attend orchestral concerts.

=== Tin Pan Alley and Broadway: 1913–1923 ===
Swanee
Al Jolson's hit 1920 recording of George Gershwin and Irving Caesar's 1919 "Swanee".

In 1913, Gershwin left school at the age of 15 to work as a "song plugger" on New York City's Tin Pan Alley. He earned $15 a week from Jerome H. Remick and Company, a Detroit-based publishing firm with a branch office in New York. His first published song was "When You Want 'Em, You Can't Get 'Em, When You've Got 'Em, You Don't Want 'Em" in 1916. It earned the 17-year-old 50 cents.

In 1916, Gershwin started working for Aeolian Company and Standard Music Rolls in New York City, recording and arranging. He produced dozens, if not hundreds, of rolls under his own and assumed names (pseudonyms attributed to Gershwin include Fred Murtha and Bert Wynn). He also recorded rolls of his own compositions for the Duo-Art and Welte-Mignon reproducing pianos. As well as recording piano rolls, Gershwin made a brief foray into vaudeville, accompanying both Nora Bayes and Louise Dresser on the piano. His first song to appear on Broadway was "Making of a Girl", written in 1916 with Sigmund Romberg and lyrics by Harold Atteridge. It was sung in The Passing Show of 1916. His 1917 novelty rag, "Rialto Ripples", was a commercial success. In addition to his musical activities, he took over the management of the popular and famous gay bathhouse Lafayette Baths together with his brother Ira.

In 1919, Gershwin scored his first big national hit with his song "Swanee", with words by Irving Caesar. Al Jolson, a Broadway star and former minstrel singer, heard Gershwin perform "Swanee" at a party and decided to sing it in one of his shows. In the late 1910s, Gershwin met songwriter and music director William Daly. The two collaborated on the Broadway musicals Piccadilly to Broadway (1920) and For Goodness Sake (1922), and jointly composed the score for Our Nell (1923). This was the beginning of a long friendship. Daly was a frequent arranger, orchestrator and conductor of Gershwin's music, and Gershwin periodically turned to him for musical advice.

Beginning in the early 1920s, Gershwin frequently worked with the lyricist Buddy DeSylva. In 1922, they created the experimental one-act jazz opera Blue Monday, set in Harlem. It is widely regarded as a forerunner to the groundbreaking Porgy and Bess introduced in 1935.

=== Musicals, Europe and classical music: 1924–1928 ===
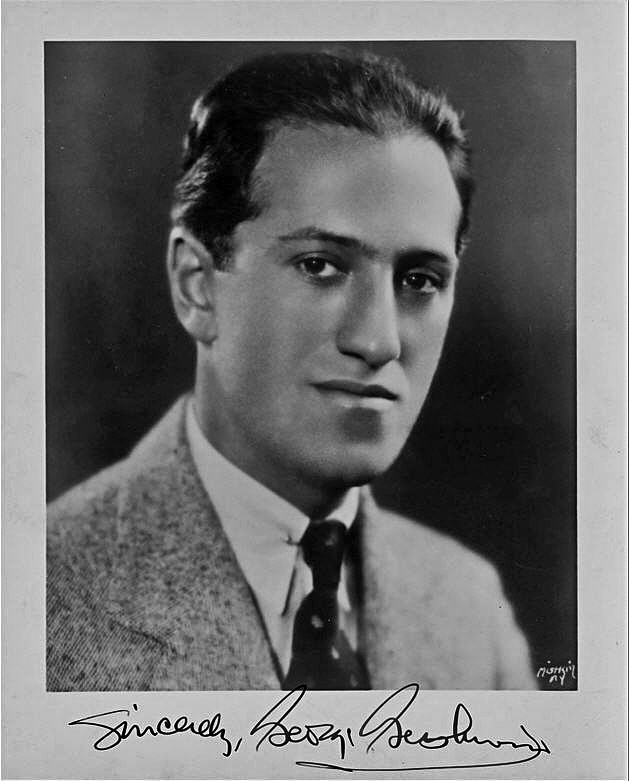
George Gershwin, c. 1935

In 1924, Gershwin composed his first major work, Rhapsody in Blue, for orchestra and piano. It was orchestrated by Ferde Grofé and premiered by Paul Whiteman's Concert Band, in New York. It subsequently went on to be his most popular work, and established Gershwin's signature style and genius in blending vastly different musical styles, including jazz and classical music, in revolutionary ways. In the following year he wrote his "Piano Concerto in F", which has also become an established part of the classical repertoire.

In the same year, George and Ira Gershwin collaborated on a stage musical comedy Lady Be Good, which included such future standards as "Fascinating Rhythm" and "Oh, Lady Be Good!".

In April 1925, the Broadway musical Tell Me More opened at the Gaiety Theatre in New York. In May 1925 it opened at the Winter Garden theatre in London which was directed by Clifford Whitley from The Co-Optimists. A massive smash hit that ran for 263 performances. This show officially anchored Elsa Macfarlane as an elite West End star, she performed alongside comedy king Leslie Henson.

George and Ira Gershwin followed this with Oh, Kay! (1926), Funny Face (1927) and Strike Up the Band (1927 and 1930). Gershwin allowed the latter song, with a modified title, to be used as a football fight song, "Strike Up The Band for UCLA".

In the mid-1920s, Gershwin stayed in Paris for a short period, during which he applied to study composition with the noted Nadia Boulanger, who, along with several other prospective tutors such as Maurice Ravel, turned him down, afraid that rigorous classical study would ruin his jazz-influenced style. While there, Gershwin wrote the tone poem An American in Paris. This work received mixed reviews upon its first performance at Carnegie Hall on December 13, 1928, but it quickly became part of the standard repertoire in Europe and the United States.

=== New York: 1929–1935 ===
In 1929, the Gershwin brothers created Show Girl; the following year brought Girl Crazy, which introduced the standards "Embraceable You", sung by Ginger Rogers, and "I Got Rhythm". 1931's Of Thee I Sing became the first musical comedy to win the Pulitzer Prize for Drama; the winners were George S. Kaufman, Morrie Ryskind, and Ira Gershwin. Gershwin spent the summer of 1934 on South Carolina's Folly Island after he was invited to visit by DuBose Heyward, author of the novel Porgy. It was there that he was inspired to write the music to his opera Porgy and Bess. Porgy and Bess was considered another American classic by the composer of Rhapsody in Blue — even if critics could not quite figure out how to evaluate it, or decide whether it was opera or simply an ambitious Broadway musical. "It crossed the barriers," per theater historian Robert Kimball. "It wasn't a musical work per se, and it wasn't a drama per se – it elicited response from both music and drama critics. But the work has sort of always been outside category."

=== Last years: 1936–1937 ===
After the commercial failure of Porgy and Bess, Gershwin moved to Hollywood, California. He befriended Arnold Schoenberg, with whom he played tennis. In 1936, he was commissioned by RKO Pictures to write the music for the film Shall We Dance, starring Fred Astaire and Ginger Rogers. Gershwin's score, which married ballet with jazz in a new way, runs over an hour. It took Gershwin several months to compose and orchestrate.

George and Ira also wrote the songs for A Damsel in Distress, like Shall We Dance released in 1937, and some of the songs for The Goldwyn Follies. After George's death in 1937 Ira continued working with Vernon Duke on the latter film and it was released in 1938.

George and Ira's songs for the three films included an high amount of popular hits and future jazz standards: "They All Laughed", "Let's Call the Whole Thing Off" and "They Can't Take That Away from Me" from Shall We Dance, "Nice Work If You Can Get It" and "A Foggy Day" from A Damsel in Distress, and "Love Is Here to Stay" from The Goldwyn Follies.

=== Illness and death ===
Early in 1937, Gershwin began to complain of blinding headaches and a recurring impression that he smelled burning rubber. As early as February 1934, he had said he smelled burning garbage at the Detroit railway station, though those with him did not. On February 11, 1937, he performed his Piano Concerto in F in a special concert of his music with the San Francisco Symphony Orchestra under the direction of French maestro Pierre Monteux. Gershwin, normally a superb pianist in his own compositions, suffered coordination problems and blackouts during the performance. He was at the time working on other Hollywood film projects while living with Ira and his wife Leonore in their rented house in Beverly Hills. Leonore Gershwin began to be disturbed by George's mood swings and his seeming inability to eat without spilling food at the dinner table. She suspected mental illness and insisted he be moved out of their house to lyricist Yip Harburg's empty quarters nearby, where he was placed in the care of his valet, Paul Mueller. The headaches and olfactory hallucinations continued.

On the night of July 9, 1937, Gershwin collapsed in Harburg's house, where he had been working on the score of The Goldwyn Follies. His last words were "Fred Astaire". He was rushed to Cedars of Lebanon Hospital in Los Angeles, and fell into a coma. Only then did his doctors come to believe that he was suffering from a brain tumor. Leonore called George's close friend Emil Mosbacher and explained the dire need to find a neurosurgeon. Mosbacher immediately called pioneering neurosurgeon Harvey Cushing in Boston, who, retired for several years by then, recommended Walter Dandy, who was on a boat fishing in the Chesapeake Bay with Harry Nice, the governor of Maryland. Mosbacher called the White House and had a Coast Guard cutter sent to find the governor's yacht and bring Dandy quickly to shore.

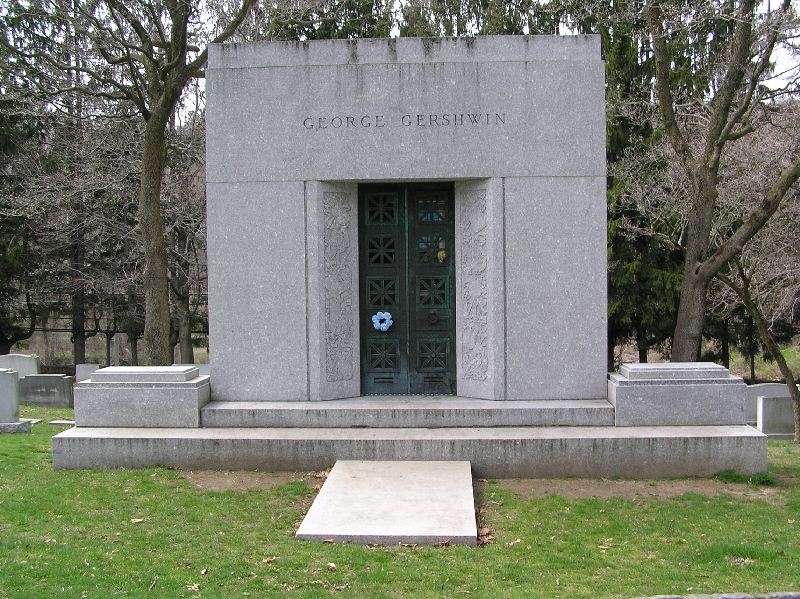
Gershwin's mausoleum in Westchester Hills Cemetery

Mosbacher then chartered a plane and flew Dandy to Newark Airport, where he was to catch a plane to Los Angeles; by that time, Gershwin's condition was critical and the need for surgery was immediate. Before Dandy could arrive, in the early hours of Sunday, July 11, 1937, doctors at Cedars removed a large brain tumor, believed to have been a glioblastoma, but Gershwin died that morning at the age of 38. The fact that he had suddenly collapsed and become comatose after he stood up on July 9 has been interpreted as brain herniation with Duret hemorrhages.

Gershwin's friends and admirers were devastated. John O'Hara remarked: "George Gershwin died on July 11, 1937, but I don't have to believe that if I don't want to." He was interred at Westchester Hills Cemetery in Hastings-on-Hudson, New York. A memorial concert was held at the Hollywood Bowl on September 8, 1937, at which Otto Klemperer conducted his own orchestration of the second of Gershwin's Three Preludes.

=== Relationship with Kay Swift ===
Gershwin had a ten-year affair with composer Kay Swift, whom he frequently consulted about his music. The two never married, although she eventually divorced her husband James Warburg to commit to the relationship. Swift's granddaughter, Katharine Weber, has suggested that the pair were not married because George's mother Rose was "unhappy that Kay Swift wasn't Jewish". The Gershwins' 1926 musical Oh, Kay! was named for her. After Gershwin's death, Swift arranged some of his music, transcribed several of his recordings, and collaborated with his brother Ira on several projects.

== Musical style and influence ==
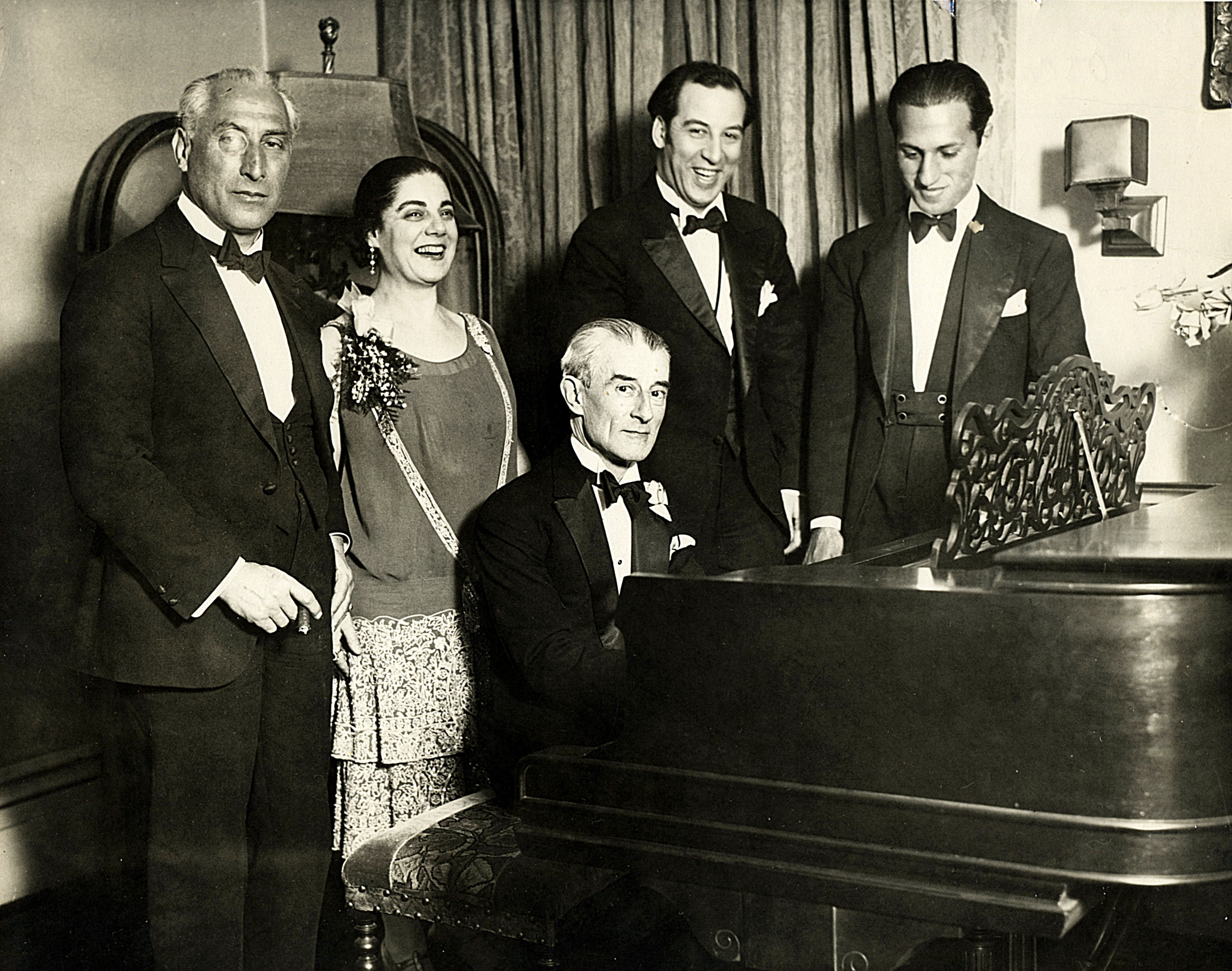
Birthday party honoring Maurice Ravel in New York City, March 8, 1928. From left: Oskar Fried; Éva Gauthier; Ravel at piano; Manoah Leide-Tedesco; and George Gershwin.

Rodney Greenberg writes of Gershwin: "Rhythmic and melodious, Gershwin's music fuses popular elements from the American melting-pot: the flattened notes and syncopations of African-American blues and ragtime; Hispanic rhythms; the aching cadences of Hebrew chant. More classical ingredients range from the harmonies of Chopin, Liszt and Debussy to the sprightly patter of Gilbert and Sullivan. ... His passions in classical music ranged widely, from Bach to Alban Berg." Gershwin was influenced by French composers of the early twentieth century. In turn, Maurice Ravel was impressed with Gershwin's abilities, commenting, "Personally I find jazz most interesting: the rhythms, the way the melodies are handled, the melodies themselves. I have heard of George Gershwin's works and I find them intriguing." The orchestrations in Gershwin's symphonic works often seem similar to those of Ravel; likewise, Ravel's two piano concertos evince an influence of Gershwin.

Gershwin asked to study with Ravel. When Ravel heard how much Gershwin earned, Ravel replied with words to the effect of, "You should give me lessons." (Some versions of this story feature Igor Stravinsky rather than Ravel as the composer; however Stravinsky confirmed that he originally heard the story from Ravel.)

Gershwin's own Concerto in F was criticized for being related to the work of Debussy, more than to the expected jazz style. The comparison did not deter him from continuing to explore French styles. The title of An American in Paris reflects the very journey that he had consciously taken as a composer: "The opening part will be developed in typical French style, in the manner of Debussy and Les Six, though the tunes are original."

Gershwin was intrigued by the works of Arnold Schoenberg, Igor Stravinsky, Dmitri Shostakovich, Darius Milhaud and Berg. He also asked Schoenberg for composition lessons. Schoenberg refused, saying "I would only make you a bad Schoenberg, and you're such a good Gershwin already." (This quote is similar to one credited to Ravel during Gershwin's 1928 visit to France – "Why be a second-rate Ravel, when you are a first-rate Gershwin?") Gershwin was particularly impressed by the music of Berg, who gave him a score of the Lyric Suite. He attended the American premiere of Berg's Wozzeck, conducted by Leopold Stokowski in 1931, and was "thrilled and deeply impressed".

Russian Joseph Schillinger's influence as Gershwin's teacher of composition (1932–1936) was substantial in providing him with a method of composition. There has been some disagreement about the nature of Schillinger's influence on Gershwin. After the posthumous success of Porgy and Bess, Schillinger claimed he had a large and direct influence in overseeing the creation of the opera; Ira completely denied that his brother had any such assistance for this work. A third account of Gershwin's musical relationship with his teacher was written by Gershwin's close friend Vernon Duke, also a Schillinger student, in an article for the Musical Quarterly in 1947.

What set Gershwin apart was his ability to manipulate forms of music into his own unique voice. He took the jazz he discovered on Tin Pan Alley into the mainstream by splicing its rhythms and tonality with that of the popular songs of his era. Although George Gershwin would seldom make grand statements about his music, he believed that "true music must reflect the thought and aspirations of the people and time. My people are Americans. My time is today."

In 1983, Broadway's Uris Theatre was renamed the Gershwin Theatre in honor of George and Ira Gershwin. In 2007, the Library of Congress named its Gershwin Prize for Popular Song after George and Ira Gershwin. Recognizing the profound and positive effect of popular music on culture, the prize is given annually to a composer or performer whose lifetime contributions exemplify the standard of excellence associated with the Gershwins. On March 1, 2007, the first Gershwin Prize was awarded to Paul Simon.

== Recordings and film ==
Early in his career, under both his own name and pseudonyms, Gershwin recorded more than one hundred forty player piano rolls which were a main source of his income. The majority were popular music of the period and a smaller proportion were of his own works. Once his musical theater-writing income became substantial, his regular roll-recording career became superfluous. He did record additional rolls throughout the 1920s of his main hits for the Aeolian Company's reproducing piano, including a complete version of his Rhapsody in Blue. Compared to the piano rolls, there are few accessible audio recordings of Gershwin's playing. His first recording was his own "Swanee" with the Fred Van Eps Trio in 1919. The recorded balance highlights the banjo playing of Van Eps, and the piano is overshadowed. The recording took place before "Swanee" became famous as an Al Jolson specialty in early 1920. Gershwin recorded an abridged version of Rhapsody in Blue with Paul Whiteman and his orchestra for the Victor Talking Machine Company in 1924, soon after the world premiere. Gershwin and the same orchestra made an electrical recording of the abridged version for Victor in 1927. However, a dispute in the studio over interpretation angered Whiteman and he walked out on the session. Victor's staff conductor and arranger Nathaniel Shilkret led the orchestra, though Whiteman is still credited as conductor on the original record labels.

Gershwin made a number of solo piano recordings of tunes from his musicals, some including the vocals of Fred and Adele Astaire, as well as his Three Preludes for piano. In 1929, Gershwin "supervised" the world premiere recording of An American in Paris with Nathaniel Shilkret and the Victor Symphony Orchestra. Gershwin's role in the recording was rather limited, particularly because Shilkret was conducting and had his own ideas about the music. When it was realized that no one had been hired to play the brief celeste solo, Gershwin was asked if he could and would play the instrument, and he agreed. Gershwin can be heard, rather briefly, on the recording during the slow section. Gershwin also appeared on several radio programs, including Rudy Vallee's, and played some of his compositions. This included the third movement of the Concerto in F with Vallee conducting the studio orchestra. Some of these performances were preserved on transcription discs and have been released on LP and CD.

In 1934, in an effort to earn money to finance his planned folk opera, Gershwin hosted his own radio program titled Music by Gershwin. The show was broadcast on the NBC Blue Network from February to May and again in September through the final show on December 23, 1934. He presented his own work as well as the work of other composers. Recordings from this and other radio broadcasts include his Variations on I Got Rhythm, portions of the Concerto in F, and numerous songs from his musical comedies. He also recorded a run-through of his Second Rhapsody, conducting the orchestra and playing the piano solos. Gershwin recorded excerpts from Porgy and Bess with members of the original cast, conducting the orchestra from the keyboard; he even announced the selections and the names of the performers. In 1935, RCA Victor asked him to supervise recordings of highlights from Porgy and Bess; these were his last recordings.

RCA Victor issued a 5 record 12-inch 78 rpm Memorial Album (C-29) recorded from the RCA Magic Key program broadcast on July 10, 1938, over the NBC Radio Network. It featured the Victor Salon Group, conducted by Nathaniel Shilkret, and singer Jane Froman. A 74-second newsreel film clip of Gershwin playing I Got Rhythm has survived, filmed at the opening of the Manhattan Theater (now The Ed Sullivan Theater) in August 1931. There are also silent home movies of Gershwin, some of them shot on Kodachrome color film stock, which have been featured in tributes to the composer. In addition, there is newsreel footage of Gershwin playing "Mademoiselle from New Rochelle" and "Strike Up the Band" on the piano during a Broadway rehearsal of the 1930 production of Strike Up the Band. In the mid-30s, "Strike Up The Band" was given to UCLA to be used as a football fight song, "Strike Up The Band for UCLA". The comedy team of Clark and McCullough are seen conversing with Gershwin, then singing as he plays.

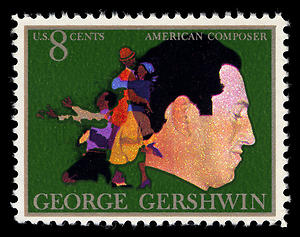
1973 U.S. commemorative stamp honoring Gershwin

In 1945, the film biography Rhapsody in Blue was made, starring Robert Alda as George Gershwin. The film contains many factual errors about Gershwin's life, but also features many examples of his music, including an almost complete performance of Rhapsody in Blue. In 1965, Movietone Records released an album MTM 1009 featuring Gershwin's piano rolls of the titled George Gershwin plays RHAPSODY IN BLUE and his other favorite compositions. The B-side of the LP featured nine other recordings. In 1975, Columbia Records released an album featuring Gershwin's piano rolls of Rhapsody in Blue, accompanied by the Columbia Jazz Band playing the original jazz band accompaniment, conducted by Michael Tilson Thomas. The B-side of the Columbia Masterworks release features Tilson Thomas leading the New York Philharmonic in An American in Paris. In 1976, RCA Records reissued a collection of Gershwin's original recordings on the album Gershwin plays Gershwin, Historic First Recordings (RCA Victrola AVM1-1740). Included was the first LP release of the 1924 recording of Rhapsody in Blue with the Paul Whiteman Orchestra and Gershwin on piano; An American in Paris, from 1929 conducted by Nathaniel Shilkret with Gershwin on celesta. Also included were Three Preludes, "Clap Yo' Hands" and "Someone to Watch Over Me", among others.

The soundtrack to Woody Allen's 1979 film Manhattan is composed entirely of Gershwin's compositions, including Rhapsody in Blue, "Love is Sweeping the Country", and "But Not for Me", performed by both the New York Philharmonic under Zubin Mehta and the Buffalo Philharmonic under Michael Tilson Thomas. The film begins with a monolog by Allen, in the role of a writer, describing a character in his book: "He adored New York City ... To him, no matter what the season was, this was still a town that existed in black and white and pulsated to the great tunes of George Gershwin." In 1993, two audio CDs featuring piano rolls recorded by Gershwin were issued by Nonesuch Records through the efforts of Artis Wodehouse, entitled Gershwin Plays Gershwin: The Piano Rolls. In 2010, Brian Wilson released Brian Wilson Reimagines Gershwin, consisting of ten George and Ira Gershwin songs, bookended by passages from Rhapsody in Blue, with two new songs completed from unfinished Gershwin fragments by Wilson and band member Scott Bennett.

== Balanchine's "Who Cares?" ==
In 1970, the New York City Ballet premiered Who Cares?, a ballet by George Balanchine to sixteen songs by Gershwin, orchestrated by Hershy Kay.

== Compositions ==
Orchestral

- Rhapsody in Blue for piano and orchestra (1924)
- Concerto in F for piano and orchestra (1925)
- An American in Paris for orchestra (1928)
- Dream Sequence/The Melting Pot for chorus and orchestra (1931)
- Second Rhapsody for piano and orchestra (1931), originally titled Rhapsody in Rivets
- Cuban Overture for orchestra (1932), originally entitled Rumba
- March from "Strike Up the Band" for orchestra (1934)
- Variations on "I Got Rhythm" for piano and orchestra (1934)
- Catfish Row for orchestra (1936), a suite based on music from Porgy and Bess
- Shall We Dance (1937), a movie score feature-length ballet

Solo piano

- Three Preludes (1926)
- George Gershwin's Song-book (1932), solo piano arrangements of 18 songs

Operas

- Blue Monday (1922), one-act opera
- Porgy and Bess (1935) at the Colonial Theatre in Boston

London musicals

- Primrose (1924)

Broadway musicals

- George White's Scandals (1920–1924), featuring, at one point, the 1922 one-act opera Blue Monday
- Lady, Be Good (1924)
- Tip-Toes (1925)
- Tell Me More! (1925)
- Oh, Kay! (1926)
- Strike Up the Band (1927)
- Funny Face (1927)
- Rosalie (1928)
- Treasure Girl (1928)
- Show Girl (1929)
- Girl Crazy (1930)
- Of Thee I Sing (1931)
- Pardon My English (1933)
- Let 'Em Eat Cake (1933)
- My One and Only (1983), an original 1983 musical using previously written Gershwin songs
- Crazy for You (1992), a revised version of Girl Crazy
- Nice Work If You Can Get It (2012), a musical with a score by George and Ira Gershwin
- An American in Paris, a musical that ran on Broadway from April 2015 to October 2016

Films for which Gershwin wrote original scores

- Delicious (1931), an early version of the Second Rhapsody and one other musical sequence was used in this film, the rest were rejected by the studio
- Shall We Dance (1937), original orchestral score by Gershwin, no recordings available in modern stereo, some sections have never been recorded (Nominated- Academy Award for Best Original Song: They Can't Take That Away from Me)
- A Damsel in Distress (1937)
- The Goldwyn Follies (1938), posthumously released
- The Shocking Miss Pilgrim (1947), used previously unpublished Gershwin songs and melodies revised by Kay Swift, with revised and new lyrics by Ira
- Kiss Me, Stupid (1964), used previously unpublished Gershwin songs and melodies revised by Roger Edens, with revised and new lyrics by Ira

== Legacy ==
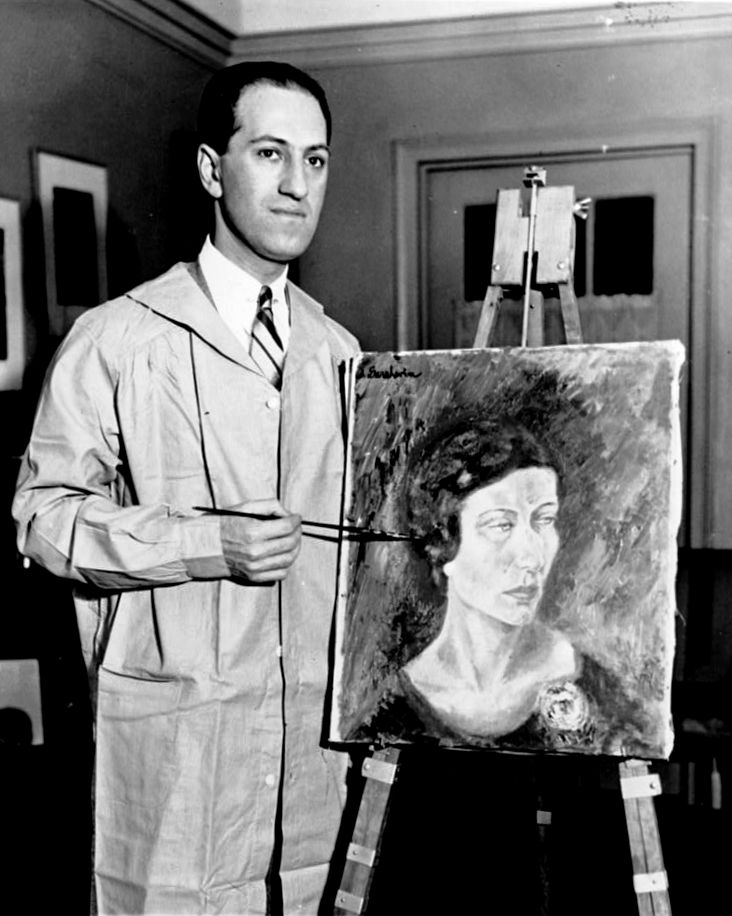
George Gershwin with one of his oil paintings, 1931

=== Estate ===
Gershwin died intestate, and his estate passed to his mother. The estate continues to collect royalties in the United States from licensing the copyrights on his post-Rhapsody in Blue work. The estate supported the Sonny Bono Copyright Term extension Act (that extended the U.S. 75-year copyright protection an additional 20 years) because its 1923 cutoff date was shortly before Gershwin had begun to create his most popular works. The copyrights on all Gershwin's solo works expired at the end of 2007 in the European Union, based on its life-plus-70-years rule, and in the U.S. on January 1, 2020, on Gershwin's pre-1925 work.

In 2005, The Guardian determined using "estimates of earnings accrued in a composer's lifetime" that George Gershwin was the wealthiest composer of all time.

The George and Ira Gershwin Collection, much of which was donated by Ira and the Gershwin family estates, resides at the Library of Congress.

In September 2013, a partnership between the estates of Ira and George Gershwin and the University of Michigan was created and will provide the university's School of Music, Theatre, and Dance access to Gershwin's entire body of work, which includes all of Gershwin's papers, compositional drafts, and scores. This direct access to all of his works provides opportunities to musicians, composers, and scholars to analyze and reinterpret his work with the goal of accurately reflecting the composers' vision to preserve his legacy. In 2023, The Gershwin Critical Edition, "the first-ever scholarly edition of the music and lyrics of George and Ira Gershwin", was published.

=== Awards and honors ===
- In 1937, Gershwin received his sole Academy Award nomination for Best Original Song at the 1937 Oscars for "They Can't Take That Away from Me", written with his brother Ira for the 1937 film Shall We Dance. The nomination was posthumous; Gershwin died two months after the film's release.
- In 1982, George Gershwin was inducted into the Jewish-American Hall of Fame.
- In 1985, the Congressional Gold Medal was awarded to George and Ira Gershwin. Only three other songwriters, George M. Cohan, Harry Chapin, and Irving Berlin, have received this award.
- In 1998 a special Pulitzer Prize was posthumously awarded to Gershwin "commemorating the centennial year of his birth, for his distinguished and enduring contributions to American music."
- The George and Ira Gershwin Lifetime Musical Achievement Award was established by UCLA to honor the brothers for their contribution to music and for their gift to UCLA of the fight song "Strike Up the Band for UCLA".
- In 2006, Gershwin was inducted into the Long Island Music Hall of Fame.
- In 2007, the Library of Congress created the Library of Congress Gershwin Prize for Popular Song (aka, Gershwin Prize) in honor of both George and Ira Gershwin.

=== Namesakes ===
- The Gershwin Theatre on Broadway is named after George and Ira.
- The Gershwin Hotel in the Flatiron District of Manhattan in New York City was named after George and Ira.
- In Brooklyn, George Gershwin Junior High School 166 is named after him.
- One of Holland America Line's ships, MS Koningsdam, has a Gershwin Deck (Deck 5)

=== Biopic ===
- The 1945 biographical film Rhapsody in Blue starred Robert Alda as George Gershwin.

=== Portrayals in other media ===
- In George Lucas's The Adventures of Young Indiana Jones a fictional George Gershwin appears as a friend of Indiana Jones in the made-for-TV movie from 1999, Scandal of 1920. He also briefly appears in Hollywood Follies. He is portrayed by Tom Beckett.
- Since 1999, Hershey Felder has produced a one-man show with him portraying George Gershwin Alone, which has played over 3,000 performances and won two 2007 Ovation Awards. In response to the COVID-19 pandemic, Felder launched a global live-streaming Hershey Felder Presents: Live from Florence featuring a performance of "Hershey Felder as George Gershwin Alone" in September 2020.
- Paul Rudd portrays an imaginary friend based on George Gershwin, said to be his creator's favorite composer, in the 2015 series finale of the Irish sitcom Moone Boy, "Gershwin's Bucket List".

== See also ==
- List of covers of Time magazine (1920s)
