= Gershwin Prize =

Music award sponsored by the US Library of Congress

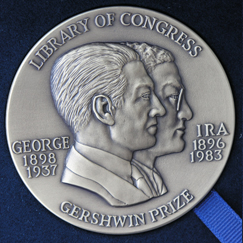
Obverse of the 2007 Library of Congress Gershwin Prize for Popular Song medal awarded to Paul Simon

The Library of Congress Gershwin Prize for Popular Song is an award given to a composer or performer for their lifetime contributions to popular music. Created in 2007 by the United States Library of Congress, the prize is named after brothers George and Ira Gershwin, whose contributions to popular music included songs such as "I Got Rhythm", "Embraceable You", and "Someone to Watch Over Me", the orchestral pieces Rhapsody in Blue and An American in Paris, and the opera Porgy and Bess.

== History ==
The national prize for popular song, eventually named the Gershwin Prize, was created by Peter Kaminsky, Bob Kaminsky, Cappy McGarr, Mark Krantz, and Dalton Delan, subsequent to their creation of the national humor award, the Kennedy Center Mark Twain Prize. The project was presented to the librarian, James Billington in 2003. The executive producers then secured a partnership with WETA, PBS, and CPB.

The librarian bestowed the first award in 2007 to recognize "the profound and positive effect of popular music on the world’s culture" as part of the library's mission to recognize and celebrate creativity. The recipient of the Gershwin Prize is said to "exemplify the standard of excellence associated with the Gershwins". In selecting the honoree, the librarian of Congress works with staff of the library's Music Division as well as the broader music community.

The award was not bestowed in 2010, 2013, 2018, or 2021.

=== 2007 Honoree: Paul Simon ===
On March 1, 2007, the library announced Paul Simon as the first honoree of the new award, which joins other awards bestowed by the library including the Living Legend and Kluge Prize.

Simon received the prize during a concert gala featuring his music at the Warner Theatre in Washington, D.C., on the evening of May 23, 2007. The event was nationally broadcast on PBS the evening of June 27, 2007.

Performers included Yolanda Adams, Marc Anthony, Shawn Colvin, The Dixie Hummingbirds, Jessy Dixon and the Jessy Dixon Singers, Jerry Douglas, Philip Glass, Alison Krauss, Ladysmith Black Mambazo, Lyle Lovett, Stephen Marley, Dianne Reeves, James Taylor, Grover and Elmo Stevie Wonder, and Buckwheat Zydeco, as well as Simon's former collaborator Art Garfunkel.

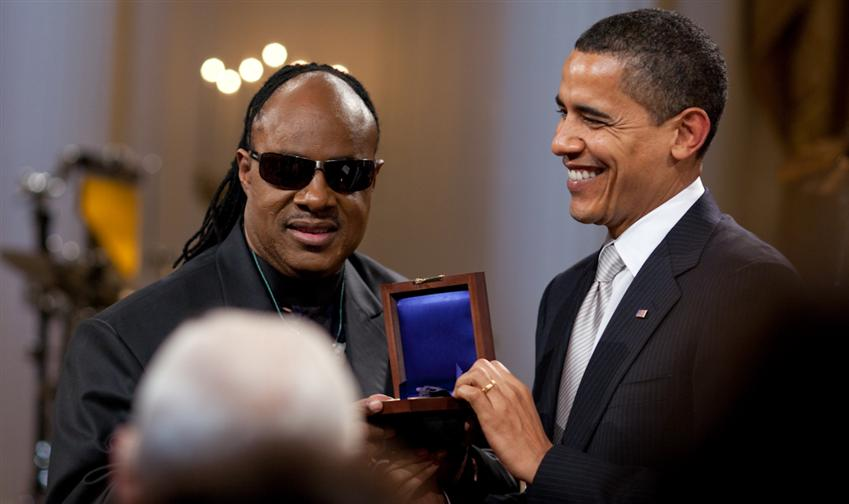
Stevie Wonder receiving the Gershwin Prize at the White House

=== 2008 Honoree: Stevie Wonder ===
On September 3, 2008, the library announced Stevie Wonder as the second recipient of the honor. President Barack Obama presented Wonder with the Library of Congress's Gershwin Prize at a February 25, 2009 White House ceremony.

Performers included Wonder as well as India.Arie, Tony Bennett, Wayne Brady, Anita Johnson, Diana Krall, Mary Mary, Martina McBride, Rickey Minor, Paul Simon, Esperanza Spalding and will.i.am.

=== 2009 Honoree: Sir Paul McCartney ===
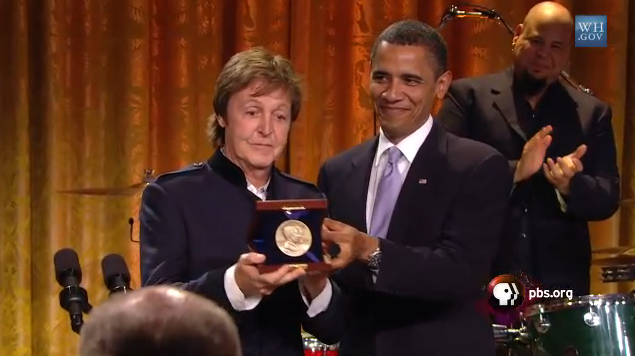
Paul McCartney receiving the Gershwin Prize from President Barack Obama

On November 18, 2009, the library announced Sir Paul McCartney as the third recipient of the honor.

The ceremony for McCartney was held June 2, 2010, in the East Room of the White House with President Obama and Mrs. Obama in attendance. Performers included McCartney as well as Stevie Wonder, Elvis Costello, Jonas Brothers, Herbie Hancock, Corinne Bailey Rae, Dave Grohl, Faith Hill, Emmylou Harris, Lang Lang and Jack White, with remarks by Jerry Seinfeld.

=== 2011 Honorees: Burt Bacharach & Hal David ===
On September 27, 2011, the library announced Burt Bacharach and Hal David as the fourth recipients of the honor.

The presentation ceremony was May 9, 2012, during a White House tribute concert (recorded for later broadcast on PBS) with the president and Mrs. Obama in attendance. Performers included Stevie Wonder, Diana Krall, Lyle Lovett, Sheléa, Rumer, Sheryl Crow, Mike Myers, Arturo Sandoval, and Michael Feinstein, who spoke of Ira Gershwin's admiration of the pair's songs. The singer most closely associated with the Bacharach-David songbook, Dionne Warwick, sang “This Guy’s in Love With You” which was not included in the PBS broadcast.

=== 2012 Honoree: Carole King ===
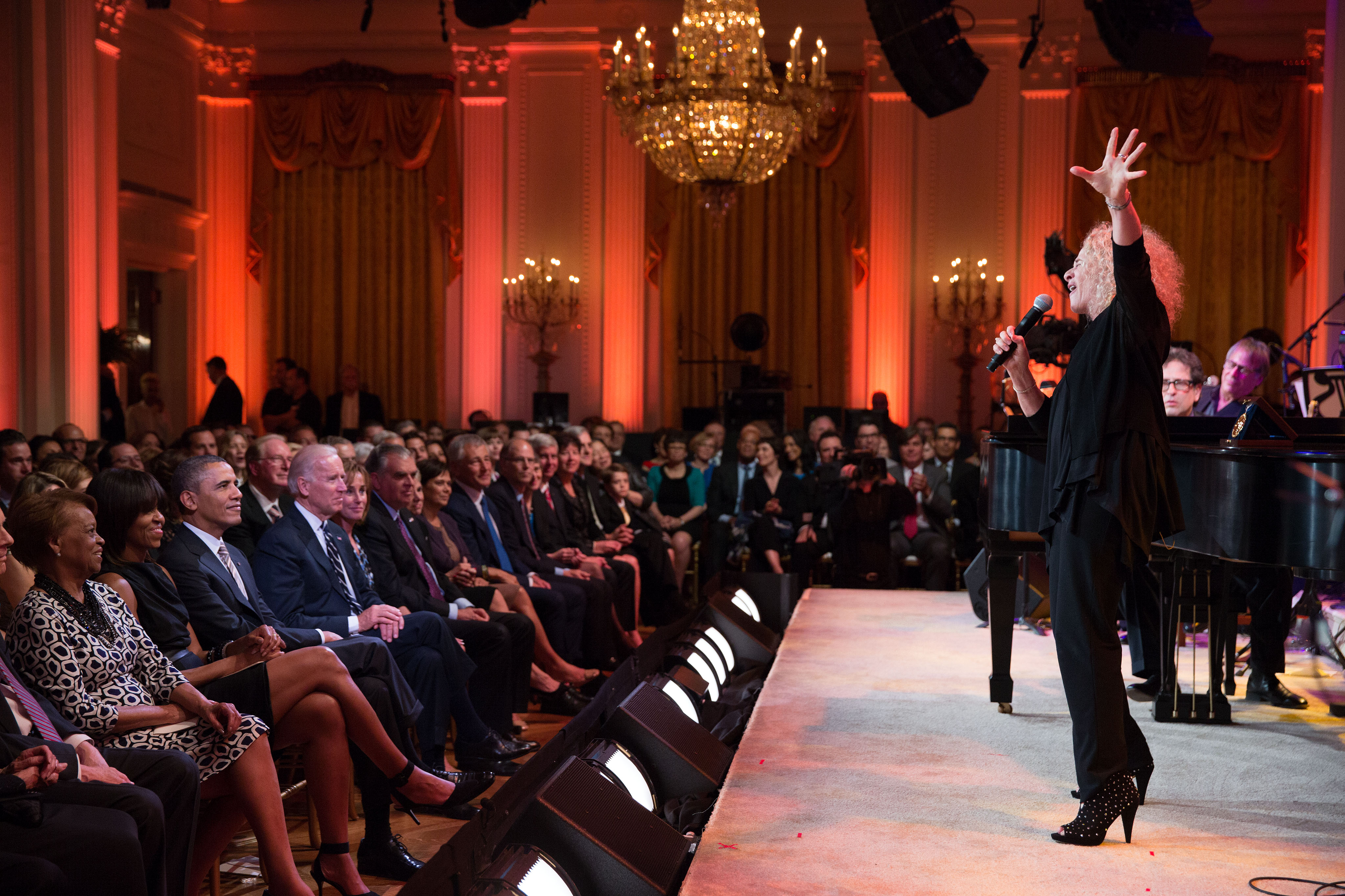
2013 honoree Carole King performing for president Barack Obama and others at the White House.

On December 13, 2012, Carole King became the honoree of the fifth Gershwin Prize, the first time it was awarded to a woman composer. On Tuesday, May 21, 2013, the library hosted an invitation-only concert at Coolidge Auditorium in honor of King. The all-star tribute included performances by Siedah Garrett, Colbie Caillat, Gian Marco, Shelby Lynne, Patti Austin, Arturo Sandoval and King's daughter, Louise Goffin.

The following night at the White House, the First Family joined King and star performers including James Taylor, Gloria Estefan, Emeli Sandé, Trisha Yearwood, Jesse McCartney and Billy Joel.

=== 2014 Honoree: Billy Joel ===
On July 22, 2014, Billy Joel was announced as the sixth honoree of the Gershwin Prize, named by the librarian of Congress under advisement of Library of Congress subject matter experts and an expanded advisory board that included Mary Chapin Carpenter (songwriter), Wesley Bulla (Belmont University), Anthony DeCurtis (Rolling Stone Magazine), Emilio Estefan (producer), Gregg Field (producer), Ed Hardy (CMA), Joel Katz (Global Entertainment), Stinson Liles (brand advisor), Rickey Minor (music director), Neil Portnow (President/CEO NARAS), Karen Sherry (ASCAP Foundation), Michael Strunsky (Ira and Leonore Gershwin Trusts) and Michelynn Woodard (Dr. Phil Foundation).

The honor ceremony along with a concert was held in Washington D.C. at DAR Constitution Hall November 19, 2014, and aired by PBS January 2, 2015. Kevin Spacey acted as emcee and Twyla Tharp (director of the Movin' Out musical) and Sir Paul McCartney gave special verbal tributes.

Performers included Boyz II Men ("The Longest Time"), Leann Rimes ("Lullabye (Goodnight, My Angel)"), Josh Groban ("She's Always a Woman"), Gavin DeGraw ("It's Still Rock and Roll to Me"), Michael Feinstein, Natalie Maines ("She's Got a Way"), John Mellencamp ("Allentown") and Tony Bennett ("New York State of Mind"). Joel ended the night by performing four songs: "Miami 2017 (Seen the Lights Go Out on Broadway)", "Vienna", "You May Be Right", and "Movin' Out (Anthony's Song))". The show's finale was Kevin Spacey leading the performers singing "Piano Man".

=== 2015 Honoree: Willie Nelson ===
Willie Nelson was named the 2015 honoree. The two-day celebration began with a presentation and special display on Tuesday, November 18, 2015, in the library’s historic Thomas Jefferson Building with a group of the nation’s lawmakers, who recognized Nelson for his contributions to popular music. The Library of Congress recognized Willie Nelson as the honoree of the seventh Gershwin Prize for Popular Song. Nelson was the first country music singer-songwriter to be awarded the prize.

=== 2016 Honoree: Smokey Robinson ===
Smokey Robinson was named the 2016 honoree.

=== 2017 Honoree: Tony Bennett ===
Tony Bennett was the 2017 honoree. The celebration for the beloved 91-year-old singer-songwriter began Wednesday afternoon, November 15, 2017, hosted by Bruce Willis in the Jefferson Building.

=== 2019 Honorees: Gloria & Emilio Estefan ===
The 2019 honorees of the prize were the husband-and-wife team of Gloria Estefan and Emilio Estefan. They received the prize in March 2019 at an all-star tribute concert in Washington, D.C. The concert aired on PBS stations nationwide.

=== 2020 Honoree: Garth Brooks ===
Garth Brooks was the 2020 honoree; he is the youngest recipient of the prize to date.

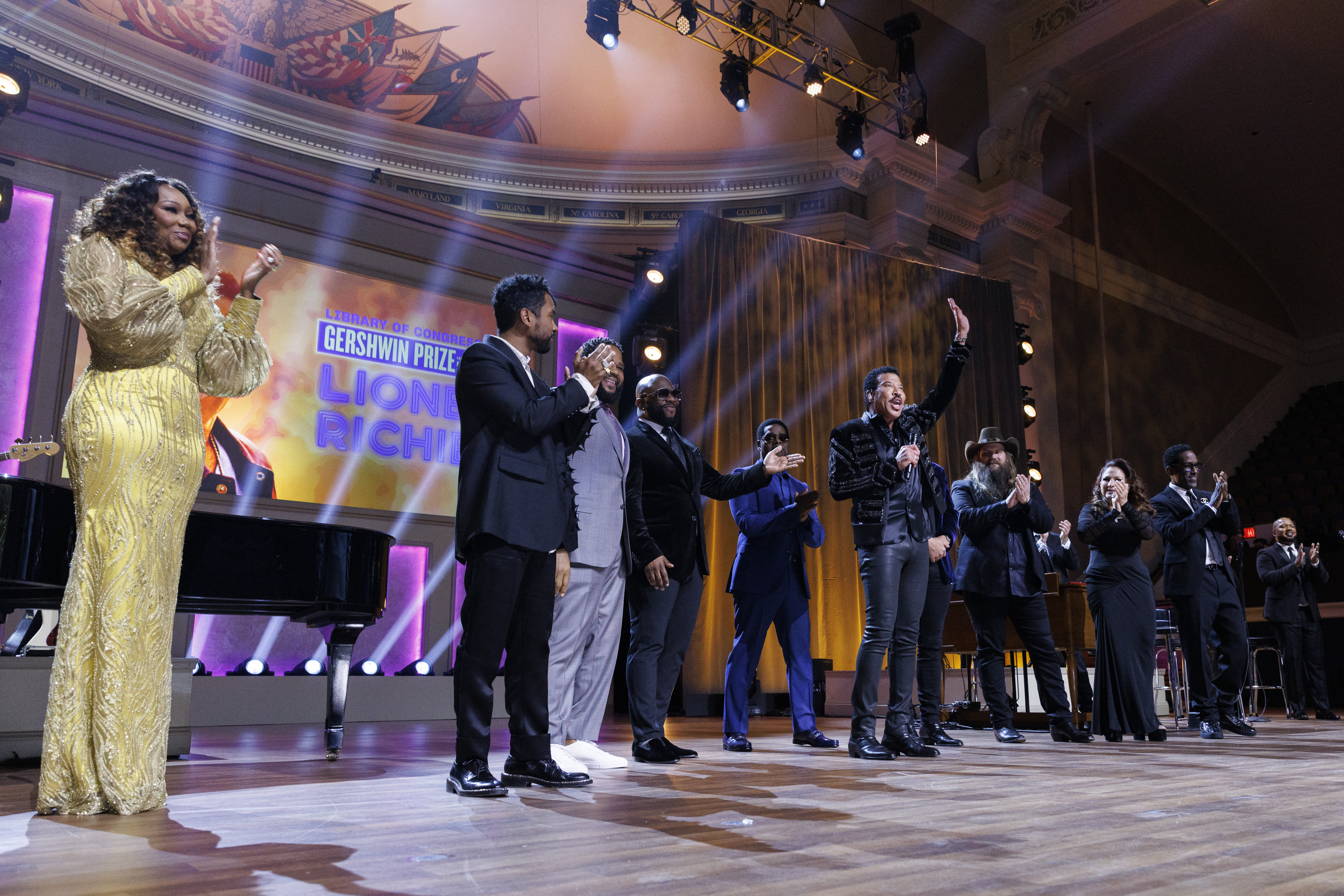
A group of performers on stage celebrating Lionel Richie at the 2022 ceremony.

=== 2022 Honoree: Lionel Richie ===
Lionel Richie was the 2022 honoree.

=== 2023 Honoree: Joni Mitchell ===
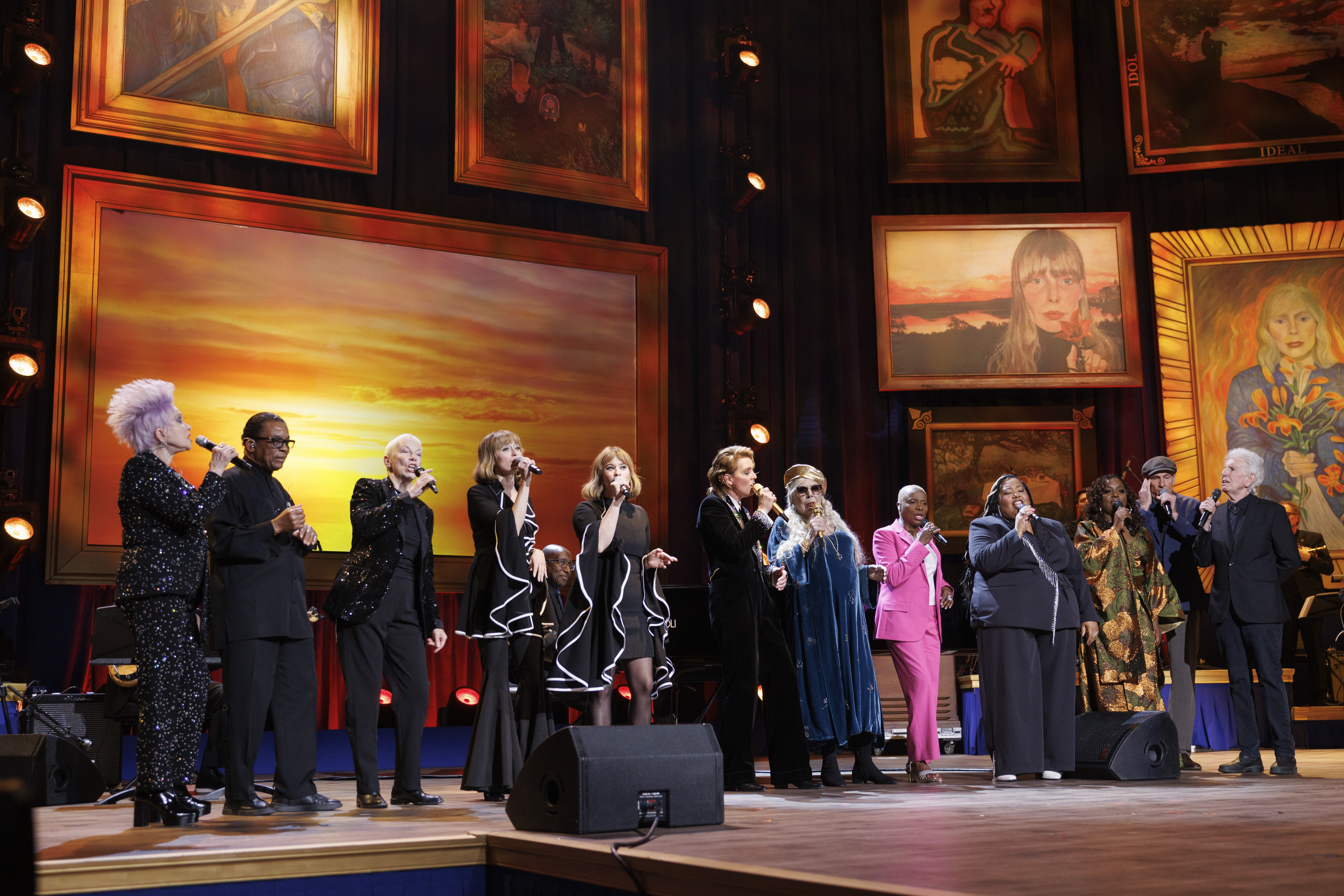
An all-star ensemble performs at the 2023 concert honoring Joni Mitchell.

Joni Mitchell was the 2023 honoree. She was celebrated with a concert delivered on March 2 in Washington, D.C.

Performers included Brandi Carlile, Annie Lennox, Angélique Kidjo, Herbie Hancock, Cyndi Lauper, Graham Nash, James Taylor, Ledisi, Lucius, Marcus Mumford, Sara Bareilles, and Celisse. Mitchell herself performed the George Gershwin song "Summertime" as well as participating in all-star renditions of her own compositions "Big Yellow Taxi" and "The Circle Game".

=== 2024 Honorees: Elton John & Bernie Taupin ===
A ceremony for 2024 honorees Elton John and Bernie Taupin was held on March 20, featuring performances from Garth Brooks, Brandi Carlile, Annie Lennox, Jacob Lusk, Metallica, Joni Mitchell, Maren Morris, Billy Porter and Charlie Puth.

== Honorees ==
Year	Inductee
2024	Elton John
2024	Bernie Taupin
2023	Joni Mitchell
2022	Lionel Richie
2020	Garth Brooks
2019	Gloria Estefan
2019	Emilio Estefan
2017	Tony Bennett
2016	Smokey Robinson
2015	Willie Nelson
2014	Billy Joel
2013	Carole King
2012	Burt Bacharach
2012	Hal David
2010	Paul McCartney
2009	Stevie Wonder
2007	Paul Simon
