= List of awards and nominations received by David Letterman =

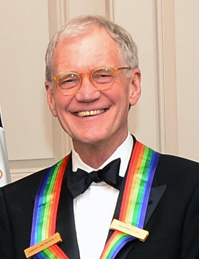
Award	Wins	Nominations
Daytime Emmy Awards	2	2
Primetime Emmy Awards	6	50

David Letterman is an American comedian and talk show host known for Late Night with David Letterman (1982–1993), Late Show with David Letterman (1993–2015) and My Next Guest Needs No Introduction with David Letterman (2018–present).

== Major associations ==
=== Daytime Emmy Awards ===
Year	Association	Category	Nominated work	Result	Ref.
1981	Daytime Emmy Awards	Outstanding Host or Hostess in a Variety Series	The David Letterman Show	Won	
1981	Daytime Emmy Awards	Outstanding Individual Achievement – Writers	The David Letterman Show	Won	

=== Primetime Emmy Awards ===
Year	Category	Nominated work	Result	Ref.
1984	Outstanding Writing in a Variety Or Music Program	Late Night with David Letterman	Won	
1984	Outstanding Variety, Music Or Comedy Program	Late Night with David Letterman	Nominated	
1985	Outstanding Writing in a Variety Or Music Program	Late Night with David Letterman	Won	
1985	Outstanding Variety, Music Or Comedy Program	Late Night with David Letterman	Nominated	
1986	Outstanding Writing in a Variety Or Music Program	Late Night with David Letterman	Won	
1986	Outstanding Variety, Music Or Comedy Program	Late Night with David Letterman	Nominated	
1987	Outstanding Writing in a Variety Or Music Program	Late Night with David Letterman	Won	
1987	Outstanding Variety, Music Or Comedy Program	Late Night with David Letterman	Nominated	
1988	Outstanding Writing in a Variety Or Music Program	Late Night with David Letterman	Nominated	
1988	Outstanding Variety, Music Or Comedy Program	Late Night with David Letterman	Nominated	
1990	Outstanding Writing in a Variety Or Music Program	Late Night with David Letterman	Nominated	
1990	Outstanding Variety, Music Or Comedy Series	Late Night with David Letterman	Nominated	
1991	Outstanding Writing in a Variety Or Music Program	Late Night with David Letterman	Nominated	
1991	Outstanding Variety, Music Or Comedy Program	Late Night with David Letterman	Nominated	
1992	Outstanding Variety, Music Or Comedy Program	Late Night with David Letterman	Nominated	
1992	Outstanding Individual Achievement in Writing in a Variety Or Music Program	Late Night with David Letterman	Nominated	
1993	Outstanding Variety, Music Or Comedy Series	Late Night with David Letterman	Nominated	
1993	Outstanding Individual Achievement in Writing in a Variety Or Music Program	Late Night with David Letterman	Nominated	
1994	Outstanding Variety, Music Or Comedy Series	Late Show with David Letterman	Won	
1994	Outstanding Individual Achievement in Writing in a Variety Or Music Program	Late Show with David Letterman	Nominated	
1995	Outstanding Writing for a Variety Or Music Series	Late Show with David Letterman	Nominated	
1995	Outstanding Individual Achievement in Writing in a Variety Or Music Program	Late Show with David Letterman	Nominated	
1996	Outstanding Writing in a Variety Or Music Program	Late Show with David Letterman	Nominated	
1996	Outstanding Writing for a Variety Or Music Series	Late Show with David Letterman	Nominated	
1997	Outstanding Writing in a Variety Or Music Program	Late Show with David Letterman	Nominated	
1998	Outstanding Writing in a Variety Or Music Program	Late Show with David Letterman	Nominated	
1998	Outstanding Performance in a Variety Or Music Program	Late Show with David Letterman	Nominated	
1999	Outstanding Writing in a Variety Or Music Program	Late Show with David Letterman	Nominated	
2000	Outstanding Writing in a Variety, Music or Comedy Program	Late Show with David Letterman	Nominated	
2000	Outstanding Writing in a Variety Or Music Program	Late Show with David Letterman	Nominated	
2001	Outstanding Writing in a Variety, Music or Comedy Program	Late Show with David Letterman	Nominated	
2001	Outstanding Individual Performance in a Variety Or Music Program	Late Show with David Letterman	Nominated	
2001	Outstanding Writing in a Variety Or Music Program	Late Show with David Letterman	Nominated	
2002	Outstanding Writing in a Variety, Music or Comedy Program	Late Show with David Letterman	Nominated	
2002	Outstanding Writing in a Variety Or Music Program	Late Show with David Letterman	Nominated	
2003	Outstanding Writing in a Variety, Music or Comedy Program	Late Show with David Letterman	Nominated	
2004	Outstanding Writing in a Variety, Music or Comedy Program	Late Show with David Letterman	Nominated	
2005	Outstanding Writing in a Variety, Music or Comedy Program	Late Show with David Letterman	Nominated	
2006	Outstanding Writing in a Variety, Music or Comedy Program	Late Show with David Letterman	Nominated	
2006	Outstanding Individual Performance in a Variety Or Music Program	Late Show with David Letterman	Nominated	
2007	Outstanding Writing in a Variety, Music or Comedy Program	Late Show with David Letterman	Nominated	
2007	Outstanding Individual Performance in a Variety Or Music Program	Late Show with David Letterman	Nominated	
2008	Outstanding Writing in a Variety, Music or Comedy Program	Late Show with David Letterman	Nominated	
2008	Outstanding Individual Performance in a Variety Or Music Program	Late Show with David Letterman	Nominated	
2009	Outstanding Writing in a Variety, Music or Comedy Program	Late Show with David Letterman	Nominated	
2009	Outstanding Variety, Music Or Comedy Series	Late Show with David Letterman	Nominated	
2015	Outstanding Variety Talk Series	Late Show with David Letterman	Nominated	

=== American Comedy Awards ===
Year	Category	Nominated work	Result	Ref.
1989	Funniest Male Performer in a TV Special	Late Night with David Letterman	Won	
1989	Outstanding Writing in a Variety Or Music Program	Late Night with David Letterman	Nominated	
1989	Outstanding Variety, Music Or Comedy Program	Late Night with David Letterman	Nominated	
1994	Funniest Male Performer in a TV Series	Late Night with David Letterman	Won	
1995	Funniest Male Performer in a TV Special	Late Night with David Letterman	Won	
2001	Funniest Male Performer in a TV Series	Late Night with David Letterman	Won	

=== The Comedy Awards ===
Year	Association	Category	Nominated work	Result	Ref.
2011	Late Show with David Letterman	The Comedy Awards	Johnny Carson Comedy Award	Won	

== Honors ==
=== Kennedy Center Honors ===
Year	Association	Category	Nominated work	Result	Ref.
2012	Kennedy Center Honors	Recipient	David Letterman	Won	

=== Mark Twain Prize for American Humor ===
Year	Association	Category	Nominated work	Result	Ref.
2017	Mark Twain Prize for American Humor	Recipient	David Letterman	Won	

=== Peabody Awards ===
Year	Association	Category	Nominated work	Result	Ref.
2015	Peabody Award	Individual Award	David Letterman	Won	
