= Julia Louis-Dreyfus: The Kennedy Center Mark Twain Prize for American Humor =

- Genre: Variety
- Written by: Jon Macks; Paul Greenberg; Carol Leifer; Sara Schaefer; Jeff Stilson
- Directed by: Troy Miller
- Starring: Julia Louis-Dreyfus; Jerry Seinfeld; Tina Fey; Stephen Colbert; Bryan Cranston; Tony Hale; Lisa Kudrow; Keegan-Michael Key; Kumail Nanjiani; Abbi Jacobson; Ilana Glazer
- Country of origin: United States
- Original language: English

Production
- Running time: 85 minutes

Original release
- Network: PBS
- Release: November 19, 2018

Julia Louis-Dreyfus: The Kennedy Center Mark Twain Prize for American Humor was a variety special that aired November 19, 2018 on PBS. The show honored actress and comedian Julia Louis-Dreyfus who was being awarded with the Mark Twain Prize for American Humor which was presented at the John F. Kennedy Center for the Performing Arts in Washington D.C. The event was filmed and shown on PBS and features clips for her performances throughout her career. It remains the highest honor a comedian can receive.

Louis-Dreyfus is an actress and comedian known for a variety of comedic performances on television and film. She started her career as a cast member on Saturday Night Live (1982–1985) before gaining stardom as Elaine Benes on the NBC sitcom Seinfeld (1990–1998). She has since starred in The New Adventures of Old Christine (2006–2010) and Veep (2012–2019).

Numerous collaborators and friends helped celebrate her accomplishments included Jerry Seinfeld, Larry David, Tina Fey, Stephen Colbert, Bryan Cranston, Tony Hale, Lisa Kudrow, Keegan-Michael Key, Kumail Nanjiani, Abbi Jacobson, and Ilana Glazer. Jack Johnson served as the musical guest performing his own song, "Better Together".

== History ==
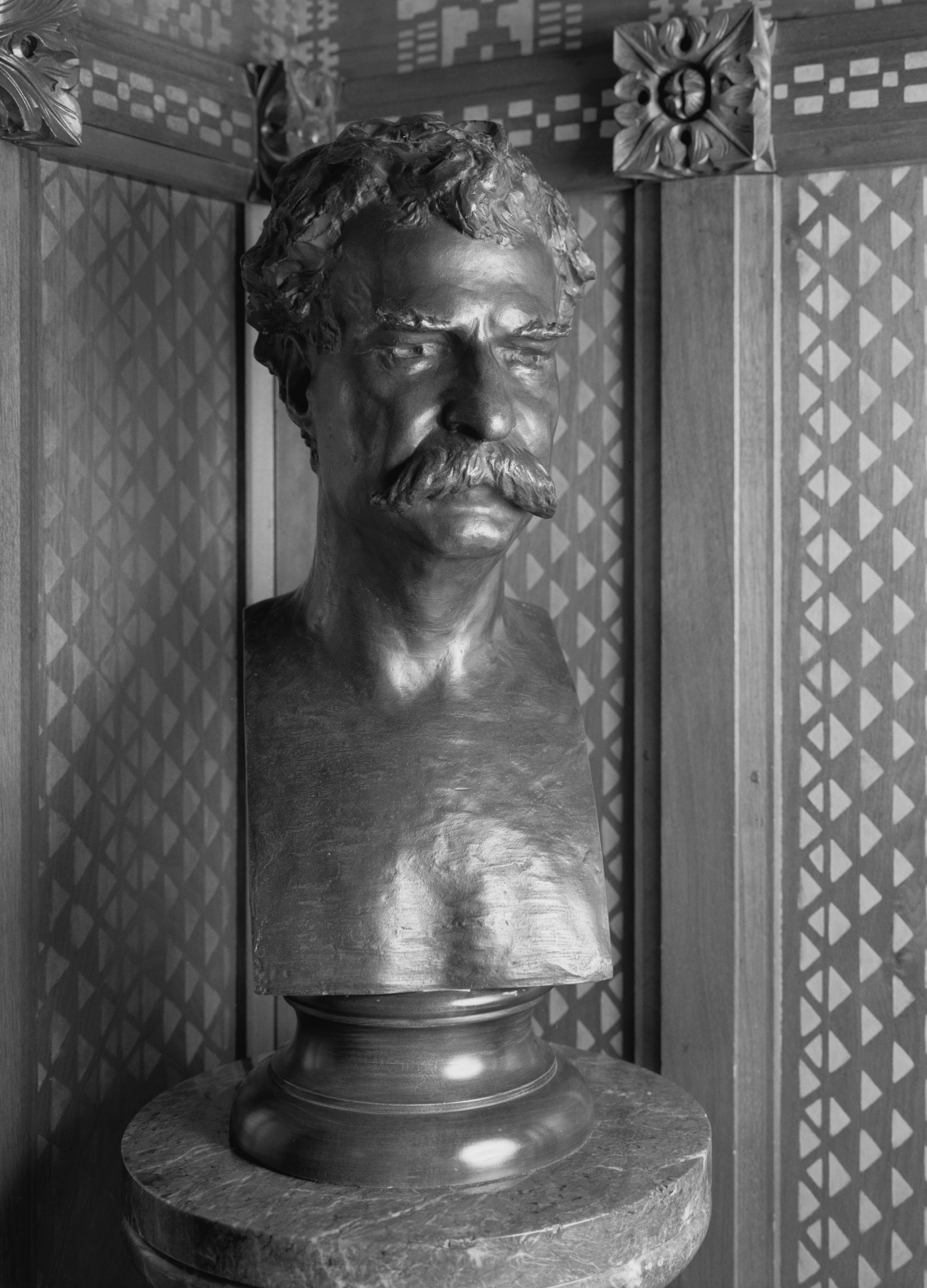
the bust of the Mark Twain Prize

The ceremony was dedicated to the 21st recipient of the Mark Twain Prize for American Humor, Julia Louis-Dreyfus. The first recipient of this award was given to Richard Pryor in 1998 and other winners have included Bob Newhart, George Carlin, Billy Crystal, Steve Martin, Lorne Michaels, Bill Murray, Eddie Murphy. She is the sixth woman to receive this award after Whoopi Goldberg, Lily Tomlin, Tina Fey, Ellen DeGeneres, and Carol Burnett.

The award, named after the 19th-century humorist Mark Twain who famously wrote American classics such as The Adventures of Tom Sawyer (1876), and The Adventures of Huckleberry Finn (1884). The award is presented to individuals who have "had an impact on American society in ways similar to" Twain. The award was presented at the John F. Kennedy Center for the Performing Arts in Washington, D.C., where it has been presented annually since 1998.

Louis-Dreyfus is an actress and comedian known for a variety of comedic performances on television and film. She started her career as a cast member on Saturday Night Live (1982–1985) before gaining stardom as Elaine Benes on the NBC sitcom Seinfeld (1990–1998). She has since starred in the CBS sitcom The New Adventures of Old Christine (2006–2010) and the HBO political satirical series Veep (2012–2019). Over her career she has received numerous accolades including 11 Primetime Emmy Awards, a Golden Globe Award, and 9 Screen Actors Guild Awards.

== Performers ==
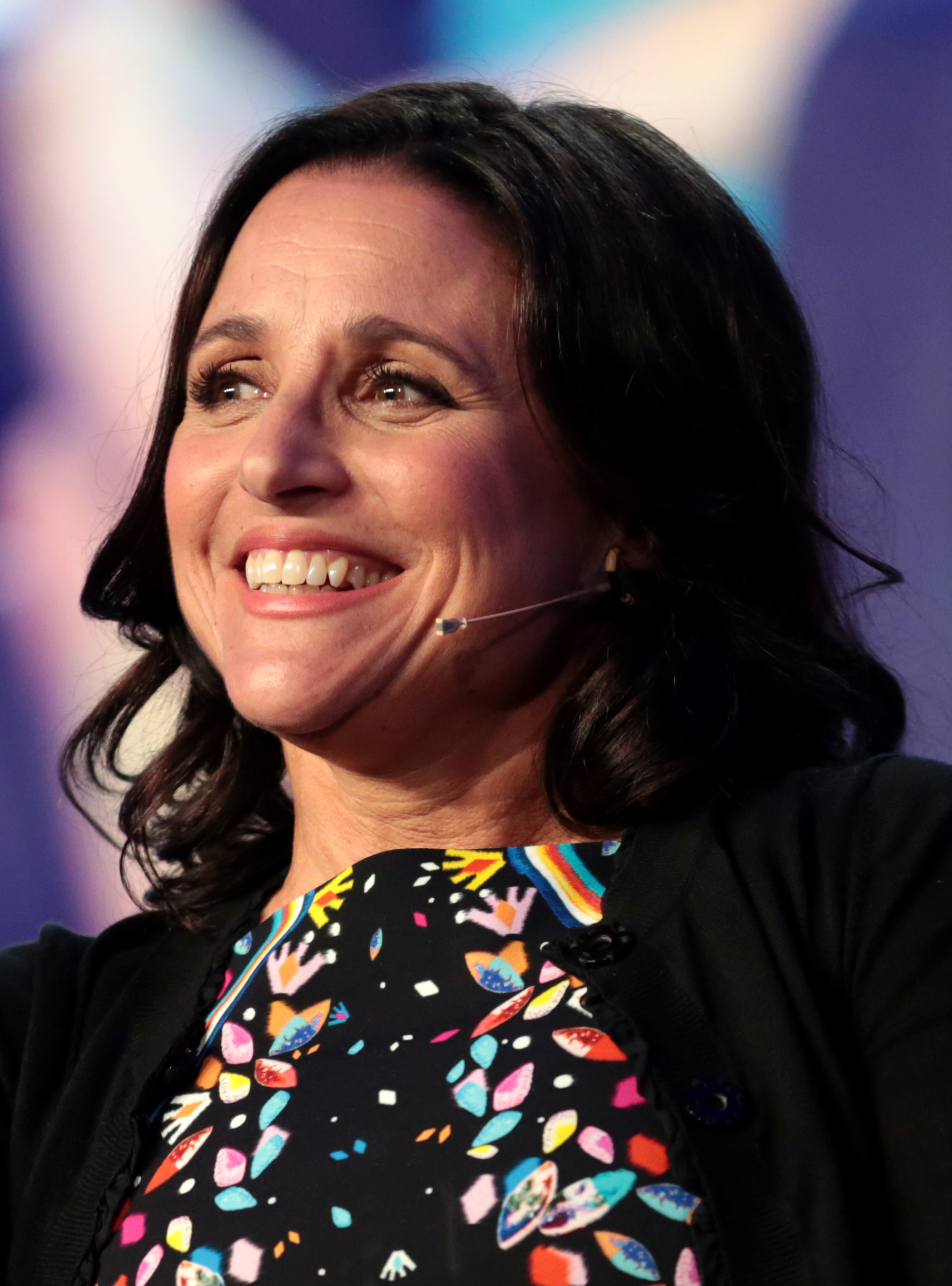
Julia Louis-Dreyfus in 2017.

=== In order of appearance ===
Performer	Notes
Stephen Colbert	Colbert talked about his love for her work on the HBO political satire series Veep.
Tina Fey	Fey spoke about the influence Louis-Dreyfus had on her career
Keegan-Michael Key	Key made comedic remarks as Mark Twain
Bryan Cranston	Cranston talked about his experiences playing the dentist Tim Whatley on Seinfeld
Abbi Jacobson and Ilana Glazer	Talked about her influence on their Comedy Central series Broad City
Lisa Kudrow	Joked about losing the Primetime Emmy Award to Louis-Dreyfus
Kumail Nanjiani	Spoofs TedTalk by giving a TwainTalk on why she would make a good President
Tony Hale	Talked about his experience working opposite her as Gary Walsh on Veep
Jerry Seinfeld	Shared stories of his personal and professional relationship with her and how she was cast on Seinfeld
David Rubenstein	Kennedy Center chairman presented her with the prize

=== Musical performances ===
- Jack Johnson performed his song "Better Together".

=== Pre-taped ===
- Steve Carell
- Larry David
- Ellie Kemper
- David Letterman
- Amy Poehler
- George Shapiro

=== In the audience ===
- Brad Hall
- Emily V. Gordon

== Production ==
David Letterman opened the show in a pre-taped sketch where he is resistant to give up the Mark Twain Prize. Those who helped celebrate his accomplishments included Jerry Seinfeld, Larry David, Tina Fey, Stephen Colbert, Bryan Cranston, Tony Hale, Lisa Kudrow, Keegan-Michael Key, Kumail Nanjiani, Abbi Jacobson, and Ilana Glazer. Jack Johnson served as the musical guest performing his song "Better Together". Those who praised her in pre-taped clips included George Shapiro, Ellie Kemper, Amy Poehler, and Steve Carell. The event was filmed and shown on PBS and features clips for her performances throughout her career.

Larry David praised her in a pre-taped clip saying "Working with her was like being in charge of the Hope diamond". In her acceptance speech, she acknowledged her health issues as she was diagnosed with breast cancer and stated, "So the fact that I have had the opportunity to make people laugh for a living is one of the many blessings that I have received in my life". Dreyfus made a few political jokes aimed at Donald Trump, and Brett Kavanaugh which were removed from the PBS telecast.
