= Cappy McGarr =

American entrepreneur and producer

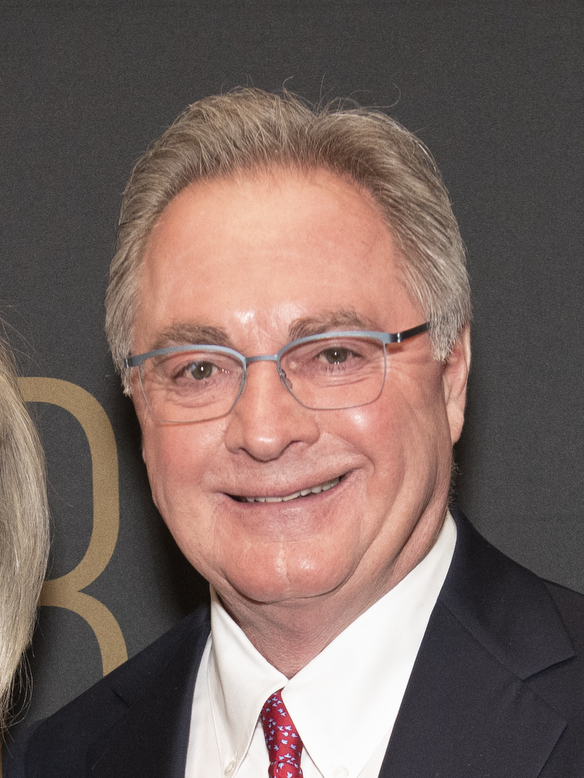
- Cappy McGarr in 2020.
- Occupation: Entrepreneur, producer, author
- Language: English
- Education: University of Texas at Austin
- Spouse: Janie Strauss McGarr
- Children: 2
- Relatives: Annette Strauss Robert S. Strauss

Cappy McGarr is an American entrepreneur, fundraiser, author, and Emmy-nominated producer based in Dallas, Texas. He is a co-creator of the Kennedy Center Mark Twain Prize for American Humor, as well as the Library of Congress Gershwin Prize for Popular Song. He was appointed to the board of trustees of the John F. Kennedy Center for the Performing Arts by President Bill Clinton in 1996, and re-appointed by President Barack Obama in 2011. He has also produced several shows for PBS’s In Performance at the White House series.

== Early life and career ==
McGarr attended the University of Texas at Austin, where he received a Bachelor of Arts in 1973, a Bachelor of Journalism in 1975, and a Master's in Business Administration in 1977.

In 1996, McGarr was appointed by President Bill Clinton to the John F. Kennedy Center for the Performing Arts's Board of Trustees for a six-year term. During that time, McGarr helped create the inaugural Mark Twain Prize ceremony in 1998 honoring Richard Pryor. McGarr then served as an executive producer on subsequent Mark Twain Prize ceremonies, extending after his term on the Kennedy Center board was complete.

McGarr also co-created the Library of Congress Gershwin Prize for Popular Song, which was first awarded in 2007 to Paul Simon, and has since been given to Stevie Wonder, Paul McCartney, Hal David, Burt Bacharach, Carole King and more.

For his work on the Kennedy Center Mark Twain Prize ceremony honoring George Carlin, McGarr received an Emmy Award nomination in 2009 in the category of Outstanding Special Class Programs. He was also nominated for a 2010 NAACP Image Award in the Outstanding Variety category for the 2009 Mark Twain Prize.

President Barack Obama re-appointed McGarr to the Kennedy Center board in 2011, making McGarr one of only two people at the time to receive that appointment from multiple presidents.

McGarr has served on the board of the Foundation for the National Archives and currently serves on the board of the Lyndon Baines Johnson Foundation and the MD Anderson Cancer Center Board of Visitors. He is also a member of the Council on Foreign Relations.

In 2021, McGarr published a memoir about his life and the founding of the Mark Twain Prize titled The Man Who Made Mark Twain Famous: Stories from the Kennedy Center, the White House, and Other Comedy Venues.

In 2024, McGarr was honored as a recipient of the Distinguished Alumnus Award by the University of Texas at Austin.

In 2025, President Joe Biden awarded McGarr the National Medal of Arts on his last full day in office.

== Personal life ==
McGarr married Janie Strauss in 1978, and they live together in Dallas, Texas. They have two children, Elizabeth McGarr McCue and Kathryn McGarr, as well as two grandchildren.

== Works ==
- A Texas-Size Health Care Failure (The New York Times, 2009)
- Why Washington Needs a Laugh (Politico, 2011)
- Coronavirus Is No Joke, But It’s Why Comedy Must Go On (USA Today, 2020)
- The Man Who Made Mark Twain Famous: Stories from the Kennedy Center, the White House, and Other Comedy Venues (Simon & Schuster, 2021)
- Sis Boom Baa!: The Adventures of Princess Lil' Cap and Sir Hud the Brave (Simon & Schuster, 2024)
