= Adam Sandler: The Kennedy Center Mark Twain Prize for American Humor =

2025 television special

- Genre: Variety special
- Directed by: Marcus Raboy
- Starring: Adam Sandler
- Country of origin: United States
- Original language: English

Production
- Running time: 96 minutes

Original release
- Network: CNN
- Release: March 23, 2023

Adam Sandler: The Kennedy Center Mark Twain Prize for American Humor is a filmed television special honoring comedian, writer, and actor Adam Sandler who was the 24th recipient of the Mark Twain Prize for American Humor. Sandler started his career as a stand-up before gaining fame as a sketch performer on the NBC series Saturday Night Live from 1990 to 1995. He has since gone on to star in numerous Hollywood studio comedy films that cumulatively grossed over $2 billion worldwide.

The ceremony was pre-taped and aired on March 23, 2023, at the John F. Kennedy Center for the Performing Arts where he was honored by his fellow comedian friends and collaborators such as Jennifer Aniston, Judd Apatow, Drew Barrymore, Steve Buscemi, Dana Carvey, Pete Davidson, Idina Menzel, Tim Meadows, Conan O'Brien, Chris Rock, Rob Schneider, David Spade, and Ben Stiller.

== History ==
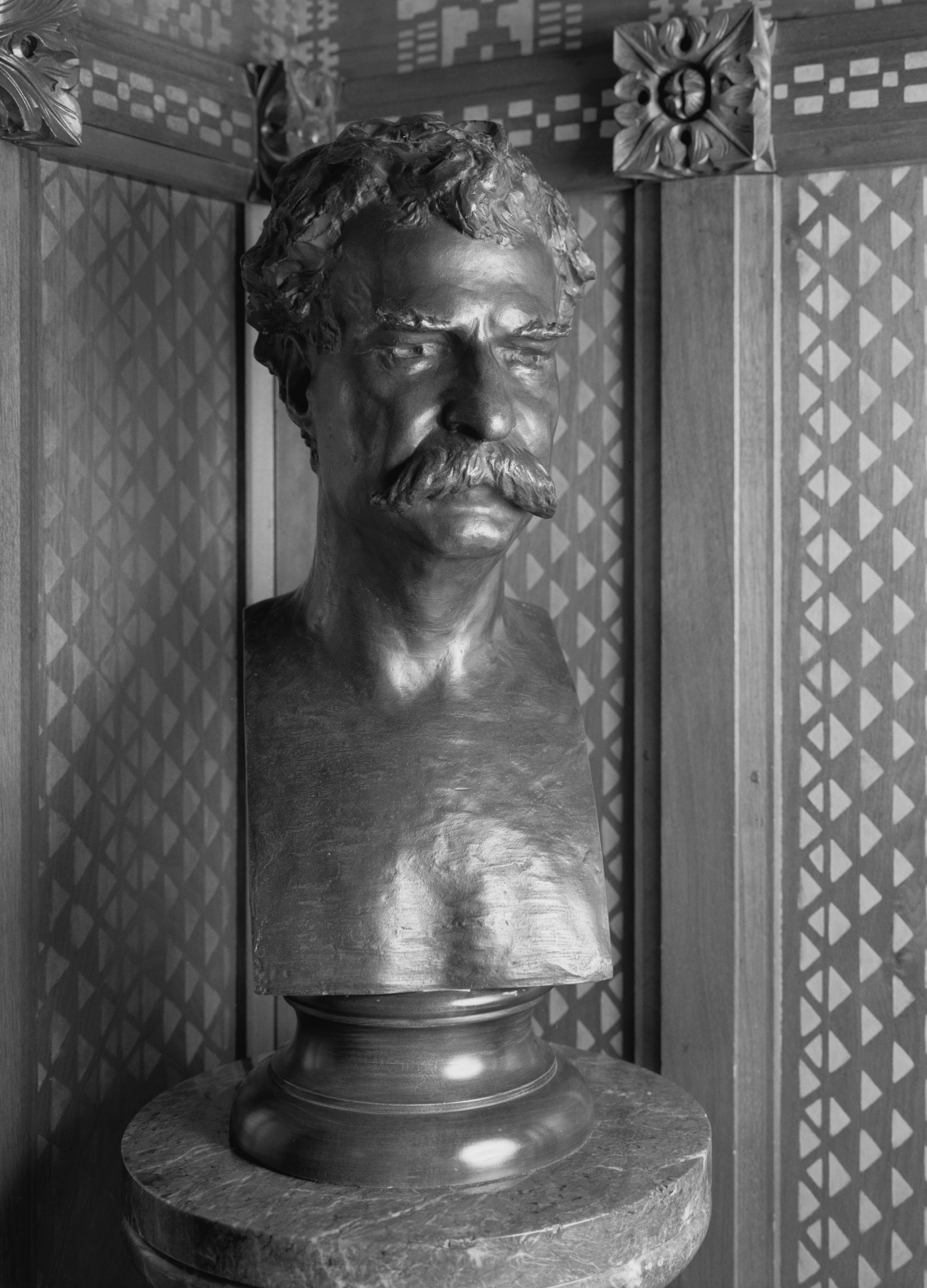
the bust of the Mark Twain Prize for American Humor

The ceremony was dedicated to the 24th recipient of the Mark Twain Prize for American Humor, Adam Sandler. The first recipient of this award was given to Richard Pryor in 1998 and has since been awarded to numerous comedians such as Bob Newhart, Whoopi Goldberg, Billy Crystal, Steve Martin, Tina Fey, Carol Burnett, Bill Murray, Jon Stewart, Julia Louis-Dreyfus, and Dave Chappelle. The prize remains the highest honor a comedian can receive.

The award, named after the 19th-century humorist Mark Twain who famously wrote American classics such as The Adventures of Tom Sawyer (1876), and The Adventures of Huckleberry Finn (1884). The award is presented to individuals who have "had an impact on American society in ways similar to" Twain. The award was presented at the John F. Kennedy Center for the Performing Arts in Washington, D.C., where it has been presented annually since 1998.

== Production ==
Sandler started his career as a stand-up before gaining fame as a sketch performer on the NBC series Saturday Night Live from 1990 to 1995. He has since gone on to star in numerous Hollywood studio comedy films that cumulatively grossed over $2 billion worldwide. Kennedy Center President Deborah F. Rutter in a statement, "Adam Sandler has entertained audiences for over three decades with his films, music, and his tenure as a fan favorite cast member on SNL, Adam has created characters that have made us laugh, cry, and cry from laughing."

The ceremony was pre-taped and aired on March 23, 2025, at the John F. Kennedy Center for the Performing Arts, and the special included pre-taped segments and archival footage. Sandler was honored by his fellow Saturday Night Live collaborators such as Chris Rock, Dana Carvey, David Spade, Conan O'Brien, Ben Stiller, Tim Meadows, Rob Schneider, and Pete Davidson as well as friends Luis Guzmán, Tim Herlihy, Idina Menzel, Jennifer Aniston, Judd Apatow, Drew Barrymore, and Steve Buscemi.

== Ceremony ==
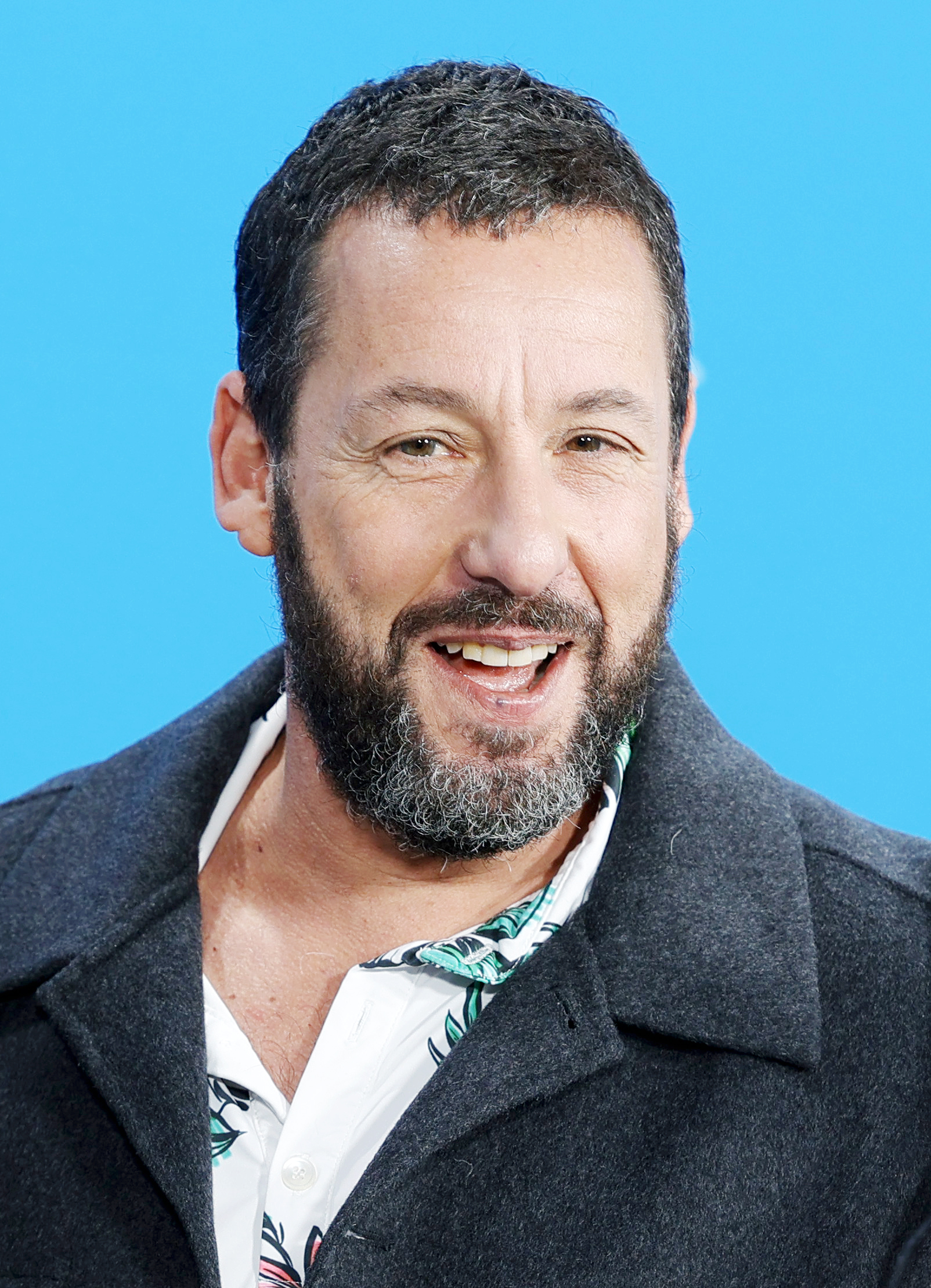
Sandler in 2024

=== Performers ===
In order of appearance

Performer	Notes
Conan O'Brien	O'Brien made jokes at about how undeserving of the Mark Twain Prize
Ben Stiller	Stiller talked working with Sandler on Saturday Night Live and pitched Grown Ups 3
Judd Apatow	Apatow talked about his relationship with Sandler during his pre-Hollywood fame
Steve Buscemi	Buscemi jokingly acted drunk roasting and mocking Sandler
Judy Sandler	Sandler's mom talked about her memories of him as a child
Tim Meadows	Served as the announcer and joked about the Mark Twain Prize statue
Drew Barrymore and Jennifer Aniston	Barrymore and Aniston talked competitively about being romantic interests in Sandler's films.
David Spade	Spade joked about Sandler's success
Luis Guzmán	Guzmán talked about working with him on Punch-Drunk Love (2002) and Mr. Deeds (2002)
Dana Carvey	Carvey joked about Lorne Michaels first reaction to Sandler on SNL
Pete Davidson	Davidson shared about memory of when he first met Sandler
Tim Herlihy	Talked about the legacy of Sandler from his movies and SNL characters
Chris Rock	Shares a brief joke about him and Paul Pelosi and talks about his friendship with Sandler
Jackie Sandler	Talked about when she first met him in 1998 and her marriage with Sandler
Rob Schneider	Talks about Sandler's friendship and loyalty
David Rubenstein	Presents Sandler with the Mark Twain Prize

=== Musical performance ===
- Idina Menzel performed a comedic song as Opera Man
- Dana Carvey performed a series of comedic songs
- Rob Schneider performed, "Grow Old With You" from The Wedding Singer

=== Pre-taped ===
- Terry Crews
- Eugenio Derbez
- Brendan Fraser
- Josh Gad
- Alana, Danielle, and Este Haim
- Jon Lovitz
- Kevin Nealon
- Molly Shannon
- Sarah Silverman
- Robert Smigel
- Carl Weathers
- Henry Winkler

=== In the audience ===
- Will Forte
- Nikki Glaser
- Nancy and Paul Pelosi
- Andy Samberg
- Horatio Sanz
- Ted Sarandos
- Lakeith Stanfield

== Reception ==
Andy Hoglund of Entertainment Weekly wrote, "While many of the presenters who honored Adam Sandler with the Mark Twain Prize for American Humor at the recent John F. Kennedy Center ceremony mimicked the comedian and actor's penchant for gibberish and mumbling, one thing was clear: outside the laughs, Sandler is recognized for his decency, loyalty, and strong work ethic."
