= Mark Twain Prize for American Humor =

American award for the Performing Arts

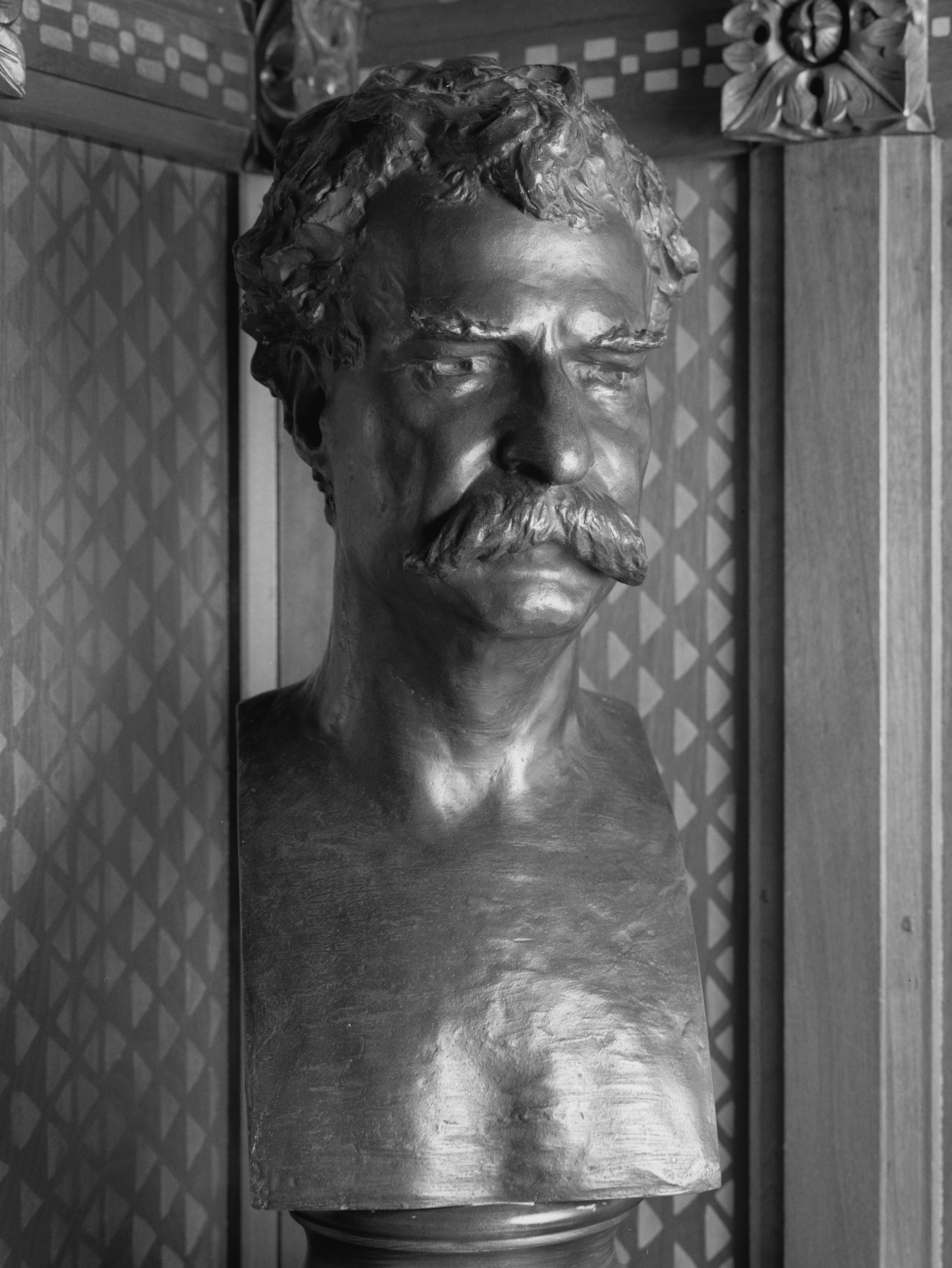
- The Kennedy Center award is modeled after Karl Gerhardt's bronze bust of Twain.
- Awarded for: having "had an impact on American society in ways similar to" Mark Twain
- Location: Washington, D.C.
- Country: United States
- Presented by: John F. Kennedy Center for the Performing Arts
- First award: 1998
- Most recent recipient: Bill Maher (2026)
- Website: Official website

Television coverage
- Network: Comedy Central (1998–1999); PBS (2000–2022); CNN (2023); Netflix (2024–present)

The Mark Twain Prize for American Humor is an American award presented by the John F. Kennedy Center for the Performing Arts in Washington, D.C. annually since 1998 (except 2020–2021). Named after the 19th-century humorist Mark Twain, it is presented to individuals who have "had an impact on American society in ways similar to" Twain. The Kennedy Center chose Twain in recognition of his role as a controversial social commentator and his "uncompromising perspective of social injustice and personal folly." A copy of Karl Gerhardt's 1884 bust of Twain is presented in a ceremony usually in the Kennedy Center Concert Hall, during which the recipient is celebrated by his or her peers. The event is a significant fundraiser to benefit the Kennedy Center, which sells tickets as well as access to dinners and after-parties featuring the celebrities.

As of 2025, 26 individuals have been awarded the award: 20 men and 6 women (Bill Cosby's award was rescinded by the Kennedy Center in 2018). Due to the COVID-19 pandemic, there were no awards in 2020 or 2021.

== History ==
=== 1997–1999 ===
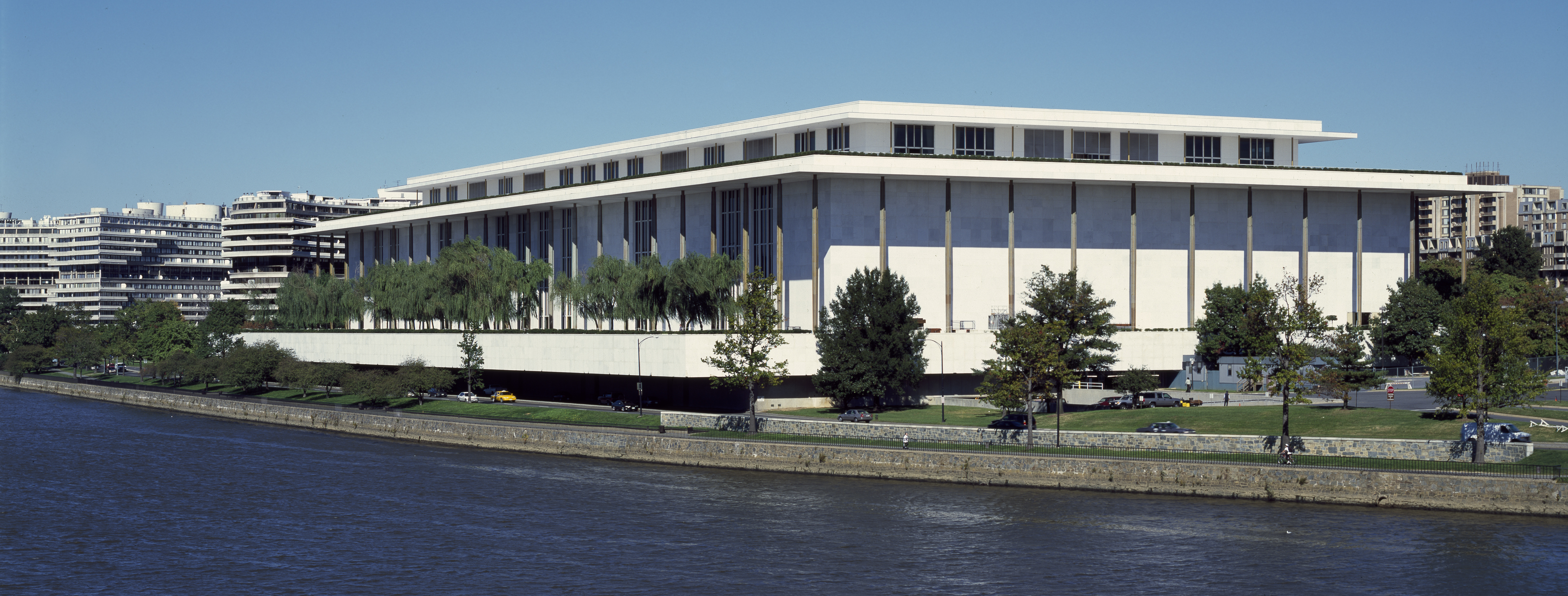
Venue, the Kennedy Center

In 1997, Murray Horwitz brought the idea of a dedicated comedy award, on par with the Oscars, Grammy Awards or Tony Awards, to John Schreiber and Mark Krantz, partners in an entertainment firm. The original conceptualization was an award which would celebrate one comedian, unlike the Kennedy Center Honors, which were more all-encompassing, and the venue would be the White House. They took the idea to Ann Stock, then the White House social secretary. The White House was considered an inappropriate venue at the time, so the Kennedy Center was suggested. Bob Kaminsky, Peter Kaminsky and Cappy McGarr were brought onboard and Comedy Central would coproduce and broadcast the show. At this stage it was decided to name the prize after Mark Twain.

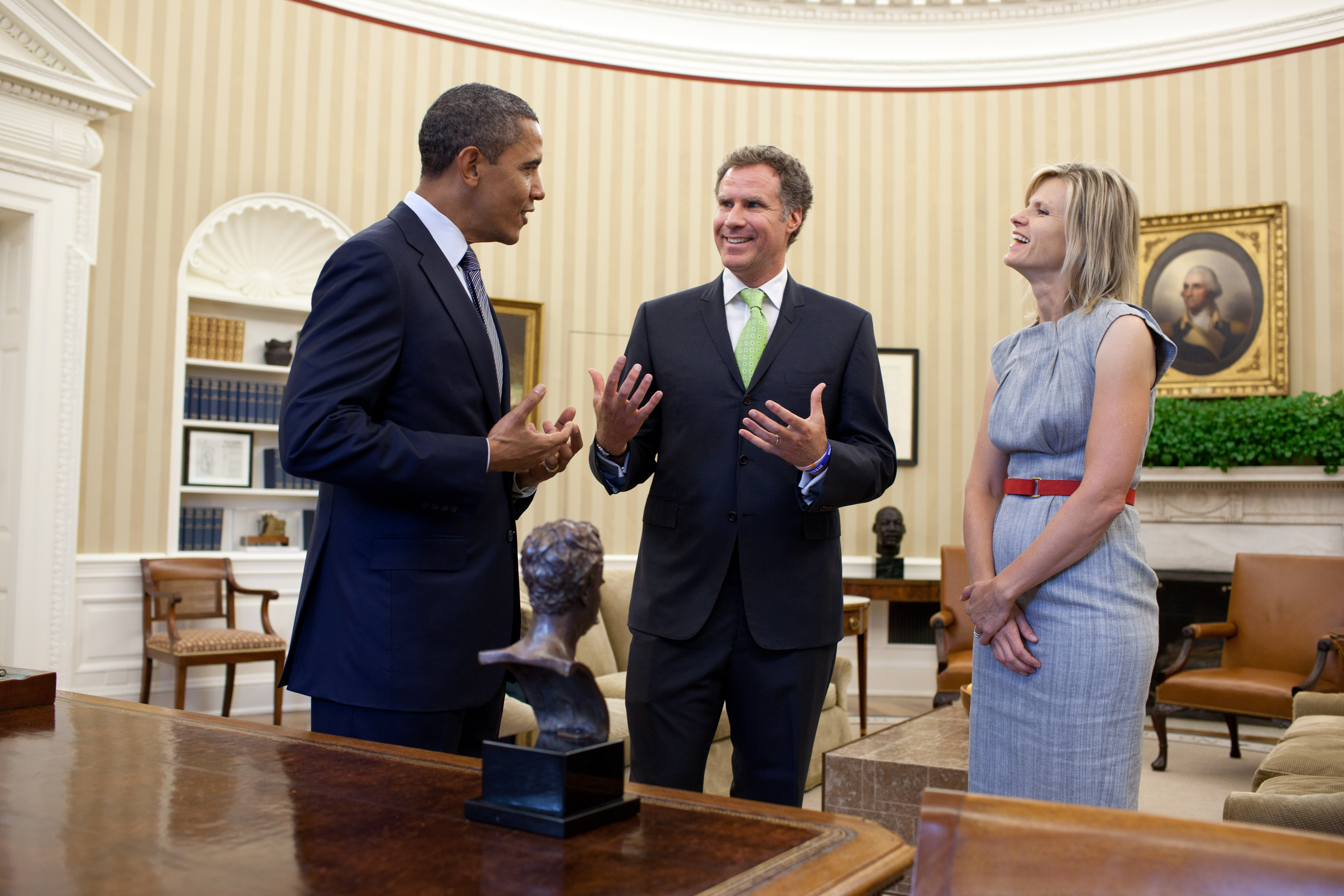
President Barack Obama with Will Ferrell and Viveca Paulin in 2011

The inaugural recipient of the award was Richard Pryor. The first two years of the prize honoring Pryor and Jonathan Winters were taped and broadcast on Comedy Central.

=== 2000–2024 ===
From 2000 to 2022, the award presentations were taped for broadcast on PBS. (McGarr 2021, pp. 173, Chapter 27) In 2023, the broadcaster for the award was CNN, and in 2024, a multi-year partnership with Netflix was announced. Carol Burnett received the award at age 80 in 2013, while the youngest recipient has been actress and comedian Tina Fey, at age 40 in 2010. The Kennedy Center's intent is to give the award to living persons, but one recipient, George Carlin, died in 2008 before receiving his award. Carlin died five days after the official press release that he would be awarded the prize. Bill Cosby accepted his award at the Kennedy Center in 2009. He had twice refused the award, stating that he was disappointed with the profanity used in the inaugural ceremony honoring Richard Pryor. After Cosby was convicted of sexual assault in 2018, the Center stripped Cosby of his award and his 1998 Kennedy Center Honors. Mel Brooks has refused the award three times. Robin Williams had also refused the award.

Since Carl Reiner, honorees are given the opportunity to meet the president, although some refuse. Twain had interactions with Ulysses S. Grant and Theodore Roosevelt.

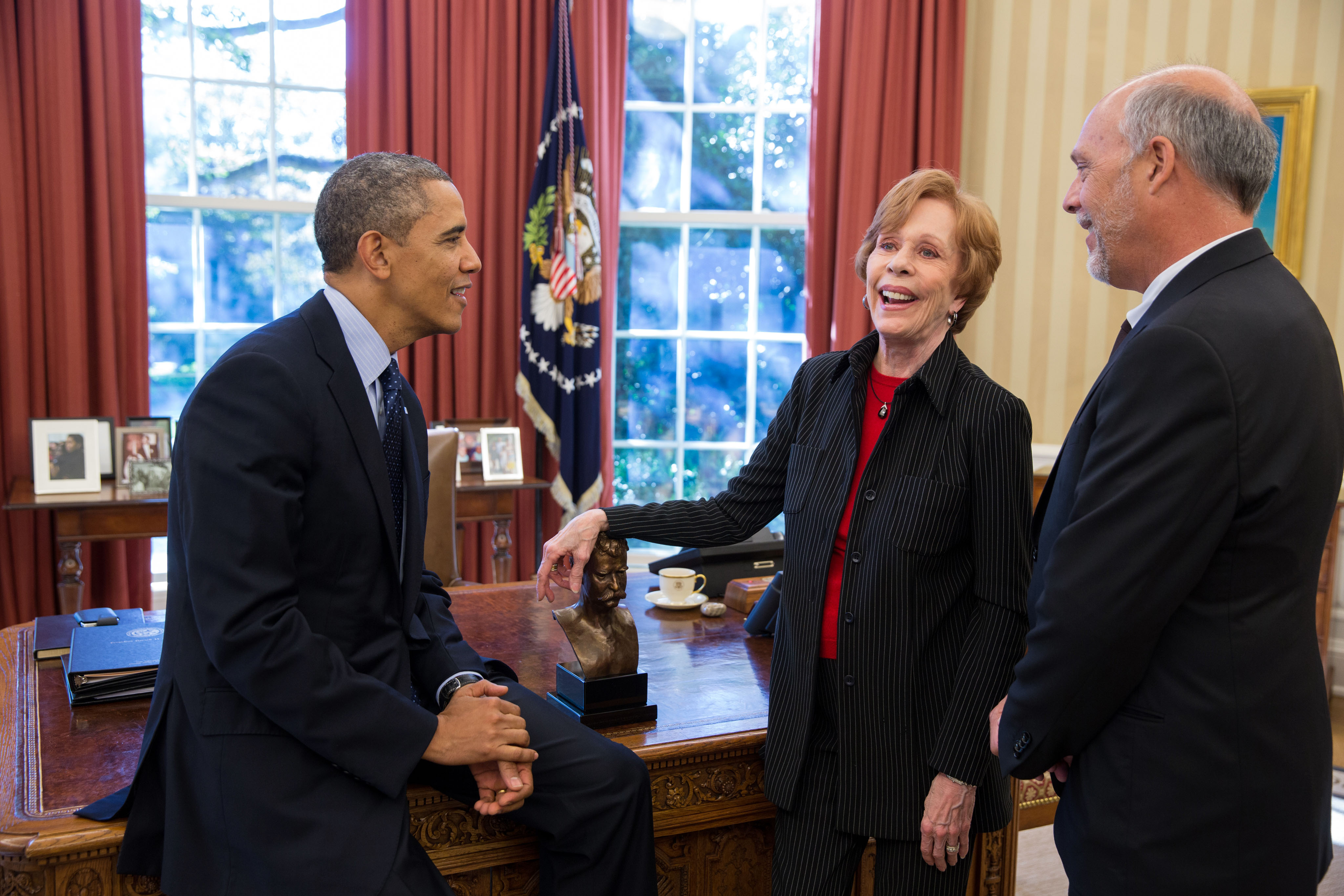
President Obama with awardee Carol Burnett in 2013

McGarr, a former Kennedy Center board member who is a co-founder and co-executive producer of the Twain Prize, writes in his book that the mission of the prize is "to honor the greatest contributors to American comedy of our time". Each awardee has a background in humor which has been a source of joy for many, showcased extensively on more than one occasion in more than one form, and as a part of the American comedic tradition having influenced industry and culture, is a legacy for American humorists to take inspiration from. Awardees have included a writer, an actor, a producer, a stand-up comedian and a media proprietor, among others. In awarding the prize to Lorne Michaels in 2004, a Canadian-American, McGarr explained that "the Mark Twain Prize honors American humor, not necessarily American humorists".

According to a 2013 article in The Washington Post, little is known about the selection process to receive the award. A Kennedy Center spokeswoman stated, "A short list is compiled by the executive producers [of the ceremony] and presented to a group comprised of representatives from the Kennedy Center board of trustees, as well as the Kennedy Center senior management and programming staff". But McGarr stated in 2013 that "there's really no committee... It's really a consensus decision. There's not any single person who decides." He also added the award's executive producers — McGarr, Mark Krantz and Peter and Bob Kaminsky — have always decided in consultation with the Kennedy Center's chairman and president, David Rubenstein and Michael Kaiser. He also stated that the primary criteria is "to choose people who've had a full lifetime of making us laugh and who've had a great influence on the people who've followed them."

=== 2025–present ===
The 26th Mark Twain Prize was awarded to Conan O'Brien at a ceremony held on March 23, 2025, in the Kennedy Center Concert Hall in Washington, D.C. The ceremony took place weeks after the Kennedy Center underwent a change in leadership following Donald Trump's appointment of new management in February 2025, a transition that briefly raised questions about whether the event would proceed as planned.

The special premiered on Netflix on May 4, 2025, as part of Netflix's exclusive arrangement as the award's broadcast home since 2024. It was produced by Done+Dusted — the Kennedy Center's producing partner for the Mark Twain Prize since 2018 — with executive producers David Jammy, Chris Convy, Kristen Wong, Rick Austin, Matthew Winer, and Monica Holt, and co-executive producers Bill Urban and Michael B. Matuza. The special subsequently won the Primetime Emmy Award for Outstanding Variety Special (Pre-Recorded) at the 77th Primetime Creative Arts Emmy Awards in September 2025.

== Recipients ==
Mark Twain Prize for American Humor awardees
Year	Image	Recipient	Notes
1998 (1st)	Richard Pryor in 1986	Richard Pryor	Those there to honor Pryor included Chris Rock, Robin Williams, Whoopi Goldberg, Chevy Chase, Tim Allen, Danny Glover, Damon Wayans, Kris Kristofferson, Richard Belzer, Morgan Freeman, Ruth Brown and Dick Gregory; Gene Wilder appeared in a pre-taped video.
1999 (2nd)	Jonathan Winters in 1963	Jonathan Winters	Those there to honor Winters included Steve Allen, Sid Caesar, Robin Williams, Bonnie Hunt, Robert Wuhl, Eugene Levy and Michael McKean.
2000 (3rd)	Carl Reiner in 1960	Carl Reiner	Those there to honor Reiner included Steve Martin, Mary Tyler Moore, Dick Van Dyke, Jerry Seinfeld, Rob Reiner, Joy Behar, Richard Belzer, and George Wallace; Mel Brooks and Ray Romano appeared in pre-taped videos.
2001 (4th)	Whoopi Goldberg in 2008	Whoopi Goldberg	Those there to honor Goldberg included Robin Williams, Billy Crystal, Wanda Sykes, Cedric the Entertainer, Chris Tucker, Alan King, Bruce Vilanch, Caroline Rhea, Tommy Davidson and Harry Belafonte.
2002 (5th)	Bob Newhart in 2002	Bob Newhart	Those there to honor Newhart included Kelsey Grammer, David Hyde Pierce, The Smothers Brothers, Don Rickles, Tim Conway, Bernie Mac, Jane Curtin, Fred Willard, Julia Sweeney and Steven Wright.
2003 (6th)	Lily Tomlin in 2014	Lily Tomlin	Those there to honor Tomlin included Jane Fonda, Robin Williams, Dave Chappelle, Elaine Stritch, Doris Roberts, George Lopez, Darrell Hammond, Catherine O'Hara, Miss Piggy and Dolly Parton; Whoopi Goldberg and Steve Martin appeared in pre-taped videos.
2004 (7th)	Lorne Michaels in 2008	Lorne Michaels	Michaels, a Canadian-American, is the only recipient as of 2025 born and raised outside of the United States. Those who honored Michaels included Steve Martin, Dan Aykroyd, Tina Fey, Maya Rudolph, Tim Meadows, David Spade, Paul Simon, Conan O'Brien, Christopher Walken, Senator John McCain, and Amy Poehler.
2005 (8th)	Steve Martin in 2011	Steve Martin	Those who honored Martin included Tom Hanks, Martin Short, Larry David, Dave Barry, Eric Idle, Diane Keaton, Claire Danes, Queen Latifah, Randy Newman, Paul Simon, Mike Nichols.
2006 (9th)	Neil Simon in 1974	Neil Simon	Those there to honor Simon included Nathan Lane, Matthew Broderick, Jason Alexander, Robert Klein, Paul Reiser, Christina Applegate, Richard Dreyfus, and Robert Redford.
2007 (10th)	Billy Crystal in 2018	Billy Crystal	Those who honored Crystal included Robin Williams, Whoopi Goldberg, Robert De Niro, Danny DeVito, Jimmy Fallon, Jon Lovitz, Martin Short, Rob Reiner, Bob Costas, Barbara Walters, and John Goodman.
2008 (11th)	George Carlin in 2008	George Carlin	The award is not intended to be given posthumously, but Carlin's death occurred between the announcement and the ceremony. Those there to honor Carlin included Joan Rivers, Jon Stewart, Bill Maher, Lewis Black, Denis Leary, Margaret Cho, Garry Shandling, and Lily Tomlin.
2009 (12th)	Bill Cosby in 2011	Bill Cosby	Those who honored Cosby included Jerry Seinfeld, Chris Rock, Sinbad, Malcolm-Jamal Warner, Steven Wright, Willie Nelson, Carl Reiner, Dick Gregory, Rita Moreno, and Phylicia Rashad. (Cosby's award was rescinded in 2018 due to a sexual assault conviction.)
2010 (13th)	Tina Fey in 2014	Tina Fey	Those who honored Fey included Alec Baldwin, Amy Poehler, Steve Martin, Steve Carell, Jimmy Fallon, Jon Hamm, Fred Armisen, Seth Meyers, Jennifer Hudson, Betty White, Jane Krakowski, and Lorne Michaels.
2011 (14th)	Will Ferrell in 2013	Will Ferrell	Those who honored Ferrell included Conan O'Brien, John C. Reilly, Ben Stiller, Jack Black, Paul Rudd, Adam McKay, Tim Meadows, Matthew Broderick, and Ed Asner.
2012 (15th)	Ellen DeGeneres in 2011	Ellen DeGeneres	Those there to honor DeGeneres included Jane Lynch, Sean Hayes, Jimmy Kimmel, John Leguizamo, John Krasinski, Steve Harvey, Kristin Chenoweth, and Lily Tomlin.
2013 (16th)	Carol Burnett in 2014	Carol Burnett	Those there to honor Burnett included Julie Andrews, Tina Fey, Amy Poehler, Maya Rudolph, Rashida Jones, Martin Short, Tony Bennett, Vicki Lawrence, and Tim Conway; Carl Reiner and Ellen DeGeneres appeared in pre-taped videos.
2014 (17th)	Jay Leno in 2008	Jay Leno	Those there to honor Leno included Jerry Seinfeld, Jimmy Fallon, Seth Meyers, Robert Klein, J.B. Smoove, Jamie Foxx, Wanda Sykes, Chelsea Handler, Kristin Chenoweth, and Garth Brooks.
2015 (18th)	Eddie Murphy in 2010	Eddie Murphy	Those there to honor Murphy included Dave Chappelle, Chris Rock, Arsenio Hall, Jay Pharoah, Tracy Morgan, Trevor Noah, George Lopez, Kevin Nealon, and Kathy Griffin.
2016 (19th)	Bill Murray in 2018	Bill Murray	Those who honored Murray included David Letterman, Emma Stone, Bill Hader, Aziz Ansari, Miley Cyrus, Jane Curtin, Jimmy Kimmel, Brian Doyle Murray, and Sigourney Weaver.
2017 (20th)	David Letterman in 2016	David Letterman	Those there to honor Letterman included Bill Murray, Steve Martin, Martin Short, John Mulaney, Norm Macdonald, Jimmy Kimmel, Jimmie Walker, and Eddie Vedder; Michelle Obama appeared in a pre-taped video. Al Franken appeared but was cut from the broadcast due to sexual harassment allegations against him.
2018 (21st)	Julia Louis-Dreyfus in 2017	Julia Louis-Dreyfus	Those there to honor Louis-Dreyfus included Jerry Seinfeld, Tina Fey, Stephen Colbert, Bryan Cranston, Tony Hale, Lisa Kudrow, Keegan-Michael Key, Kumail Nanjiani, Abbi Jacobson, Ilana Glazer, and Jack Johnson; Larry David appeared in a pre-taped video.
2019 (22nd)	Dave Chappelle in September 2018	Dave Chappelle	Those who honored Chappelle included Q-Tip, Jon Stewart, Bradley Cooper, Morgan Freeman, Aziz Ansari, Lorne Michaels, Mos Def, Talib Kweli, Erykah Badu, Sarah Silverman, Neal Brennan, Kenan Thompson, Michael Che, Colin Jost, Chris Tucker, Tiffany Haddish, Common, John Legend, and Chrissy Teigen. Eddie Murphy appeared in a pre-taped video. The PBS broadcast of the ceremony was unique, because footage of the ceremony was interspersed with footage of Chappelle performing standup in a comedy club.
2022 (23rd)	Jon Stewart in 2016	Jon Stewart	Those who honored Stewart included Samantha Bee, Steve Carell, Dave Chappelle, Pete Davidson, Ed Helms, Jimmy Kimmel, Jon Meacham, Olivia Munn, Bassem Youssef, and Bruce Springsteen. Stephen Colbert appeared remotely via video chat, and John Oliver appeared in a pre-taped video that satirized a eulogy.
2023 (24th)	Adam Sandler in 2017	Adam Sandler	Those who honored Sandler included Dana Carvey, Luis Guzmán, Tim Herlihy, Idina Menzel, Rob Schneider, Ben Stiller, Jennifer Aniston, Judd Apatow, Drew Barrymore, Steve Buscemi, Conan O'Brien, Chris Rock, Pete Davidson, and David Spade.
2024 (25th)	Kevin Hart	Kevin Hart	Those who honored Hart include Jerry Seinfeld, Dave Chappelle, Chris Rock, Jimmy Fallon, J.B. Smoove, Tiffany Haddish, Regina Hall, Chelsea Handler, Nick Cannon and Keith Robinson.
2025 (26th)	Conan O'Brian	Conan O'Brien	Those who honored O'Brien include David Letterman, Will Ferrell, Adam Sandler, John Mulaney, Sarah Silverman, Andy Richter, Stephen Colbert, Bill Burr, Nikki Glaser, Sean Evans, Tracy Morgan, Kumail Nanjiani, and Reggie Watts. Martin Short, Bill Hader, Paul Rudd and Fred Armisen all appeared in pre-taped videos. The Interrupter, Triumph the Insult Comic Dog, the FedEx Pope, the Masturbating Bear, and Jordan Schlansky all briefly appear to hand off the Prize to Letterman who presents it to O'Brien. Will Forte portrayed Mark Twain.
2026 (27th)	Bill Maher	Bill Maher	Those who honored Maher included Louis C.K., Whitney Cummings, Woody Harrelson, Arianna Huffington, Jay Leno, Stephen A. Smith and Matt Friend. Jerry Seinfeld appeared in a pre-taped bit and John Mellencamp performed the song, "Authority Song".

== See also ==
- Kennedy Center Honors, during which the following comedians, comic actors, and humorists have been honored: Bob Hope, Lucille Ball, George Burns, Johnny Carson, Neil Simon, Bill Cosby (rescinded in 2018), Carol Burnett, Steve Martin, Mel Brooks, David Letterman, Lily Tomlin, and Billy Crystal.
