= Fred Astaire and Ginger Rogers =

Hollywood double act

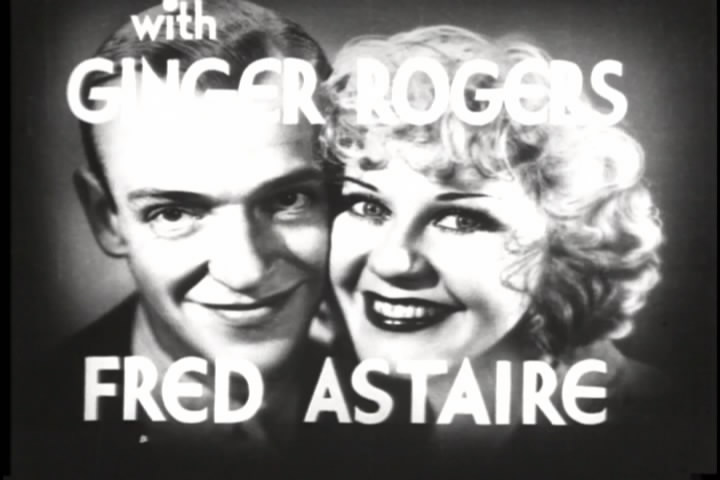
Fred Astaire and Ginger Rogers's first movie together was Flying Down to Rio (1933).

Fred Astaire (May 10, 1899 – June 22, 1987) and Ginger Rogers (July 16, 1911 – April 25, 1995) were dance partners in a total of 10 films, 9 being released by RKO Pictures from 1933 to 1939, and 1, The Barkleys of Broadway, by Metro-Goldwyn-Mayer in 1949, their only Technicolor film.

== Career at RKO ==
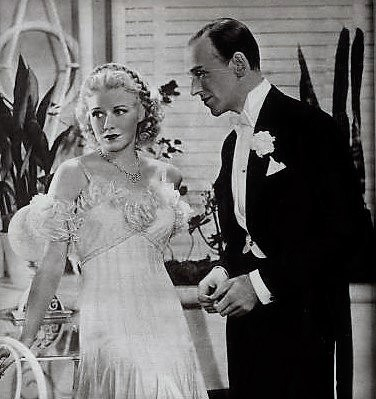
Astaire and Rogers in The Gay Divorcee (1934), their second film together and their first pairing in leading roles

Astaire and Rogers were first paired together in the 1933 movie Flying Down to Rio. They were cast in supporting roles, with fifth and fourth billing, respectively, but their performance in the "Carioca" number was the highlight of the film, and RKO Radio Pictures was eager to capitalize on their popularity.

In 1934, Astaire and Rogers made the musical movie The Gay Divorcee, which co-starred Edward Everett Horton. It was their first joint starring roles in a movie and grossed even more than Flying Down to Rio, with worldwide rentals of $1.8 million; the movie also featured the classic Cole Porter song "Night and Day". The song "The Continental" from the movie was a hit and was also the first song to win the Academy Award for Best Original Song at the 1934 Academy Awards.

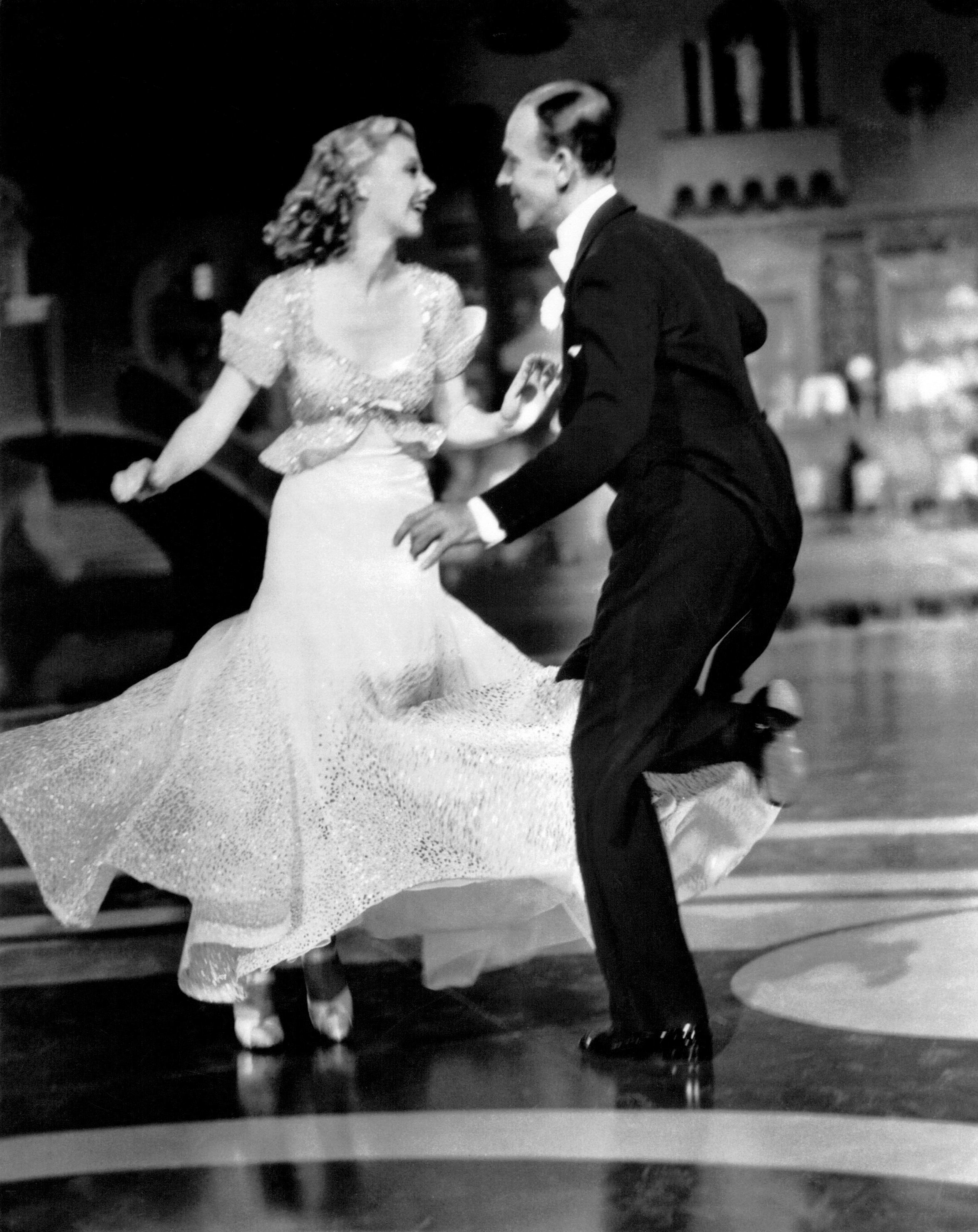
Rogers and Astaire dance to "The Piccolino" in Top Hat (1935)

Astaire and Rogers made two movies in 1935. In Roberta, which featured the song "I Won't Dance", Astaire and Rogers received second and third billing, respectively, behind Irene Dunne. It was a hit, with worldwide rentals of $2.3 million. Top Hat, which also co-starred Horton, marked the first time the duo had a film written solely for them, and it proved to be one of the most successful films of the year, with worldwide rentals of $3.2 million. It was the most profitable film RKO made in the 1930s, with profits of $1.3 million. The film featured songs by Irving Berlin, including the Oscar-nominated "Cheek to Cheek".

They were voted fourth on the Top Ten Money Making Stars Poll for 1934–1935, as published by Quigley Publishing Company.

By 1936, Astaire and Rogers were top box office names. That year they made another two movies together: Follow the Fleet and Swing Time, which were both hits, earning worldwide rentals of $2.7 million and $2.6 million, respectively. Follow the Fleet boasted another Irving Berlin score, which featured the vignette "Let's Face the Music and Dance". Swing Time spawned the Oscar-winning song "The Way You Look Tonight", written by Jerome Kern with lyrics by Dorothy Fields, which Astaire sang to Rogers. John Mueller has cited Swing Time for possessing "the greatest dancing in the history of the universe." The dance sequences for Swing Time (e.g. "Never Gonna Dance") are considered by Arlene Croce to be the high point of their art. This scene took 47 takes to perfect, during which the dancers had to ascend stairs, spinning, until they perfected it. By the end of the shoot, Rogers' feet were bleeding. They were voted the third biggest money making stars of 1936 in the annual Quigley poll.

Astaire and Rogers made one movie in 1937, Shall We Dance, once again co-starring Edward Everett Horton. Although the film was RKO's biggest film of the year, with worldwide rentals of $2.2 million, it did not perform as well as the studio had expected. Shall We Dance had the first Hollywood score by the brothers George and Ira Gershwin, and included the song "They Can't Take That Away from Me". Although Astaire and Rogers would go on to make two more films together for RKO, the film's relative disappointment at the box office was the beginning of the end of their partnership.

After an unusually long period apart, Astaire and Rogers made only one movie together in 1938, the 80-minute Carefree. During their time apart, Rogers appeared in the successful movie Stage Door, while Astaire appeared alongside Joan Fontaine in the musical A Damsel in Distress, the first film he had made to lose money. Carefree marked a departure from their on-screen formula, featuring Astaire in a role unlike his usual typecast persona, as well as less emphasis on the musical elements. Carefree was originally supposed to include sequences shot in Technicolor, but RKO considered the cost prohibitive, so it was filmed in black and white. This movie features an Irving Berlin musical score with only four songs, the fewest in any Astaire and Rogers film. While the film was well received by critics, with Motion Picture Herald's William R. Weaver calling it "the greatest Astaire-Rogers picture", it was their most expensive film to date, costing $1.3 million and ultimately losing money for the studio, despite worldwide rentals of $1.7 million.

In 1939, Astaire and Rogers made The Story of Vernon and Irene Castle. It was the end of their partnership for ten years. Despite several successful films, RKO was facing bankruptcy. Due to the high cost and low profit of the most recent Astaire-Rogers vehicles, along with the stars' mutual desire to branch out, RKO announced the end of the on-screen partnership. Although their relationship remained amicable, both wanted to explore new avenues. Rogers was interested in more dramatic roles than those she was offered with Astaire. Meanwhile, Astaire, who worked with many dancers throughout his career, wished to be known as a dancer in his own right, rather than always being paired with one permanent partner.

== Hiatus ==
Rogers had long been keen to pursue more dramatic roles, which she successfully managed after the end of her collaboration with Astaire. At the 1941 Academy Awards ceremony, Rogers won the Academy Award for Best Actress for her performance in Kitty Foyle and by the mid-1940s she was one of the highest-paid actress in Hollywood, although her career waned post-war.

Astaire continued to make musicals, including Holiday Inn (1942) with Bing Crosby, Sky's The Limit (1943) with Joan Leslie and Blue Skies (1946), his second and last movie with Crosby. He also partnered with numerous other dancers, including Rita Hayworth, Cyd Charisse and Judy Garland. Fearing his career was fading, Blue Skies was due to be Astaire's last film, after which he retired for two years. In 1948, Gene Kelly was due to star in Metro-Goldwyn-Mayer's Easter Parade with Judy Garland, but broke his ankle, and at Kelly's request, MGM convinced Astaire to fill in, ending his retirement.

== Reunion and later life ==
Due to their success as a partnership, Garland and Astaire were due to reunite for The Barkleys of Broadway, but Garland was forced to drop out due to illness and Rogers took her place. The film, released in 1949, was their only movie for MGM and their only Technicolor film. This film was greeted with joy by critics, who were thrilled to see the partnership together once again. The Barkleys of Broadway would be Astaire and Rogers' final movie together, although both would continue to make films with other stars.

In 1950, Rogers presented an honorary Academy Award to Astaire "for his unique artistry and his contributions to the technique of musical pictures."

Throughout the 1950s, Rogers' film career declined, and she began to focus more on Broadway roles; she received great acclaim for her portrayals of the title characters in Mame and Hello, Dolly!. On several occasions, she did express interest in making another film with Astaire, although this never came to fruition. Astaire remained in the film industry and also branched out into television. Despite going in different directions career-wise, the duo remained friends for the rest of their lives. At a 1979 event honoring Rogers, Astaire said, "She’s been such a wonderful partner. There are all kinds of rumors that we used to fight. And we didn’t. I’ve been denying it for the last twenty years or more." In an interview the following year, Rogers shared this sentiment; “Studio publicity men were always trying to make it look like we fought, just to keep our names in the papers.”

After Astaire died in 1987, Rogers said in an interview, “I just adored and admired Fred with all my heart... He was the best partner anyone could ever have.”

== Filmography ==
Year	Title	Co-stars	Musical numbers	Awards and nominations
1933	Flying Down to Rio	Dolores Del Rio; Gene Raymond; Raul Roulien	"Music Makes Me"; "The Carioca"; "Orchids in the Moonlight"; "Flying Down To Rio"	7th Academy Awards: Best Song - Vincent Youmans, Edward Eliscu and Gus Kahn ("The Carioca")
1934	The Gay Divorcee	Edward Everett Horton; Alice Brady; Erik Rhodes; Eric Blore	"Don't Let It Bother You"; "It's Just Like Looking for a Needle in a Haystack"; "Let's K-nock K-nees"; "Night and Day"; "The Continental"	7th Academy Awards: Outstanding Production - Pandro S. Berman; Best Scoring - RKO Radio Studio Music Department; Best Song - Con Conrad and Herb Magidson ("The Continental"); Best Sound Recording - Carl Dreher; Best Art Direction - Van Nest Polglase and Carroll Clark
1935	Roberta	Irene Dunne; Randolph Scott; Helen Westley	"Let's Begin"; "Yesterdays"; "I'll Be Hard to Handle"; "I Won't Dance"; "Smoke Gets In Your Eyes"; "Russian Lullaby"; "Lovely to Look At"	8th Academy Awards: Best Song - Jerome Kern, Dorothy Fields and Jimmy McHugh ("Lovely To Look At")
1935	Top Hat	Edward Everett Horton; Helen Broderick; Erik Rhodes; Eric Blore	"No Strings"; "Isn't This A Lovely Day To Be Caught In The Rain"; "Top Hat, White Tie and Tails"; "Cheek to Cheek"; "The Piccolino"	8th Academy Awards: Outstanding Production - Pandro S. Berman; Best Song - Irving Berlin ("Cheek to Cheek"); Best Art Direction - Van Nest Polglase and Carroll Clark; Best Dance Direction - Hermes Pan
1936	Follow the Fleet	Randolph Scott; Harriet Hilliard; Astrid Allwyn	"We Saw the Sea"; "Let Yourself Go"; "Get Thee Behind Me Satan"; "I'd Rather Lead A Band"; "But Where Are You?"; "I'm Putting All My Eggs in One Basket"; "Let's Face the Music and Dance"	
1936	Swing Time	Victor Moore; Helen Broderick; Eric Blore; Georges Metaxa	"Pick Yourself Up"; "The Way You Look Tonight"; "Waltz in Swing Time"; "A Fine Romance"; "Bojangles of Harlem"; "Never Gonna Dance"	9th Academy Awards: Best Song - Jerome Kern and Dorothy Fields ("The Way You Look Tonight"); Best Dance Direction - Hermes Pan
1937	Shall We Dance	Edward Everett Horton; Eric Blore; Jerome Cowan; Ketti Gallian	"Slap That Bass"; "Walking the Dog" / "(I've Got) Beginner's Luck"; "They All Laughed"; "Let's Call the Whole Thing Off"; "They Can't Take That Away From Me"; "Shall We Dance"	10th Academy Awards: Best Song - George Gershwin and Ira Gershwin ("They Can't Take That Away From Me")
1938	Carefree	Ralph Bellamy; Luella Gear; Jack Carson; Clarence Kolb	"Since They Turned Loch Lomond Into Swing"; "I Used to Be Color Blind"; "The Yam"; "Change Partners"	11th Academy Awards: Best Scoring - Victor Baravalle; Best Song - Irving Berlin ("Change Partners"); Best Art Direction - Van Nest Polglase
1939	The Story of Vernon and Irene Castle	Edna May Oliver; Walter Brennan; Lew Fields	"Hello! Hello! Who's Your Lady Friend?"; "By The Light of the Silvery Moon"; "Waiting for the Robert E. Lee"; "Too Much Mustard"; "Medley Montage"; "The Last Waltz"	
1949	The Barkleys of Broadway	Oscar Levant; Billie Burke; Gale Robbins; Jacques François	"Swing Trot"; "Sabre Dance"; "You'd Be Hard To Replace"; "Bouncin' the Blues"; "My One and Only Highland Fling"; "Weekend in the Country"; "Shoes With Wings On"; "They Can't Take That Away From Me"; "Manhattan Down Beat"	22nd Academy Awards: Best Cinematography, Color - Harry Stradling
1949	The Barkleys of Broadway	Oscar Levant; Billie Burke; Gale Robbins; Jacques François	"Swing Trot"; "Sabre Dance"; "You'd Be Hard To Replace"; "Bouncin' the Blues"; "My One and Only Highland Fling"; "Weekend in the Country"; "Shoes With Wings On"; "They Can't Take That Away From Me"; "Manhattan Down Beat"	2nd Writers Guild of America Awards: Best Written Musical - Betty Comden and Adolph Green
