= Ginger Rogers filmography =

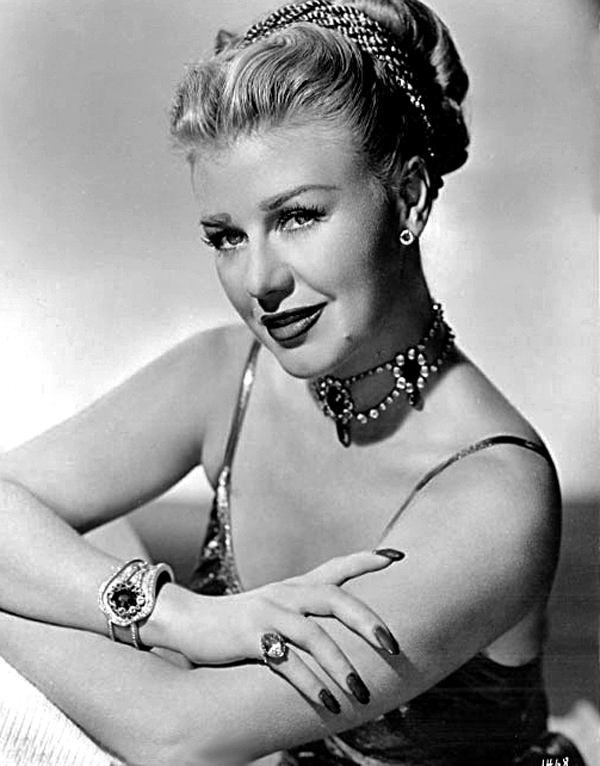
Ginger Rogers - 1940s

The Ginger Rogers filmography lists the film appearances of American actress Ginger Rogers, as well as her television, stage, and radio credits. Rogers's career spanned fifty-seven years, from 1930 to 1987.

Initially signing with Paramount Pictures in 1930, she quickly opted out of her contract and worked for several studios, most notably for Warner Brothers in musicals 42nd Street (1933) and Gold Diggers of 1933 (1933), during this time she was named one of WAMPAS Baby Stars. In 1932 Ginger co-starred with comedian Joe E. Brown in the movie You Said a Mouthful. In 1933, Rogers signed with RKO Radio Pictures, where she was paired with dancer Fred Astaire in commercially successful Flying Down to Rio (1933). The pair achieved greater success in subsequent musicals The Gay Divorcee (1934), Top Hat (1935), Swing Time (1936), and Shall We Dance (1937), totaling 9 films made between 1933 and 1939.

Without Astaire, Rogers starred in critically and commercially successful non-musicals throughout the remainder of the 1930s such as Stage Door (1937) with Katharine Hepburn, Vivacious Lady (1938) with James Stewart, and Bachelor Mother (1939) with David Niven, culminating with an Academy Award for Best Actress for her performance in Kitty Foyle (1940).

Rogers flourished throughout the 1940s, becoming one of the most popular and highest paid actresses of the decade. She starred in comedies Tom, Dick and Harry (1941) and Roxie Hart (1942; this was an adaptation of the 1926 non-musical play Chicago, and later the inspiration for the hit 1975 musical and 2002 film adaptation), dramas Tender Comrade (1943) and I'll Be Seeing You (1944) and in director Billy Wilder's American film debut The Major and the Minor (1942).

She was reunited with Fred Astaire for MGM's The Barkleys of Broadway (1949).

In the 1950s, Rogers' film career had faltered, due to lesser demand for older actresses. She co-starred with popular Cary Grant in Monkey Business (1952) but her career continued to wane throughout the decade. She ended her film career with one of two fictionalized biographies on actress Jean Harlow in 1965's Harlow. Beginning the following year, she found success by returning to musical theatre, including a stint as one of several replacements for Carol Channing in the long-running Hello, Dolly! on Broadway.

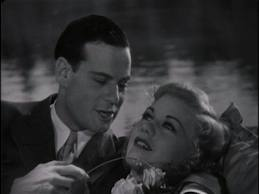
With Norman Foster in
Rafter Romance (1933)

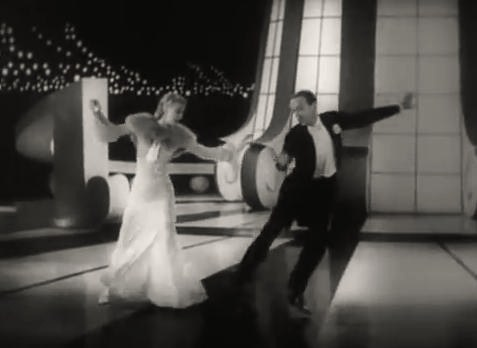
With Fred Astaire in
Follow the Fleet (1936)

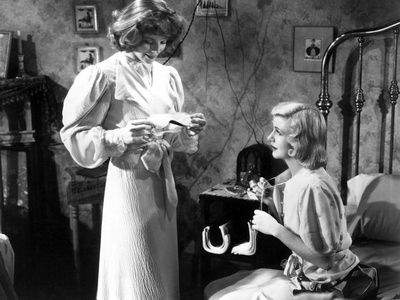
With Katharine Hepburn in
Stage Door (1937)

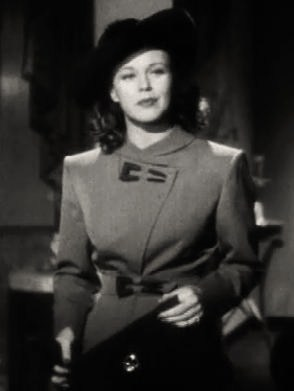
Kitty Foyle (1940), an Academy Award winner for Best Actress

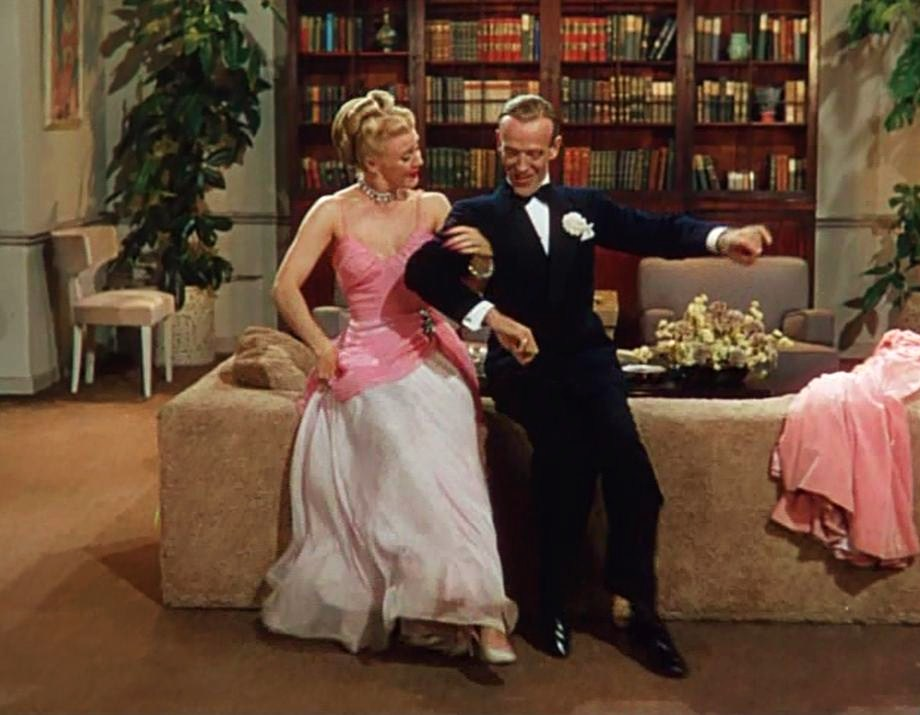
With Fred Astaire in
The Barkleys of Broadway (1949)

== Acting credits ==
=== Films ===
Year	Title	Role(s)	Director	Notes	Ref.
1930	Night in a Dormitory		Harry Delmar	maybe 1929	
1930	Young Man of Manhattan	Puff Randolph	Monta Bell		
1930	Queen High	Polly Rockwell	Fred C. Newmeyer		
1930	The Sap from Syracuse	Ellen Saunders	A. Edward Sutherland		
1930	Follow the Leader	Mary Brennan	Norman Taurog		
1931	Honor Among Lovers	Doris Brown	Dorothy Arzner		
1931	The Tip-Off	Babyface	Albert S. Rogell		
1931	Suicide Fleet	Sally	Albert S. Rogell		
1932	Carnival Boat	Honey	Albert S. Rogell		
1932	The Tenderfoot	Ruth Weston	Ray Enright		
1932	The Thirteenth Guest	Lela/Marie	Albert Ray		
1932	Hat Check Girl	Jessie King	Sidney Lanfield		
1932	You Said a Mouthful	Alice Brandon	Lloyd Bacon		
1933	42nd Street	Ann Lowell / Anytime Annie	Lloyd Bacon		
1933	Broadway Bad	Flip Daly	Sidney Lanfield		
1933	Gold Diggers of 1933	Fay Fortune	Mervyn LeRoy		
1933	Professional Sweetheart	Glory Eden	William A. Seiter		
1933	A Shriek in the Night	Pat Morgan	Albert Ray		
1933	Don't Bet on Love	Molly Gilbert	Murray Roth		
1933	Sitting Pretty	Dorothy	Harry Joe Brown		
1933	Flying Down to Rio	Honey Hales	Thornton Freeland	The first Astaire–Rogers pairing	
1933	Chance at Heaven	Marjorie "Marje" Harris	William A. Seiter		
1933	Rafter Romance	Mary Carroll	William A. Seiter		
1934	Finishing School	Cecilia "Pony" Ferris	Wanda Tuchock and George Nicholas		
1934	Twenty Million Sweethearts	Peggy Cornell	Ray Enright		
1934	Change of Heart	Madge Rountree	John G. Blystone		
1934	Upperworld	Lilly	Roy Del Ruth		
1934	The Gay Divorcee	Mimi Glossop	Mark Sandrich		
1935	Romance in Manhattan	Sylvia Dennis	Stephen Roberts		
1935	Roberta	Scharwenka	William A. Seiter		
1935	Star of Midnight	Donna Mantin	Stephen Roberts		
1935	Top Hat	Dale Tremont	Mark Sandrich		
1935	In Person	Carol Corliss/Clara Colfax	William A. Seiter		
1936	Follow the Fleet	Sherry Martin	Mark Sandrich		
1936	Swing Time	Penelope "Penny" Carroll	George Stevens	Fred Astaire	
1937	Shall We Dance	Linda Keene	Mark Sandrich		
1937	Stage Door	Jean Maitland	Gregory La Cava		
1938	Having Wonderful Time	Thelma "Teddy" Shaw	Alfred Santell		
1938	Vivacious Lady	Francey Morgan	George Stevens		
1938	Carefree	Amanda Cooper	Mark Sandrich		
1939	The Story of Vernon and Irene Castle	Irene Castle	H.C. Pounder		
1939	Bachelor Mother	Polly Parrish	Garson Kanin		
1939	Fifth Avenue Girl	Mary Grey	Gregory La Cava		
1940	Primrose Path	Ellie May Adams	Gregory La Cava		
1940	Lucky Partners	Jean Newton	Lewis Milestone		
1940	Kitty Foyle	Kitty Foyle	Sam Wood		
1941	Tom, Dick and Harry	Janie	Garson Kanin		
1942	Roxie Hart	Roxie Hart	William A. Wellman		
1942	Tales of Manhattan	Diane	Julien Duvivier		
1942	The Major and the Minor	Susan Kathleen Applegate	Billy Wilder		
1942	Once Upon a Honeymoon	Katie / Katherine / Baroness Von Luber	Leo McCarey		
1943	Tender Comrade	Jo Jones	Edward Dmytryk		
1944	Lady in the Dark	Liza Elliott	Mitchell Leisen		
1944	I'll Be Seeing You	Mary Marshall	William Dieterle		
1945	Week-End at the Waldorf	Irene Malvern	Robert Z. Leonard	Remake of the 1932 film Grand Hotel	
1946	Heartbeat	Arlette Lafron	Sam Wood		
1946	Magnificent Doll	Dolley Madison	Frank Borzage		
1947	It Had to Be You	Victoria Stafford	Don Hartman and Rudolph Mate		
1949	The Barkleys of Broadway	Dinah Barkley	Charles Walters	Rogers replaced Judy Garland	
1950	Perfect Strangers	Theresa "Terry" Scott	Bretaigne Windust		
1951	Storm Warning	Marsha Mitchell	Stuart Heisler		
1951	The Groom Wore Spurs	A. J. Furnival	Richard Whorf		
1952	We're Not Married!	Ramona Gladwyn	Edmund Goulding		
1952	Monkey Business	Edwina Fulton	Howard Hawks		
1952	Dreamboat	Gloria Marlowe	Claude Binyon		
1953	Forever Female	Beatrice Page	Irving Rapper		
1954	Black Widow	Carlotta "Lottie" Marin	Nunnally Johnson		
1954	Twist of Fate	Joan Victor	David Miller	Aka in the UK as Beautiful Stranger	
1955	Tight Spot	Sherry Conley	Phil Karlson		
1956	The First Traveling Saleslady	Rose Gillray	Arthur Lubin		
1956	Teenage Rebel	Nancy Fallon	Edmund Goulding		
1957	Oh, Men! Oh, Women!	Mildred Turner	Nunnally Johnson		
1964	Quick, Let's Get Married	Madame Rinaldi	William Dieterle	Also known as "The Confession"	
1965	Harlow	Mama Jean Bello	Alex Segal	Rogers' final film.	

Box office ranking

- 1935 - 14th
- 1936 - 19th
- 1938 - 18th
- 1939 - 21st
- 1940 - 23rd
- 1941 - 18th
- 1944 - 16th
- 1945 - 23rd

=== Short films ===
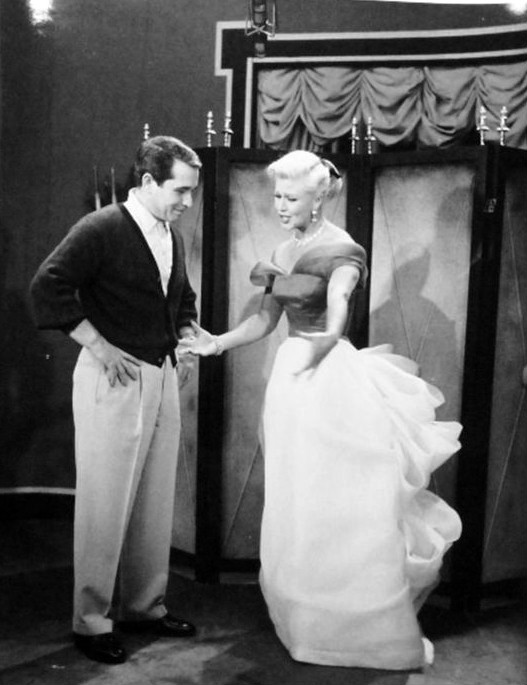
An appearance with Perry Como on TV's Kraft Music Hall (1957)

- A Day of a Man of Affairs (1929)
- A Night in a Dormitory (1930)
- Campus Sweethearts (1930)
- Office Blues (1930)
- Hollywood on Parade (1932)
- Screen Snapshots (1932)
- Hollywood on Parade No. A-9 (1933)
- Hollywood Newsreel (1934)
- Screen Snapshots Series 16, No. 3 (1936)
- Show Business at War (1943)
- Battle Stations (Narrator, 1944)
- Screen Snapshots: The Great Showman (1950)
- Screen Snapshots: Hollywood's Great Entertainers (1954)

=== Television ===
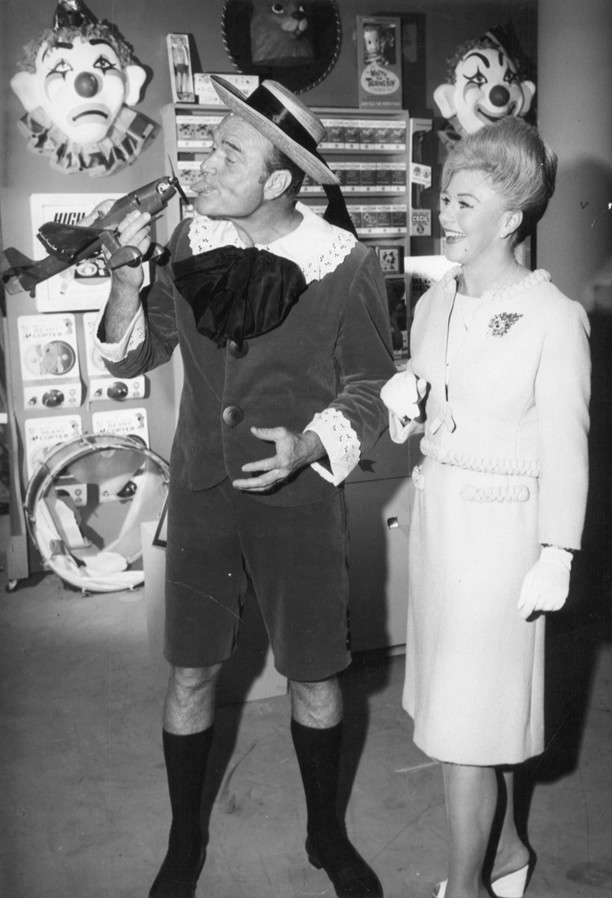
On The Red Skelton Show (1963)

Year	Title	Role(s)	Notes	Ref.
1956–1965	Perry Como's Kraft Music Hall	Herself / Guest	10 episodes	
1959	The DuPont Show with June Allyson	Kay Neilson	Episode: "The Tender Shoot"	
1954–1966	What's My Line?	Herself	6 episodes	
1964	The Hollywood Palace	Herself	2 episodes	
1963–1964	The Red Skelton Show	Performer	3 episodes	
1957	The Jack Benny Program	Herself	Episode: "Ginger Rogers Show"	
1959	The Pat Boone Chevy Showroom	Herself	Episode 2.6	
1963	The Ed Sullivan Show (1963)	Herself	Sang: "Something's Gotta Give"	
1965	Chrysler Theatre	Helen	Episode: "Terror Island"	
1965	Rodgers & Hammerstein's Cinderella	The Queen	Television special	
1971	Here's Lucy	Herself	Episode: "Ginger Rogers Comes to Tea"	
1979	The Love Boat	Stella	2 episodes	
1984	Glitter	Margaret	Episode: "In Tennis, Love Means Nothing"	
1987	Hotel	Natalie Trent	Episode: "Hail and Farewell"	

=== Theater ===
- Top Speed (1929)
- Girl Crazy (1930)
- Love and Let Love (1951)
- The Pink Jungle (1959)
- Annie Get Your Gun (1960)
- Bell, Book and Candle (1960)
- Calamity Jane (1961)
- Husband and Wife (1962)
- The Unsinkable Molly Brown (1963)
- A More Perfect Union (1963)
- Tovarich (1964)
- Hello, Dolly! (1965, Broadway,
  replacement for lead)
- Mame (London, 1969)
- Coco (1971)
- No, No, Nanette (1974)
- Forty Carats (1974)
- Anything Goes (1980)
- Miss Moffat (1983)
- Charley's Aunt (1984)

=== Radio appearances ===
Selected Works

Year	Program	Notes
1936-1953	Lux Radio Theatre	11 Episodes
1943-1947	Command Performance	5 Episodes
1950-1951	Cavalcade of America	2 Episodes
1951	Suspense	Episode: "Vamp Till Dead"
