= Satellite Award for Best Classic DVD =

Retired annual media award

The Satellite Award for Best Classic DVD was an award given by the International Press Academy from 2004 to 2010 and in 2012.

== Winners and nominees ==
Year	Winners and nominees	
2004	Looney Tunes	The Golden Collection
2004	The Ace of Hearts, The Unknown, Laugh, Clown, Laugh, and Lon Chaney: A Thousand Faces	For "The Lon Chaney Collection".
2004	From Russia with Love, You Only Live Twice, Diamonds Are Forever, Moonraker, For Your Eyes Only, The Living Daylights, The World Is Not Enough, Thunderball, On Her Majesty's Secret Service, Live and Let Die, Octopussy, A View to a Kill, and Die Another Day	For "The James Bond DVD Collection", volumes 2 & 3.
2004	Modern Times, The Gold Rush, The Great Dictator, Limelight	For "The Charlie Chaplin Collection" (Warner).
2004	Raiders of the Lost Ark, Indiana Jones and the Temple of Doom, and Indiana Jones and the Last Crusade	For "The Adventures of Indiana Jones" set.
2004	Scarface	
2005 (January)	La Dolce Vita	
2005 (January)	Zorba the Greek	
2005 (January)	The China Syndrome	
2005 (January)	Easy Rider	
2005 (January)	Fanny and Alexander	
2005 (January)	Murder on the Orient Express	
2005 (January)	Ragtime	
2005 (January)	Persuasion, Little Women, and Sense and Sensibility	For the Classic Masterpiece Book & DVD set.
2005 (January)	The Snake Pit	
2005 (January)	Star Wars: Episode IV – A New Hope, Star Wars: Episode V – The Empire Strikes Back, and Star Wars: Episode VI – Return of the Jedi	For the Star Wars Trilogy.
2005 (January)	Time Bandits	For the Divimax Special Edition.
2005	The Wizard of Oz	Three Disc Collector's Edition.
2005	Airplane!	"Don't Call Me Shirley" Edition.
2005	Cat People, The Curse of the Cat People, I Walked with a Zombie, The Body Snatcher, Isle of the Dead, Bedlam, The Leopard Man, The Ghost Ship, The Seventh Victim, and Shadows in the Dark: The Val Lewton Legacy	
2005	The Devil's Rejects	Unrated Widescreen Edition.
2005	Gladiator	Extended Edition.
2005	King Kong, The Son of Kong, and Mighty Joe Young	For the King Kong Collection (2-Disc Special Edition).
2005	The Man with the Golden Arm	50th Anniversary Edition.
2005	Pickpocket	
2005	Saboteur, Shadow of a Doubt, Rope, Rear Window, The Trouble with Harry, The Man Who Knew Too Much, Vertigo, Psycho, The Birds, Marnie, Torn Curtain, Topaz, Frenzy, and Family Plot	For Alfred Hitchcock - The Masterpiece Collection.
2005	Seven Men from Now	Special Collector's Edition.
2005	The Sound of Music	40th Anniversary Edition.
2005	Titanic	Special Collector's Edition.
2005	Top Hat, Swing Time, Follow the Fleet, Shall We Dance, and The Barkleys of Broadway	For the Astaire and Rogers Collection, Vol. 1.
2006	The Conformist	
2006	State Fair, Oklahoma!, Carousel, The King and I, South Pacific, and The Sound of Music	For the "Rodgers & Hammerstein Box Set Collection".
2006	The Wild Bunch, Pat Garrett and Billy the Kid, Ride the High Country, and The Ballad of Cable Hogue	For "Sam Peckinpah's Legendary Westerns Collection".
2006	Flying Down to Rio, The Gay Divorcee, Roberta, Top Hat, Follow the Fleet, Swing Time, Shall We Dance, Carefree, The Story of Vernon and Irene Castle, and The Barkleys of Broadway	For the "Astaire & Rogers Ultimate Collector's Edition".
2006	Breakfast at Tiffany's	For the "Anniversary Edition".
2006	Cabin in the Sky	
2006	Grease	
2006	1900	
2006	Valley of the Dolls	
2006	The Wicker Man	
2007	The Graduate	For the 40th anniversary edition.
2007	Ace in the Hole	
2007	Cruising	
2007	The Full Monty	For the fully exposed edition.
2007	Funny Face	For the 50th anniversary edition.
2007	Ghost	For episode the special collector's edition.
2007	House of Games	
2007	The Pirate	
2007	RoboCop	For the collector's edition.
2007	Stranger Than Paradise	
2008	The Godfather, The Godfather Part II, and The Godfather Part III	The Godfather Collection - The Coppola Restoration
2008	High Noon	Two-Disc Ultimate Collector's Edition
2008	Young Frankenstein	
2008	The Mummy	
2008	Road House	
2008	Psycho	
2008	Beetlejuice	20th Anniversary Deluxe Edition
2008	Diva	
2008	Dracula	75th Anniversary Edition
2008	Touch of Evil	50th Anniversary Edition
2009	North by Northwest	50th Anniversary Edition
2009	The Wizard of Oz	70th Anniversary Edition - Two Disc Special Edition
2009	Yentl	Two Disc Director's Extended Edition
2009	To Catch a Thief	The Centennial Collection (Vol. 6)
2009	The Long, Hot Summer, Rally Round the Flag, Boys!, From the Terrace, Exodus, The Hustler, Hemingway's Adventures of a Young Man, What a Way to Go!, Butch Cassidy and the Sundance Kid, The Towering Inferno, and The Verdict	Paul Newman - The Tribute Collection
2009	Gone with the Wind	Two Disc 70th Anniversary Edition
2011	West Side Story	50th Anniversary Edition
2011	A Clockwork Orange	40th Anniversary Edition
2011	Citizen Kane	Ultimate Collector's Edition
2011	Blow Out	
2011	Once Upon a Time in the West	
