= Ella Fitzgerald Sings the Irving Berlin Song Book =

Studio album by Ella Fitzgerald
- Released: 1958
- Recorded: March 13–19, 1958
- Genre: Jazz
- Length: 94:50
- Label: Verve
- Producer: Norman Granz

Ella Fitzgerald chronology
Ella Swings Lightly (1958)	Ella Fitzgerald Sings the Irving Berlin Song Book (1958)	Porgy and Bess (1959)

Ella Fitzgerald Sings the Irving Berlin Song Book is a 1958 studio album by the American jazz singer Ella Fitzgerald, with a studio orchestra conducted and arranged by Paul Weston, focusing on the songs of Irving Berlin. It was part of the popular and influential Songbook series.

== Grammy Awards ==
At the inaugural Grammy Awards, Ella Fitzgerald Sings the Irving Berlin Song Book was nominated for the Grammy Award for Album of the Year. Fitzgerald won the Grammy Award for Best Vocal Performance, Female for her performance on the album.

== Reception ==
Professional ratings
Review scores
Source	Rating
AllMusic	4.5/5 stars
The Encyclopedia of Popular Music	5/5 stars
The Penguin Guide to Jazz Recordings	3.5/4 stars
The Rolling Stone Album Guide	4.5/5 stars

In a review for AllMusic, Ronnie D. Lankford, Jr. wrote: "For fans who have enjoyed other songbook recordings, this reissue is a must-have; for those unfamiliar with Fitzgerald's songbook work, this is an excellent place to start."

David Adler of All About Jazz called the album "essential in any music library," and commented: "Ella Fitzgerald's talent speaks for itself, as does Berlin's. The compatibility of these two American legends is unmistakable."

== Track listing ==
For the 2-LP set originally released on the Verve label in 1958: Verve MGV 4019-2.

Side One:

1. "Let's Face the Music and Dance" – 2:57
2. "You're Laughing at Me" – 3:18
3. "Let Yourself Go" – 2:20
4. "You Can Have Him" – 3:47
5. "Russian Lullaby" – 1:55
6. "Puttin' On the Ritz" – 2:18
7. "Get Thee Behind Me Satan" – 3:49
8. "Alexander's Ragtime Band" – 2:43

Side Two:

1. "Top Hat, White Tie and Tails" – 2:36
2. "How About Me?" – 3:17
3. "Cheek to Cheek" – 3:48
4. "I Used to Be Color Blind" – 2:34
5. "Lazy" – 2:40
6. "How Deep Is the Ocean?" – 3:11
7. "All by Myself" – 2:29
8. "Remember" – 3:26

Side Three:

1. "Supper Time" – 3:19
2. "How's Chances?" – 2:48
3. "Heat Wave" – 2:25
4. "Isn't This a Lovely Day?" – 3:29
5. "You Keep Coming Back Like a Song" – 3:35
6. "Reaching for the Moon" – 2:18
7. "Slumming on Park Avenue" – 2:24

Side Four:

1. "The Song Is Ended (but the Melody Lingers On)" (lyrics by Beda Loehner) – 2:30
2. "I'm Putting All My Eggs in One Basket" – 3:01
3. "Now it Can Be Told" – 3:12
4. "Always" – 3:09
5. "It's a Lovely Day Today" – 2:28
6. "Change Partners" – 3:18
7. "No Strings (I'm Fancy Free)" – 3:03
8. "I've Got My Love to Keep Me Warm" – 3:00

Bonus Track; Issued on the Verve 2000 2CD re-issue, Verve 830533-2

32."Blue Skies" – 3:43 (Note: This track was added to later vinyl re-issues)

All music and lyrics written by Irving Berlin.

== Personnel ==
- Ella Fitzgerald - vocals
- Paul Weston – arranger, conductor
