= Follow the Fleet =

1936 film by Mark Sandrich

- original theatrical poster
- Directed by: Mark Sandrich
- Written by: Allan Scott; Dwight Taylor; Lew Lipton (add'l dialogue)
- Based on: Shore Leave; 1922 play by Hubert Osborne
- Produced by: Pandro S. Berman
- Starring: Fred Astaire; Ginger Rogers; Betty Grable; Randolph Scott
- Cinematography: David Abel
- Edited by: Henry Berman
- Music by: Irving Berlin; Max Steiner
- Production company: RKO Radio Pictures
- Distributed by: RKO Radio Pictures
- Release date: February 20, 1936 (U.S.)
- Running time: 110 minutes
- Country: United States
- Language: English
- Budget: $747,000
- Box office: $2,727,000

Follow the Fleet is a 1936 American musical comedy film with a nautical theme starring Fred Astaire and Ginger Rogers in their fifth collaboration as dance partners. It also features Randolph Scott, Harriet Hilliard, and Astrid Allwyn, with music and lyrics by Irving Berlin. Lucille Ball and Betty Grable also appear, in supporting roles. The film was directed by Mark Sandrich with script by Allan Scott and Dwight Taylor based on the 1922 play Shore Leave by Hubert Osborne.

Follow the Fleet was extremely successful at the box office, and during 1936, Astaire's recorded versions of "Let Yourself Go", "I'm Putting all My Eggs in One Basket", and "Let's Face the Music and Dance" reached their highest positions of 3rd, 2nd, 3rd respectively in the US Hit Parade. Harriet Hilliard and Tony Martin made their screen debuts in this film. Ironically, Martin would later star in Hit the Deck, the second of two films based on the identically titled stage musical, which, like Follow the Fleet, was based on the novel Shore Leave.

RKO borrowed Randolph Scott from Paramount and Astrid Allwyn from Fox for the production.

== Plot ==
Seaman "Bake" Baker and Sherry are former dance partners, now separated, with Baker in the Navy and Sherry working as a dance hostess in a San Francisco ballroom, Paradise.

Bake visits the ballroom with his Navy buddy "Bilge" during a period of liberty, reuniting with Sherry (but costing her job), while Bilge is initially attracted to Sherry's sister Connie. When Connie begins to talk about marriage, Bilge quickly diverts his attention towards a friend of Sherry's, Iris, a divorced socialite.

The sailors return to sea while Connie seeks to raise money to salvage her deceased sea-captain father's sailing ship. When the boys return to San Francisco, Bake attempts to get Sherry a job in a Broadway show, but fails amidst a flurry of mistaken identities and misunderstandings. He redeems himself by staging a benefit show which raises the final seven hundred dollars needed to refurbish the ship – although he has to jump ship in order to do so. Bilge, now a chief petty officer, is ordered to locate and arrest him, but allows Bake to complete the show.

After the concert, Bake and Sherry are offered a show on Broadway, which A.W.O.L. Bake accepts on the proviso that Sherry asks him to marry her. Of course, he first has to be sent to the brig and take his punishment.

== Cast ==
- Fred Astaire as Bake Baker
- Ginger Rogers as Sherry Martin
- Randolph Scott as Bilge Smith
- Harriet Hilliard as Connie Martin
- Astrid Allwyn as Mrs. Iris Manning
- Betty Grable as trio singer
- Harry Beresford as Captain Hickey
- Russell Hicks as Nolan
- Brooks Benedict as David Sullivan
- Ray Mayer as Dopey Williams
- Lucille Ball as Kitty Collins
- Tony Martin as sailor
- Jane Hamilton as Paradise Ballroom waitress
- Doris Lloyd as Mrs. Courtney
- Humphrey Bogart as sailor

Cast notes:

- Singer Harriet Hilliard was later well known as the wife of Ozzie Nelson and the mother of Ricky and David Nelson, who all portrayed themselves on the TV series The Adventures of Ozzie and Harriet.

== Musical numbers ==
Hermes Pan collaborated with Astaire on the choreography. Two songs, "Moonlight Maneuvers" and "With a Smile on My Face" were written for the film but unused.

- "We Saw The Sea": The film introduces Astaire with this song.
- "Let Yourself Go": Backed by a trio which includes Betty Grable, a nautically-attired Rogers sings this Berlin standard, which is followed, after an interlude (which includes the 'Get Thee Behind Me' song from Harriet Hilliard), by a comic tap duet with Astaire. This routine begins as a competitive challenge between Astaire-Rogers and another couple (Bob Cromer and Dorothy Fleischman, who soon withdraw) and develops into an energetic duet with much emphasis on galloping kicks, leg wiggling and scampering moves.
- "Get Thee Behind Me Satan": Sung by Harriet Hilliard, this number was originally intended for Rogers in Top Hat.
- "I'd Rather Lead A Band": After singing this number Astaire embarks on a tap solo in which he dances on, off and around the beat – an ability for which he had long been famous in theatre. After leading the band in the song, he discards the baton and begins the solo part of his routine. After this, he is joined by a chorus of sailors who are alternately led and challenged by him.
- "Let Yourself Go" (solo dance): This is Ginger Rogers' only solo tap dance in her ten films with Astaire.
- "But Where Are You?": Sung by Harriet Hilliard.
- "I'm Putting All My Eggs in One Basket": As in the "I Won't Dance" number from Roberta, the song is preceded by a solo piano display by Astaire – a playing style he termed his "feelthy piano". Then Astaire and Rogers sing alternate choruses before embarking on a comic dance duet which plays on the notion of both dancers being unable to keep in step with each other. Incidentally, Lucille Ball appears just before this number to put a sailor admirer down with the line "Tell me little boy, did you get a whistle or a baseball bat with that suit?"
- "Let's Face the Music and Dance": Astaire sings this to Rogers after which the dance begins slowly and culminates in a static exit pose. The dance is filmed in one continuous shot lasting two minutes and fifty seconds. During the first take, Rogers's dress, which was heavily weighted so as to achieve a controlled swirling action, hit Astaire in the face midway through the routine, though the effect is barely discernible. He nonetheless selected this take out of twenty overall for the final picture. The set – designed by Carroll Clark under the direction of Van Nest Polglase – is frequently cited as a leading example of Art Deco-influenced art direction known as Hollywood Moderne. Film clips of this routine were featured in the 1981 film Pennies from Heaven – detested by Astaire, – where it was also reinterpreted by Steve Martin and Bernadette Peters with revised choreography by Danny Daniels.

== Reception ==
Contemporary reviews were positive. "Even though it is not the best of [Astaire and Rogers's] series, it still is good enough to take the head of this year's class in song and dance entertainment," wrote Frank S. Nugent in The New York Times. "They tap as gayly, waltz as beautifully and disagree as merrily as ever."

"With Ginger Rogers once again opposite, and the Irving Berlin music to dance to and sing, Astaire once more legs himself and his picture into the big time entertainment class", Variety wrote in a positive review, although it found the 110 minute running time "way overboard" and suggested it could have benefited from being cut by 20 minutes.

"Well loaded with entertainment for mass satisfaction", reported Film Daily.

John Mosher of The New Yorker wrote that "Fred Astaire bobs at his best ... I don't think he's done any better stepping anywhere then he does in this picture, and trim little Ginger Rogers keeps up with him all the time." They were enough, Mosher wrote, to overcome the film's excessive length and a plot that lacked "any of the lightness of the Astaire feet."

Writing for The Spectator in 1936, Graham Greene gave the film a mildly good review, describing it as Fred Astaire's "the best since Gay Divorce". Comparing the acting of Astaire to the animated character Mickey Mouse, Greene suggests that the two are alike in "break[ing] the laws of nature". However, Greene draws the line at comparing Ginger Rogers to Minnie. Greene also denounced the bleep censorship introduced by the British Board of Film Censors in removing the word "Satan" from the Hilliard song "Get Thee Behind Me Satan".

Dance commentators Arlene Croce and John Mueller point out that, aside from the obvious weakness, a discursive and overlong plot lacking quality specialist comedians, the film contains some of the Astaire-Rogers partnership's most prized duets, not least the iconic "Let's Face the Music and Dance". According to Arlene Croce: "One reason the numbers in Follow the Fleet are as great as they are is that Rogers had improved remarkably as a dancer. Under Astaire's coaching she had developed extraordinary range, and the numbers in the film are designed to show it off." That this film's remarkable score was produced immediately after his smash-hit score for Top Hat is perhaps testimony to Berlin's claim that Astaire's abilities inspired him to deliver some of his finest work. As an actor, however, Astaire makes an unconvincing attempt at shedding the wealthy man-about-town image by donning a sailor's uniform, while Rogers, in this her fifth pairing with Astaire, brings her usual comedic and dramatic flair to bear on her role as a nightclub entertainer.

The film is recognized by American Film Institute in these lists:

- 2006: AFI's Greatest Movie Musicals – Nominated

== Box office ==
The film earned $1,532,000 in the US and Canada and $1,175,000 elsewhere making a profit of $945,000. This was slightly down on that for Top Hat but was still among RKO's most popular movies of the decade.

It was the 14th most popular film at the British box office in 1935–1936.
