= Carefree (film) =

1938 film by Mark Sandrich

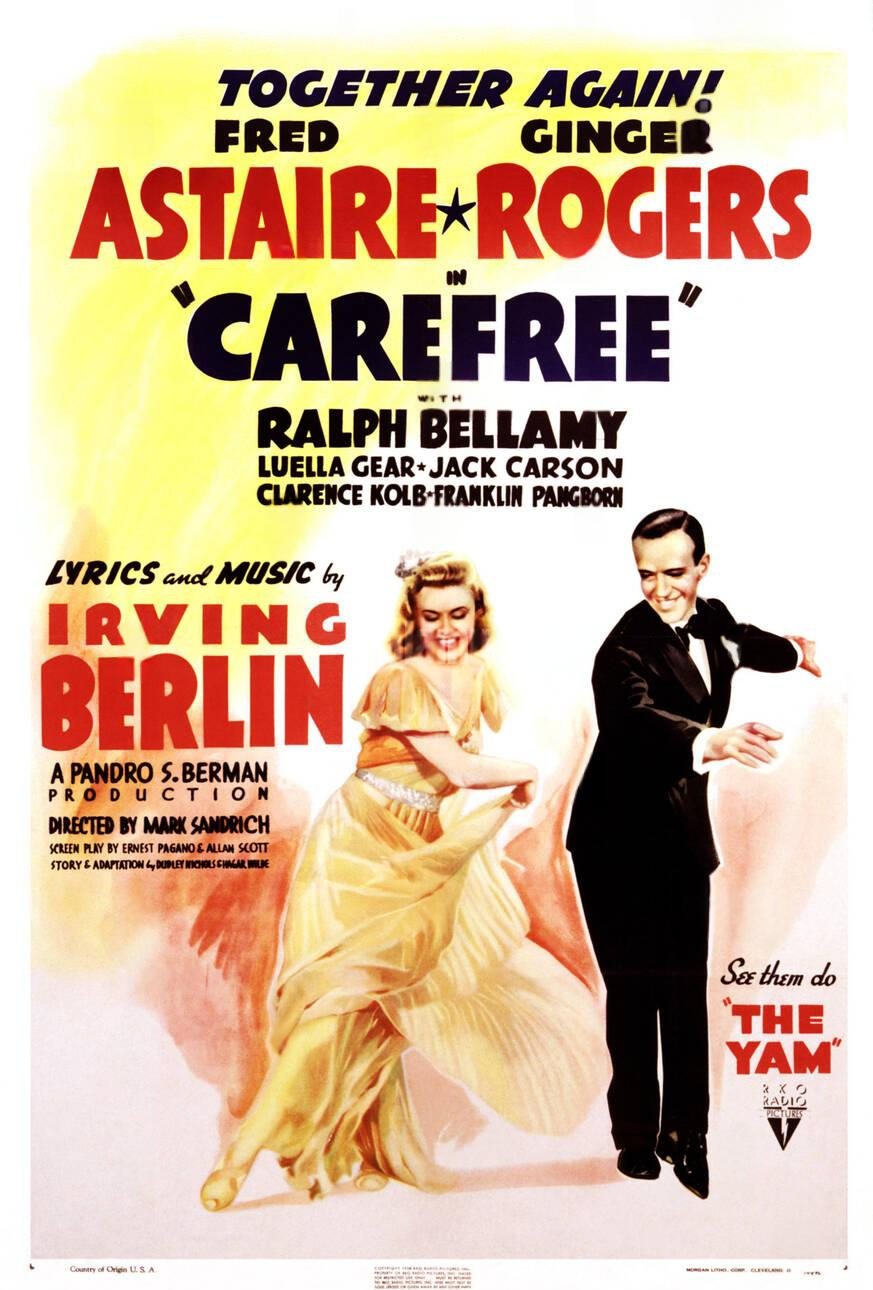
- Theatrical release poster
- Directed by: Mark Sandrich
- Written by: Screenplay: Allan Scott; Ernest Pagano; Story and adaptation: Dudley Nichols; Hagar Wilde; Original idea: Marian Ainslee; Guy Endore
- Produced by: Pandro S. Berman
- Starring: Fred Astaire; Ginger Rogers; Ralph Bellamy; Luella Gear; Jack Carson; Clarence Kolb; Franklin Pangborn
- Cinematography: Robert De Grasse
- Edited by: William Hamilton
- Music by: Irving Berlin
- Production company: RKO Radio Pictures
- Distributed by: RKO Radio Pictures
- Release date: September 2, 1938
- Running time: 83 minutes
- Country: United States
- Language: English
- Budget: $1,253,000
- Box office: $1,731,000

Carefree is a 1938 American musical romantic comedy film directed by Mark Sandrich and starring Fred Astaire, Ginger Rogers, and Ralph Bellamy. With a plot similar to screwball comedies of the period, Carefree is the shortest of the Astaire–Rogers films, featuring only four musical numbers. Carefree is often remembered as the film in which Astaire and Rogers shared a long on-screen kiss at the conclusion of their dance to "I Used to Be Color Blind"; all previous kisses having been either quick pecks or simply implied.

Carefree was a reunion for the team of Astaire and Rogers after a brief hiatus following Shall We Dance and six other previous RKO pictures. The next film in the series, The Story of Vernon and Irene Castle (1939), would be their final RKO film together, although they would reunite in 1949 for MGM's The Barkleys of Broadway.

== Plot ==
Stephen Arden urges his best friend, psychiatrist Dr. Tony Flagg, to psychoanalyze his fiancée, radio singer Amanda Cooper, who has broken off their engagement for the third time. Tony reluctantly agrees, and before meeting Amanda, he records his opinion of her into his dictaphone, describing her as a "dizzy, silly, maladjusted female who can't make up her mind". Tony then ushers Amanda into his office before rushing off to the laboratory, and while waiting alone, she accidentally overhears his dictaphone recording, upsetting her. When Tony returns, he attempts to explain the principle of psychoanalysis to Amanda, but she rebuffs him and leaves, much to his confusion.

The next day, Stephen invites Tony to a country club so he can continue his analysis of Amanda. Eventually, she admits to Tony that she was angry after overhearing his recording, and he apologizes. To determine the root cause of Amanda's fear of commitment, Tony intends to probe her subconscious mind and interpret her dreams. Since Amanda maintains that she does not dream, Tony orders her to have a meal of bizarre food combinations over dinner in order to induce dreams. That night, Amanda dreams of dancing with Tony, culminating in a kiss.

The next day in Tony's office, Amanda is too embarrassed to tell him about her dream and instead invents a convoluted recurring nightmare, in which she is both Little Red Riding Hood and the Big Bad Wolf and is then chased by vicious squirrels. Convinced that he has found "the most beautiful case of complex maladjustment", Tony gives Amanda an anesthetic to lower her inhibitions. After Tony leaves the examination room, Stephen bursts in and reminds Amanda that she is due to perform on a radio show very shortly, unaware that she is under the influence of the anesthetic. The drugged Amanda breaks a pane of glass, insults the sponsor of the radio show, and kicks a policeman.

That evening, Amanda confides in her aunt Cora that she loves Tony, before the women are joined by Tony, Stephen, and Judge Joe Travers for dinner. When Amanda tries to break up with Stephen, he misinterprets her words and assumes that she has finally agreed to marry him. Stephen excitedly announces his engagement to the others, thanking Tony for his help. Amanda then asks Tony for a dance, whereupon she confesses her love for him. The next day, Tony hypnotizes Amanda into thinking that she wants to marry Stephen and that men like Tony "should be shot down like dogs". Tony soon realizes that he is in love with Amanda, only to find that she has left his office.

Still hypnotized, Amanda finds Stephen shooting skeet with Judge Travers at the country club. When Tony arrives, Amanda grabs a shotgun and starts shooting at him until he snaps her out of her trance. After Tony explains the situation to Stephen, including his newfound love for Amanda, Stephen accuses Tony of trying to steal his fiancée, and convinces Judge Travers to issue a restraining order that prevents Tony from seeing Amanda. Crashing Amanda and Stephen's engagement party, Tony schemes with his assistant Connors to find Amanda alone, but his attempts to re-hypnotize her are foiled by Stephen.

On Amanda and Stephen's wedding day, Tony and Connors sneak in with Cora's help. Tony intends to knock Amanda unconscious with a punch so he can hypnotize her, but cannot bring himself to do it when he comes face-to-face with her. Stephen barges in and aims a punch at Tony but accidentally knocks out Amanda instead. While Cora and Connors restrain Stephen, Tony tells an unconscious Amanda that he loves her. Amanda, sporting a black eye, walks down the aisle with Tony.

== Cast ==
- Fred Astaire as Tony Flagg
- Ginger Rogers as Amanda Cooper
- Ralph Bellamy as Stephen Arden
- Luella Gear as Aunt Cora
- Jack Carson as Thomas Connors
- Clarence Kolb as Judge Joe Travers
- Franklin Pangborn as Roland Hunter
- Walter Kingsford as Dr. Powers
- Kay Sutton as Miss Adams
- Hattie McDaniel as Hattie (uncredited)
- James Finlayson as man on golf course (uncredited)
- Paul Guilfoyle as elevator starter (uncredited)

== Production ==
Carefree was in production from April 14 to 15, 1938 (Astaire's golfing dance), and from May 9 to July 21. Location filming was done at the Columbia Ranch in Burbank, California, and at Busch Gardens in Pasadena, California. RKO borrowed Ralph Bellamy from Columbia Pictures for this film.

The "I Used to Be Color Blind" number was planned to be a Technicolor sequence in an otherwise black-and-white film. The film as released is entirely black-and-white.

Astaire did not like "mushy love scenes", and preferred that sex between him and Rogers be confined to their dances. Because rumors sprang up that Astaire's wife would not let him kiss onscreen, or that Rogers and Astaire didn't like each other, Astaire agreed to the long kiss at the end of "I Used to Be Color Blind", "to make up for all the kisses I had not given Ginger for all those years."

Besides the number "Let's Make the Most of Our Dream", another scene that was dropped from the released film was one where Astaire tries to analyze a scatter-brained patient, played by Grace Hayle.

The film was released in the United States on September 2, 1938. The previous Astaire–Rogers film, Shall We Dance, had been released in May 1937, and the 16-month gap between the films was the longest between the duo's films to that date.

== Songs ==
The entire score for Carefree was written by Irving Berlin, and except for "Change Partners", which he had written for Astaire and Rogers years before, he wrote all songs over the course of a few days, while on vacation in Phoenix, Arizona. An army of uncredited orchestrators contributed to the catchy settings of the tunes, principally among them Broadway's Robert Russell Bennett and future MGM stalwart Conrad Salinger.

As usual, Astaire created the choreography, with the help of his principal collaborator Hermes Pan. In preparation for The Story of Vernon and Irene Castle (1939), the Astaire–Rogers film which was already scheduled to follow Carefree, the choreography for this film contains more lifts than usual.

- "Since They Turned 'Loch Lomond' into Swing" – Fred Astaire came up with the idea of hitting golf balls for this number, and spent two weeks rehearsing it. It was shot three weeks before the rest of the film, with Astaire performing to a piano track – the orchestrated arrangement was added later. Because of the difficulty of the action, the performance was pieced together from multiple takes, which was very unusual for Astaire, who preferred his dance numbers to be made from a minimum number of long takes.
- "I Used to Be Color Blind" – The dance for this number was shot at four times normal speed to create the slow-motion effect seen when the film is shown at normal speed.
- "The Night Is Filled with Music" (instrumental) – RKO had hired Ray Hendricks to sing this song, but it was dropped from the production and survived only as an instrumental.
- "The Yam" – Fred Astaire reportedly thought this song was silly, and refused to sing it, which is why Ginger Rogers sings it alone – although they do dance together after the vocal section. Nevertheless, Astaire recorded it and "The Yam Step" with Ray Noble and His Orchestra in 1938 with more lyrics than were used in the film recording. That release included a B-side with comedic dialogue and instruction on the steps of the dance.
- "Change Partners" – The only song from this film which had an afterlife, "Change Partners" was nominated for an Academy Award.

== Reception ==
=== Box office ===
The film earned $1,113,000 in the United States and Canada and $618,000 elsewhere, but according to RKO records, it still lost the studio $68,000.

=== Critical response ===
Carefree received generally mixed reviews when it was released, although Motion Picture Herald critic William R. Weaver called it "the greatest Astaire–Rogers picture."

=== Accolades ===
Carefree was received three nominations at the 11th Academy Awards: Best Art Direction (Van Nest Polglase), Best Music (Scoring) (Victor Baravalle), and Best Music (Song) for "Change Partners", written by Irving Berlin.
