= Carioca (1933 song) =

Song and dance for the 1933 film Flying Down to Rio

"The Carioca" is a 1933 popular song with music by Vincent Youmans and lyrics by Edward Eliscu and Gus Kahn, as well as the name of the dance choreographed to it for the 1933 film Flying Down to Rio. The number was sung in the film by Alice Gentle, Movita Castaneda and Etta Moten and danced by Fred Astaire and Ginger Rogers as part of an extended production dance introducing it. The dance, which was choreographed by the film's dance director, Dave Gould, assisted by Hermes Pan, was based on an earlier stage dance with the same name by Fanchon and Marco. The distinctive feature of the dance was that it was to be danced with the partners' foreheads touching.

The word "Carioca" refers to inhabitants of Rio de Janeiro.

Astaire and Roger's short dance has historical significance, as it was their first screen dance together. Though billed fourth and fifth, many felt they stole the film, which became a big hit for RKO. The song was nominated for the Academy Award for Best Original Song at the 7th Academy Awards, but lost to an even bigger Astaire and Rogers production number, "The Continental" from The Gay Divorcee (1934), their next film together and their first starring vehicle. They were billed by RKO as "The King and Queen of 'The Carioca.'"

While the song has become a jazz standard, the dance did not have longevity. Following the success of Flying Down to Rio, an attempt was made to propagate a new ballroom dance after Astaire and Roger's routine, without much success. It was a mixture of samba, maxixe, foxtrot and rhumba.

A French cover of the song was introduced in the comedy movie La Cité de la peur (1994) along with a dance, also meant in a humoristic way. Both the song and the dance appear in the film that takes place in Cannes during the Cannes film festival in France, and have become a reference for a whole generation in France. 25 years later, in May 2019, the Carioca scene of the movie was celebrated in Cannes with a flashmob dance and by the actors themselves who danced again the mythic scene included in "La Cité de la Peur".

== Notable recordings ==
- Max Steiner and the RKO Orchestra (1933) - one of the earliest recordings issued directly from the soundtrack
- Artie Shaw and His Orchestra (1939)
- Chico O'Farrill and His Orchestra - Jazz North of the Border and South of the Border (1951)
- The Andrews Sisters (1951) Decca– 27757 USA
- Fred Astaire - The Astaire Story (1952), with the Oscar Peterson Sextet
- Oscar Peterson - Oscar Peterson Plays Vincent Youmans (1954)
- The Art Van Damme Quintet - The Van Damme Sound (1954)
- Hampton Hawes - Hampton Hawes Trio (1955)
- Jack Jones - Shall We Dance (1961)
- Jonathan and Darlene Edwards - Songs For Sheiks and Flappers (1967) - In this cover of the song, "Darlene Edwards" (in reality singer Jo Stafford) deliberately sings the lyrics off-key. The track gained attention when it was used under the opening and closing credits of the 1977 film The Kentucky Fried Movie.
- Mel Tormé - Mel Tormé and the Marty Paich Dektette – In Concert Tokyo (1988)
- Jill Gomez - South of the border - National Philharmonic Orchestra of London / Barry Wordsworth / Nettle and Markham Piano Duo - arr. Palmer' (1990)
- Claude Tissendier Quartet - The Liquorice Stick (2003)
- Caetano Veloso - A Foreign Sound (2004)
- Stevie Holland - Before Love Has Gone (2008)
- Johnny Dankworth - Too Cool For The Blues (2010)
- Christof Sänger Trio - I Follow My Secret Heart (2020)
