= Erwin S. Gelsey =

American screenwriter

- Born: January 1, 1900; New York City, New York
- Died: December 12, 1988; Beverly Hills, California, U.S.
- Occupation: Screenwriter
- Spouse: Lillian Gelsey

Erwin S. Gelsey (January 1, 1900 - December 12, 1988) was an American screenwriter who co-wrote many movies, including Flying Down to Rio, Swing Time, The Big Broadcast of 1937, and Cover Girl.
