= Live at the Albert =

Video by Robbie Williams
- Released: December 2001
- Recorded: Royal Albert Hall; 10 October 2001
- Genre: Pop, jazz
- Length: 1:13:25
- Label: EMI / Capitol
- Director: Hamish Hamilton
- Producer: Leo Lodge

Robbie Williams chronology
Where Egos Dare (2001)	Live at the Albert (2001)	Escape Routes (2002)

"Robbie Williams: Live at the Albert" is a DVD that was released in December 2001 of a concert performed by Robbie Williams on 10 October 2001 at the Royal Albert Hall, a month before the release of the album Swing When You're Winning. It has since been certified 6× Platinum in the United Kingdom and 2× Platinum in Germany.

After the end of the first song ("Have You Met Miss Jones?") he gave this emotive message:

"Good evening, ladies and gentlemen! (...) Tonight is a special show for me, it's a night when I'm going to pay tribute to some of the coolest men who have ever lived, for example Mr. Sammy Davis Jr., Mr. Dean Martin, Mr. Frank Sinatra..."

The DVD included performances of nearly all of the songs from the album, also starring Jonathan Wilkes, Jon Lovitz and Jane Horrocks, as well as a live version of Williams's 'duet' with Sinatra. Rupert Everett emceed and Nicole Kidman attended the show, but neither performed their duets featured on the album (They Can't Take That Away From Me and Somethin' Stupid, respectively); these were the only songs from the album which did not feature live. Live at the Albert received a Grammy Award nomination for Best Long Form Video.

On 13 March 2007, the concert was re-released in High Definition (both in Blu-ray and in HD DVD).

== Track listing ==
1. "Intro"
2. "Have You Met Miss Jones?"
3. "Mack The Knife"
4. "Straighten Up and Fly Right"
5. "Let's Face the Music and Dance"
6. "Well, Did You Evah!" (feat. Jon Lovitz)
7. "The Lady is a Tramp"
8. "Things" (feat. Jane Horrocks)
9. "One for My Baby"
10. "Mr. Bojangles"
11. "I Will Talk and Hollywood Will Listen"
12. "Do Nothin' Till You Hear from Me"
13. "Beyond the Sea"
14. "Me and My Shadow" (feat. Jonathan Wilkes)
15. "Ain't That a Kick in the Head"
16. "It Was a Very Good Year" (featuring a video with Frank Sinatra)
17. "My Way"

== Extras ==
- Well Swung - A behind-the-scenes documentary of the album's recording at Capitol Studios.
- Extra unseen footage
- Photo gallery
- Credits

=== In the Blu-ray Disc/HD DVD version ===
- Great performance: Robbie in High Definition
- They Can't Take That Away From Me - Gallery
- Exclusive backstage and aftershow footage

== Certifications ==
Certifications for Live at the Albert
Region	Certification	Certified units/sales
Germany (BVMI)	2× Platinum	100,000^{^}
^{^} Shipments figures based on certification alone.
