= Pick Yourself Up =

1936 song by Fred Astaire

Song by Fred Astaire
- B-side: "The Way You Look Tonight"
- Published: 1936 by T.B. Harms
- Released: August 1936
- Recorded: July 26, 1936
- Studio: Los Angeles, California
- Genre: Jazz, Pop Vocal
- Label: Brunswick 7717
- Composer: Jerome Kern
- Lyricist: Dorothy Fields

Fred Astaire singles chronology
"A Fine Romance" (1936)	"Pick Yourself Up" (1936)	"Never Gonna Dance" (1936)

"Pick Yourself Up" is a popular song composed in 1936 by Jerome Kern, with lyrics by Dorothy Fields. It has a verse and chorus, as well as a third section, though the third section is often omitted in recordings. Like most popular songs of the era it features a 32 bar chorus, though with an extended coda.

== Background ==
The song was written for the film Swing Time (1936), where it was introduced by Fred Astaire and Ginger Rogers. Rogers plays a dance instructor whom Astaire follows into her studio; he pretends to have "two left feet" in order to get her to dance with him. Astaire sings the verse to her and she responds with the chorus. After an interlude, they dance to the tune. (Author John Mueller has written their dance "is one of the very greatest of Astaire's playful duets: boundlessly joyous, endlessly re-seeable.") In 1936, Astaire recorded the song on his own for the Brunswick label.

The song has been covered many times, including by the following:

- Lew Stone 1936
- Nat King Cole 1944
- George Shearing 1950
- Nat King Cole and George Shearing 1962
- Anita O’Day Pick Yourself Up with Anita O'Day 1957
- Dakota Staton 1961
- Ella Fitzgerald and Nelson Riddle 1962
- Frank Sinatra arranged and conducted by Neal Hefti 1962
- Mel Tormé 1988
- Natalie Cole 1996
- Diana Krall 1999
- Peter Tosh 1978 As "Pick Myself Up"
- Dianne Reeves 2005
- Molly Ringwald 2013
- Wilford Brimley with The Jeff Hamilton Trio 2013
- Gregory Porter 2017

== Popular culture ==
- The tune served as the theme song for the short-lived 1955–56 prime time television variety series The Johnny Carson Show. It was also the theme tune for the 1984-1986 ITV British sitcom Fresh Fields and the 1989–1991 sequel French Fields, both starring Julia McKenzie and Anton Rodgers. It was occasionally used during filmed remotes on Late Night with David Letterman.
- Nancy Walker performed the song on an episode of The Muppet Show with Fozzie Bear.
- Kate Winslet performed the song while hosting Saturday Night Live in 2004.
- On 20 January 2009, the 44th President of the United States, Barack Obama, in his inauguration speech, quoted the lyrics in the song, saying "Starting today, we must pick ourselves up, dust ourselves off, and begin again the work of remaking America." Frank Rich linked the lyric to Fields and the movie in The New York Times, writing that it was "one subtle whiff of the Great Depression" in the address.
- Nat King Cole's version was also featured in the Breaking Bad episode "Gliding Over All".
