= Allan Scott (American screenwriter) =

American screenwriter (1906–1995)

- Born: May 23, 1906; Arlington, New Jersey, U.S.
- Died: April 13, 1995 (aged 88); Santa Monica, California, U.S.
- Occupation: Screenwriter
- Children: Pippa Scott
- Relatives: Adrian Scott (brother)

Allan Scott (May 23, 1906 – April 13, 1995) was a screenwriter who was nominated for an Academy Award for So Proudly We Hail!.

He co-wrote the screenplays for a number of Fred Astaire and Ginger Rogers films: Top Hat (1935), Follow the Fleet (1936), Swing Time (1936), Shall We Dance (1937), and Carefree (1938), as well as Roberta (1935), in which they played supporting roles.

== Biography ==
Scott was born in Arlington, New Jersey and attended Oxford on a scholarship. He wrote his first produced Broadway play in 1932. Scott helped adapt the play The Gay Divorce for London. This saw him receive a Hollywood offer from RKO. While there he helped Mark Sandrich on the script for the film of The Gay Divorce This led to Scott's first proper film assignment, rewriting Village Tale. Sandrich asked Scott to rewrite Top Hat which led to a long collaboration between writer and director.

== Filmography ==
As screenwriter, unless otherwise noted.

- Goodbye Again (1933) (play)
- Let's Try Again (1934) (uncredited)
- By Your Leave (1934)
- Roberta (1935)
- Village Tale (1935)
- Top Hat (1935)
- In Person (1935)
- I Dream Too Much (1935) (uncredited add. dialogue)
- Follow the Fleet (1936)
- Swing Time (1936)
- Quality Street (1937)
- Shall We Dance (1937)
- Wise Girl (1937) (also story)
- Joy of Living (1938)
- Carefree (1938) (also uncredited minor acting role)
- Man About Town (1939)
- Fifth Avenue Girl (1939)
- Primrose Path (1940)
- Lucky Partners (1940)
- Honeymoon for Three (1941) (play)
- Sun Valley Serenade (1941) (uncredited contributing writer)
- Skylark (1941)
- Remember the Day (1941)
- So Proudly We Hail! (1943)
- I Love a Soldier (1944)
- Here Come the Waves (1944)
- Blue Skies (1946) (adaptation)
- Let's Dance (1950)
- The Guy Who Came Back (1951)
- Wait till the Sun Shines, Nellie (1952) (adaptation)
- The Four Poster (1952)
- The 5,000 Fingers of Dr. T. (1953)
- Top Secret Affair (1957)
- Quick, Let's Get Married (1964) (Daughter Pippa Scott appears)

== Personal life ==
Allan was the father of actress Pippa Scott and brother of film producer and screenwriter Adrian Scott. He died on 13 April 1995 at St. John's Health Center in Santa Monica, California, at age 88.

== Notes ==
- McGilligan, Patrick (1986). "Allan Scott: a nice life". Backstory : interviews with screenwriters of Hollywood's golden age. University of California. p. 311-333.
