= Victor Baravalle =

Italian composer and conductor

Victor Baravalle (1885–1939) was an Italian-born composer, music director, and conductor, best known for his work on both the stage and film productions of the Jerome Kern and Oscar Hammerstein II musical Show Boat.

Baravalle worked as musical director and conductor for several Broadway musicals, including as conductor for the Greenwich Village Follies in 1921. He conducted the Broadway premiere production of Show Boat in 1927, as well as for the original stage productions of nine other Jerome Kern shows, among them The Cat and the Fiddle, Music in the Air, and Roberta. He continued a connection with Jules Bledsoe, the star of Show Boat, and conducted the New York Philharmonic Orchestra for Bledsoe's concert in 1929. Among the other stage musicals that he conducted was the first American production of The White Horse Inn.

In 1929, he was musical director for RKO Pictures, at the time known as Radio Pictures, until Max Steiner took over in 1930. He conducted the early film musical Tanned Legs (1929). He became executive head of music for Metro-Goldwyn-Mayer, then Metro, in 1935. He also conducted the orchestra for the sound prologue for the early sound version of Show Boat (1929), and for the entire 1936 film version of the show. He was music director for the Rudy Vallée vehicle The Vagabond Lover (1929).

He was the musical director for two of the Fred Astaire-Ginger Rogers films, Carefree (1938) — which earned him an Academy Award nomination for Best Musical Scoring, although it was Irving Berlin who wrote the actual songs in the film—and The Story of Vernon and Irene Castle (1939), which is the last film Astaire and Rogers made together at RKO. He was also musical director for on A Damsel in Distress (1937), another RKO musical production that starred Astaire, Joan Fontaine, George Burns, and Gracie Allen.

He was survived by his widow, Alice Smith Baravelle, and their three children.
