= Herb Magidson =

American popular music lyricist (1906-1986)

Herbert Magidson

Herbert A. Magidson (January 7, 1906 – January 2, 1986) was an American popular lyricist. His work was used in over 23 films and four Broadway revues. He won the first Academy Award for Best Original Song in 1934.

== Life and career ==
Magidson was born and raised in Braddock, Pennsylvania. He had an early interest in the art of magic and was a member of the Pittsburgh Association of Magicians in his youth. He attended the University of Pittsburgh and then worked briefly for a music publisher in New York City. Magidson then moved to Hollywood, Los Angeles, California in 1929 while under contract to Warner Bros. to write music for films. In 1934, he won the first Academy Award for Best Original Song along with Con Conrad for his lyrics to "The Continental", used in The Gay Divorcee (1934) starring Fred Astaire and Ginger Rogers. Magidson also co-wrote the lyrics to the 1937 Allie Wrubel song "Gone with the Wind" (no connection to the novel of the same name nor used in the 1939 film).

Magidson received Oscar nominations for the songs, "Say a Prayer for the Boys Over There" from the film Hers to Hold (1943), and "I'll Buy That Dream" from the film Sing Your Way Home (1945). He first wrote lyrics for The Show of Shows (1929), and many more films, including: No, No, Nanette (1930), Gift of Gab (1934), The Gay Divorcee (1934), Here's to Romance (1935), George White's 1935 Scandals (1935), King Solomon of Broadway (1935), Miss Pacific Fleet (1935), The Great Ziegfeld (1936), Hats Off (1936), I'd Give My Life (1936), Radio City Revels (1938), and Sing Your Way Home (1945). Magidson had his last hits in 1951, including the song "Happiness".

Magidson collaborated with many songwriters, including Con Conrad, Allie Wrubel, Carl Sigman, Sam H. Stept, and Sammy Fain. He was inducted into the Songwriters Hall of Fame in 1980.

He died at the UCLA Medical Hospital in Beverly Hills, California at the age of 79, five days before his 80th birthday, survived by his wife, Elsie.

== Published songs ==
For a more complete list, see article on Herb Magidson in Songwriters Hall of Fame.

- "Black-Eyed Susan Brown"
- "Conchita Lopez"
- "The Continental" (1934)
- "Enjoy Yourself" (1948)
- "Gone with the Wind" (1937)
- "Good Night, Angel" (1937)
- "H'lo, Baby"
- "Hummin' to Myself"
- "I Can't Love You Any More"
- "I'll Buy That Dream" (1945)
- "I'll Dance at Your Wedding" (1947)
- "I'm Stepping Out With a Memory Tonight"
- "Linger in My Arms a Little Longer, Baby"
- "The Masquerade Is Over"
- "Midnight in Paris"
- "Music, Maestro, Please" (1938)
- "My Impression of You"
- "A Pink Cocktail for a Blue Lady"
- "Roses in December"
- "Say a Prayer for the Boys Over There"
- "Something I Dreamed Last Night"
- "Singin' in the Bathtub" (1929)
- "Twinkle, Twinkle Little Star" [not the nursery tune] (1936)
- "Violins from Nowhere"
