= Change Partners =

1938 song by Irving Berlin

Song by Fred Astaire
- B-side: "I Used to Be Color Blind"
- Published: June 13, 1938 by Irving Berlin, Inc., New York
- Released: July 1938
- Recorded: March 24, 1938
- Studio: Los Angeles, California
- Genre: Jazz, Pop Vocal
- Label: Brunswick 8189
- Songwriter: Irving Berlin

Fred Astaire singles chronology
| "Nice Work If You Can Get It" (1937) | "Change Partners" (1938) | ""The Yam"" (1938) |

"Change Partners" is a popular song written by Irving Berlin for the 1938 film Carefree, in which it was introduced by Fred Astaire. The song was nominated for an Academy Award for Best Original Song in 1938, but lost out to "Thanks for the Memory."

Hit versions in 1938 included those by Astaire, Ozzie Nelson, Jimmy Dorsey and Lawrence Welk. The song reached No. 1 on Billboard's Record Buying Guide.

The song has subsequently been recorded by many artists.

== Notable recordings ==
- Vic Damone – Linger Awhile with Vic Damone (1962)
- Steve Lawrence – for his album Academy Award Losers (1964)
- Frank Sinatra – Francis Albert Sinatra & Antônio Carlos Jobim (1967)
- Bing Crosby – A Couple of Song and Dance Men (1975)
- Andy Williams – Close Enough for Love (1986)
- Barbara Cook – Live from London (1994) (in medley with "I See Your Face")
- Harry Connick, Jr. – Come By Me (1999)
- Jack Jones "Shall we dance?" Kapp 1961
- Sammy Davis Jr. "Sammy Awards" Decca 1959
