= Maladjustment =

Inability to react to environmental demands in psychology

Maladjustment is a term used in psychology to refer the "inability to react successfully and satisfactorily to the demand of one's environment". The term maladjustment can be referred to a wide range of social, biological and psychological conditions.

Maladjustment can be both intrinsic or extrinsic. Intrinsic maladjustment is the disparities between the needs, motivations and evaluations of an individual, with the actual reward gain through experiences. Extrinsic maladjustment on the other hand, is referred to when an individual's behavior does not meet the cultural or social expectation of society.

The causes of maladjustment can be attributed to a wide variety of factors, including: family environment, personal factors, and school-related factors. Maladjustment affects an individual's development and the ability to maintain a positive interpersonal relationship with others. Often maladjustment emerges during early stages of childhood, when a child is in the process of learning methods to solve problem that occurs in interpersonal relationship in their social network. A lack of intervention for individuals who are maladjusted can cause negative effects later on in life.

== Causes ==
Children who are brought up in certain conditions are more prone to maladjustment. There are three main causes associated to maladjustment:

=== Family causes ===
Socially, children that come from broken homes often are maladjusted. Feelings of frustration toward their situation stems from insecurities, and denial of basic needs such as food, clothing and shelter. Children whose parents are unemployed or possess a low socioeconomic status are more prone to maladjustment. Parents who are abusive and highly authoritative can cause harmful effect towards psychological need which are essential for a child to be socially well adjusted. The bond between a parent and child can affect psychological development in adolescents. Conflicts between parent and child relationship can cause adolescents to have poor adjustment. The level of conflict which occur between a parent and child can affect both the child's perception of the relationship with their parents and a child's self-perception. The perception of conflict between parent and child can be attributed to two mechanisms: reciprocal filial belief and perceived threats. Reciprocal filial belief refers to the love, care and affection that a child experience through their parent, it represents the amount of intimacy a child has with his or her parent. High levels of perceived conflict between parent and child reduces feelings of empathy, a child may feel isolated and therefore alienate themselves from their parent, this reduces the amount of reciprocal filial belief. Adolescents with lower levels of reciprocal filial belief are known to show characteristics of a maladjusted individual. Perceived threats can be characterized as the anticipation of damage or harm to oneself during an emotional arousing event that induce a response towards stress. Worry, fear and the inability to cope with stress during conflicts are indicators of a rise in the level of perceived threat in a parent and child relationship. Higher levels of perceived threats in a parent and child relationship may exacerbate negative self-perception and weaken the ability to cope, this intensifies antisocial behavior which is a characteristic associated with maladjustment.

=== Personal causes ===
Children with physical, emotional, or mental problems often have a hard time keeping up socially when compared to their peers. This can cause a child to experience feelings of isolation and limits interaction which brings about maladjustment. Emotion regulation plays a role in maladjustment. Typically, emotions are generally adaptive responses which allow an individual to have the flexibility to change their emotion based on the demand of their environment. Emotional inertia refers to "the degree in which emotional states are resistant to change"; there is a lack of emotional responsiveness due to the resistance of external environmental changes or internal psychological influences. High level of emotional inertia may be indicative of maladjustment, as an individual does not display a typical variability of emotions towards their social surroundings. A high level of emotional inertia may also represent impairment in emotional-regulation skills, which is known to be an indicator of low self-esteem and neuroticism.

=== School related causes ===
Children who are victimized by their peers at school are more at risk of being maladjusted, prone to anxiety, and feelings of insecurity. This affects their attitude towards school, as victimized children are more likely to show dislike towards schools and display high levels of school avoidance. Teachers who display unfair and biased attitudes towards children cause difficulties in their adjustment towards the classroom and school-life. Unhealthy and negative peer influence, such as delinquency, can cause children to be maladjusted in their social environment.

== Associated characteristics ==
There are some characteristics that are associated with maladjustment.

- Nervous behavior. Habits and tics in response to nervousness (e.g. biting fingernails, fidgeting, banging of head, playing with hair, inability to stay still).
- Emotional overreaction and deviation. The tendency to respond to a situation with unnecessarily excessive or extravagant emotions and actions (e.g. avoidance of responsibility due to fear, withdrawal, easily distracted from slightest annoyance, unwarranted anxiety from small mistakes).
- Emotional immaturity. The inability to fully control one's emotion (e.g. indecisiveness, over dependence on other, excessively self-conscious and suspicious, being incapable to work independently, hyperactivity, unreasonable fears and worries, high levels of anxiety).
- Exhibitionist behavior. Behaviors conducted in attempts to gain attention or to portray a positive image (e.g. blame others for one's own failure, high level of overt agreeableness towards authority, physically hurting others).
- Antisocial behavior. Behaviors and acts that showed hostility or aggression to others (e.g. cruelty to others, the use of obscene and abusive language, bullying others, destructive and irresponsible behaviors)
- Psychosomatic disturbances. This can include: complications in bowel movement, nausea and vomiting, overeating, and other pains.

== Negative effects ==
=== Poor academic performance ===
Maladjustment can have an effect on an individual's academic performance. Individuals who have maladjusted behaviors may have a lower commitment to scholastic achievements, poorer test results, higher rate of truancy, and increase risk of dropping out of school.

=== Suicidal behavior ===
In cases where a child suffers from physical or sexual abuse, maladjustment is a risk factor for suicidal behavior. Individuals with a history of childhood abuse may be maladjusted due to their dissatisfaction in social support and the prevalence of an anxious attachment style. Clinical implications suggest that by targeting maladjustment in individuals with history of childhood abuse, the risk of suicidal behavior may be attenuated.

== See also ==
- Adjustment (psychology)
