= Flying Down to Rio =

1933 film by Thornton Freeland

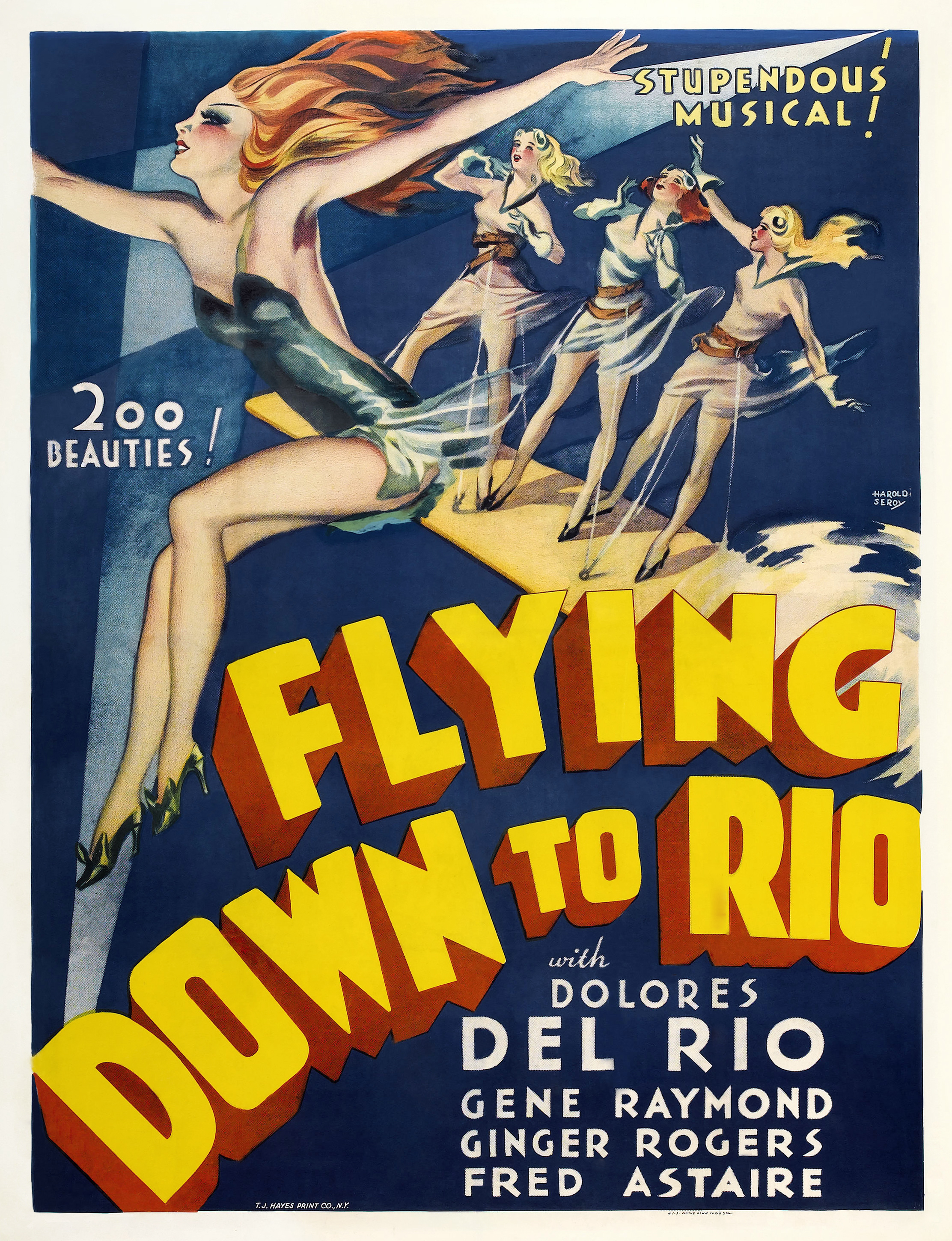
- Film poster by Harold Seroy
- Directed by: Thornton Freeland; George Nicholls Jr. (associate); Ray Lissner (assistant)
- Screenplay by: Cyril Hume; H. W. Hanemann; Erwin Gelsey
- Story by: Lou Brock
- Based on: 1933 unpublished play by Anne Caldwell
- Produced by: Merian C. Cooper; Lou Brock
- Starring: Dolores del Río; Gene Raymond; Ginger Rogers; Fred Astaire
- Cinematography: J. Roy Hunt
- Edited by: Jack Kitchin
- Music by: Songs—Music: Vincent Youmans; Songs—Lyrics: Gus Kahn; Edward Eliscu; Score: Max Steiner
- Production company: RKO Radio Pictures
- Distributed by: RKO Radio Pictures
- Release date: December 21, 1933 (New York)
- Running time: 89 minutes
- Country: United States
- Language: English
- Budget: $462,000
- Box office: $1,545,000

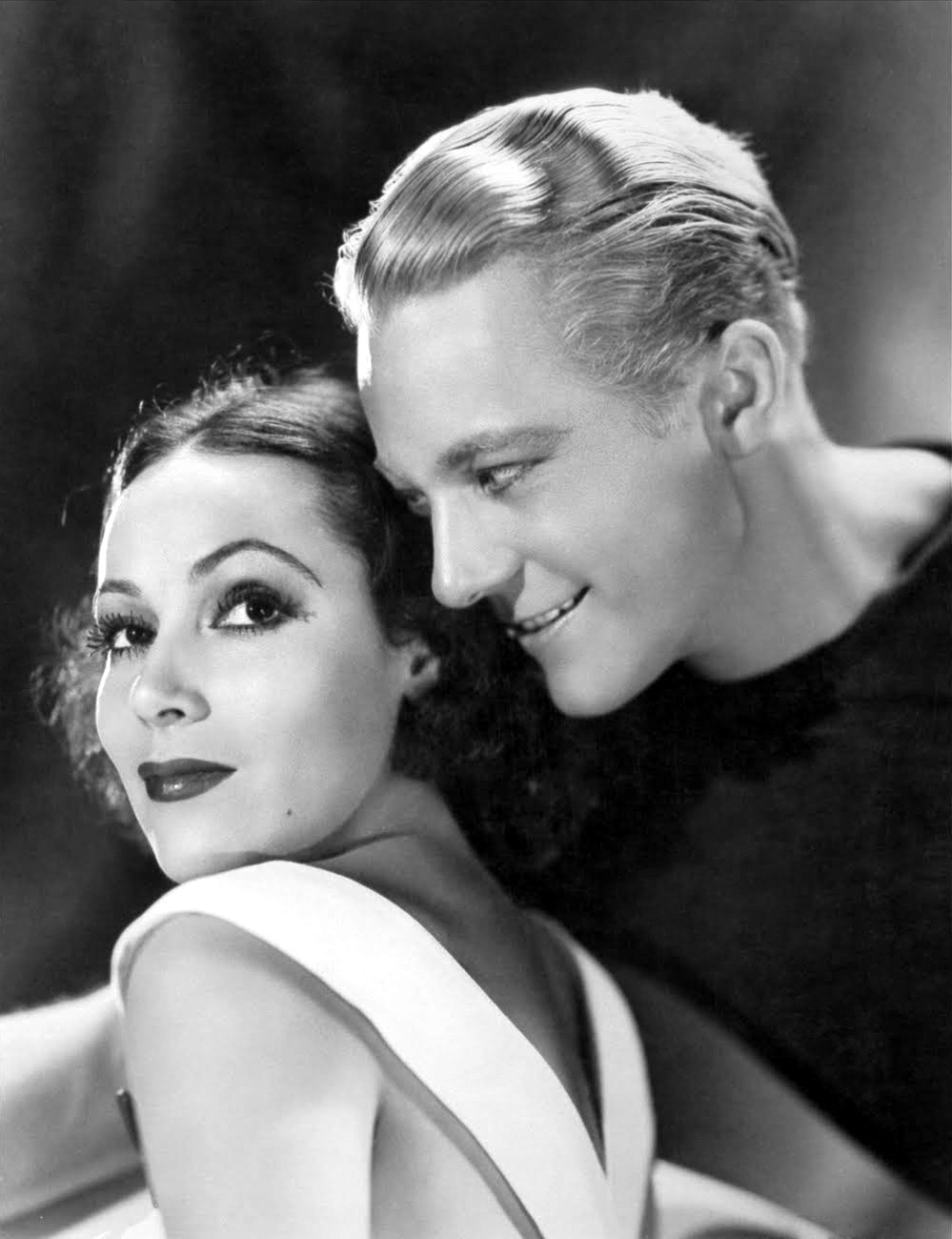
Dolores del Río and Gene Raymond in the film

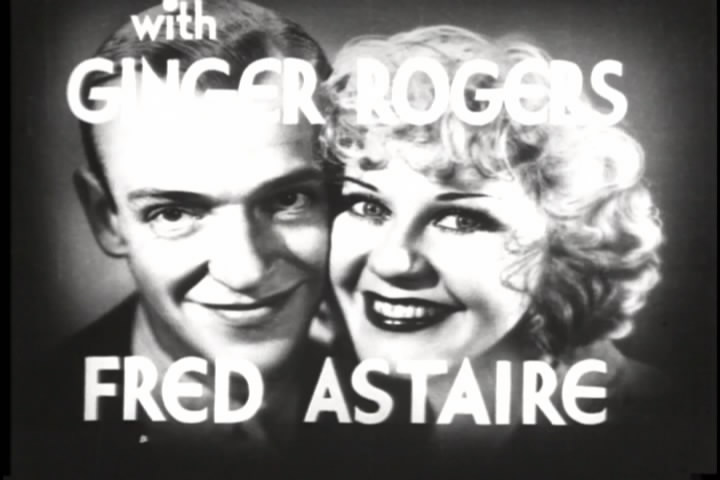
The first screen announcement of the Astaire–Rogers partnership, in the trailer for Flying Down to Rio

Flying Down to Rio is a 1933 American pre-Code musical film most famous for being the first screen pairing of Fred Astaire and Ginger Rogers, although lead actors Dolores del Río and Gene Raymond received top billing. Among the featured players are Franklin Pangborn and Eric Blore. The songs in the film were written by Vincent Youmans (music), Gus Kahn and Edward Eliscu (lyrics), with musical direction and additional music by Max Steiner. During the 7th Academy Awards, the film was nominated for the new category of Best Original Song for "Carioca", but it lost to "The Continental" from The Gay Divorcee, the next Astaire and Rogers film (and their first with top billing).

The black-and-white film, which had a color-tinted sequence, was directed by Thornton Freeland and produced by Merian C. Cooper and Lou Brock. The screenplay was written by Erwin S. Gelsey, H. W. Hanemann and Cyril Hume, based on a story by Lou Brock and a play by Anne Caldwell. Linwood Dunn did the special effects for the celebrated airplane-wing dance sequence at the end of the film. In this film, Dolores del Río became the first major actress to wear a two-piece women's bathing suit onscreen.

The film follows composer Roger Bond as he falls in love with Brazilian woman Belinha De Rezende, although she is actually already engaged to a friend of Roger's. Roger's bandmate Fred Ayres and Ayres' companion Honey Hale support Roger through various musical misadventures.

== Plot ==
Composer Roger Bond and his orchestra are appearing in Miami, with vocalist Honey Hale. Despite the warnings of accordionist and assistant bandleader Fred Ayres, Roger is attracted to the beautiful and flirtatious Belinha in the audience. He leaves the bandstand to pursue her.

Dona Elena, Belinha's chaperone, is informed of this, and arranges for Roger and the band to be fired. But Roger pursues Belinha to Brazil, and organizes an engagement for the band at the Hotel Atlântico in Rio de Janeiro, unaware that the hotel is owned by Belinha's father. Roger persuades Belinha to allow him to fly her there in his private plane, which runs into trouble in-flight, forcing a landing on an apparently deserted island. Under the moonlight, she falls into his arms, while admitting to him that she is already engaged.

In Rio, Roger informs his good friend Julio that he has fallen in love, but finds out that Belinha is engaged to Julio. During rehearsals for the hotel's opening, Fred is told by police that the hotel lacks an entertainment license. When Roger spots a plane overhead, he comes up with the idea of strapping dancing girls to planes, with Fred leading the band and Honey and Julio leading the planes. The show is a great success and the hotel's future guaranteed. Julio gives Belinha up to Roger while Fred and Honey celebrate.

== Cast ==
- Dolores del Río as Belinha De Rezende
- Gene Raymond as Roger Bond
- Raul Roulien as Julio Ribeiro
- Ginger Rogers as Honey Hales
- Fred Astaire as Fred Ayres
- Blanche Friderici as Dona Elena
- Walter Walker, as Belinha's father
- Etta Moten as The Carioca Singer
- Roy D'Arcy as Member Greek Gambling Syndicate
- Maurice Black as Member Greek Gambling Syndicate
- Armand Kaliz as Member Greek Gambling Syndicate
- Paul Porcasi as The Mayor
- Reginald Barlow as Alfredo Vianna (the banker)
- Eric Blore as Mr. Butterbass, Assistant Hotel Manager
- Franklin Pangborn as Hammerstein, Hotel Manager
- Movita Castaneda as The Carioca Singer
- Alice Gentle as The Carioca Singer

== Music ==
All the songs in Flying Down to Rio were written by Vincent Youmans (music) and Gus Kahn and Edward Eliscu (lyrics). The dance director was Dave Gould, assisted by Hermes Pan, who went on to become Astaire's primary collaborator.

- "Flying Down to Rio" – sung by Fred Astaire, danced by Ginger Rogers and the chorus
- "Music Makes Me" – sung by Ginger Rogers, some general dancing
- "Orchids in Moonlight" – sung by Raul Roulien, danced (a bit) by Fred Astaire and Dolores del Rio; this became a popular tango song
- "Carioca" – sung by Alice Gentle, Movita Castaneda and Etta Moten, danced by Fred Astaire, Ginger Rogers and the chorus; this is notable for being Astaire and Rogers' first dance together; they dance with their foreheads touching.

== Reception ==
Mordaunt Hall, The New York Times critic, praised the lavish production and called it (along with the Walt Disney short The Night Before Christmas) "a thoroughly enjoyable entertainment." Sidne Silverman in Variety was less enthused, complaining that "...Rio's story ... lets it down. It’s slow and lacks laughs to the point where average business seems its groove." However, Astaire was singled out for acclaim, asserting "He's distinctly likeable on the screen, the mike is kind to his voice and as a dancer he remains in a class by himself."

The film opened December 21, 1933 at Radio City Music Hall in New York City. It grossed $102,000 in its opening week.

According to RKO records, the film made $923,000 in the United States and Canada and $622,000 elsewhere, resulting in an estimated profit of $480,000.

The film was nominated for the 2006 American Film Institute list AFI's Greatest Movie Musicals, and "Carioca" was nominated for AFI's 100 Years...100 Songs.

The film title was referenced by Roxy Music in their 1972 hit single "Virginia Plain" - "Baby Jane's in Acapulco / We are flying down to Rio".
