= Get Thee Behind Me Satan =

Popular song by Irving Berlin

"Get Thee Behind Me Satan" is a popular song written by Irving Berlin for the 1936 film Follow the Fleet, where it was introduced by Harriet Hilliard. It was originally written for Ginger Rogers in Top Hat (1935).

== Notable recordings ==
- Ella Fitzgerald - Ella Fitzgerald Sings the Irving Berlin Songbook (1958)
