= Carroll Clark =

American art director

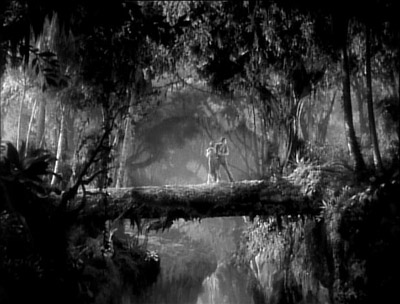
- Born: February 6, 1894; Mountain View, California
- Died: May 17, 1968 (aged 74); Glendale, California
- Occupation: Art director
- Years active: 1927-1968

Carroll Clark (February 6, 1894 – May 17, 1968) was an American art director. He was nominated for seven Academy Awards in the category Best Art Direction. He worked on 173 films between 1927 and 1968. He was born in Mountain View, California and died in Glendale, California.

== Early filmography ==
Year	Film
1927	The Magic Garden
1930	Swing High
1930	Holiday
1930	Her Man
1930	Big Money
1930	Sin Takes a Holiday
1931	The Painted Desert
1931	Lonely Wives
1931	Beyond Victory
1931	Born to Love
1931	Sweepstakes
1931	The Common Law
1931	Rebound
1931	The Big Gamble
1931	Sundown Trail
1931	Smart Woman (uncredited)
1931	Devotion
1931	The Tip Off
1931	Freighters of Destiny
1931	Bad Company
1931	Suicide Fleet
1931	The Big Shot
1932	Partners
1932	Panama Flow
1932	Prestige
1932	A Woman Commands
1932	Lady With a Past
1932	The Saddle Buster
1932	Carnival Boat
1932	Young Bride
1932	Symphony of Six Million
1932	The Roadhouse Murder
1932	State's Attorney
1932	Ghost Valley
1932	Westward Passage
1932	Is My Face Red
1932	What Price Hollywood?
1932	Roar of the Dragon
1932	Beyond the Rockies
1932	Bird of Paradise
1932	The Age of Consent
1932	Thirteen Women
1932	The Most Dangerous Game
1932	Hold 'em Jail
1932	Hell's Highway
1932	Come On Danger!
1932	A Bill of Divorcement
1932	The Phantom of Crestwood
1932	Little Orphan Annie
1932	The Sport Parade
1932	The Conquerors
1932	Rockabye
1932	Renegades of the West
1932	Secrets of the French Police
1933	No Other Woman (uncredited)
1933	The Monkey's Paw
1933	The Great Jasper
1933	King Kong (uncredited)
1933	Cross Fire (uncredited)
1933	Aggie Appleby Maker of Men
1933	The Right to Romance
1933	Flying Down To Rio
1934	Hips, Hips, Hooray!
1934	Spitfire
1934	This Man is Mine
1934	Of Human Bondage
1934	Cockeyed Cavaliers
1934	Bachelor Bait
1934	The Fountain
1934	Down to Their Last Yacht
1934	The Gay Divorcee
1934	Lightning Strikes Twice
1934	The Little Minister
1935	Enchanted April
1941	Playmates
1942	Joan of Paris

== Award Nominations ==
Clark was nominated for seven Academy Awards for Best Art Direction:

- The Gay Divorcee (1934)
- Top Hat (1935)
- A Damsel in Distress (1937)
- Flight for Freedom (1943)
- Step Lively (1944)
- The Absent-Minded Professor (1961)
- Mary Poppins (1964)

== See also ==
- Art Directors Guild Hall of Fame
