= Never Gonna Dance (song) =

1936 song by Fred Astaire

Song by Fred Astaire
- B-side: "Bojangles Of Harlem"
- Published: 1936 by Chappell & Co.
- Released: August 1936
- Recorded: July 26, 1936
- Studio: Los Angeles, California
- Genre: Jazz, Pop Vocal
- Label: Brunswick 7718
- Composer(s): Jerome Kern
- Lyricist(s): Dorothy Fields

Fred Astaire singles chronology
"The Way You Look Tonight" (1936)	"Never Gonna Dance" (1936)	"They Can't Take That Away From Me" (1937)

"Never Gonna Dance" is a song performed by Fred Astaire and danced with Ginger Rogers in their movie Swing Time. The lyrics were written by Dorothy Fields and the music was by Jerome Kern.

This dramatic dance was performed at the end of the movie after John 'Lucky' Garnett (Astaire) finds out Penelope 'Penny' Carroll (Rogers) is engaged to Ricardo 'Ricky' Romero (played by Georges Metaxa). This is a dance of desperation, despair and love. It starts slowly, Lucky not wanting Penny to leave. As she is walking up the stairs, he begins his serenade to her in hopes that she will understand how heartbroken he is over losing her. After he is done singing, he tries to win her back one more time dancing. So, elegantly and desperately, he pulls out all the stops, hoping to change her mind. At first, the dance is slow and somber, but eventually the pace and tempo pick up, and Lucky and Penny seem to be together again. However, in the final movement, Penny twirls out of the room and doesn't come back, leaving Lucky standing there forlorn.

Fred Astaire recorded the song commercially (Brunswick 7718) and it proved popular. Other recordings in 1936 were by Ted Fio Rito and His Orchestra, Shep Fields and His Rippling Rhythm, and by Ruby Newman Rainbow Room Orchestra.
