= Van Nest Polglase =

American art director (1898–1968)

- Born: August 25, 1898; Brooklyn, New York
- Died: December 20, 1968 (aged 70); Los Angeles, California
- Occupation: Art director
- Years active: 1919–1957

Van Nest Polglase (August 25, 1898 – December 20, 1968) was an American art director. He was nominated for six Academy Awards in the category Best Art Direction. Best remembered as head of the design department at RKO Pictures, he worked on 333 films between 1925 and 1957.

He was born in Brooklyn, New York and died in Los Angeles, California.

== Education and early career ==
Polglase studied Beaux-Arts architecture and interior design in New York City where he entered practice with the architectural firm of Berg and Orchard, before moving to Havana in 1917 where he was an associate designer on the Presidential Palace. On his return to New York City in 1919, he signed with Famous Players–Lasky (later reorganised as Paramount) whose art director Wiard Ihnen had recommended him as a draftsman. When Polglase decided to focus on design, he moved to Hollywood, where he designed one of the first American Art Déco sets for The Magnificent Flirt (1928). He worked for MGM until 1932, when he was recruited to RKO by David O. Selznick.

== Selected filmography ==
Polglase was nominated for six Academy Awards for Best Art Direction:

- The Gay Divorcee (1934)
- Top Hat (1935)
- Carefree (1938)
- Love Affair (1939)
- My Favorite Wife (1940)
- Citizen Kane (1941)

== See also ==
- Art Directors Guild Hall of Fame
