= Let Yourself Go (Irving Berlin song) =

1936 popular song written by Irving Berlin

"Let Yourself Go" is a popular song written by Irving Berlin for the 1936 film Follow the Fleet, where it was introduced by Ginger Rogers.

== Background ==
Ginger Rogers performed the song in the 1936 musical Follow the Fleet backed up by Jeanne Gray, Betty Grable, and Joy Hodges. She reprised the song in an audition scene.

== Notable recordings ==
- Fred Astaire - recorded January 30, 1936 for Columbia Records (catalog No. 3116D).
- The Boswell Sisters (1936)
- Ella Fitzgerald – Ella Fitzgerald Sings the Irving Berlin Songbook (1958)
- Tony Bennett – Bennett/Berlin (1987)
- Stacey Kent – Let Yourself Go: Celebrating Fred Astaire (2000)
- Kristin Chenoweth – Let Yourself Go (2003)
- Crossroads - That Lucky Old Sun (2011)
