= I Used to Be Color Blind =

Song by Irving Berlin

"I Used to Be Color Blind" is a popular song written by Irving Berlin for the 1938 film Carefree, where it was introduced by Fred Astaire. The Astaire recording was very popular in 1938.

== Notable recordings ==
- Fred Astaire recorded the song again for his album The Astaire Story (1952)
- Anita O'Day - Pick Yourself Up with Anita O'Day (1957)
- Ella Fitzgerald - Ella Fitzgerald Sings the Irving Berlin Songbook (1958)
- Tony Bennett - Life Is Beautiful (1975)
