= I'm Putting All My Eggs in One Basket =

1936 popular song written by Irving Berlin

"I'm Putting All My Eggs in One Basket" is a popular song written by Irving Berlin for the 1936 film Follow the Fleet, where it was introduced by Fred Astaire and Ginger Rogers. Astaire had a huge hit with the song in 1936 and other popular versions that year were by Jan Garber (vocal by Fritz Heilbron) and by Guy Lombardo (vocal by Carmen Lombardo).

== Other notable recordings ==
- Boswell Sisters - recorded for Decca Records (catalog No.709A) on February 12, 1936.
- Louis Armstrong - recorded for Decca Records (catalog No.698A) on February 4, 1936.
- Zarah Leander - Swedish version titled "Du ä' så väldigt lik en ja' känner" (1936)
- Bing Crosby - recorded the song for his film Blue Skies in 1945 but it was cut from the film.
- Bob Wills and His Texas Playboys - in 1945 but not released until Tiffany Transcriptions Vol. 6 (1987)
- Fred Astaire - for his album The Astaire Story (1953)
- Carmen McRae - Blue Moon (1956)
- Ella Fitzgerald and Louis Armstrong - Ella and Louis Again (1957)
- Ella Fitzgerald - Ella Fitzgerald Sings the Irving Berlin Songbook (1958)
- Diane Schuur and B.B. King - Heart To Heart (1994)
- Stacey Kent - Let Yourself Go: Celebrating Fred Astaire (2000)
- Velody - "Faces" (2015)
