= The Continental (song) =

Song composed by Con Conrad

"The Continental" is a dance to a song written by Con Conrad with lyrics by Herb Magidson, and was introduced by Ginger Rogers and Fred Astaire in the 1934 film The Gay Divorcee. "The Continental" was the first song to win the Academy Award for Best Original Song. In the film it was sung by Ginger Rogers, Erik Rhodes and Lillian Miles.

== Other recordings ==
- Lud Gluskin, Jolly Coburn, and Leo Reisman had major hit records with The Continental at the time of introduction.
- Frank Sinatra recorded it, first in 1950, and again on his Sinatra Sings Days of Wine and Roses, Moon River, and Other Academy Award Winners in 1964.
- Harry James released a recording on the album Hollywood's Best (Columbia B-319 and CL-6224) with Rosemary Clooney on vocals in 1952.
- Blossom Dearie recorded a piano version in 1955. It appears on her first album Jazz-Sweet on the Barclay record label.
- Maureen McGovern recorded a version that reached number 16 on the UK Singles Chart in 1976.
- Steve Howe and Graham Preskett recorded it as a duet on The Steve Howe Album in 1979.
