= Pandro S. Berman =

American film producer

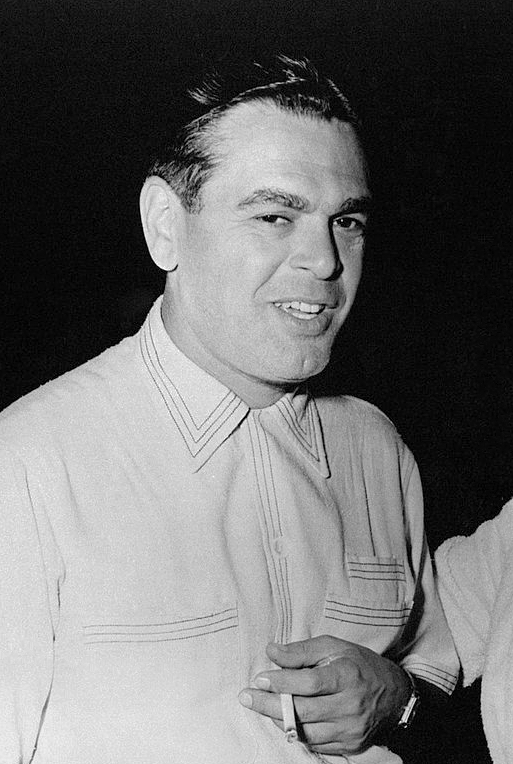
- Berman in 1953
- Born: Pandro Samuel Berman; March 28, 1905; Pittsburgh, Pennsylvania, U.S.
- Died: July 13, 1996 (aged 91); Beverly Hills, California, U.S.
- Resting place: Hillside Memorial Park; Culver City, California
- Years active: 1923–1970
- Spouses: Viola V. Newman (divorced); Kathryn Hereford (m. 1960; died 1993)
- Children: 3
- Relatives: Henry Berman (brother)

Pandro Samuel Berman (March 28, 1905 – July 13, 1996), also known as Pan Berman, was an American film producer.

== Early life ==
Berman was born to a Jewish family in Pittsburgh in 1905. His father Henry was general manager of Universal Pictures during Hollywood's formative years.

== Career ==
Berman was an assistant director during the 1920s under Mal St. Clair and Ralph Ince. In 1930, he was hired as a film editor at RKO Radio Pictures, then became an assistant producer. When RKO supervising producer Henry Hobart walked out during production of the ill-fated The Gay Diplomat (1931), Berman took over Hobart's responsibilities and remained in the post until 1939.

When David O. Selznick became chief of production at RKO in October 1931, Berman managed to survive Selznick's firing of most of the staff. Selznick named him producer for the adaptation of Fannie Hurst's short story Night Bell, a tale of a Jewish doctor's rise out of the Lower East Side ghetto to become a Park Avenue physician, which Selznick personally retitled Symphony of Six Million. He ordered Berman to have references to ethnic life in the Jewish ghetto restored. The movie was a box-office and critical success, and Selznick and Berman were proud of it. Berman later said it was the "first good movie" he produced.

The Fred Astaire/Ginger Rogers musicals were in production during the Berman regime, Katharine Hepburn rose to prominence, and such RKO classics as The Hunchback of Notre Dame and Gunga Din (both 1939) were completed.

Berman's brother Henry, a film editor, became his assistant at RKO.

=== MGM ===
Upset when an RKO power-play diminished his authority, Berman left for MGM in 1940, where he oversaw such productions as Ziegfeld Girl (1941), National Velvet (1944), The Bribe (1949), Father of the Bride (1950), Blackboard Jungle (1955) and BUtterfield 8 (1960). His brother Henry also moved to MGM to continue to work with him.

He had a partnership with the director Richard Thorpe in the 1950s, with whom he made several films, including Ivanhoe (1952), The Prisoner of Zenda (1952), Knights of the Round Table (1953), All the Brothers Were Valiant (1953) and The Adventures of Quentin Durward (1955).

In 1957 he and Lawrence Weingarten formed a company Avon Productions that released through MGM.

He survived several executive shake-ups at MGM and remained there until 1963, then went into independent production, closing out his career with the unsuccessful Move (1970).

== Awards ==
Berman was the winner of the 1976 Irving G. Thalberg Memorial Award. Six of his films were nominated for Academy Award for Best Picture: The Gay Divorcee (1934), Alice Adams and Top Hat (both 1935), Stage Door (1937), Father of the Bride (1950), and Ivanhoe (1952).

== Personal life and death ==
In 1937, Berman and his wife, Viola, hired architect Roland Coate to design a house for them in Beverly Hills, California. The sixteen-room, Cape Cod-inspired mansion cost $50,000 to build and included a screening room. Berman had three children with his first wife Viola - Susan Berman Moshay, Cynthia Berman Schaffel, and Michael Berman. His marriage to Viola ended in divorce. In 1960, Berman married Kathryn Hereford.

Berman died of congestive heart failure on July 13, 1996, in his Beverly Hills home, aged 91.

== Selected filmography ==
- Stocks and Blondes (1928)
- Phantom of the Range (1928)
- Fangs of the Wild (1928)
- The Texas Tornado (1928)
- Symphony of Six Million (1932)
- Morning Glory (1933)
- One Man's Journey (1933)
- The Little Minister (1934)
- The Gay Divorcee (1934)
- Where Sinners Meet (1934)
- Wednesday's Child (1934)
- Of Human Bondage (1934)
- Alice Adams (1935)
- Top Hat (1935)
- Roberta (1935)
- Swing Time (1936)
- Mary of Scotland (1936)
- Shall We Dance? (1937; uncredited)
- Stage Door (1937)
- The Hunchback of Notre Dame (1939)
- Ziegfeld Girl (1941)
- Rio Rita (1942)
- Dragon Seed (1944)
- National Velvet (1944)
- Song of Russia (1944; uncredited)
- The Picture of Dorian Gray (1945)
- If Winter Comes (1947)
- The Three Musketeers (1948)
- The Bribe (1949)
- Madame Bovary (1949)
- Father of the Bride (1950)
- Ivanhoe (1952)
- The Prisoner of Zenda (1952)
- Knights of the Round Table (1953)
- The Long, Long Trailer (1954)
- Blackboard Jungle (1955)
- Bhowani Junction (1956)
- Tea and Sympathy (1956)
- Jailhouse Rock (1957)
- The Brothers Karamazov (1958)
- The Reluctant Debutante (1958)
- BUtterfield 8 (1960)
- Sweet Bird of Youth (1962)
- A Patch of Blue (1965)
