= List of songs introduced by Fred Astaire =

This is a complete list of the songs introduced by Fred Astaire beginning with his first Broadway show Over the Top in 1917 (his childhood and teenage period in vaudeville is not covered). Those who co-introduced a song with him are indicated in the co-singer column. The year refers to the year of introduction, not necessarily the year the song was written. The "Date of First Commercial Recording" refers to songs for which Astaire's recording was the first release of the song to the record-buying public.

Title	Year	Co-singer(s)	Composer	Lyricist	Film	Stage musical	Date of first commercial recording
A Couple of Swells	1948	Judy Garland	Irving Berlin	Irving Berlin	Easter Parade		1948, MGM 30186 (soundtrack)
A Fine Romance	1936	Ginger Rogers	Jerome Kern	Dorothy Fields	Swing Time		Los Angeles, July 28, 1936, Brunswick 7716
A Foggy Day	1937		George Gershwin	Ira Gershwin	A Damsel in Distress		Los Angeles, October 17/19, 1937, Brunswick 7982
A Lot in Common with You	1942	Joan Leslie	Harold Arlen	Johnny Mercer	The Sky's the Limit		
A Needle in a Haystack	1934		Con Conrad	Herb Magidson	The Gay Divorcee		
All to Myself	1922	Adele Astaire	George Gershwin	Arthur Francis (pen name of Ira Gershwin)		For Goodness Sake	
After You, Who?	1932		Cole Porter	Cole Porter		Gay Divorce	1932, EC 1215
Anyway, We've Had Fun	1930	Marilyn Miller	Vincent Youmans	Ring Lardner		Smiles	
Baby Doll	1952		Harry Warren	Johnny Mercer	The Belle of New York		1952, MGM 30517 (soundtrack)
Be Good to Me	1930	Adele Astaire	Vincent Youmans	Ring Lardner		Smiles	
Bojangles of Harlem	1936		Jerome Kern	Dorothy Fields	Swing Time		Los Angeles, July 26, 1936, Brunswick 7718
Bring on the Girls	1917	Adele Astaire and others	Sigmund Romberg, Jean Schwartz	Harold R. Atteridge		The Passing Show of 1918	
Calypso Hooray	1957		Fred Astaire	Fred Astaire			1957, Verve 10051
Can't Stop Talking	1950	Betty Hutton	Frank Loesser	Frank Loesser	Let's Dance		
Change Partners	1938		Irving Berlin	Irving Berlin	Carefree		Los Angeles, March 24, 1938, Brunswick 8189
Cheek to Cheek	1935		Irving Berlin	Irving Berlin	Top Hat		New York, June 26, 1935, Brunswick 7486
City of the Angels	1975		Fred Astaire, Tommy Wolf	Tommy Wolf			London, July 22, 1975, UAS 19885/LA-580
Dearly Beloved	1942		Jerome Kern	Johnny Mercer	You Were Never Lovelier		1942, Decca 18491
Dig It	1940		Bernie Henighen	Johnny Mercer	Second Chorus		Los Angeles, September 22, 1940, Columbia 35852
Dream Dancing	1941		Cole Porter	Cole Porter	You Were Never Lovelier (instrumental only)		1941, Decca 18188
Dreaming	1921	Adele Astaire	Victor Jacobi	Edward Royce		The Love Letter	
Drum Crazy	1948		Irving Berlin	Irving Berlin	Easter Parade		
Ev'ry Night at Seven	1951		Burton Lane	Alan Jay Lerner	Royal Wedding		1951, MGM 30319 (soundtrack)
Every Day in Every Way	1922	Adele Astaire	Jerome Kern	Anne Caldwell		The Bunch and Judy	
Fascinating Rhythm	1924	Adele Astaire, Walter Catlett	George Gershwin	Ira Gershwin		Lady Be Good	London, April 19, 1926, EC 3969
Fated to Be Mated	1957		Cole Porter	Cole Porter	Silk Stockings		
Flying Down to Rio	1933		Vincent Youmans	Edward Eliscu, Gus Kahn	Flying Down to Rio		December 12, 1933, Columbia 2912D
French Pastry Walk	1922	Charles Judels, Vinton Freedley	William Daly Jr. and Paul Lannin	Arthur Jackson]] and Arthur Francis (pen name of Ira Gershwin)		For Goodness Sake	
Funny Face	1927	Adele Astaire	George Gershwin	Ira Gershwin		Funny Face	London, November 26, 1928, EC 5174
Hang on to Me	1924	Adele Astaire	George Gershwin	Ira Gershwin		Lady Be Good	London, April 19, 1926, EC 3970
Happy Easter	1948		Irving Berlin	Irving Berlin	Easter Parade		
Hello, Baby	1956		Fred Astaire	Moe Jaffe, Walter Ruick			Los Angeles, March 30, 1956, Verve 2009
Here's to the Girls (1944)	1946		Roger Edens	Arthur Freed	Ziegfeld Follies		
High Hat	1927		George Gershwin	Ira Gershwin		Funny Face	London, December 4, 1928, EC 5173
History of the Beat	1955		Johnny Mercer	Johnny Mercer	Daddy Long Legs		
Hoe Down the Bayou/Poor Mr. Chisholm	1940		Bernie Henighen	Johnny Mercer	Second Chorus		Los Angeles, September 22, 1940, Columbia 35852
Hoops	1931	Adele Astaire	Arthur Schwartz	Howard Dietz		The Band Wagon	New York, October 5, 1931, Victor 22836
How Could You Believe Me	1951	Jane Powell	Burton Lane	Alan Jay Lerner	Royal Wedding		1951, MGM 30316 (soundtrack)
How Do You Do, Katinka?	1922	Adele Astaire	Jerome Kern	Anne Caldwell		The Bunch and Judy	
I Can't Be Bothered Now	1937		George Gershwin	Ira Gershwin	A Damsel in Distress		Los Angeles, October 17/19, 1937, Brunswick 7982
I Can't Tell a Lie	1941		Irving Berlin	Irving Berlin	Holiday Inn		Los Angeles, May 27, 1942, Decca 18428
I Left My Hat in Haiti	1951		Burton Lane	Alan Jay Lerner	Royal Wedding		1951, MGM 30317 (soundtrack)
I Love Everybody But You (1962)	1975		Fred Astaire	Fred and Ava Astaire			London, July 30, 1975, UAS 19885/LA-580
I Love Louisa	1931	Adele Astaire	Arthur Schwartz	Howard Dietz		The Band Wagon	New York, October 5, 1931, Victor 22755
I Used to Be Color Blind	1938		Irving Berlin	Irving Berlin	Carefree		Los Angeles, March 24, 1938, Brunswick 8189
I Wanna Be a Dancin' Man	1952		Harry Warren	Johnny Mercer	The Belle of New York		1952, MGM 30520 (soundtrack)
I'd Rather Charleston	1924		George Gershwin	Desmond Carter		Lady Be Good	London, April 19, 1926, EC 3970
I'd Rather Lead a Band	1936		Irving Berlin	Irving Berlin	Follow the Fleet		Los Angeles, January 30, 1936, Brunswick 7610
I'll Capture Your Heart Singing	1941	Bing Crosby	Irving Berlin	Irving Berlin	Holiday Inn		Los Angeles, May 27, 1942, Decca 18427
I'll Say I Love You	1921	Adele Astaire	Victor Jacobi	Edward Royce		The Love Letter	
I'm Building Up to an Awful Let-Down	1936		Fred Astaire	Johnny Mercer			Los Angeles, January 30, 1936, Brunswick 7610
I'm Glad I Waited	1930	Marilyn Miller	Vincent Youmans	Clifford Grey, Harold Adamson		Smiles	
I'm Putting All My Eggs in One Basket	1936	Ginger Rogers	Irving Berlin	Irving Berlin	Follow the Fleet		Los Angeles, January 30, 1936, Brunswick 7609
I've Got Beginner's Luck	1937		George Gershwin	Ira Gershwin	Shall We Dance		Los Angeles, March 19, 1937, Brunswick 7855
I've Got My Eyes on You	1940		Cole Porter	Cole Porter	Broadway Melody of 1940		
I've Got You on My Mind	1932	Claire Luce	Cole Porter	Cole Porter		Gay Divorce	New York, November 11, 1932, Victor 24193, 24716
If I Were You, Love	1930	Adele Astaire	Vincent Youmans	Ring Larnder		Smiles	
If Swing Goes, I Go Too	1944		Fred Astaire	Fred Astaire	Ziegfeld Follies deleted number		1944, Decca 23388
Isn't This a Lovely Day?	1935		Irving Berlin	Irving Berlin	Top Hat		New York, June 27, 1935, Brunswick 7487
It Only Happens When I Dance with You	1948		Irving Berlin	Irving Berlin	Easter Parade		1948, MGM 3018 (soundtrack)
Jack and the Beanstalk	1950		Frank Loesser	Frank Loesser	Let's Dance		
Just like Taking Candy from a Baby	1940		Fred Astaire	Gladys Shelly			Los Angeles, May 9, 1940, Columbia 35517
Let's Call the Whole Thing Off	1937	Ginger Rogers	George Gershwin	Ira Gershwin	Shall We Dance		Los Angeles, March 19, 1937, Brunswick 7857
Let's Face the Music and Dance	1936		Irving Berlin	Irving Berlin	Follow the Fleet		Los Angeles, January 30, 1936, Brunswick 7608
Let's Kiss and Make Up	1927	Adele Astaire	George Gershwin	Ira Gershwin		Funny Face	
Life Is Beautiful	1975		Fred Astaire, Tommy Wolf	Tommy Wolf			London, July 22, 1975, UAS 19885/LA-580
Love of My Life	1940		Artie Shaw	Johnny Mercer	Second Chorus		Los Angeles, September 22, 1940, Columbia 35815
Manhattan Downbeat	1949		Harry Warren	Ira Gershwin	The Barkleys of Broadway		
Me and the Ghost Upstairs	1940		Bernie Henighen	Johnny Mercer	Second Chorus deleted number		Los Angeles, September 22, 1940, Columbia 35815
My One and Only	1927	Betty Compton, Gertrude McDonald	George Gershwin	Ira Gershwin		Funny Face	London, December 4, 1928, EC 5173
My One and Only Highland Fling	1949	Ginger Rogers	Harry Warren	Ira Gershwin	The Barkleys of Broadway		1949, MGM 50016 (soundtrack)
Never Gonna Dance	1936		Jerome Kern	Dorothy Fields	Swing Time		Los Angeles, July 26, 1936, Brunswick 7718
New Sun in the Sky	1931	Adele Astaire	Arthur Schwartz	Howard Dietz		The Band Wagon	New York, October 5, 1931, Victor 22755
Nice Work If You Can Get It	1937	Betty Rone, Jan Duggan, Mary Dean (dubbed by The Stafford Sisters)	George Gershwin	Ira Gershwin	A Damsel in Distress		Los Angeles, October 17/19, 1937, Brunswick 7983
Night and Day	1932		Cole Porter	Cole Porter		Gay Divorce	New York, November 11, 1932, Victor 24193, 24716
No Strings (I'm Fancy Free)	1935		Irving Berlin	Irving Berlin	Top Hat		New York, June 26, 1935, Brunswick 7486
Not My Girl	1929		Fred Astaire, Van Phillips	Desmond Carter			London, April 5, 1929, EC 5174
Oh Gee, Oh Gosh	1922	Adele Astaire	William Daly	Arthur Jackson (Note: While these lyrics have been misattributed (see Norton 2002, p. 279) to Arthur Francis, the pen name Ira Gershwin used through 1923 (Ira contributed other lyrics to For Goodness Sake), the published sheet music clarifies it is Jackson's lyric.)		For Goodness Sake	London, October 18, 1923, His Master's Voice B1719
Oh My Achin' Back	1945		Fred Astaire	Wille Shore, Morey Amsterdam			1945, Decca unreleased, released 1982, MCA MCL 1706
Oh Them Dudes	1950	Betty Hutton	Frank Loesser	Frank Loesser	Let's Dance		
On the Beam	1942		Jerome Kern	Johnny Mercer	absent from release of You Were Never Lovelier		1942, Decca 18489B _B side to You Were Never Lovelier Decca 18489A
One for My Baby	1943		Harold Arlen	Johnny Mercer	The Sky's the Limit		1945, Decca unreleased
Oops	1952		Harry Warren	Johnny Mercer	The Belle of New York		1952, MGM 30518 (soundtrack)
Pale Venetian Moon	1922	Adele Astaire	Jerome Kern	Anne Caldwell		The Bunch and Judy	
Peach Girl	1922	Adele Astaire	Jerome Kern	Anne Caldwell		The Bunch and Judy	
Pick Yourself Up	1936	Ginger Rogers	Jerome Kern	Dorothy Fields	Swing Time		Los Angeles, July 26, 1936, Brunswick 7717
Please Don't Monkey with Broadway	1940	George Murphy	Cole Porter	Cole Porter	Broadway Melody of 1940		
Quick Service	1917	Adele Astaire	Sigmund Romberg, Jean Schwartz	Harold R. Atteridge		The Passing Show of 1918	
Say, Young Man of Manhattan	1930		Vincent Youmans	Clifford Grey, Harold Adamson		Smiles	
Seeing's Believing	1952		Harry Warren	Johnny Mercer	The Belle of New York		1952, MGM 30518 (soundtrack)
Shall We Dance	1937		George Gershwin	Ira Gershwin	Shall We Dance		Los Angeles, March 21, 1937, Brunswick 7857
Shoes with Wings on	1949		Harry Warren	Ira Gershwin	The Barkleys of Broadway		1949, MGM 50017 (soundtrack)
Slap That Bass	1937	Dudley Dickerson	George Gershwin	Ira Gershwin	Shall We Dance		Los Angeles, March 18, 1937, Brunswick 7856
So Near and yet So Far	1941		Cole Porter	Cole Porter	You'll Never Get Rich		1941, Decca 18187
Something's Gotta Give	1955		Johnny Mercer	Johnny Mercer	Daddy Long Legs		1955, RCA Victor 20-6140
Squab Farm	1917		Sigmund Romberg, Jean Schwartz	Harold R. Atteridge		The Passing Show of 1918	
Steppin' Out with My Baby	1948		Irving Berlin	Irving Berlin	Easter Parade		1948, MGM 30188 (soundtrack)
Sweet Music	1931	Adele Astaire	Arthur Schwartz	Howard Dietz		The Band Wagon	
Sweet Sorrow (1940)	1956		Fred Astaire	Gladys Shelley			Los Angeles, March 30, 1956, Verve 2019
Swiss Miss	1924		George Gershwin	Ira Gershwin, Arthur Jackson		Lady Be Good	London, April 27, 1926, EC 3979
That Face	1957		Lew Spence	Alan and Marilyn Bergman	Another Evening with Fred Astaire (1959)		1957, Verve 10051
That's Entertainment!	1953	Jack Buchanan, Nanette Fabray, Oscar Levant	Arthur Schwartz	Howard Dietz	The Band Wagon		1953, MGM 30793 (soundtrack)
The Afterbeat	1959		Fred Astaire	Johnny Mercer	Another Evening with Fred Astaire		1959, Kapp 311
The Babbit and the Bromide	1927	Adele Astaire	George Gershwin	Ira Gershwin		Funny Face	London, November 26, 1928, EC 5174
The Half of It, Dearie' Blues	1924	Kathleen Martyn	George Gershwin	Ira Gershwin		Lady Be Good	London, April 19, 1926, EC 3969
The Jolly Tar and the Milkmaid	1937	Pearl Amatore, Betty Rone, Jac George	George Gershwin	Ira Gershwin	A Damsel in Distress		
The Justine Johnson Rag	1917	Adele Astaire and others	Sigmund Romberg, Herman Timberg, Frank Carter	Charles Manning		Over the Top	
The Ritz, Roll and Rock	1957		Cole Porter	Cole Porter	Silk Stockings		
The Shorty George	1942	Rita Hayworth dubbed by Nan Wynn	Jerome Kern	Johnny Mercer	You Were Never Lovelier		1942, Decca 18491
The Sluefoot	1955		Johnny Mercer	Johnny Mercer	Daddy Long Legs		1955, RCA Victor 20-6140
The Way You Look Tonight	1936		Jerome Kern	Dorothy Fields	Swing Time		Los Angeles, July 26, 1936, Brunswick 7717
The Whichness of the Whatness	1922	Adele Astaire	William Daly Jr. and Paul Lannin	Arthur Jackson		For Goodness Sake	London, October 18, 1923, His Master's Voice B1719
There's No Time like the Present	1956		Fred Astaire	Walter Ruick			Los Angeles, March 30, 1956, Verve 2009
They Can't Take That Away from Me	1937		George Gershwin	Ira Gershwin	Shall We Dance		Los Angeles, March 19, 1937, Brunswick 7855
Things Are Looking Up	1937		George Gershwin	Ira Gershwin	A Damsel in Distress		Los Angeles, October 17/19, 1937, Brunswick 7983
This Heart of Mine	1946		Harry Warren	Arthur Freed	Ziegfeld Follies		1944, Decca 23388
Times Square	1922	Adele Astaire and others	Jerome Kern	Anne Caldwell		The Bunch and Judy	
Top Hat, White Tie and Tails	1935		Irving Berlin	Irving Berlin	Top Hat		New York, June 26, 1935, Brunswick 7486
Tunnel of Love	1950	Betty Hutton	Frank Loesser	Frank Loesser	Let's Dance		
Twit, Twit, Twit	1918	Adele Astaire	Sigmund Romberg, Jean Schwartz	Harold R. Atteridge		The Passing Show of 1918	
Upside Down	1921	Adele Astaire	Victor Jacobi	Edward Royce		The Love Letter	
We Saw the Sea	1936		Irving Berlin	Irving Berlin	Follow the Fleet		Los Angeles, January 30, 1936, Brunswick 7609
When You're in Rome	1922		George Gershwin	Arthur Francis aka Ira Gershwin		For Goodness Sake	
Where is the Language to Tell?	1917	Adele Astaire	Sigmund Romberg, Herman Timberg	Phillip Bartholomae, Harold R. Atteridge		Over the Top	
White Heat	1931	Adele Astaire	Arthur Schwartz	Howard Dietz		The Band Wagon	New York, September 28, 1931, Victor 22836
Who Wants to Kiss the Bridegroom? (Bachelor Dinner Song)	1952		Harry Warren	Johnny Mercer	The Belle of New York		1952, MGM 30520 (soundtrack)
Yolanda	1946		Harry Warren	Arthur Freed	Yolanda and the Thief		
You Were Never Lovelier	1942		Jerome Kern	Johnny Mercer	You Were Never Lovelier		1942, Decca 18489A
You Worry Me	1962		Fred Astaire	Fred Astaire			Los Angeles, Nov 15, 1962, Ava 125
You'd Be Hard to Replace	1949		Harry Warren	Ira Gershwin	The Barkleys of Broadway		1949, MGM 50016 (soundtrack)
You're All the World to Me	1951		Burton Lane	Alan Jay Lerner	Royal Wedding		1951, MGM 30317 (soundtrack)
You're Easy to Dance with	1941		Irving Berlin	Irving Berlin	Holiday Inn		Los Angeles, May 27, 1942, Decca 18428
You're in Love	1932	Claire Luce, Erik Rhodes	Cole Porter	Cole Porter		Gay Divorce	

== Sources ==
Norton, Richard C. (2002). A Chronology of American Musical Theater. Vol. 2. Oxford University Press.
