= Fred Astaire's solo and partnered dances =

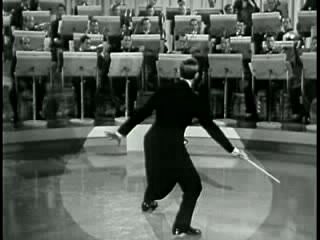
Fred Astaire dance-conducting the Artie Shaw Orchestra in Second Chorus

This is a comprehensive guide to over one hundred and fifty of Fred Astaire's solo and partnered dances compiled from his thirty-one Hollywood musical comedy films produced between 1933 and 1968, his four television specials and his television appearances on The Hollywood Palace and Bob Hope Presents the Chrysler Theatre which cover the period from 1958 to 1968. Further information on the dance routines may be obtained, where available, by clicking on the film links.

While Fred Astaire remains the most prolific and influential dancer in cinema history, his corpus is also valued for its inventiveness, virtuosity and precision of execution, indeed a hallmark of Astaire was his determination never to repeat himself.

Roberta (1935) was the last film where the taps were all recorded live; after this, virtually all of Fred Astaire's taps were re-recorded by him in post production. While this was common practice in Hollywood musicals of the time - for example, Ginger Rogers' taps on the Astaire-Rogers pictures were post-recorded by Astaire's collaborator Hermes Pan - it was unusual for a major star to undertake such a tedious and time-consuming task. It was the act of a perfectionist who was by no means a workaholic - between films he would seldom dance, devoting himself instead to his family and favorite pastimes of horseracing and golf.

== The controversy over the use of film clips of Astaire's dances ==
Clips showing Astaire's filmed dances are rarely shown in public today, although they have featured in films such as The Green Mile and, more controversially, in 1997 Dirt Devil commercials. Astaire always retained the sole rights to his dances and after his death, these rights - which are essentially rights of publicity - passed to his widow Robyn Smith Astaire - who charges a fee schedule for the airing of these clips that some program producers consider uneconomic. Mrs. Astaire has contended that the license fees are moderate and are used to help fund litigation to defend against copyright infringement of her late husband's estate.

In recent years, following the issuance of most of Astaire's films on DVD and the advent of sites such as YouTube which feature many of his most famous dance clips, the public is becoming increasingly exposed to his work.

== Solo dances ==
The solo dances are classified according to genre. An asterisk (*) after the entry indicates the backing presence of chorus dancers for at least part of the routine. A (w/ song) after the entry indicates that Astaire sings the song as an introduction or accompaniment to the dance. For the purposes of this classification a tap solo is defined as a routine where a substantial part of the routine is taken up with tap steps.

=== Tap solos without props ===
- "Music Makes Me" from Flying Down to Rio (1933).
- "Don't Let It Bother You" from The Gay Divorcee (1934).
- "It's Just Like Looking For A Needle In A Haystack" from The Gay Divorcee. (w/ song)
- "I Won't Dance" from Roberta (1935). (w/ song)
- "No Strings (Part 1)" from Top Hat (1935). (w/ song)
- "I'd Rather Lead A Band" from Follow the Fleet (1936). (*) (w/song)
- "Slap That Bass" from Shall We Dance (1937). (w/ song)
- "Boogie Barcarolle" from You'll Never Get Rich (1941). (*)
- "Since I Kissed My Baby Goodbye" from You'll Never Get Rich.
- "March Milastaire (A-Stairable Rag)" from You'll Never Get Rich.
- "One for My Baby (and One More for the Road)" from The Sky's the Limit (1943). (w/ song)
- "Heat Wave (part of)" from Blue Skies (1946). (*)

=== Solo sand dances ===
- "No Strings (reprise)" from Top Hat (1935).
- "I Wanna Be A Dancin' Man" from The Belle of New York (1952). (w/ song)

=== Solos with cane ===
- "Top Hat, White Tie and Tails" from Top Hat (1935). (*) (tap solo) (w/ song)
- "I Can't Be Bothered Now" (w/ furled umbrella) from A Damsel in Distress (1937). (tap solo) (w/ song)
- "Audition Dance" from You Were Never Lovelier (1942). (tap solo)
- "Test Solo" from Three Little Words (1950). (tap solo)
- "Let's Kiss and Make Up" (w/ furled umbrella and raincoat as cape) from Funny Face (1957). (w/ song)
- "The Ritz, Roll and Rock" from Silk Stockings (1957). (*) (w/ song)
- "Opening Solo" from An Evening with Fred Astaire (1958).

see also "Puttin' on the Ritz" and "Steppin' Out with My Baby" below.

=== Solos with drums ===
- "Nice Work If You Can Get It" from A Damsel in Distress (1937). (tap solo) (w/ song)
- "Drum Crazy" from Easter Parade (1948). (w/ song)
- "The History of the Beat" from Daddy Long Legs (1955). (w/ song)
- "Drum Solo Dance" from Another Evening with Fred Astaire (1959).

=== Solos using special photographic effects ===
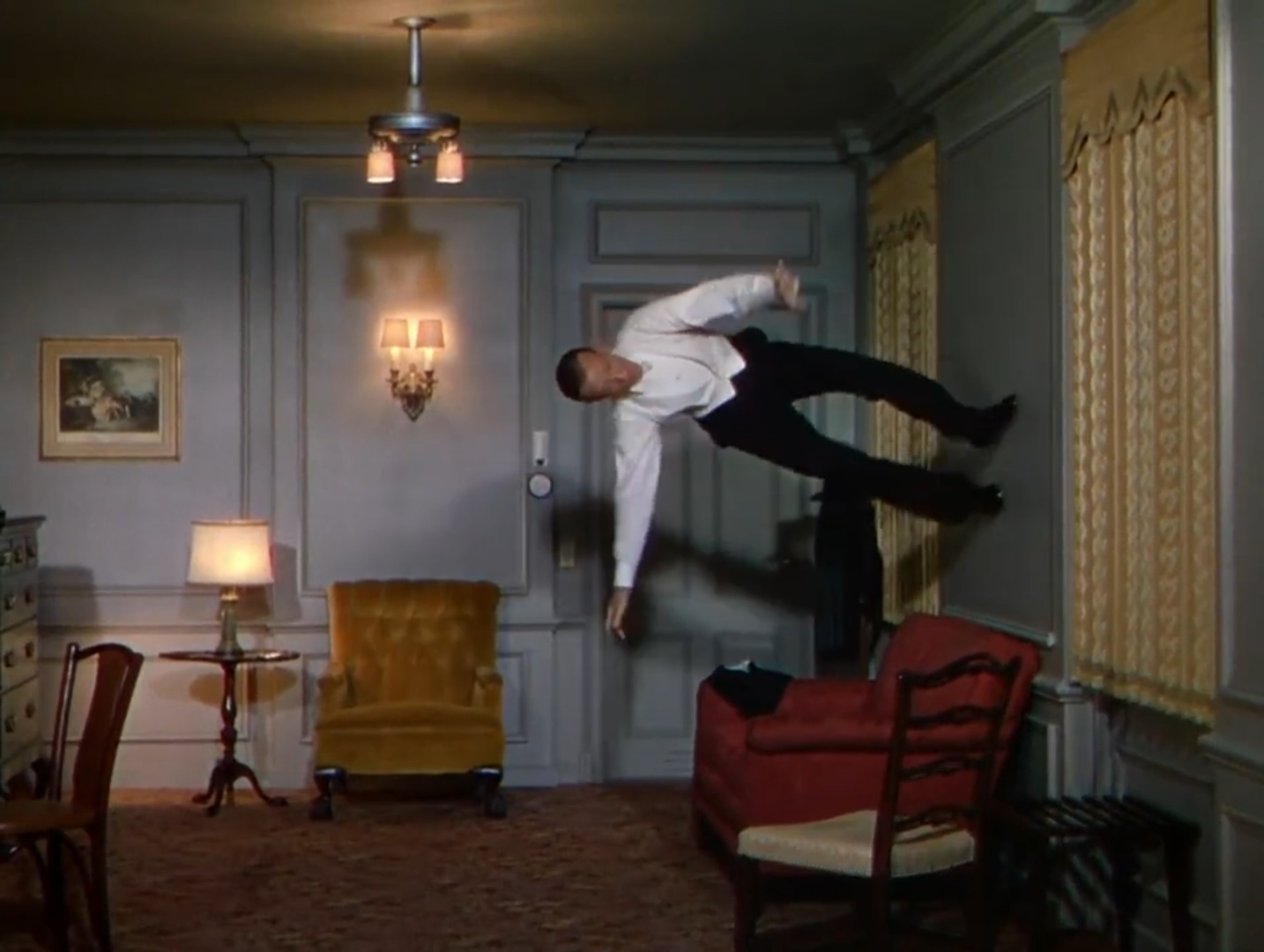
Fred Astaire in "You're All the World to Me"

- "Bojangles of Harlem" from Swing Time (1936). (*) (tap solo)
- "Let's Say It with Firecrackers" from Holiday Inn (1942). (tap solo with fireworks)
- "Puttin' on the Ritz" from Blue Skies (1946). (tap solo with cane) (w/ song)
- "Steppin' Out with My Baby" (part) from Easter Parade (1948). (*) (solo with cane) (w/ song)
- "Shoes with Wings On" from The Barkleys of Broadway (1949). (tap solo) (w/ song)
- "You're All the World to Me" from Royal Wedding (1951). (w/ song)
- "Seeing's Believing" from The Belle of New York (1952). (w/ song)

=== Other solos ===
- "A Foggy Day in London Town" from A Damsel in Distress (1937). (w/ song)
- "Since They Turned Loch Lomond into Swing" from Carefree (1938).
- "Hello, Hello Who's Your Lady Friend" from The Story of Vernon and Irene Castle (1939). (*) (w/ song)
- "By the Light of the Silvery Moon" from The Story of Vernon and Irene Castle (1939).
- "Sunday Jumps" from Royal Wedding (1951).
- "Like Fast/The Afterbeat" (w/song) and "Night Train" (*) from Another Evening with Fred Astaire (1959).
- "Top Hat" and "The Cat" from The Hollywood Palace, Episode 60, (1965).
- "Bugle Call Rag" from The Hollywood Palace, Episode 81, (1966).
- "When The Idle Poor Become The Idle Rich" from Finian's Rainbow (1968). (w/ song)
- 42nd Academy Awards (1970)

== Partnered dances ==
Dance routines are grouped by dance partner who, in turn, are listed alphabetically. Astaire also created dances where he danced with two or three partners (or a sequence of partners) and these are grouped separately and listed chronologically.

For many years, Fred Astaire was plagued by interviewers who wished to know who his favorite dance partner was. Ever the gentleman, Astaire would often cheekily reply with "Bing Crosby". The closest he may have come to identifying a possible favorite was in Interview magazine in June 1973 where he said: "Barrie Chase is the best partner - she's the latest partner that I've had, and believe me, that girl has got it - that girl can dance."

=== Duets (primarily with one dance partner) ===
- Jack Buchanan in "I Guess I'll Have to Change My Plan" from The Band Wagon (1953).
- Lucille Bremer in
  - "This Heart of Mine" and "Limehouse Blues" from Ziegfeld Follies (1944, 1946).
  - "Dream Ballet" and "Coffee Time" from Yolanda and the Thief (1945).
- Leslie Caron in "Daydream Sequence (3rd section)", "The Sluefoot" and "Something's Gotta Give" from Daddy Long Legs (1955).
- Cyd Charisse in
  - "Dancing in the Dark" and "Girl Hunt Ballet" from The Band Wagon (1953).
  - "It's A Chemical Reaction That's All"/"All of You" and "Fated to Be Mated" from Silk Stockings (1957).
- Barrie Chase in
  - "Change Partners" and "St. James Infirmary" from An Evening with Fred Astaire (1958).
  - "That Face", "My Baby"/"Word Jazz" and "Sophisticated Lady" from Another Evening with Fred Astaire (1959).
  - "Miss Otis Regrets", "The Blues" and "Anitra's Shuffle" from Astaire Time (1960).
  - "The Shake" from Bob Hope Presents the Chrysler Theatre, Episode 30: Think Pretty, (1964).
  - "Re-animated mannequin dance" from The Hollywood Palace, Episode 74, (1966).
  - "See-See Rider" and "Boom-Boom" from The Hollywood Palace, Episode 88, (1966).
  - "Oh, You Beautiful Doll", "The Look of Love", "Limehouse Blues", and "Chinatown, My Chinatown" from The Fred Astaire Show (1968).
- Petula Clark in "Look to the Rainbow" from Finian's Rainbow (1968).
- Joan Crawford in "Heigh Ho The Gang's All Here"/"Let's Go Bavarian" from Dancing Lady (1933).
- Bing Crosby in
  - "I'll Capture Your Heart" from Holiday Inn (1942).
  - "A Couple of Song and Dance Men" from Blue Skies (1946).
- Virginia Dale in "You're Easy to Dance With" from Holiday Inn (1942).
- LeRoy Daniels in "A Shine on My Shoes" from The Band Wagon (1953).
- Joan Fontaine in "Things Are Looking Up" from A Damsel in Distress (1937).

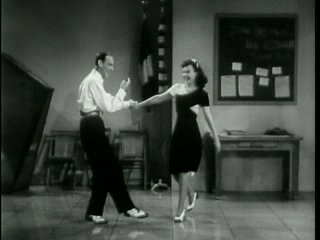
Astaire and Goddard in "I Ain't Hep To That Step But I'll Dig It"

- Judy Garland in "Beautiful Faces", "Rehearsal/Performance/Audition Medley", "A Couple of Swells" and "Easter Parade" from Easter Parade (1948).
- Paulette Goddard in "I Ain't Hep to That Step but I'll Dig It" from Second Chorus (1941).
- Rita Hayworth in
  - "Boogie Barcarolle (rehearsal sequence)", "So Near and Yet So Far", and "The Wedding Cakewalk" from You'll Never Get Rich (1941).
  - "I'm Old Fashioned", "The Shorty George" and "You Were Never Lovelier" from You Were Never Lovelier (1942).
- Audrey Hepburn in "Funny Face", "He Loves and She Loves" and "'S Wonderful" from Funny Face (1957).
- Harriet Hoctor in "They Can't Take That Away from Me" from Shall We Dance (1937).
- Betty Hutton in "Can't Stop Talking", "Oh Them Dudes", "Why Fight the Feeling" and "Tunnel of Love" from Let's Dance (1950).
- Gene Kelly in
  - "The Babbitt and the Bromide" from Ziegfeld Follies (1944/1946).
  - "That's Entertainment!" from That's Entertainment, Part II (1976).
- Joan Leslie in "A Lot in Common with You" and "My Shining Hour" from The Sky's the Limit (1943).
- Ann Miller in "It Only Happens When I Dance with You" from Easter Parade (1948).
- George Murphy in "Please Don't Monkey with Broadway" from Broadway Melody of 1940 (1940).
- Janis Paige in "Stereophonic Sound" from Silk Stockings (1957).
- Hermes Pan in "Me and the Ghost Upstairs" from Second Chorus (1941). (deleted number)
- Eleanor Powell in "Jukebox Dance (Italian Cafe Routine)", "I Concentrate on You" and "Begin the Beguine" from Broadway Melody of 1940.
- Jane Powell in "Every Night at Seven", "Open Your Eyes", "How Could You Believe Me When I Said I Love You When You Know I've Been a Liar All My Life" and "I Left My Hat In Haiti" from Royal Wedding (1951).
- Marjorie Reynolds in "You're Easy to Dance With (Drunk Dance)" and "Be Careful, It's My Heart" from Holiday Inn (1942).
- Ginger Rogers in
  - "The Carioca" from Flying Down to Rio (1933).
  - "Night and Day", "The Continental" and "Table Dance (The Continental)" from The Gay Divorcee (1934).
  - "I'll Be Hard to Handle", "Smoke Gets in Your Eyes" and "I Won't Dance (Reprise)" from Roberta (1935).
  - "Isn't This a Lovely Day (To Be Caught in the Rain)", "Cheek to Cheek" and "The Piccolino" from Top Hat (1935).
  - "Let Yourself Go", "I'm Putting all My Eggs in One Basket" and "Let's Face the Music and Dance" from Follow the Fleet (1936).
  - "Pick Yourself Up", "Waltz in Swing Time" and "Never Gonna Dance" from Swing Time (1936).
  - "Walking the Dog", "They All Laughed (At Christopher Columbus)", "Let's Call the Whole Thing Off" and "Shall We Dance" from Shall We Dance (1937).
  - "I Used to Be Color Blind", "The Yam" and "Change Partners" from Carefree (1938).
  - "Waiting For The Robert E. Lee", "Too Much Mustard", "Medley Montage" and "The Last Waltz" from The Story of Vernon and Irene Castle (1939).
  - "Swing Trot", "You'd Be Hard to Replace", "Bouncin' the Blues", "My One and Only Highland Fling", "They Can't Take That Away from Me" and "Manhattan Downbeat" from The Barkleys of Broadway (1949).
- Olga San Juan in "Heat Wave" from Blue Skies (1946).
- Kay Thompson in "Clap Yo' Hands" from Funny Face (1957).
- Vera-Ellen in
  - "Where Did You Get That Girl?", "Mr. and Mrs. Hoofer At Home", "Nevertheless" and "Thinking of You" from Three Little Words (1950).
  - "Baby Doll", "Oops" and "A Bride's Wedding Day Song (Currier and Ives)" from The Belle of New York (1952).

=== Dances with two or more partners ===
- "Put Me to the Test" and "Keep A Stiff Upper Lip" (w/ George Burns and Gracie Allen) from A Damsel in Distress (1937).
- "I've Got My Eyes on You" reprise (w/ Eleanor Powell and George Murphy from Broadway Melody of 1940 (1940 film).
- "Shootin' the Works for Uncle Sam" from You'll Never Get Rich (1941).
- "A Pretty Girl Is Like a Melody" from Blue Skies (1946).
- "Steppin' Out with My Baby" (w/ Patricia Jackson, Bobbie Priest and Dee Turnell) from Easter Parade (1948).
- "Who Wants to Kiss the Bridegroom" from The Belle of New York (1952).
- "That's Entertainment!" (w/ Jack Buchanan, Nanette Fabray and Oscar Levant) from The Band Wagon (1953).
- "Triplets" (w/ Jack Buchanan and Nanette Fabray) from The Band Wagon (1953).
- "Daydream Sequence (2nd Section)" from Daddy Long Legs (1955).
- "Too Bad" (w/ Peter Lorre, Jules Munshin, Barrie Chase et al.) from Silk Stockings (1957).
- "Man with the Blues" from An Evening with Fred Astaire (1958).

== Choreographic collaborators ==
Although Astaire was the primary choreographer of all his dance routines, he welcomed the input of collaborators. This is particularly true in the case of his principal collaborator, Hermes Pan, where the seamless nature of the collaboration has been described by Astaire's rehearsal pianist Hal Borne, the only independent witness present throughout the entire process of dance creation of the Astaire-Rogers films: "It was hard to figure who contributed what to the choreography". Borne also describes the working atmosphere of such collaborations: "It was always pleasant. Never a hint of unpleasantness."

Given the consistency of Astaire's dance style in subsequent films made with or without the assistance of Pan, and the fact that he choreographed all the routines during his Broadway career with his sister Adele, dance historian John Mueller is of the opinion that Astaire acted as lead choreographer in his solos and partnered dances throughout his career. Later in his career he became a little more amenable to accepting the direction of his collaborators, however this was almost always confined to the area of extended fantasy sequences, or "dream ballets".

Occasionally Astaire took joint screen credit for choreography or "dance direction" as it was known in the 1930s and 1940s but, as was the custom in musical films of the period, he generally left the screen credit to his collaborator. This can lead to the completely misleading impression that Astaire merely performed the choreography of others. Later in life he admitted: "I had to do most of it myself."

- Robert Alton in You'll Never Get Rich (1941), Ziegfeld Follies (1944/1946), Easter Parade (1948), The Barkleys of Broadway (1949), and The Belle of New York (1952).
- Nick Castle in Royal Wedding (1951).
- Bobby Connolly in Broadway Melody of 1940 (1940).
- Danny Dare in Holiday Inn (1942).
- Dave Gould in Flying Down to Rio (1933) and The Gay Divorcee (1934).
- Michael Kidd in The Band Wagon (1953).
- Sammy Lee in Dancing Lady (1933).
- Eugene Loring in Ziegfeld Follies (1944/1946), Yolanda and the Thief (1945), Funny Face (1957) and the numbers not involving Astaire in Silk Stockings (1957).

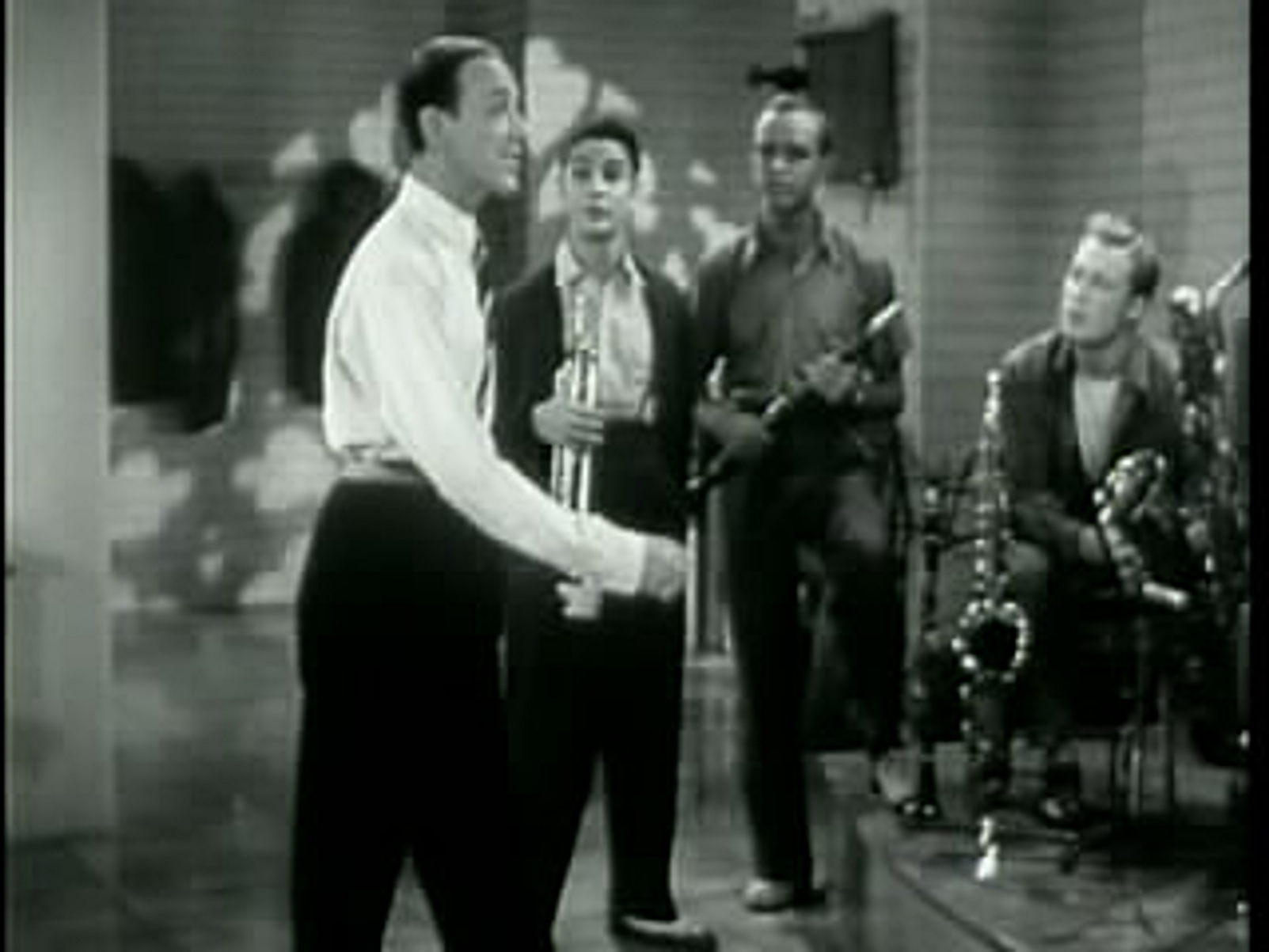
Astaire and Pan (standing third from left) in Second Chorus (1940)

- Hermes Pan in Flying Down to Rio (1933) (as assistant to Dave Gould), The Gay Divorcee (1934) (as assistant to Dave Gould), Roberta (1935), Top Hat (1935), Follow the Fleet (1936), Swing Time (1936), Shall We Dance (1937), A Damsel in Distress (1937), Carefree (1938), The Story of Vernon and Irene Castle (1939), Second Chorus (1941), Blue Skies (1946), the "Shoes With Wings On" number from The Barkleys of Broadway (1949), Three Little Words (1950), Let's Dance (1950), all numbers involving Astaire in Silk Stockings (1957), An Evening with Fred Astaire (1958), Another Evening with Fred Astaire (1959), Astaire Time (1960), Bob Hope Presents the Chrysler Theatre, Episode 30: "Think Pretty" (1964), The Hollywood Palace Episodes 60 (1965), 74, 88 (1966) and Finian's Rainbow (1968).
- Val Raset in You Were Never Lovelier (1942).
- Dave Robel in the "Puttin' On The Ritz" number in Blue Skies (1946), and Daddy Long Legs (1955).
- Herbert Ross in The Fred Astaire Show (1968).
