= Top Hat (musical) =

2011 musical written by Irving Berlin

- Advertising poster for the original West End cast at the Aldwych Theatre, London
- Music: Irving Berlin
- Lyrics: Irving Berlin
- Book: Matthew White; Howard Jacques
- Basis: Top Hat by Dwight Taylor; Allan Scott
- Premiere: 16 August 2011: Milton Keynes Theatre
- Productions: 2011 - UK tour 2012 - West End; 2014 - UK & Ireland tour
- Awards: Laurence Olivier Award for Best New Musical

Top Hat the Musical is a 2011 stage musical based on the 1935 film of the same name, featuring music & lyrics by Irving Berlin with additional orchestration by Chris Walker, and a book by Matthew White and Howard Jacques. The show opened on 16 August 2011 at the Milton Keynes Theatre, touring the United Kingdom before transferring to the Aldwych Theatre in London's West End. Top Hat won multiple 2013 Laurence Olivier Awards after receiving seven nominations. The musical closed in London on 26 October 2013, with a UK and Ireland tour commencing in August 2014.

== Background ==
The musical is based on the 1935 film of the same name, with music by Irving Berlin. It took the show's producer, Kenny Wax, sixteen months to obtain the rights from Berlin's estate to adapt the film into a stage musical. A first read-through of the adapted script was held at Sadler's Wells in November 2010, and it was performed for the first time 76 years after the original film. The show features fourteen songs by Berlin, six more songs than the original production. Featuring a 31-person cast, the production was adapted from the original screenplay by Matthew White and Howard Jacques. The show was directed by White with choreography by Bill Deamer, set designs by Hildegard Bechtler, costume design by Jon Morrell, lighting by Peter Mumford, sound by Gareth Owen, new orchestrations by Chris Walker and musical supervision by Richard Balcombe.

The producers for the original tour and the West End production cast Strictly Come Dancing winner Tom Chambers in the role originated by Fred Astaire. During the competition Chambers was compared to Astaire, his hero. Astaire's daughter was in the audience for the show's opening in London, and described Chambers as "wonderful": "There will always be comparisons, but what this show has done is bring a version to the world to see for the future". Two of Berlin's daughters described the show as "a beautiful production": "It could definitely give new life to these songs and to Top Hat for a younger generation".

== Production history ==
=== 2011-12 UK tour ===
The show had its world premiere on 16 August 2011 at the Milton Keynes Theatre, at the beginning of a 17-week UK tour stopping in Birmingham, Southampton, Salford, Plymouth, Norwich, Canterbury, Edinburgh and Leeds. The original cast included Summer Strallen as Dale Tremont, Tom Chambers as Jerry Travers, Martin Ball as Horace, Vivien Parry as Madge Hardwick, Ricardo Afonso as Alberto Beddini and Stephen Boswell as Bates. An additional pre-West-End tour took place in spring 2012, at the New Victoria Theatre in Woking from 13 to 17 March and the Bristol Hippodrome from 21 to 31 March.

=== 2012-13 West End production ===
The production moved to the West End's Aldwych Theatre on 19 April 2012, with its opening night on 9 May and an initial booking until the end of January 2013. Charlotte Gooch took over the role of Dale Tremont in November 2012; on 5 February 2013 Gavin Lee took over the role of Jerry, Broadway star Kristen Beth Williams took over as Dale, Clive Hayward became Horace and Alex Gaumond became Alberto. A final cast change took place after Gaumond left to play Miss Trunchbull in Matilda the Musical: Russell-Leighton Dixon, previously the understudy for Alberto, took over the part. Although the production's run had been extended until April 2014, it closed on 26 October 2013.

=== 2014-15 UK and Ireland tour ===
A further 47-week tour of the United Kingdom and Ireland commenced at the New Wimbledon Theatre, on 12 August 2014, running until July 2015. Featuring a new cast, the production visited Wimbledon, Milton Keynes, Newcastle, Aberdeen, Edinburgh, Wolverhampton, Nottingham, Bristol, Glasgow, Leeds, Cardiff, Oxford, Manchester, Sheffield, Birmingham, Norwich, Canterbury, Plymouth, Southampton, Dublin, Belfast, Sunderland, Woking and Eastbourne. The tour was led by Charlotte Gooch, who reprises the role of Dale, Alan Burkitt as Jerry, Clive Hayward as Horace Hardwick, Rebecca Thornhill as Madge Hardwick, Sebastien Torkia as Alberton Beddini and John Conroy as Bates.

=== 2025 Chichester revival ===
A revival of the musical opened at the Chichester Festival Theatre on 14 July 2025 running until September before a UK tour, directed and choreographed by Kathleen Marshall. The production was later seen in Paris at the Théâtre du Châtelet in April 2026.

In January 2026, a version for the American public broadcasting service (PBS) was filmed at the West End Chichester Festival Theater by Liberator Film Services in collaboration with Concord Originals and RKO Pictures. The television episode "Irving Berlin's Top Hat," starring Phillip Attmore and Amara Okereke premiered on broadcast and for streaming on the PBS series Great Performances in May 2026.

North American Premiere

The musical premiered on North American soil at Surflight Theatre on May 27 running through June 15, 2025, directed and choreographed by Paula Hammons Sloan.

Other productions

- In 2015, the production by Japanese all-female theatre troupe Takarazuka Revue was staged in Umeda Fine Arts and Akasaka ACT Theater; it was directed by Yoshimasa Saitou and featured Cosmos Troupe's Manato Asaka as Jerry Travers and Rion Misaki as Dale Tremont. In 2022, it was staged again in Umeda Arts Theater; it was directed by Yoshimasa Saitou and featured Flower Troupe's Rei Yuzuka as Jerry Travers and Madoka Hoshikaze as Dale Tremont.

== Music ==
=== Musical numbers ===
Act I
New York, USA

- "You Can't Brush Me Off"

London, England

- "How Can I Change My Luck"
- "No Strings (I'm Fancy Free)?"
- "Hotel Scene"
- "I'm Putting All My Eggs in One Basket"
- "Isn't This a Lovely Day (To Be Caught in the Rain)?"
- "Isn't This a Lovely Day (To Be Caught in the Rain)" (Reprise)
- "Gentlemen Prefer Blondes"
- "Top Hat, White Tie and Tails"

Act II
Venice, Italy

- "The Piccolino"
- "You Can't Brush Me Off" (Reprise)
- "Wild About You"
- "Cheek To Cheek"
- "Better Luck Next Time"
- "Latins Know How"
- "Let's Face The Music And Dance"
- "Outside Of That, I Love You"
- "Finale"

The performance runs 2hrs 45mins, including one interval.

=== Cast album ===
Featuring 18 tracks from the London production of Top Hat, the cast album was released by First Night Records on 27 August 2012.

Top Hat - The Musical (Original London Cast Recording)

Soundtrack album cast recording by Various
- Released: 27 August 2012
- Length: 45:12
- Label: First Night Records

No.	Title	Length
1.	"Overture"	2:50
2.	"Puttin' On the Ritz"	2:59
3.	"No Strings (I'm Fancy Free)"	2:53
4.	"No Strings (Reprise)"	1:31
5.	"I'm Putting All My Eggs in One Basket"	2:08
6.	"Isn't This a Lovely Day (To Be Caught in the Rain)?"	3:44
7.	"You're Easy to Dance With"	2:59
8.	"What Is Love?"	2:02
9.	"Top Hat, White Tie and Tails"	3:46
10.	"The Piccolino"	2:36
11.	"Wild About You"	2:30
12.	"Cheek to Cheek"	4:26
13.	"Better Luck Next Time"	3:03
14.	"Latins Know How"	2:29
15.	"Let's Face the Music and Dance"	2:57
16.	"Outside of That, I Love You"	3:09
17.	"I'm Putting All My Eggs in One Basket (Reprise)"	1:24
18.	"Finale"	1:46

== Principal roles and cast members ==
The show features a cast of thirty one and a fifteen-member band.

Character	West End	UK and Ireland tour
Character	2012	2014
Jerry Travers	Tom Chambers	Alan Burkitt
Dale Tremont	Summer Strallen	Charlotte Gooch
Horace Hardwick	Martin Ball	Clive Hayward
Madge Hardwick	Vivien Parry	Rebecca Thornhill
Alberto Beddini	Ricardo Afonso	Sebastien Torkia
Bates	Stephen Boswell	John Conroy

== Critical reception ==
After its world premiere, most Top Hat critics appreciated the spectacle but agreed that the plot was weak; "the plot, for want of a better word, doesn't bear too much close inspection", said Christopher Hart in the Sunday Times. The musical was also criticised for its length. "The second half could be cut down by a good 15 minutes", according to Exeunt magazine.

Michael Billington of The Guardian wrote, "The evening can be quickly summed up as 'great songs, daft book'". Paul Taylor of The Independent said, "The producers of this irresistible show, a freely adapted version of the Fred Astaire and Ginger Rogers movie, don't subscribe to the precept of deferred gratification". London Evening Standard critic Henry Hitchings described the show as "a bit slow hitting its stride".

Top Hat received positive reviews on blogs, with Zoe Craig describing it on the Londonist as "pure, fun, cheery escapist entertainment". Bechtler's set design and Deamer's choreography were praised ("This clever collaboration is clearly evident in every scene transition as the cast dance and interact with the set, making the whole changeover seem like a fluid part of the story") on BestOfTheatre.

== Awards and nominations ==
Despite its mixed reception by critics, Top Hat won the Best Night Out award at the Evening Standard Theatre Awards in 2012, won the 2013 Olivier Award for Best New Musical, Best Choreographer (Bill Deamer) and Best Costume Design (Jon Morrell). The musical was also nominated for five WhatsOnStage Awards.

=== Original London production ===
Year	Award	Category	Nominee	Result	Ref.
2012	Evening Standard Theatre Awards	Best Night Out		Won	
2013	Laurence Olivier Award	Best New Musical		Won	
2013	Laurence Olivier Award	Best Actor in a Musical	Tom Chambers	Nominated	
2013	Laurence Olivier Award	Best Actress in a Musical	Summer Strallen	Nominated	
2013	Laurence Olivier Award	Best Set Design	Hildegard Bechtler	Nominated	
2013	Laurence Olivier Award	Best Sound Design	Gareth Owen	Nominated	
2013	Laurence Olivier Award	Best Costume Design	Jon Morrell	Won	
2013	Laurence Olivier Award	Best Choreographer	Bill Deamer	Won	
2013	WhatsOnStage Awards	Best New Musical		Nominated	
2013	WhatsOnStage Awards	Best Actor in a Musical	Tom Chambers	Nominated	
2013	WhatsOnStage Awards	Best Supporting Actor in a Musical	Ricardo Afonso	Nominated	
2013	WhatsOnStage Awards	Best Supporting Actress in a Musical	Vivien Parry	Nominated	
2013	WhatsOnStage Awards	Best Choreographer	Bill Deamer	Nominated	
