= An Evening with Fred Astaire =

- Directed by: Bud Yorkin
- Presented by: Fred Astaire
- Starring: The Jonah Jones Quartet; David Rose and His Orchestra; Barrie Chase
- Narrated by: Art Gilmore
- Theme music composer: David Rose
- Country of origin: United States
- Original language: English

Production
- Executive producer: Fred Astaire
- Producer: Bud Yorkin
- Production locations: Color City, Burbank, California
- Camera setup: Multiple
- Running time: 58 minutes
- Production companies: Ava Productions, Inc.

Original release
- Network: NBC
- Release: October 17, 1958

An Evening with Fred Astaire is a one-hour live television special starring Fred Astaire, broadcast on NBC on October 17, 1958. It was highly successful, winning nine Emmy awards and spawning three further specials, and technically innovative, as it was the first major television show to be recorded on videotape in color. (Note: The show was performed live at NBC in Burbank for viewers in the Eastern Time Zone; a videotape of the show was transmitted later that evening by NBC Burbank for viewers in the Central, Mountain, and Pacific time zones.) It was produced at NBC's Color City studios in Burbank, California.

A sound recording of the show was released as an LP on the Chrysler Corporation label

Considered something of a comeback for the then 59-year-old Astaire, the special was his first starring role on television. It was directed and co-produced by Bud Yorkin and introduced Astaire's new partner Barrie Chase, whom he would later describe in Interview magazine in 1973 as perhaps his favorite dance partner. The Jonah Jones Quartet and David Rose and his Orchestra provided the music, and the Hermes Pan Dancers appeared in the ensemble dance numbers. The announcer was Art Gilmore, who at the time was the voice of the Chrysler Corporation, the show's sponsor. Typical for advertising of the era, Chrysler's 1959 model year Forward Look cars featured prominently in the show; Astaire's final words were "I only hope the show is as good as the cars."

== The use of videotape ==
The program was highly innovative in its use of a color-capable VTR, a technology then in its infancy.

As with the first major television program to be recorded on videotape—The Edsel Show in 1957—this was a straight recording of a live performance with no editing. Early videotape use was confined largely to rebroadcasting programs from the east coast three hours later in the west, and was a cheaper, better-quality alternative to the film-based kinescopes. The experimental low-band quadruplex recording system in use was troublesome and hard to copy. Furthermore, early video editing was a highly complicated matter that required the engineer to cover the two-inch tape with iron oxide solution to locate the magnetic tracks and then splice it with a razor blade.

Although it was recorded live, An Evening with Fred Astaire used a number of innovative production techniques that are now commonplace, such as chroma key, and dissolves between scenes.

In 1988, the show earned a further technical Emmy Award for Ed Reitan, Don Kent, and Dan Einstein, who restored the original videotape, transferring its contents to a modern format. The machines used for recording the program were modified RCA B/W recorders, so it required tracking down the engineers who had been instrumental in the conversion. (The three had also restored the oldest color videotape known to exist, the dedication of WRC-TV's new studio in Washington, DC on May 21, 1958.)

The show was rebroadcast twice, on NBC on January 26, 1959, and on CBS on December 20, 1964. It was thus one of the earliest shows to be rerun using color videotape recording. The 1964 rebroadcast used a different beginning and ending that eliminated the advertising for Chrysler; instead, the opening and closing dances were shown, uninterrupted.

Until 2024, An Evening with Fred Astaire was the oldest-known surviving color videotape of an entertainment program; 2024 saw the discovery and restoration of a videotape of the premiere of Kraft Music Hall, aired 9 days prior to the Astaire program.

== Musical numbers ==
- "Morning Ride"/"Svengali"/"Frantic Holiday" — Fred Astaire and the Hermes Pan Dancers
- "Change Partners" — Fred Astaire and Barrie Chase
- "Baubles, Bangles & Beads" (Wright and Forrest)
- "Prop Dance" — Fred Astaire
- "Mack the Knife" — The Jonah Jones Quartet
- "Man with the Blues"/"Young Man's Lament" (David Rose)/ "Like Young" (André Previn) — Fred Astaire, Barrie Chase and the Hermes Pan Dancers
- "Old MacDonald on a Trip/Holiday for Strings" (David Rose) — The Hermes Pan Dancers, featuring Jimmy Huntley, Roy Fitzell, and Bert May
- "St. James Infirmary" (Primrose) — Fred Astaire, Barrie Chase, Jonah Jones, and the Hermes Pan Dancers
- "Oh, Lady be Good!" (Ira & George Gershwin)/"Cheek to Cheek" (Irving Berlin)/"A Fine Romance" (Kern & Fields)/"They Can't Take That Away From Me"/"Nice Work If You Can Get It"/"A Foggy Day" (Ira & George Gershwin)/"I Won't Dance" (Kern-Hammerstein-Harbach)/"Something's Gotta Give" (Mercer)/"Night and Day" (Porter)/"Top Hat, White Tie and Tails" (Berlin, also the theme music for the show) — Fred Astaire
- "Isn't This a Lovely Day" — Fred Astaire

The Chrysler Corporation record label, mastered and pressed by NBC partner RCA Victor Records produced a rare giveaway promotional soundtrack album direct from the monaural audio track of the master videotape.

== Sequels ==
Astaire produced another three similar specials, each featuring Barrie Chase:

- Another Evening with Fred Astaire (November 4, 1959) designed by art director Edward Stephenson (Art Direction Emmy Award)
- Astaire Time (September 28, 1960) designed by art director Edward Stephenson (Art Direction Emmy Award)
- The Fred Astaire Show (February 7, 1968) designed by art director James Tritippoo (Art Direction Emmy Award)

== Media coverage ==
Astaire's first foray into television dance, and the introduction of his new dance partner, Barrie Chase, drew significant media coverage, the most prominent being a feature on the cover of TV Guide for October 11–17, 1958 and an inside article: "Now for the Dance Bash", formally announcing the new partnership to the American public. The show went on to win the Trendex rating race for its time slot and the week. TV Guide followed up with an in-depth feature article on December 13, 1958: "How Fred Astaire discovered Barrie Chase" and again featured Astaire and Chase on its cover on October 31, 1959, promoting Another Evening with Fred Astaire.

Not all media coverage was so positive, however. After the show won an unprecedented nine Emmy awards, Ed Sullivan queried whether Astaire should have been awarded the Best Actor Award. Astaire promptly offered to return the award, protesting: "I'm an actor, and this Emmy is for a performance by an actor, isn't it? When I do a difficult pantomime in a dance which tells a story, what do they think it is? Tiddlywinks?". He kept the award, but when Variety reported that MCA had lost $75,000 on the show, he retorted angrily: "Kindly retract erroneous article in last week's Variety. Here are the facts: The entire package is mine, via Ava Productions Corp. MCA merely acted as my agent with the sponsor. Nobody had any cut. All the expenses were paid for by me and the show definitely turned in a sizeable profit. Though I was not interested in that phase, I would like to make it clear that I am not completely nuts. I particularly directed that no expense be spared in carrying out my plans, ideas and designs for the show which I had been working on for some time."

== See also ==
- Three Evenings with Fred Astaire (album)
- Fred Astaire's solo and partnered dances
- 1958 in television
- The Edsel Show
