= You'll Never Get Rich =

1941 film by Sidney Lanfield

- Theatrical release poster
- Directed by: Sidney Lanfield
- Written by: Michael Fessier; Ernest Pagano
- Produced by: Samuel Bischoff
- Starring: Fred Astaire; Rita Hayworth; Robert Benchley; John Hubbard; Osa Massen; Frieda Inescort; Guinn Williams; Donald MacBride
- Cinematography: Philip Tannura
- Edited by: Otto Meyer
- Music by: Cole Porter; Morris Stoloff
- Production company: Columbia Pictures
- Distributed by: Columbia Pictures
- Release date: September 25, 1941
- Running time: 88 minutes
- Country: United States
- Language: English

You'll Never Get Rich is a 1941 American musical comedy film directed by Sidney Lanfield and starring Fred Astaire and Rita Hayworth, with music and lyrics by Cole Porter. The title references the U.S. Army song lyric: "You'll never get rich / By digging a ditch / You're in the Army now!"

The film marked Hayworth's first starring role in a major production from Columbia Pictures and played a significant role in launching her to stardom. During production, Life magazine featured Hayworth on its cover, with a promotional photograph that became one of the most widely circulated pin-ups of the era. Hayworth received praise for her work with Astaire, who later credited the film with revitalizing his career following his split with Ginger Rogers.

The film was a commercial success and received two Academy Award nominations for Best Original Song for "Since I Kissed My Baby Goodbye" by Cole Porter and Best Music, Scoring of a Musical Picture by Morris Stoloff.

== Plot ==
In a New York theater, the womanizing owner, Martin Cortland, tries to woo dancer Sheila by giving her a diamond bracelet, hoping for a romantic payoff. He enlists his choreographer, Robert Curtis, to help win her over. Robert, usually aloof, is unexpectedly impressed by Sheila's talent and personality—something even dancer Margo finds surprising.

Martin's plans unravel when his wife, Julia, discovers the bracelet—meant for Sheila—while searching for her own anniversary gift. Caught off guard, Martin claims the bracelet was from Robert to Sheila. Julia, unimpressed, slyly tells a paparazzo that Robert and Sheila are engaged, prompting gossip columns to run with the false story.

Robert, furious, confronts Sheila, who is just as confused. Sheila's would-be fiancé, Army Captain Tom Barton, visits her apartment during the argument. Posing as Sheila's brother, he threatens Robert with an unloaded gun before storming off, leaving Sheila and her Aunt Louise laughing at the prank.

Fearing for his safety and disillusioned with Martin, Robert enlists in the Army. At training camp, he befriends fellow recruits Swivel Tongue and Kewpie Blain. Sheila sends back the bracelet with a kind letter, and Robert realizes her sincerity and depth.

Sheila later visits the camp with her aunt to see Tom and his mother. While there, she hears music from the guardhouse and discovers Robert tap dancing with a group of soldiers. When they talk, he pretends to be an officer; Sheila sees through the lie but plays along. Trying to impress her again, Robert steals a captain's uniform and visits her at Tom's mother's house—unaware of whose house it is.

Tom and two fellow captains arrive for lunch. Recognizing Robert, they pretend not to know him and play along with his fake identity as a Washington inspector. Tom asks how to punish someone who stole an officer's uniform. Realizing he is caught, Robert awkwardly suggests guardhouse duty and leaves with Sheila, who is amused.

Martin arrives at the camp to stage a morale-boosting show. Robert agrees to assist only if Sheila is cast as the lead dancer, though Martin has promised the role to another dancer, Sonya. After rehearsals, Martin agrees Sheila is better suited. Their shared performance rekindles Robert and Sheila's chemistry.

Tom tells Sheila he is being transferred to Panama and proposes marriage. Their families expect the match, but Sheila hesitates, later telling her aunt she still loves Robert and believes he will propose.

Robert invites Sheila to his apartment, but Sonya is there. A misunderstanding over a mislabeled bracelet leads to a blow-up, and Sheila refuses to perform. After a troop protest, she agrees to return. Robert then arranges for a real priest to marry them during the show's wedding finale.

After the curtain falls, Robert reveals to Sheila—and the audience—that the wedding was legally binding. Martin later admits to Sheila that the bracelet scheme was entirely his doing. Relieved, Sheila embraces her new husband. Tom graciously arranges for Robert's release so he can begin his honeymoon, just as Swivel and Kewpie attempt a botched jailbreak, unaware Robert is already gone.

== Cast ==
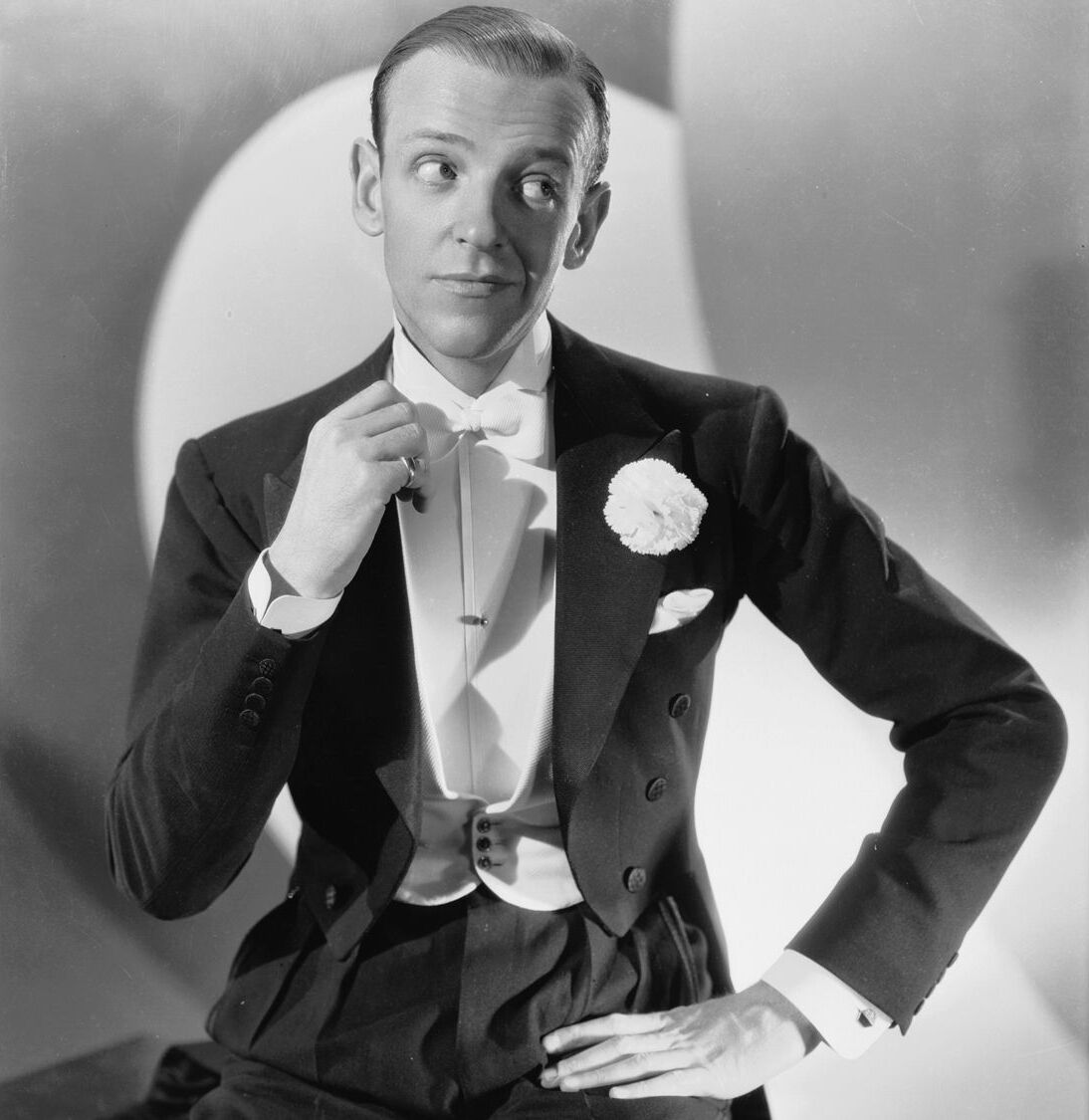
Publicity still with Astaire for film

- Fred Astaire as Robert Curtis
- Rita Hayworth as Sheila Winthrop
- Robert Benchley as Martin Cortland
- John Hubbard as Captain Tom Barton
- Osa Massen as Sonya
- Frieda Inescort as Mrs. Julia Cortland
- Guinn Williams as Kewpie Blain
- Donald MacBride as Top Sergeant
- Cliff Nazarro as Swivel Tongue "Swiv"
- Marjorie Gateson as Aunt Louise
- Ann Shoemaker as Mrs. Barton
- Boyd Davis as Colonel Shiller
- Patti McCarty as young girl (uncredited)

== Key songs and dance routines ==
The dance director was Robert Alton, Astaire's second-most-frequent choreographic collaborator, after Hermes Pan. Because Astaire generally choreographed his own and his partner's routines, Alton concentrated on the choruses. The choreography explores a diverse range of musical rhythms, some of which are artfully juxtaposed in Cole Porter's score.

- "Rehearsal Duet": A short but virtuosic tap number, with Astaire and Hayworth dancing side by side.
- "Boogie Barcarolle": A Porter number that, not unlike Robert Russell Bennett's Waltz In Swing Time from Swing Time, overlays two very different musical rhythms. Astaire leads the chorus, which includes Hayworth in an exhilarating and, for Astaire, unusual routine.
- "Shootin' the Works for Uncle Sam": A song-and-dance number in which Astaire and chorus march through Grand Central Terminal. The choreography expresses the notion that Broadway-style dance rehearsals and army camp drills have much in common. The music and dance contrast march and jazz rhythms.
- "Since I Kissed My Baby Goodbye": A haunting and melancholy Porter standard introduced by the Four Tones, an African-American quartet (lead singer Lucius "Dusty" Brooks, Leon Buck, Rudolph Hunter and John Porter), followed by a short Astaire solo, and all executed in the unrealistic (for its time) setting of an unsegregated guard house. Astaire also made a successful recording of this number with Decca in September 1941, backed by the Delta Rhythm Boys.
- "March Milastaire (A-Stairable Rag)": Another Porter number contrasting march and jazz rhythms, danced in a "tour de force" tap solo by Astaire, who expresses his sudden joy of being in love by using his taps to make as much noise as possible. This time, the purely instrumental African-American backing group comprised the twenty-year-old Chico Hamilton on drums, Buddy Collette (clarinet), Red Mack (trumpet), Alfred Grant (guitar) and Joe Comfort (jug).
- "So Near and Yet So Far": Porter's rumba melody is set to lyrics (sung by Astaire), which sum up the nature of Hayworth's irresistible allure. Astaire, clearly inspired by Hayworth's exceptional Latin dance pedigree, delivers his first onscreen synthesis of Latin-American and ballroom dance steps in a celebrated romantic partnering.
- "The Wedding Cake Walk": Liltin' Martha Tilton's rendition of this cheerful song is followed by a routine involving Astaire, Hayworth and a large chorus, the former pair ending up dancing on a wedding cake in the shape of a tank.
