= Coney Island (1943 film) =

1943 film by Walter Lang

- Original film poster
- Directed by: Walter Lang
- Written by: George Seaton
- Produced by: William Perlberg
- Starring: Betty Grable; George Montgomery; Cesar Romero; Charles Winninger; Phil Silvers
- Cinematography: Ernest Palmer
- Edited by: Robert L. Simpson
- Music by: Original music: Ralph Rainger; Non original music: Otto Harbach
- Distributed by: 20th Century Fox
- Release dates: June 11, 1943 (San Francisco, premiere)
- Running time: 96 minutes
- Country: United States
- Language: English
- Budget: $1.6 million
- Box office: $3.305 million (U.S. and Canada rentals)

Coney Island is a 1943 American Technicolor musical film released by Twentieth Century Fox and starring Betty Grable in one of her biggest hits. A "gay nineties" musical (set in that time period), it also featured George Montgomery, Cesar Romero, and Phil Silvers, was choreographed by Hermes Pan, and was directed by Walter Lang. Betty Grable also starred in the 1950 remake, Wabash Avenue.

In 1944, the year after the film was released, it was nominated for an Oscar for Alfred Newman in the category of Best Music, Scoring of a Musical Picture

The film is also known as: Coney Island in Sweden, L'île aux plaisirs in France, L'isola delle sirene in Italy, San oneiro in Greece, Se necesitan maridos in Spain and Tivolin kaunotar in Finland.

== Plot ==
In 1905, promoter Eddie Johnson goes to Coney Island to find his rival and pal, Joe Rocco who cheated him out of his share of the carnival they ran together. Eddie is determined to obtain a share in Joe's new saloon, which features singer Kate Farley, but after Eddie denigrates Kate's low-class style, Joe orders him to leave.

Eddie then persuades his friend Frankie, who runs a sideshow featuring a tattooed woman, to allow him to turn it into a Turkish Harem with dancing girls. Kate, who is mad about Eddie's earlier insults, heckles him, but his idea is a smash and draws away Joe's customers. When Kate informs Joe about Eddie's success, he sends his thugs to destroy the place. In retaliation, Eddie and Frankie instigate a huge fistfight in Joe's saloon, and during the fracas, Joe accidentally knocks out Finnegan, a lovable souse. Eddie and Frankie spirit Finnegan away and give him money to go to Atlantic City for a month, then stage a fake funeral for him. Eddie convinces Joe that he killed Finnegan and threatens to turn him over the police unless he is allowed to make over and run the saloon.

Joe reluctantly acquiesces, although Kate is more resistant when Eddie attempts to tone down her garish costumes and frenetic singing. Eddie's methods are successful, and within two weeks, the saloon's business has tripled and Kate is a hit. One afternoon, Finnegan appears in the saloon, and Joe figures out Eddie's ruse, but decides to bide his time to exact revenge. As the weeks pass, Eddie and Kate fall in love, and Eddie makes plans to open his own nightclub. Joe grows jealous of their romance and argues with Eddie, who reveals his plans to leave and take Kate with him.

In order to prevent Eddie from getting Kate, Joe is willing to give her up himself, and writes to Broadway impresario William Hammerstein, who comes to hear her sing. Eddie and Frankie conspire to get her out of the saloon that night, however, and when Joe learns that Kate has missed her audition, he tells her that Eddie is only using her. Crushed, Kate accompanies Joe to Hammerstein's theater the next day to sing for him, but reconciles with Eddie when he apologizes.

They prepare to marry that afternoon, but Joe again comes between them by hiring an actor to tell Kate that Eddie has secured a bank loan for his club by using her singing services as collateral. Kate is devastated and breaks up with Eddie, despite his pleas of innocence. Later, Hammerstein stages a show starring Kate, and Joe, who acts as her business manager, proposes to her. Kate gently refuses, and when Eddie appears backstage that evening, he tricks Joe into revealing that he broke up their wedding as an astonished Kate listens.

Kate returns to the stage, but after the finale, Joe sneaks Eddie into the orchestra to play the piano. Kate realizes that Eddie is there, and the couple smile at each other as she sings a romantic ballad to him.

== Cast ==
- Betty Grable as Kate Farley
- George Montgomery as Eddie Johnson
- Cesar Romero as Joe Rocco
- Charles Winninger as Finnegan
- Phil Silvers as Frankie
- Matt Briggs as William Hammerstein
- Paul Hurst as Louie
- Frank Orth as the Bartender

== Soundtrack ==
- "Take It from There"

Music by Ralph Rainger
Lyrics by Leo Robin

- "Beautiful Coney Island"

Music by Ralph Rainger
Lyrics by Leo Robin

- "Miss Lulu from Louisville"

Music by Ralph Rainger
Lyrics by Leo Robin

- "Get the Money"

Music by Ralph Rainger
Lyrics by Leo Robin

- "There's Danger in a Dance"

Music by Ralph Rainger
Lyrics by Leo Robin

- "Old Demon Rum"

Music by Ralph Rainger
Lyrics by Leo Robin

- "Put Your Arms Around Me, Honey (I Never Knew Any Girl Like You)"

Music by Albert von Tilzer
Lyrics by Junie McCree

- "Cuddle Up a Little Closer"

Words by Otto A. Harbach (as O.A. Hauerbach)
Music by Karl Hoschna (as Karl L. Hoschna)

- "When Irish Eyes Are Smiling"

Music by Ernest Ball
Lyrics by Chauncey Olcott and George Graff Jr.

- "Pretty Baby"

Music by Egbert Van Alstyne and Tony Jackson
Lyrics by Gus Kahn

- "The Darktown Strutters' Ball"

Written by Shelton Brooks

== Radio adaptations ==
Coney Island was twice presented as a one-hour adaptation on Lux Radio Theatre. On April 17, 1944 Dorothy Lamour and Alan Ladd played the leads. Then on September 30, 1946, Grable reprised her screen role, joined by Victor Mature and Barry Sullivan.
