= So Near and yet So Far =

Single by Fred Astaire
- B-side: "Since I Kissed My Baby Goodbye"
- Published: 1941
- Released: October 1941
- Recorded: September 10, 1941
- Genre: Traditional pop
- Length: 3:08
- Label: Decca
- Songwriter: Cole Porter

"So Near and yet So Far" is a song written by Cole Porter, for the 1941 film You'll Never Get Rich, where it was introduced by Fred Astaire, and accompanied a dance with Astaire and Rita Hayworth, choreographed by Robert Alton. Astaire and Hayworth's performance was significant as the only occasion where Astaire's female dancing partner led the choreography of the dance. Porter's biographer, William McBrien described the song as "beautiful and highly successful".

Priscilla Peña Ovalle in her book Dance and the Hollywood Latina describes the song as a "latune", a "tune with a Latin beat and an English-language lyric" that was a "U.S. consumer-friendly approximation" of an Afro-Cuban rumba. Theorist Gustavo Perez Firmat discussed "So Near and yet So Far" in his book The Havana Habit and described it as "the most elegant rumba ever captured on film".

== Notable recordings ==
- Eugenie Baird with Tony Pastor (1941 - Bluebird B-11267)
- Bobby Short – Bobby Short Loves Cole Porter (Atlantic, 1972)
- Ella Fitzgerald – Ella Loves Cole (Atlantic, 1972)
