= Robert Alton =

American dancer and choreographer

- Alton in 1929
- Born: Robert Alton Hart; January 28, 1902; Bennington, Vermont, US
- Died: June 12, 1957 (aged 55); Los Angeles, California, US
- Occupations: Choreographer, dancer
- Spouse: Marjery Fielding (1926–1929)

Robert Alton Hart (January 28, 1902 – June 12, 1957), known professionally as Robert Alton, was an American dancer and choreographer, a major figure in dance choreography of Broadway and Hollywood musicals from the 1930s through to the early 1950s. He is principally remembered today as the discoverer of Gene Kelly, for his collaborations with Fred Astaire, and for choreographic sequences he designed for Hollywood musicals such as The Harvey Girls (1946), Till the Clouds Roll By (1946), Show Boat (1951), and White Christmas (1954).

== Biography ==
Alton was Robert Alton Hart in Bennington, Vermont. (Note: Reference works vary on the year of his birth, including 1897, 1903, and 1906. Historic sources and primary birth and death records give his birth year as 1902.) He attended Bennington High School and studied dance with Ralph MacKernan in Springfield, Massachusetts, as well in New York studying with Bert French and Mikhail Mordkin, formerly of the Bolshoi Ballet and Sergey Diaghilev's Ballets Russes. His Broadway stage dancing début was with Mordkin's company in Take It from Me (1919), followed by Greenwich Follies (1924) and Some Day (1925) which failed to make it to Broadway. He also choreographed.

With his wife, Marjery Fielding, he created a dance act and subsequently managed a line of chorus girls in vaudeville. When his wife took a sabbatical to have a baby, he took over dance direction at St. Louis movie theatres while teaching at Clark's Dance School in St. Louis. There his students included Donn Arden and Betty Grable.

Alton with dance partner and former wife Marjery Fielding c. 1922

After a series of successful stagings at New York's Paramount Theatre in 1933, he began a choreographic career which encompassed many of the most successful Broadway hits of the 1930s and 1940s including The Ziegfeld Follies of 1934, 1936 and 1942. He collaborated with Cole Porter, Rodgers and Hart and Rodgers and Hammerstein on Me and Juliet in 1953. He learned stage direction from John Murray Anderson and during his Broadway career he was instrumental in furthering the careers of Ray Bolger, John Brascia, Don Crichton, Betty Grable, Gene Kelly, Sheree North, Vera-Ellen and Charles Walters, among others.

He is credited with transforming Broadway choreography by breaking up the chorus (which until then was a precision line) into featured soloists and small groups, and his musical staging was celebrated for its elegance and attention to detail. His theatre credits include Early to Bed, Life Begins at 8:40, The Vamp, Anything Goes, Du Barry Was a Lady, Panama Hattie, Pal Joey, and Hazel Flagg.

Alton choreographed his first Hollywood film, Strike Me Pink, in 1936, and became one of the leading choreographers during the golden age of the Hollywood musical film, serving as dance director for MGM from 1944-1951. He continued to work on Broadway during this period and, in 1952 won a Tony Award for his revival of Pal Joey which he had originally choreographed in 1940, catapulting the young Gene Kelly to stardom. He also directed the films Merton of the Movies (1947) and Pagan Love Song (1950) for MGM.

During this time period. Alton staged and choreographed the dynamic nightclub act, "Kay Thompson and the Williams Brothers", which successfully toured the world from 1947 to 1952.

In 1957, he was working on the film version of Pal Joey when he collapsed. His place was taken by Fred Astaire's principal collaborator, Hermes Pan. Alton died on June 12 in Cedars of Lebanon Hospital, in Los Angeles of a kidney ailment. He was buried in the family plot in Bennington.

== Contributions to dance ==
According to Straus, "Alton moved chorus dancing into a new era, by featuring soloists and small groups, and requiring the chorus to be adept at both ballet and tap." He discovered Gene Kelly and worked with Fred Astaire, Cyd Charisse, Marilyn Monroe, and the Nicholas Brothers.

Unlike Agnes de Mille and Jack Cole, who worked to expand their choreographic vocabulary, Alton synthesized dance material already popular at the time, and wanted performers to "distill their personalities through their dancing."
