= Hermes Pan =

American dancer and choreographer

- Born: Hermes Joseph Panagiotopoulos; December 10, 1909; Memphis, Tennessee, U.S.
- Died: September 19, 1990 (aged 80); Beverly Hills, California, U.S.
- Occupations: Dancer, choreographer
- Years active: 1928–1968

Hermes Pan (born Hermes Joseph Panagiotopoulos, December 10, 1909 – September 19, 1990) was an American dancer and choreographer, principally remembered as Fred Astaire's choreographic collaborator on the famous 1930s movie musicals starring Astaire and Ginger Rogers. He worked on nearly two dozen films and TV shows with Astaire. He won both an Oscar and an Emmy for his dance direction.

Born in Memphis, Tennessee, as the son of a Greek immigrant and an American woman from the South, Pan moved to New York City with his family when he was 14. He started dancing in amateur productions and speakeasies. He was first paid to dance at age 19 and worked in several Broadway productions. In 1930 he moved to California, where he met Astaire in 1933 and began working with him; he choreographed 89 films.

== Early life ==
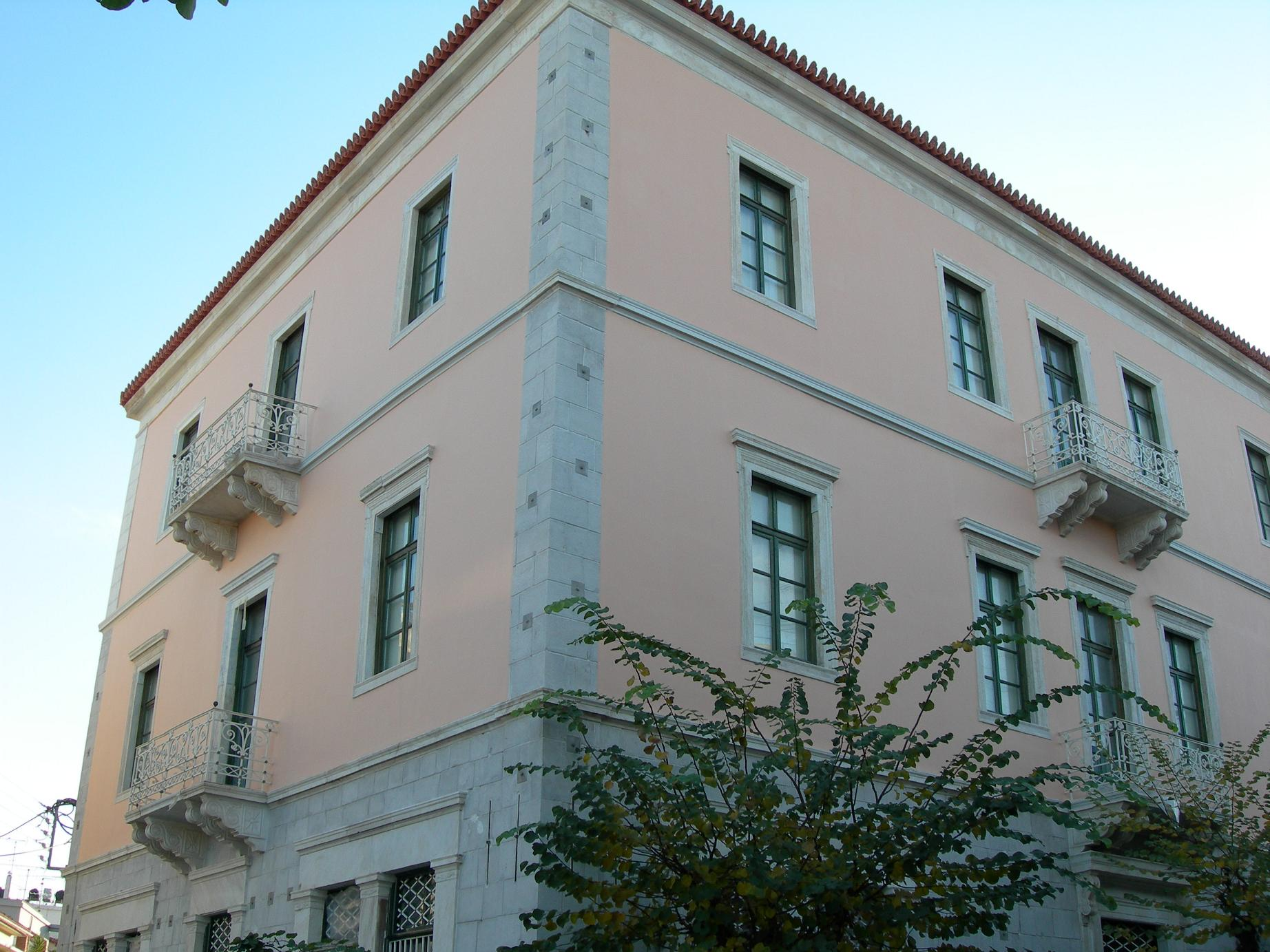
Panagiotopoulos mansion, Aigio.

Pan was born Hermes Joseph Panagiotopoulos in 1909 in Memphis, Tennessee, to Pantelis Panagiotopoulos, a Greek immigrant, and Mary Aljeanne Huston, a Southerner of English and Scots-Irish ancestry dating to colonial times. His father was a confectioner by trade, and from a prominent family in Aigio, Greece. His family had opened the first theater in the city.

In 1895, at the age of twenty-seven, Pantelis Panagiotopoulos was chosen to represent Aigio at the Tennessee Centennial and International Exposition in Nashville as a "Greek Consul to the South." Initially intending to return to Greece, he stayed in Tennessee after meeting Mary Huston of Nashville in 1900. Her family had roots in the South dating to colonial times. The couple married in 1901. Pantelis' brother Alkis also immigrated to the US, initially living in Nashville.

In 1903, Pantelis became a United States citizen, he and Mary moved to Memphis, and their first son Panos was born. Their daughter, Vasso Maria, was born there in 1906. Both children were named after Panagiotopoulos's parents. Pantelis became president of the Eutrophia Company, which owned the Eutrophia Hotel and Cafe in Memphis, and the family was well-off. Hermes, their second son and last child, was born in Memphis in 1909.

In 1911, two years after the boy's birth, the family returned to Nashville. Panagiotopoulos opened up his own restaurant. Hermes was interested in music and dance from an early age. In 1915 "Aunt Betty" Clark, the children's African-American nanny, took Hermes to her neighborhood, a black enclave of Nashville, to introduce him to jazz music and tap dance. He was greatly influenced by this.

Hermes befriended Aunt Betty's son, Sam Clark, who also worked for his family. Sam, a talented dancer, taught the boy many of the era's popular dances, and Hermes practiced on his own.

His father died of tuberculosis in 1922 in San Antonio. Upset at being excluded from his brother's will, his brother Alkis held the widow Mary, and her children Vasso and Hermes at gunpoint. He burned all their shares and money, saying that if he could not have them, no one would.

== Move to New York ==
In 1923 Mary shortened the family name to Pan and took her family to New York City, accompanied by Sam Clark. Initially they had enough money to live comfortably on the Upper West Side, but soon their money ran out. At their lowest ebb, the family had only potatoes and coffee for a meal. They vowed to commemorate that day; every year on June 13, they wrote down what they did and ate that day in a journal. They made the date a family celebration. But the eldest son, Panos, who had helped support the family, died in 1927.

Pan's dance career began with an appearance at age 19 as a chorus boy in 1928 in the Marx Brothers Broadway production of Animal Crackers. Pan first met Ginger Rogers in 1930, when he appeared as a chorus singer in the Broadway musical Top Speed. He also danced in partnership with his sister Vasso. Both Pan and his sister moved to Los Angeles by 1930.

The young adults shared a house before Vasso married, along with their mother Mary, and their brother's widow Dorothy and daughter Aljeanne, named for their mother. Pan eventually had a house in Beverly Hills. Vasso Pan performed in the chorus of many of the Astaire-Rogers pictures.

Pan had retained links with his father's relatives in Greece. In the 1920s, he made an extensive visit to Aigio and Greece to meet them. Pan was a devout Roman Catholic and took spiritual meaning from his dancing. He was known as a homosexual in his circles, but was very private.

== Collaboration with Fred Astaire ==
Fred Astaire and Hermes Pan working out a dance routine, c. 1937

Pan met Fred Astaire on the set of Flying Down to Rio (1933), in which he worked as an assistant to dance director Dave Gould. While Astaire was trying to work out a series of steps for "The Carioca", someone told him that Pan had a few ideas, and the dancer was invited over. Pan demonstrated a brief break he had picked up from his street days in New York.

From then on the two began a lifelong professional collaboration and friendship. Pan worked on all the RKO Astaire pictures. He was nominated for Academy Awards for the "Top Hat" and "The Piccolino" numbers from Top Hat (1935) and for the "Bojangles of Harlem"' number from Swing Time (1936). In 1937 he received the Academy Award for Best Dance Direction for A Damsel in Distress (1937), in which Joan Fontaine starred with Astaire.

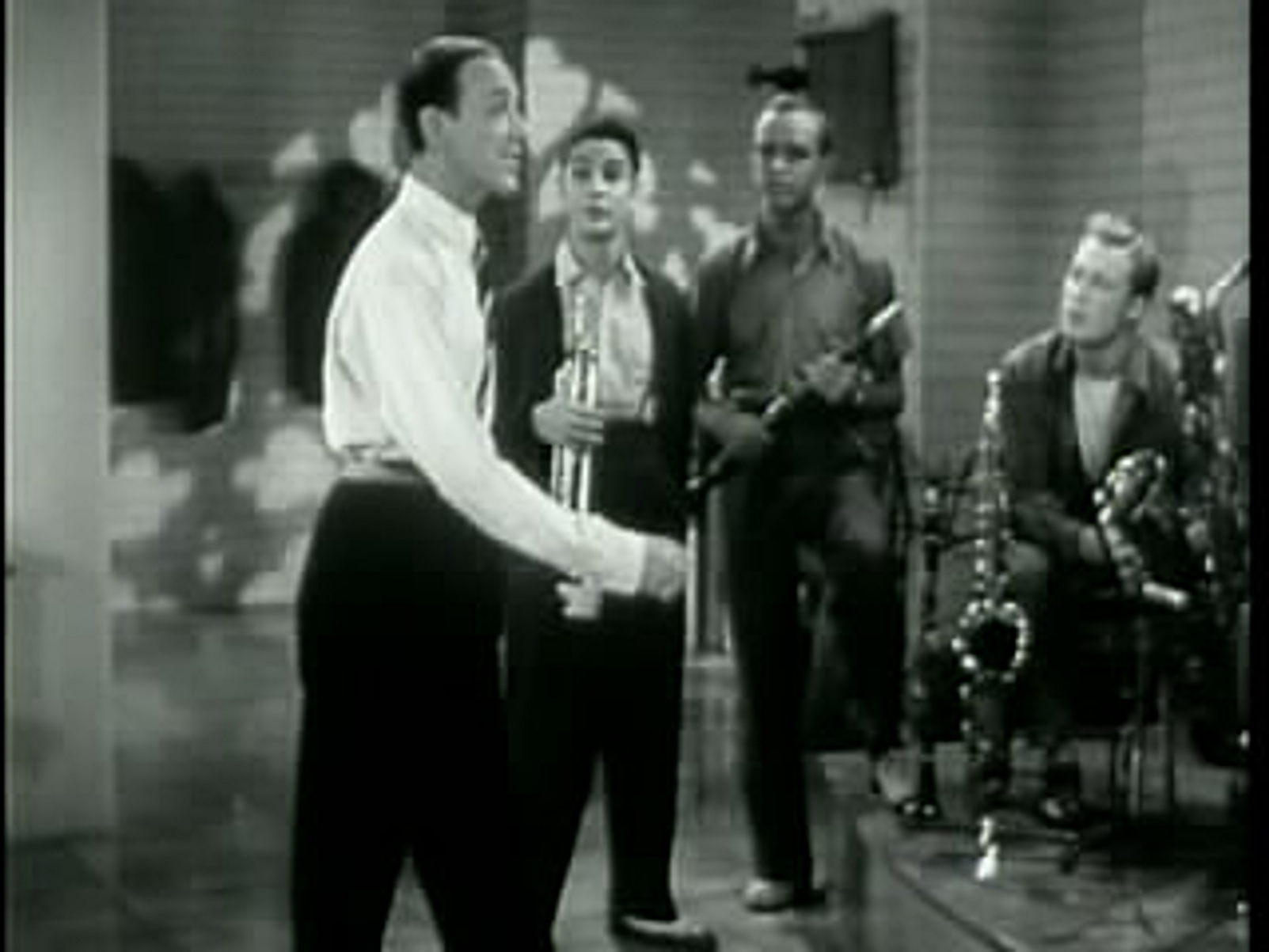
Astaire and Pan (standing third from left) in Second Chorus (1940)

The Astaire-Pan collaboration, involving 17 of Astaire's 31 musical films and three of his four television specials, is widely accepted as one of the most important forces in dance choreography of 20th-century film and television musicals. Astaire called Pan his "idea man," and while he generally choreographed his own routines, he greatly valued the assistance of Pan not just as a critic, but also as a rehearsal partner for the purposes of fine-tuning a routine.

Given Astaire's obsessive rehearsal habits, this was no mean task. Pan also performed the essential function of teaching and rehearsing Ginger Rogers, whose many other commitments during the filming of the Astaire-Rogers musicals often conflicted with Astaire's rehearsal schedule. In addition, Pan recorded Ginger's taps in post production on all their movies made after Roberta (1935).

Pan continued to collaborate with Astaire until the latter's last musical picture, Finian's Rainbow (1968), which was a disaster on a number of fronts. The young director, Francis Ford Coppola, had no prior experience with musical films and rode roughshod over Astaire's and Pan's plans for the film's dance routines. Coppola reintroduced the style of dancing camera of the early 1930s, which Astaire had done so much to banish from the Hollywood musical. Eventually Coppola fired Pan, who had a small walk-on part in the film; Coppola has since acknowledged his own primary responsibility for the film's artistic failure. Coppola was embarrassed that Astaire's feet were cropped out on some dance routines when the film was reformatted to 70mm.

== Film appearances ==
Pan's first on-screen appearance is as a clarinetist during the Astaire-Goddard routine, "I Ain't Hep To That Step But I'll Dig It", in Second Chorus (1940). He dressed as The Ghost in the deleted (and only) Astaire–Pan routine, "Me and the Ghost Upstairs," from that same film.

He appeared with Betty Grable in Moon Over Miami (1941 film) and Coney Island (1943).

Hermes Pan and Rita Hayworth in the dance routine "On the Gay White Way" from My Gal Sal (1942)

His longest filmed dance routine is a complex tap duet with Grable in Footlight Serenade (1942 film), which reflects his work with Astaire and Rogers. His similarity to Astaire is striking. Pan also appeared with Rita Hayworth in My Gal Sal (1942) and with Betty Grable again in Pin Up Girl (1944). In these films he had non-speaking dancing roles and served chiefly as choreographer. In 1950, he danced with Lana Turner in a party scene in A Life of Her Own. These are his only dance performances on film (except for a brief but credited appearance in Kiss Me Kate as "Soldier Boy") – performances which have allowed comparisons between Pan's and Astaire's dance styles.

When not working with Astaire, Pan was much in demand as a choreographer throughout the golden age of the Hollywood musical. He has been described "as sensitive to the eye of the camera as to the lines of the human body", and changing dance for camera, as well as influencing the "ways in which Americans watch dance." He assisted LeRoy Prinz in choreographing the all-black musical Lucky Day (1936–37). He choreographed Lovely to Look At (1952), Kiss Me Kate (1953, in which Bob Fosse also choreographed and danced), and Pal Joey (1957), where he made his final onscreen appearance as the dress rehearsal choreographer leading the chorus girls in their steps.

== Legacy and honors ==
- Nominated for Academy Awards for the "Top Hat" and "The Piccolino" dance numbers from Top Hat (1935).
- Nominated for Academy Award for the "Bojangles of Harlem"' dance number from Swing Time (1936).
- Received the Academy Award for Best Dance Direction for A Damsel in Distress (1937).
- Received an Emmy Award for the 1961 television special, An Evening with Fred Astaire.
- Received a National Film Award in 1980.
- The Joffrey Ballet gave him an award in 1986 for contributions to American dance.
- Credited as Choreographer for the 1968 Edition of Folies Bergere at The Tropicana Hotel Las Vegas.

== Filmography ==
=== Choreographer ===
- Flying Down to Rio (1933) (assistant)
- The Gay Divorcee (1934)
- Roberta (1935)
- Old Man Rhythm (1935)
- Top Hat (1935)
- In Person (1935)
- I Dream Too Much (1935)
- Follow the Fleet (1936)
- Swing Time (1936)
- Shall We Dance? (1937)
- Damsel in Distress (1937)
- Radio City Revels (1938)
- Carefree (1938)
- The Story of Vernon and Irene Castle (1939)
- Second Chorus (1940)
- Sun Valley Serenade (1941)
- That Night in Rio (1941)
- Blood and Sand (1941) (uncredited)
- Moon over Miami (1941) (also dancer)
- My Gal Sal (1942) (also dancer)
- Footlight Serenade (1942) (also dancer)
- Song of the Islands (1942)
- Springtime in the Rockies (1942)
- Hello, Frisco, Hello (1943)
- Coney Island (1943)
- Sweet Rosie O'Grady (1943) (also dancer)
- Pin Up Girl (1944) (also dancer)
- Irish Eyes Are Smiling (1944)
- Billy Rose's Diamond Horseshoe (1945)
- Blue Skies (1946)
- I Wonder Who's Kissing Her Now (1947)
- The Barkleys of Broadway (1949)
- Three Little Words (1950)
- Let's Dance (1950)
- Excuse My Dust (1951)
- Texas Carnival (1951)
- Lovely to Look At (1952)
- Sombrero (1953)
- Kiss Me Kate (1953)
- The Student Prince (1954)
- Jupiter's Darling (1954)
- Hit the Deck (1955)
- Meet Me in Las Vegas (1956)
- Silk Stockings (1957)
- Pal Joey (1957)
- Porgy and Bess (1959)
- The Blue Angel (1959)
- Can-Can (1960)
- Flower Drum Song (1961)
- Cleopatra (1963)
- My Fair Lady (1964)
- Finian's Rainbow (1968) (also actor)
- Darling Lili (1970)
- Lost Horizon (1973)
- Help Me Dream (1981)

=== Actor ===
- Second Chorus (1940) – College Clarinetist (uncredited)
- Moon over Miami (1941) – Kay's Dance Partner in Conga Number (uncredited)
- My Gal Sal (1942) – Sally's Dancing Partner
- Footlight Serenade (1942) – Assistant Dance Director (uncredited)
- Coney Island (1943) – Specialty Dancer (uncredited)
- Sweet Rosie O'Grady (1943) – Madge's Dancing Partner (uncredited)
- Pin Up Girl (1944) – Apache Dancer (uncredited)
- A Life of Her Own (1950) – Specialty Dancer
- Kiss Me Kate (1953) – Sailor (credited as "Soldier Boy")
- Pal Joey (1957) – Choreographer at Dress Rehearsal (uncredited) (final film role)

== Personal life ==
Pan never married. According to John Franceschina in his book, Hermes Pan: The Man Who Danced with Fred Astaire, it was well known in the movie industry that Pan was gay. This was not publicly known during Pan's lifetime, and the identity of most of his partners is not known. He had a niece, Michelene Laski.

Pan's friendships were wide in and outside the world of Hollywood. He became friends with the Shah of Iran, Mohammad Reza Pahlavi, who invited him to the country's 2,500-year celebration of the Persian Empire at Persepolis. He was also close to painter Diego Rivera, who painted his full portrait. He was very close friends with Rita Hayworth, and was a pallbearer at her funeral.

Toward the end of his life, Pan visited Greece. He spent time especially in his father's city of Aigio, where he visited the family's mansion and met many relatives.

== Death ==
Hermes Pan died in Beverly Hills, California, on September 19, 1990, aged 80, from undisclosed causes. He was survived by his sister Vasso Pan, niece Michelene Laski, and several other nieces and nephews.
