= Second Chorus =

- re-release poster
- Directed by: H. C. Potter
- Written by: Frank Cavett (orig. story)
- Screenplay by: Elaine Ryan; Ian McLellan Hunter; Johnny Mercer (contributor); Ben Hecht (uncredited)
- Produced by: Boris Morros
- Starring: Paulette Goddard; Fred Astaire
- Cinematography: Theodor Sparkuhl
- Edited by: Jack Dennis
- Music by: Artie Shaw; Hal Borne; Johnny Mercer
- Production company: Paramount Pictures
- Release date: December 3, 1940 (U.S.)
- Running time: 84 minutes
- Country: United States
- Language: English

Second Chorus is a 1940 Hollywood musical comedy film starring Paulette Goddard and Fred Astaire and featuring Artie Shaw, Burgess Meredith and Charles Butterworth, with music by Artie Shaw, Bernie Hanighen and Hal Borne, and lyrics by Johnny Mercer. The film was directed by H. C. Potter and produced independently for Paramount Pictures by Boris Morros, with associate producers Robert Stillman and (uncredited) Fred Astaire. The film's copyright expired in 1968 and it is now in the public domain.

== Plot ==
Second Chorus (1940)

Danny O'Neill and Hank Taylor are friends and rival trumpeters with "O'Neill's Perennials", a college band. Both have managed to prolong their college careers by failing seven years in a row. At a performance, Ellen Miller catches the eye of Danny and Hank. She serves them a summons notice for her boss, a debt collector. However, the fast-talking O'Neill and Taylor soon have her working as their manager, where her business savvy increases their gigs. Meanwhile, tired of losing several gigs to the Perennials, Artie Shaw persuades Ellen to be his booking manager.

Ellen tries to get Danny and Hank an audition for Shaw's band, but their jealous hijinks get them the boot. Ellen talks Shaw into letting rich "wannabe" mandolin player, J. Lester Chisholm, back a concert. When Hank pretends to be Ellen's jealous husband, then her brother, the plan to get Chisholm as backer nearly fails. But using the "brother" ploy, Danny and Hank get Chisholm back on board, then get Shaw to agree to put Danny's song into the show. All they have to do is keep Chisholm and his mandolin (which he wants to play in the concert) away from Shaw until after the show. Hank's solution is to drop sleeping pills into Chisholm's drink, but Chisholm knocks out Hank the same way.

To Ellen's relief, Danny finally acts responsibly and arranges his number for the show, which Shaw says "has really grown up into something special." He hands the baton to Danny, who successfully conducts his composition while tap-dancing in front of the band. Danny and Ellen then drive off into the night.

== Cast ==
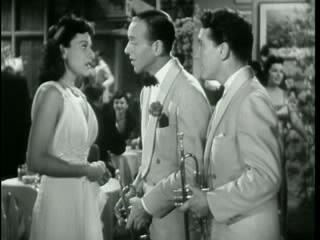
Paulette Goddard, Fred Astaire and Burgess Meredith

- Fred Astaire as Danny O'Neill
- Paulette Goddard as Ellen Miller
- Artie Shaw as himself
- Charles Butterworth as Mr. Chisholm
- Burgess Meredith as Hank Taylor
- Frank Melton as Stu
- Jimmy Conlin as Mr. Dunn
- Don Brodie as clerk
- Marjorie Kane as secretary
- Joan Barclay as receptionist
- Willa Pearl Curtis as scrubwoman
- Billy Butterfield as himself / Shaw's Band Trumpeter
- William Benedict as ticket taker (uncredited)

Cast notes

- Billy Butterfield dubbed Burgess Meredith's trumpet solo.

== Musical numbers ==
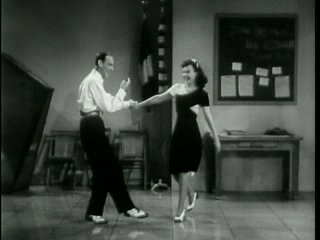
Astaire and Goddard in "I Ain't Hep to That Step But I'll Dig It"

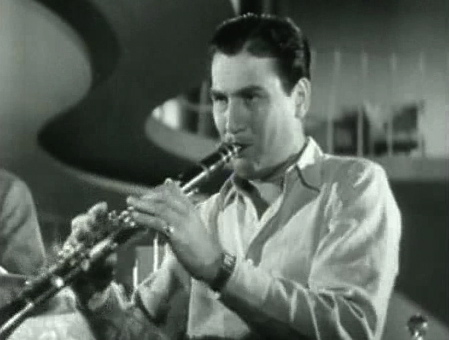
Artie Shaw in the "Concerto for Clarinet"

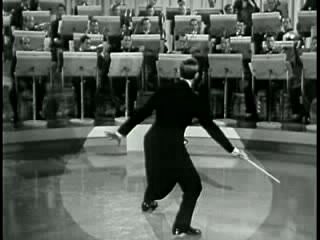
Fred Astaire dance-conducting the Artie Shaw Orchestra

Hermes Pan collaborated with Astaire on the choreography.

- "Sugar": Astaire is shown leading a college band in a jazz standard by Marceo Pinkard. Astaire's trumpet playing is dubbed by Bobby Hackett, while Meredith's is dubbed by Shaw's bandsman Billy Butterfield.
- "Everything's Jumping": A brief number for Artie Shaw and his band.
- "I Ain't Hep to That Step But I'll Dig It": This comic song and dance duet for Astaire and Goddard was, according to Goddard - whose dance ability and experience was limited - done "just once, one Saturday morning ... I'm glad it was all right for I couldn't have done it again". It was the last of Astaire's duets to be filmed entirely in one take. The dance incorporates a new step, the "Dig It" which involved snapping both feet together and then hopping while keeping them together. The rest of the dance involves original use of partnered teetering, scooting and dodging steps with some jitterbugging thrown in. In his first film appearance, Hermes Pan can be seen as the clarinetist in the band (standing farthest back).
- "Sweet Sue": Another Astaire (Hackett) and Meredith (Butterfield) mime routine, this time to a Victor Young standard.
- "Love of My Life": Johnny Mercer and Shaw wrote this song one day over lunch at Mercer's house, and when the excited Shaw wanted to show it to the studio, Mercer persuaded him to wait three weeks explaining: "If you tell them you just wrote it over lunch they won't think it's any good". It is delivered by Astaire to Goddard and garnered an Academy Award nomination for Best Song.
- "Kamarinskaya": A brief comic number for Astaire, who plays a Russian doing a Moiseyev-style dance to the traditional Russian melody while singing a pseudo-Russian version of "Love of My Life" in a thick accent.
- "Poor Mr. Chisholm ": Accompanying himself on the piano Astaire sings this folk-parody Mercer-Henighen number for Shaw's approval.
- "Concerto for Clarinet": Like many jazzmen of his time – Benny Goodman, Paul Whiteman, Jimmy Dorsey and Duke Ellington among them – Shaw occasionally produced pieces with titles more commonly associated with classical music; Shaw, however was characteristically modest about this attractively episodic extended piece, composed especially for the film: "I never intended it for posterity ... It filled a spot in the picture". It features the string section – Shaw's "mice men" as he liked to call them, which he had just added to band – most famously in "Frenesi" - the year before.
- "Hoe Down the Bayou/Poor Mr. Chisholm (dance)": Astaire "conducts" the band while performing a tap solo.

The only number involving Astaire and Pan, the choreographic collaboration responsible for many routines featuring Astaire in the 1930s, was "Me and the Ghost Upstairs", which was cut from the final film but has been included in some home video releases. In it, Pan, shrouded in a sheet, creeps up on Astaire and begins to mimic him in a riotous number involving Lindy lifts and jitterbugging.

== Production ==
In a 1968 interview, Astaire described this effort as "the worst film I ever made." Astaire explained that he was attracted to the film by the opportunity to "dance-conduct this real swingin' outfit". In an interview shortly before his death, Shaw admitted this film put him off acting.

Astaire and Shaw shared a striking series of personality traits in common: an obsessive perfectionism and seemingly endless appetite for retakes, profound musicality and love of jazz, personal modesty and charm, and in a late interview Shaw expressed his opinion of Astaire: "Astaire really sweat - he toiled. He was a humorless Teutonic man, the opposite of his debonair image in top hat and tails. I liked him because he was an entertainer and an artist. There's a distinction between them. An artist is concerned only with what is acceptable to himself, where an entertainer strives to please the public. Astaire did both. Louis Armstrong was another one."

== See also ==
- List of films in the public domain in the United States
