= Top Hat =

1935 film by Mark Sandrich

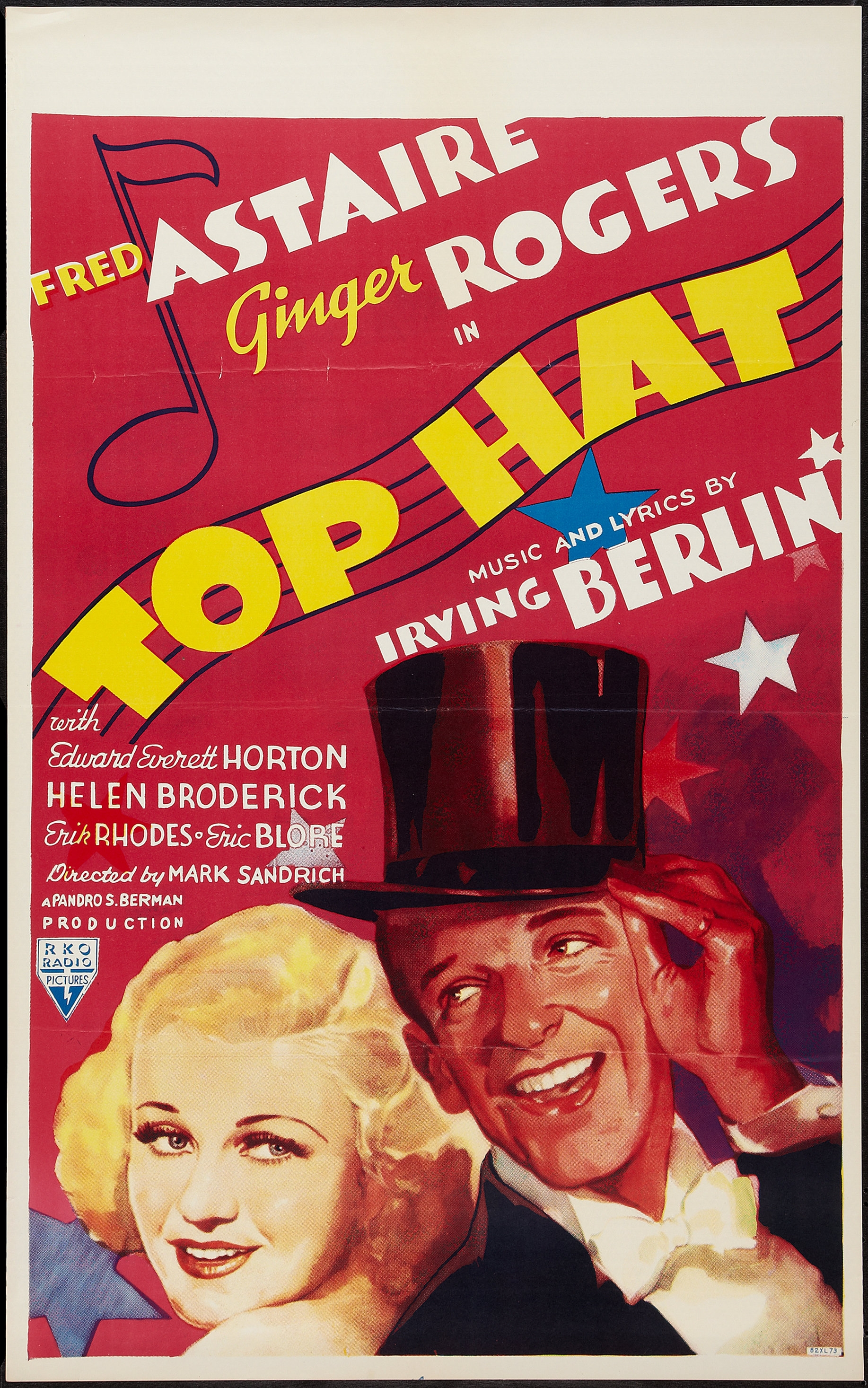
- Theatrical release poster
- Directed by: Mark Sandrich
- Screenplay by: Allan Scott; Dwight Taylor
- Story by: Dwight Taylor
- Based on: A Scandal in Budapest; 1911 play by Alexander Faragó; Aladar Laszlo
- Produced by: Pandro S. Berman
- Starring: Fred Astaire; Ginger Rogers
- Cinematography: David Abel
- Edited by: William Hamilton
- Music by: Irving Berlin
- Production company: RKO Radio Pictures
- Distributed by: RKO Radio Pictures
- Release dates: August 29, 1935 (New York City, premiere)
- Running time: 101 minutes
- Country: United States
- Language: English
- Budget: $609,000
- Box office: $3.2 million

Top Hat is a 1935 American musical comedy film, in which Fred Astaire plays an American tap dancer named Jerry Travers, who arrives in London to star in a show produced by Horace Hardwick (Edward Everett Horton). He meets and attempts to impress Dale Tremont (Ginger Rogers) to win her affection. The film also features Eric Blore as Hardwick's valet Bates, Erik Rhodes as Alberto Beddini, a fashion designer and rival for Dale's affections, and Helen Broderick as Hardwick's long-suffering wife Madge.

The film was directed by Mark Sandrich, and was written by Allan Scott and Dwight Taylor, with songs by Irving Berlin. "Top Hat, White Tie and Tails" and "Cheek to Cheek" have become American song classics. It has been nostalgically referred to—particularly its "Cheek to Cheek" segment—in cinema, including films as diverse as The Purple Rose of Cairo (1985), The Green Mile (1999), and The Boss Baby (2017).

Astaire and Rogers made nine films together at RKO Pictures; the others include The Gay Divorcee (1934), Roberta (1935), Follow the Fleet (1936), Swing Time (1936), Shall We Dance (1937), and Carefree (1938). Top Hat was the most successful picture of Astaire and Rogers' partnership (and Astaire's second most successful picture after Easter Parade), achieving second place in worldwide box-office receipts for 1935. While some dance critics maintain that Swing Time contained a finer set of dances, Top Hat remains, to this day, the partnership's best-known work.

Top Hat was selected for preservation in the United States National Film Registry by the Library of Congress in its second year, 1990, as being "culturally, historically, or aesthetically significant". The film has also been recognized by the American Film Institute on various lists commemorating the best of American cinema; the film appeared on their list of the twenty five greatest film musicals at number 15, and "Cheek to Cheek" appeared on their list of the one hundred greatest songs of American cinema, also at number 15.

== Plot ==
American dancer Jerry Travers comes to London to star in a show produced by the bumbling Horace Hardwick. While practicing a tap dance routine in his hotel bedroom, he awakens Dale Tremont on the floor below. She storms upstairs to complain, whereupon Jerry falls hopelessly in love with her and proceeds to pursue her all over London.

Dale mistakes Jerry for Horace, who is married to her friend Madge. Following the success of Jerry's opening night in London, Jerry follows Dale to Venice, where she is visiting Madge and modelling/promoting the gowns created by Alberto Beddini, a dandified Italian fashion designer with a penchant for malapropisms.

Jerry proposes to Dale, who, while still believing that Jerry is Horace, is disgusted that her friend's husband could behave in such a manner and agrees instead to marry Alberto. Fortunately, Bates, Horace's meddling English valet, disguises himself as a priest and conducts the ceremony; Horace had sent Bates to keep tabs on Dale.

On a trip in a gondola, Jerry manages to convince Dale and they return to the hotel where the previous confusion is rapidly cleared up. The reconciled couple dance off into the Venetian sunset, to the tune of "The Piccolino".

== Cast ==
- Fred Astaire as Jerry Travers
- Ginger Rogers as Dale Tremont
- Edward Everett Horton as Horace Hardwick
- Erik Rhodes as Alberto Beddini
- Helen Broderick as Madge Hardwick
- Eric Blore as Bates
- Lucille Ball as Flower Clerk (uncredited)

== Production ==
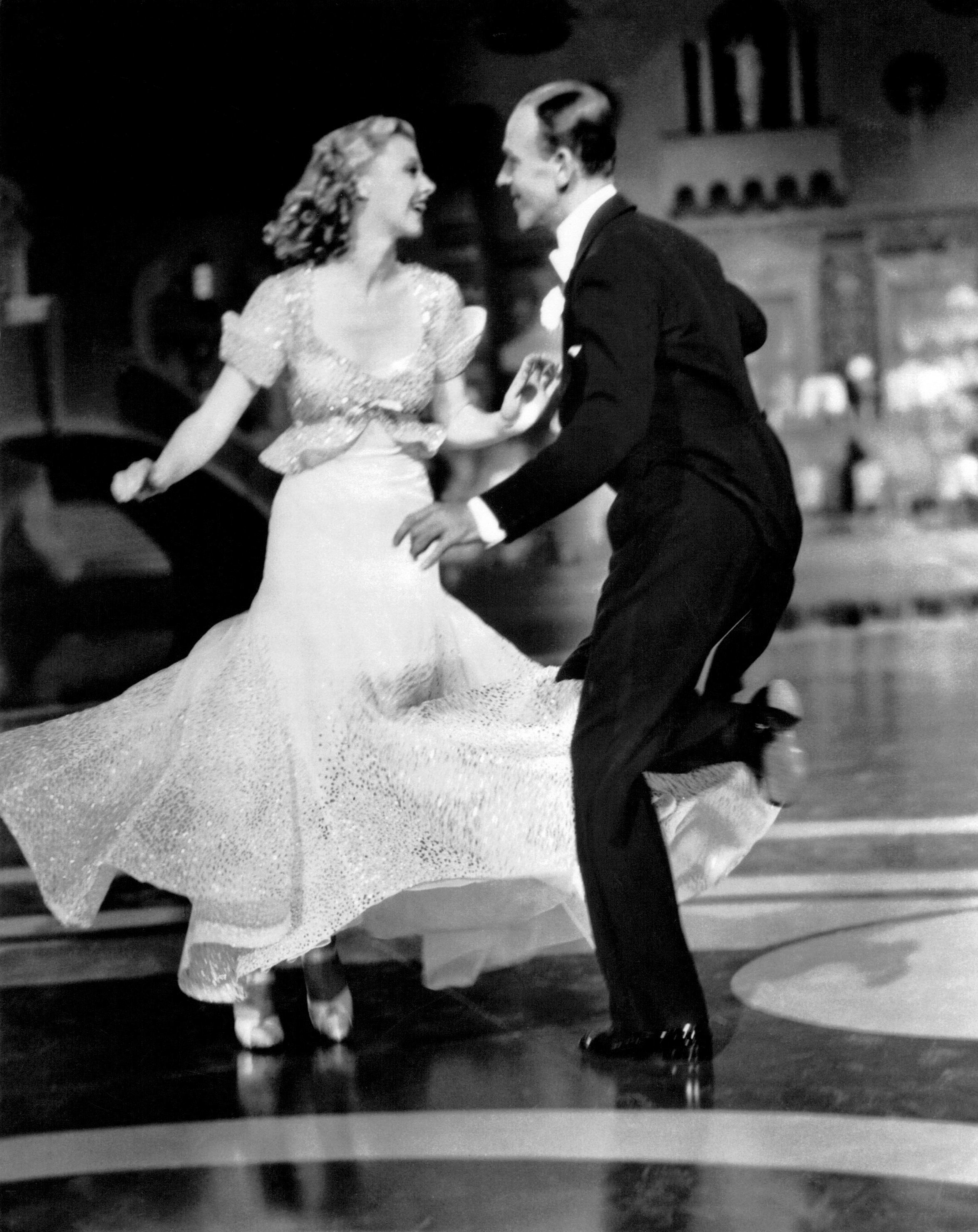
Ginger Rogers and Fred Astaire in Top Hat

External videos
- Top Hat clips at TCM Movie Database

Top Hat began filming on April 1, 1935, and cost $620,000 to make. Shooting ended in June and the first public previews were held in July. These led to cuts of approximately ten minutes, mainly in the last portion of the film: the carnival sequence and the gondola parade which had been filmed to show off the huge set were heavily cut. A further four minutes were cut before its premiere at the Radio City Music Hall, where it broke all records, went on to gross $3 million on its initial release, and became RKO's most profitable film of the 1930s. After Mutiny on the Bounty, it made more money than any other film released in 1935.

=== Script development ===
Dwight Taylor was the principal screenwriter in this, the first screenplay written specially for Astaire and Rogers. Astaire reacted negatively to the first drafts, complaining that "it is patterned too closely after The Gay Divorcee", and "I am cast as ... a sort of objectionable young man without charm or sympathy or humour". Allan Scott, for whom this movie served as his first major project, and who would go on to serve on six of the Astaire-Rogers pictures, was hired by Sandrich to do the rewrites and never actually worked with Taylor, with Sandrich acting as script editor and advisor throughout. Allegedly Ben Holmes, Ralph Spence, and Károly Nóti were further contributors to the script. The story itself was later said to have been inspired by two sources: ''Scandal in Budapest'' by Sándor Faragó, and ''A Girl Who Dares'' by Aladar LaszloIt.

The Hays Office insisted on only minor changes, including probably the most quoted line of dialogue from the film: Beddini's motto "For the women the kiss, for the men the sword", which originally ran "For the men the sword, for the women the whip". Of his role in the creation of Top Hat, Taylor recalled that with Sandrich and Berlin he shared "a kind of childlike excitement. The whole style of the picture can be summed up in the word inconsequentiality. When I left RKO a year later, Mark said to me, 'You will never again see so much of yourself on the screen.'" On the film's release, the script was panned by many critics, who alleged it was merely a rewrite of The Gay Divorcee.

=== Musical score and orchestration ===
This was composer Irving Berlin's first complete film score since 1930 and he negotiated a unique contract, retaining the copyrights to the score with a guarantee of ten percent of the profits if the film earned in excess of $1,250,000. Eight songs from the original score were discarded as they were not considered to advance the film's plot. One of these, "Get Thee Behind Me, Satan", was also used in Follow the Fleet (1936). All five songs eventually selected became major hits and, in the September 28, 1935 broadcast of Your Hit Parade, all five featured in the top fifteen songs selected for that week.

Astaire recalled how this success helped restore Berlin's flagging self-confidence. Astaire had never met Berlin before this film, although he had danced on stage to some of his tunes as early as 1915. There ensued a lifelong friendship with Berlin contributing to more Astaire films (six in total) than any other composer. Of his experience with Astaire in Top Hat Berlin wrote: "He's a real inspiration for a writer. I'd never have written Top Hat without him. He makes you feel so secure."

As Berlin could not read or write music and could only pick out tunes on a specially designed piano that transposed keys automatically, he required an assistant to make up his piano parts. Hal Borne—Astaire's rehearsal pianist—performed this role in Top Hat and recalled working nights with him in the Beverly Wilshire Hotel: "Berlin went 'Heaven...' and I went dah dah dee 'I'm in Heaven' (dah-dah-dee). He said, 'I love it, put it down.'" These parts were subsequently orchestrated by a team comprising Edward Powell, Maurice de Packh, Gene Rose, Eddie Sharp, and Arthur Knowlton who worked under the overall supervision of Max Steiner.

Berlin broke a number of the conventions of American songwriting in this film, especially in the songs "Top Hat, White Tie and Tails" and "Cheek to Cheek". According to Rogers, the film became the talk of Hollywood as a result of its score.

=== Set design ===
In an Astaire-Rogers picture, the Big White Set—as these Art Deco-inspired creations were known—took up the largest share of the film's production costs, and Top Hat was no exception. A winding canal—spanned by two staircase bridges at one end and a flat bridge on the other—was built across two adjoining sound stages. Astaire and Rogers dance across this flat bridge in "Cheek to Cheek". Around the bend from this bridge was located the main piazza, a giant stage coated in red bakelite that was the location for "The Piccolino". This fantasy representation of the Lido of Venice was on three levels comprising dance floors, restaurants and terraces, all decorated in candy-cane colors, with the canal waters dyed black. The vast Venetian interiors were similarly inauthentic, reflecting instead the latest Hollywood tastes.

Carroll Clark, who worked under the general supervision of Van Nest Polglase, was the unit art director on all but one of the Astaire-Rogers films. He managed the team of designers responsible for the scenery and furnishings of Top Hat.

=== Wardrobe: The "feathers" incident ===
Although Bernard Newman was nominally in charge of dressing the stars, Rogers was keenly interested in dress design and make-up. For the "Cheek to Cheek" routine, she was determined to use her own creation: "I was determined to wear this dress, come hell or high water. And why not? It moved beautifully. Obviously, no one in the cast or crew was willing to take sides, particularly not my side. This was all right with me. I'd had to stand alone before. At least my mother was there to support me in the confrontation with the entire front office, plus Fred Astaire and Mark Sandrich."

Due to the enormous labor involved in sewing each ostrich feather to the dress, Astaire—who normally approved his partner's gowns and suggested modifications if necessary during rehearsals—saw the dress for the first time on the day of the shoot, and was horrified at the way it shed clouds of feathers at every twist and turn, recalling later: "It was like a chicken attacked by a coyote, I never saw so many feathers in my life." According to choreographer Hermes Pan, Astaire lost his temper and yelled at Rogers, who promptly burst into tears, whereupon her mother, Lela, "came charging at him like a mother rhinoceros protecting her young." An additional night's work by seamstresses resolved much of the problem; however, careful examination of the dance on film reveals feathers floating around Astaire and Rogers and lying on the dance floor. Later, Astaire and Pan presented Rogers with a gold feather for her charm bracelet, and serenaded her with a ditty parodying Berlin's tune:

Feathers—I hate feathers
And I hate them so that I can hardly speak
And I never find the happiness I seek
With those chicken feathers dancing
Cheek to Cheek

Thereafter, Astaire nicknamed Rogers "Feathers"—also a title of one of the chapters in his autobiography—and parodied his experience in a song and dance routine with Judy Garland in Easter Parade (1948).

Astaire also chose and provided his own clothes. He is widely credited with influencing 20th century male fashion and, according to Forbes male fashion editor, G. Bruce Boyer, the "Isn't It a Lovely Day?" routine: "shows Astaire dressed in the style he would make famous: soft-shouldered tweed sports jacket, button-down shirt, bold striped tie, easy-cut gray flannels, silk paisley pocket square, and suede shoes. It's an extraordinarily contemporary approach to nonchalant elegance, a look Ralph Lauren and a dozen other designers still rely on more than six decades later. Astaire introduced a new style of dress that broke step with the spats, celluloid collars, and homburgs worn by aristocratic European-molded father-figure heroes."

== Musical numbers and choreography ==
The choreography, in which Astaire was assisted by Hermes Pan, is principally concerned throughout with the possibilities of using taps to make as much noise as possible. In the film, Astaire suffers from what Rogers terms an "affliction": "Every once in a while I suddenly find myself dancing." Astaire introduces the film's tap motif when he blasts a tap barrage at the somnolent members of a London Club. There are eight musical numbers.

In the "Opening Sequence", after the RKO logo appears, Astaire, shown only from the waist down, dances onto a polished stage floor, backed by a male chorus sporting canes. On pausing his name appears. Rogers then follows suit and the two dance together as the picture dissolves to reveal a top hat. A similar concept was used in the opening sequence of The Barkleys of Broadway (1949).

The second is "No Strings (I'm Fancy Free)". On retiring to his hotel suite, Horton advises him to get married. Astaire declares his preference for bachelorhood and the song—this number was the brainchild of scriptwriter Dwight Taylor and is found in his earliest drafts—emerges naturally and in mid-sentence. Astaire sings it through twice and during the last phrase leaps into a ballet jump, accompanied by leg beats, and launches into a short solo dance that builds in intensity and volume progressing from tap shuffles sur place, via traveling patterns, to rapid-fire heel jabs finishing with a carefree tour of the suite during which he beats on the furniture with his hands. On his return to the center of the room, where he noisily concentrates his tap barrage, the camera cranes down to discover Rogers in bed, awake and irritated. As she makes her way upstairs, Horton fields telephone complaints from hotel management. Astaire incorporates this into his routine, first startling him with a tap burst then escorting him ostentatiously to the telephone. As Horton leaves to investigate, Astaire continues to hammer his way around the suite, during which he feigns horror at seeing his image in a mirror—a reference to his belief that the camera was never kind to his face. The routine ends as Astaire, now dancing with a statue, is interrupted by Rogers' entrance, a scene which, as in The Gay Divorcee and Roberta, typifies the way in which Astaire inadvertently incurs the hostility of Rogers, only to find her attractive and wear down her resistance.

In "No Strings (reprise)", Rogers, after storming upstairs to complain, returns to her room at which point Astaire, still intent on dancing, nominates himself her "sandman", sprinkling sand from a cigarette receptacle and lulling her, Horton and eventually himself to sleep with a soft and gentle sand dance, to a diminuendo reprise of the melody, in a scene which has drawn considerable admiration from dance commentators, and has been the subject of affectionate screen parodies.

In "Isn't This a Lovely Day (to be Caught in the Rain)", while Rogers is out riding, a thunderstorm breaks and she takes shelter in a bandstand. Astaire follows her and a conversation about clouds and rainfall soon gives way to Astaire's rendering of this, one of Berlin's most prized creations. Astaire sings to Rogers' back, but the audience can see that Rogers' attitude towards him softens during the song, and the purpose of the ensuing dance is for her to communicate this change to her partner. The dance is one of flirtation and, according to Mueller, deploys two choreographic devices common to the classical minuet: sequential imitation (one dancer performs a step and the other responds) and touching. Initially, the imitation is mocking in character, then becomes more of a casual exchange, and ends in a spirit of true cooperation. Until the last thirty seconds of this two and a half minute dance the pair appear to pull back from touching, then with a crook of her elbow Rogers invites Astaire in. The routine, at once comic and romantic, incorporates hopping steps, tap spins with barrages, loping and dragging steps among its many innovative devices. The spirit of equality which pervades the dance is reflected in the masculinity of Rogers' clothes and in the friendly handshake they exchange at the end.

For "Top Hat, White Tie and Tails", probably Astaire's most celebrated tap solo, the idea for the title song came from Astaire who described to Berlin a routine he had created for the 1930 Ziegfeld Broadway flop Smiles called "Say, Young Man of Manhattan", in which he gunned down a chorus of men—which included a young Bob Hope and Larry Adler—with his cane. Berlin duly produced the song from his trunk and the concept of the film was then built around it. In this number Astaire had to compromise on his one-take philosophy, as Sandrich acknowledged: "We went to huge lengths to make the 'Top Hat' number look like one take, but actually it's several." Astaire's remarkable ability to change the tempo within a single dance phrase is extensively featured throughout this routine and taken to extremes—as when he explodes into activity from a pose of complete quiet and vice versa. This routine also marks Astaire's first use of a cane as a prop in one of his filmed dances. The number opens with a chorus strutting and lunging in front of a backdrop of a Parisian street scene. They make way for Astaire who strides confidently to the front of the stage and delivers the song, which features the famous line: "I'm stepping out, my dear, to breathe an atmosphere that simply reeks with class," trading the occasional tap barrage with the chorus as he sings. The dance begins with Astaire and chorus moving in step. Astaire soon lashes out with a swirling tap step and the chorus responds timidly before leaving the stage in a sequence of overlapping, direction-shifting, hitch steps and walks. In the first part of the solo which follows, Astaire embarks on a circular tap movement, embellished with cane taps into which he mixes a series of unpredictable pauses. As the camera retreats the lights dim and, in the misterioso passage which follows, Astaire mimes a series of stances, ranging from overt friendliness, wariness, surprise to watchful readiness and jaunty confidence. Jimmy Cagney attended the shooting of this scene and advised Astaire, who claims to have ad-libbed much of this section. The chorus then returns in a threatening posture, and Astaire proceeds to dispatch them all, using an inventive series of actions miming the cane's use as a gun, a submachine gun, a rifle and, finally, a bow and arrow.

The final supported backbend—Astaire and Rogers in the climax to "Cheek to Cheek"

Astaire's first seduction of Rogers in "Isn't This a Lovely Day" falls foul of the mistaken-identity theme of the plot, so he makes a second attempt, encouraged by Broderick, in the number "Cheek to Cheek". As in "No Strings", the song emerges from Astaire's mid-sentence as he dances with the hesitant Rogers on a crowded floor. Berlin wrote the words and music to this enduring classic in one day, and, at 72 measures, it is the longest song he ever wrote. He was very appreciative of Astaire's treatment of the song: "The melody keeps going up and up. He crept up there. It didn't make a damned bit of difference. He made it." As he navigates through this difficult material, Rogers looks attracted and receptive and, at the end of the song, they dance cheek to cheek across a bridge to a deserted ballroom area nearby. According to Mueller's analysis, the duet that follows—easily the most famous of all the Astaire-Rogers partnered dances—reflects the complexity of the emotional situation in which the pair find themselves. No longer flirting, as in "Isn't This a Lovely Day?", the pair are now in love. But Rogers feels guilty and deceived and would prefer to avoid Astaire's advances—in effect, fall out of love with him. Therefore, Astaire's purpose here is to make her put aside her misgivings (which are a mystery to him) and surrender completely to him. The choreographic device introduced to reflect the progress of this seduction is the supported backbend, exploiting Rogers' exceptionally flexible back. The main dance begins with the first of two brief passages which reuse the device of sequential imitation introduced in "Isn't This a Lovely Day?" The pair spin and lean, dodging back and forth past each other before moving into a standard ballroom position where the first hints of the supported backbend are introduced. The first backbend occurs at the end of a sequence where Astaire sends Rogers into a spin, collects her upstage and maneuvers her into a linked-arm stroll forward, repeats the spin but this time encircles her while she turns and then takes her in his arms. As the music becomes more energetic, the dancers flow across the floor and Rogers, moving against the music, suddenly falls into a deeper backbend, which is then repeated, only deeper still. The music now transitions to a quiet recapitulation of the main melody during which the pair engage in a muted and tender partnering, and here the second passage involving sequential imitation appears. With the music reaching its grand climax Astaire and Rogers rush toward the camera, then away in a series of bold, dramatic manoeuvers culminating in three ballroom lifts which showcase Rogers' dress before abruptly coming to a halt in a final, deepest backbend, maintained as the music approaches its closing bars. They rise, and after a couple of turns dancing cheek to cheek for the first time since the dance began, come to rest next to a wall. Rogers, having conducted the dance in a state of dreamlike abandon now glances uneasily at Astaire before walking away, as if reminded that their relationship cannot proceed.

By now, Rogers has learned Astaire's true identity although neither of them yet know that her impulsive marriage to Rhodes is null and void. Dining together during carnival night in Venice, and to help assuage her guilt, Astaire declares: "Let's eat, drink and be merry, for tomorrow we have to face him", which serves as the cue for the music of "The Piccolino", the film's big production number. A gondola parade is followed by the entry of a dancing chorus who perform a series of ballroom poses and rippling-pattern routines choreographed by Hermes Pan. Berlin, who lavished a great deal of effort on the song designed it as a pastiche of "The Carioca" from Flying Down to Rio (1933) and "The Continental" from The Gay Divorcee (1934), and the lyric communicates its fake origin: "It was written by a Latin/A gondolier who sat in/his home out in Brooklyn/and gazed at the stars." It is a song about a song and Rogers sings it to Astaire after which an off-camera chorus repeats it while the dance ensemble is photographed, Busby Berkeley-style, from above. The camera then switches to Rogers and Astaire who bound down to the stage to perform a two-minute dance—all shot in one take—with the Astaire-Pan choreography separately referencing the basic melody and the Latin vamp in the accompaniment. They dance to the accompaniment as they descend the steps and glide along the dance floor, then, when the melody enters, they halt and perform the Piccolino step, which involves the feet darting out to the side of the body. The rest of the dance involves repetitions and variations of the Piccolino step and the hopping steps associated with the vamp, leading to some complex amalgamations of the two. On the vamp melody's final appearance, the dancers perform a highly embellished form of the Piccolino step as they travel sideways back to their table, sinking back into their chairs and lifting their glasses in a toast.

"The Piccolino (reprise)": After the various parties confront each other in the bridal suite, with Rogers' "marriage" to Rhodes revealed as performed by a fake clergyman, the scene is set for Astaire and Rogers to dance into the sunset, which they duly do, in this fragment of a much longer duet—the original was cut after the July 1935 previews—but not before they parade across the Venetian set and reprise the Piccolino step.

== Release ==
The film opened at Radio City Music Hall in New York in a pre-release engagement on August 29, 1935, before being released throughout the United States the following week.

== Reception ==
=== Box office ===
Top Hat set a house record at Radio City Music Hall with a gross of $134,800 in its first week. Twenty-five policemen were deployed to control the crowds. It also set house records in the opening week at B.F. Keith Memorial Theatre in Boston ($33,000); Hollywood Pantages Theatre ($19,000) and at Hillstreet Theatre in Los Angeles ($17,000). In its 3 weeks at the Music Hall, it grossed $350,000 and was the highest-grossing film in the United States in September. Overall, the film earned rentals of $1,782,000 in the US and Canada and $1,420,000 elsewhere. RKO made a profit of $1,325,000, making it the studio's most profitable film of the 1930s.

It was the fourth most popular film at the British box office in 1935–36.

=== Critical response ===
Reviews for Top Hat were mainly positive. The Los Angeles Evening Herald Express praised the film, exclaiming "Top Hat is the tops! With Fred Astaire dancing and singing Irving Berlin tunes! Well, one (in his right mind) couldn't ask for much more—unless, of course, it could be a couple of encores." The New York Times praised the film's musical numbers, but criticized the storyline, describing it as "a little on the thin side," but also stating that "it is sprightly enough to plug those inevitable gaps between the shimmeringly gay dances. Top Hat is worth standing in line for. From the appearance of the lobby yesterday afternoon, you probably will have to."

Variety also singled out the storyline as well as the cast, stating "the danger sign is in the story and cast. Substitute Alice Brady for Helen Broderick and it's the same lineup of players as was in The Gay Divorcée. Besides which the situations in the two scripts parallel each other closely". Nevertheless, it concluded that Top Hat was a film "one can't miss".

Despite praising the film in general, Roger Ebert went as far as to describe it as having an idiot plot, depending as it does on "a misunderstanding that is all but impossible".

Writing for The Spectator in 1935, Graham Greene gave the film a generally positive review, describing the film as "a vehicle for Fred Astaire's genius", and noting that Astaire's performance eliminated any concern over the fact that "the music and lyrics are bad" or that Astaire "has to act with human beings [who cannot match] his freedom, lightness, and happiness".

As of 2022, the review aggregator website Rotten Tomatoes reported that the film had a 100% "fresh" approval rating based on 38 reviews, with an average rating of 9.0/10. The website's critical consensus reads, "A glamorous and enthralling depression-era diversion, Top Hat is nearly flawless, with acrobatics by Fred Astaire and Ginger Rogers that make the hardest physical stunts seem light as air."

=== Awards and honors ===
The film was nominated for the Oscar for Best Picture, as well as Art Direction (Carroll Clark and Van Nest Polglase), Original Song (Irving Berlin for "Cheek to Cheek"), and Dance Direction (Hermes Pan for "Piccolino" and "Top Hat"). In 1990, Top Hat was selected for preservation in the United States National Film Registry by the Library of Congress as being "culturally, historically, or aesthetically significant". The film ranked number 15 on the 2006 American Film Institute's list of best musicals.

The February 2020 issue of New York Magazine lists Top Hat as among "The Best Movies That Lost Best Picture at the Oscars".

== In popular culture ==
Top Hat has been nostalgically referenced—particularly its "Cheek to Cheek" segment—in many films, including The Purple Rose of Cairo (1985), The Green Mile (1999), Shall We Dance? (2004), Ice Princess (2005), La La Land (2016) and the animated film The Boss Baby (2017). Top Hat's movie poster appeared in Stephen Chow's movie Kung Fu Hustle. British-Irish singer-songwriter Chris de Burgh referenced the movie in his 1986 hit, "The Lady in Red", wherein he and the eponymous lady in the song danced "Cheek to Cheek".

The film is the namesake for the seventh episode of the DC Studios miniseries The Penguin, a spin-off of the 2022 film The Batman. In the episode, a young Oz Cobb and his mother Francis watch the film in a flashback. In the present, Francis is kidnapped by Oz's rival Sofia Gigante, who she tells that she believes Oz will kill her, and when he does, "[she'll] be tap dancing on [her] grave like Ginger fuckin' Rogers".

== Stage adaptation ==
The film has been adapted into a stage musical that began touring the UK during late 2011. The cast included Summer Strallen as Dale, Tom Chambers as Jerry and Martin Ball as Horace. The show opened at Milton Keynes Theatre on August 19, 2011, before touring to other UK regional theatres including Leeds, Birmingham and Edinburgh. The production transferred to the West End's Aldwych Theatre on April 19, 2012, opening on May 9, 2012. It won three Olivier Awards in 2013, including for Best New Musical.

== Home media ==
In 2003, a digitally restored version of Top Hat was released separately, and as part of The Fred and Ginger Collection, Vol. 1 from Universal Studios, which controls the rights to the RKO Astaire-Rogers pictures in the UK. In both releases, the film features an introduction by Ava Astaire McKenzie.

In 2005, a digitally restored version of Top Hat, different from the Region 2 restoration, was released on Region 1 DVD separately and as part of The Astaire & Rogers Collection, Vol.1 from Warner Home Video. In both cases, the film features a commentary by Astaire's daughter, Ava Astaire McKenzie, and Larry Billman, author of Fred Astaire, a Bio-bibliography.

== See also ==
- List of cult films
- List of films with a 100% rating on Rotten Tomatoes, a film review aggregator website
