= No Strings (I'm Fancy Free) =

1935 song by Fred Astaire

Song by Fred Astaire with Leo Reisman's Orchestra
- B-side: "Cheek To Cheek"
- Published: 1935 Berlin Irving Music Corp
- Released: August 1935
- Recorded: June 26, 1935
- Studio: ARC Studios, New York City
- Genre: Jazz, Pop Vocal
- Label: Brunswick 7486
- Songwriter: Irving Berlin

Fred Astaire with Leo Reisman's Orchestra singles chronology
"Night And Day / Stormy Weather Victor 1932 re-releases" (1934)	"No Strings (I'm Fancy Free)" (1935)	"Isn't This A Lovely Day" (1935)

"No Strings (I'm Fancy Free)" is a popular song written by Irving Berlin for the 1935 film Top Hat, where it was introduced by Fred Astaire. In the film, the character played by Astaire is advised to get married and Astaire responds by saying he prefers to remain as a bachelor and he launches into this song and a major dance routine.(Top Hat#Musical numbers and choreography)

== Lyrics ==
In me, you see a youth
Who is completely on the loose
No yens, no yearnings

No strings and no connections
No ties to my affections
I'm fancy free and free for anything fancy

No dates that can't be broken
No words that can't be spoken
Especially when I am feeling romancy

Like a robin upon a tree
Like a sailor that goes to sea
Like an unwritten melody
I'm free, that's me

So bring on the big attraction
My decks are cleared for action
I'm fancy free and free for anything fancy

An alternative opening verse, used by Ella Fitzgerald (and by Astaire on Brunswick recording 7486) is as follows:

I wake up every morning with a smile on my face
Everything in its place as it should be
I start out every morning just as free as the breeze
My cares upon the shelf
Because I find myself with

== Notable recordings ==
- Fred Astaire's 1935 recording for Brunswick (catalog No. 7486) was popular that year and Astaire recorded it again in 1952 for his album The Astaire Story.
- Ramona, Ramona and Her Grand Piano, recorded 9/13/1935.
- Ella Fitzgerald - Ella Fitzgerald Sings the Irving Berlin Songbook (1958)
