= Top Hat, White Tie and Tails =

1935 song by Fred Astaire

Song by Fred Astaire with Johnny Greene's Orchestra
- B-side: "Isn't This A Lovely Day"
- Published: 1935 Berlin Irving Music Corp
- Released: August 1935
- Recorded: June 27, 1935
- Studio: ARC Studios, New York City
- Genre: Jazz, Pop Vocal
- Label: Brunswick 7487
- Songwriter: Irving Berlin

Fred Astaire with Johnny Greene's Orchestra singles chronology
"Cheek To Cheek" (1935)	"Top Hat, White Tie and Tails" (1935)	"Let's Face The Music And Dance" (1936)

"Top Hat, White Tie and Tails" is a popular song written by Irving Berlin for the 1935 film Top Hat, where it was introduced by Fred Astaire.

The song title refers to the formal wear required on a party invitation: top hat, white tie, and a tailcoat. Popular recordings in 1935 were by Fred Astaire and by Ray Noble and his Orchestra (vocal by Al Bowlly and The Freshmen).

== Other notable recordings ==
- The Boswell Sisters recorded the song on October 8, 1935 for Decca Records.
- Carroll Gibbons with the Savoy Orpheans (1935)
- Fred Astaire included the song in the album The Astaire Story (1952)
- Mel Tormé included the song in the album Mel Tormé Sings Fred Astaire (1956)
- Louis Armstrong - for his album Louis Under the Stars (1958)
- Ella Fitzgerald – Ella Fitzgerald Sings the Irving Berlin Songbook (1958)
- Fred Astaire recorded the song again in 1975 and it can be found on the album The Complete London Sessions.
- Tony Bennett - Steppin' Out (1993)
- Cherry Poppin' Daddies – The Boop-A-Doo (2016)

== Other appearances ==
- The popular Norwegian meteorologist Kristian Trægde sang the song (and step-danced to it) on the TV show Skjemtegauken, in 1968.
- In 1977 ballet dancer Rudolf Nureyev sang the song on The Muppet Show, complete with tap dancing.
- In Episode 1 of the ninth season of M*A*S*H, "The Best of Enemies", the character Hawykeye is singing "Top Hat, White Tie, and Tails" in the first scene.
- In a 1981 SCTV television skit, "Al's Sanitone Drycleaning", Eugene Levy sings the song and tap dances as he promotes the fictional company in a mock commercial.
- In the 1995 film Batman Forever, the character Edward Nygma sings a brief parody of "Top Hat, White Tie, and Tails" using the lyrics "I'm, sucking up your I.Q., vacuuming your cortex, feeding off your brain!"
- Jim Carrey also parodied the song at the 69th Academy Awards when referring to Dirt Devil vacuum commercials featuring Fred Astaire footage: "I'm, sucking up the lint balls, getting in the corners, dump it out the back!"
