= Cheek to Cheek =

1935 classic by Fred Astaire

- Astaire and Ginger Rogers dancing in Swing Time, 1936

Song by Fred Astaire with Leo Reisman's Orchestra
- B-side: "No Strings (I'm Fancy Free)"
- Published: July 2, 1935 by Irving Berlin, Inc., New York
- Released: August 1935
- Recorded: June 26, 1935
- Studio: ARC Recording Studios, 1776 Broadway, New York City
- Genre: Jazz, Pop Vocal
- Length: 3:19
- Label: Brunswick 7486
- Songwriter: Irving Berlin

Fred Astaire with Leo Reisman's Orchestra singles chronology
"Flying Down to Rio" (1934)	"Cheek to Cheek" (1935)	"Isn't This a Lovely Day?" (1935)

"Cheek to Cheek" is a song written by Irving Berlin in 1934–35, specifically for Fred Astaire, the star of his new musical, Top Hat, co-starring Ginger Rogers. In the movie, Astaire sings the song to Rogers as they dance. The song was nominated for the Best Song Oscar for 1936, which it lost to "Lullaby of Broadway". The song spent five weeks at #1 on Your Hit Parade and was named the #1 song of 1935. Astaire's 1935 recording with the Leo Reisman Orchestra was inducted into the Grammy Hall of Fame in 2000. In 2004, Astaire's version finished at No. 15 on AFI's 100 Years...100 Songs survey of top tunes in American cinema. In June 2026, CBS News included the song in its list of the 250 essential American songs of the past 250 years.

== Composition & Release ==
The song was composed by Irving Berlin, with a melody drawing similarity to the theme of Chopin's Polonaise héroïque, itself inspired by the Polish folk dance.

On June 26, 1935, Fred and Leo Reisman, along with his Orchestra, worked at ARC (parent company of Brunswick Records at the time) Studios in New York City. They recorded two Irving Berlin compositions, "Cheek To Cheek" and "No Strings (I'm Fancy Free)". The next day, with Johnny Greene's Orchestra, "Isn't This a Lovely Day?" and "Top Hat, White Tie and Tails" were completed. Both singles were released in August, and then at the end of the month, "Top Hat" premiered. "Cheek to Cheek" headed straight to #1, where it stayed for eleven weeks, and finished the #1 hit of 1935. Fred Astaire topped his career high of ten weeks for "Night And Day".

== Recorded versions ==
According to the database of secondhandsongs.com, "Cheek to Cheek" has been recorded by 438 different artists as of July 2021.

Release	Performer	Vocalist	Recording date	Album	Label	Source
1935	Guy Lombardo	Guy Lombardo				
1935	The Boswell Sisters	The Boswell Sisters				
1956	Ella Fitzgerald & Louis Armstrong	Ella & Louis	August 16, 1956	Ella and Louis	Verve	
1956	Vic Damone	Vic Damone	1956	That Towering Feeling!	Columbia	
1957	Lou Donaldson feat. Horace Silver Quartet	instrumental	June 20, 1952	Quartet/Quintet/Sextet	Blue Note	
1957	Marcy Lutes (arr. Gil Evans)	Marcy Lutes	1956 or 1957	Debut	Decca	
1958	Peggy Lee	Peggy Lee	January 3, 1958	Jump for Joy	Capitol	
1958	Doris Day	Doris Day	February 24, 1958	Hooray for Hollywood	Columbia	
1958	Ella Fitzgerald	Ella Fitzgerald	March 1958	Ella Fitzgerald Sings the Irving Berlin Song Book	Verve	
1958	Billie Holiday	Billie Holiday	August 1956	All or Nothing at All	Verve	
1959	Frank Sinatra	Frank Sinatra	December 1958	Come Dance with Me!	Capitol	
1976	Alex Harvey	Alex Harvey	Christmas 1975	The Penthouse Tapes	Vertigo	
1982	Taco	Taco	1981	After Eight	RCA Victor	
2014	Tony Bennett & Lady Gaga	Tony Bennett & Lady Gaga	June 2013	Cheek to Cheek	Columbia	
