= Dawn Hudson =

American business executive (born 1956)

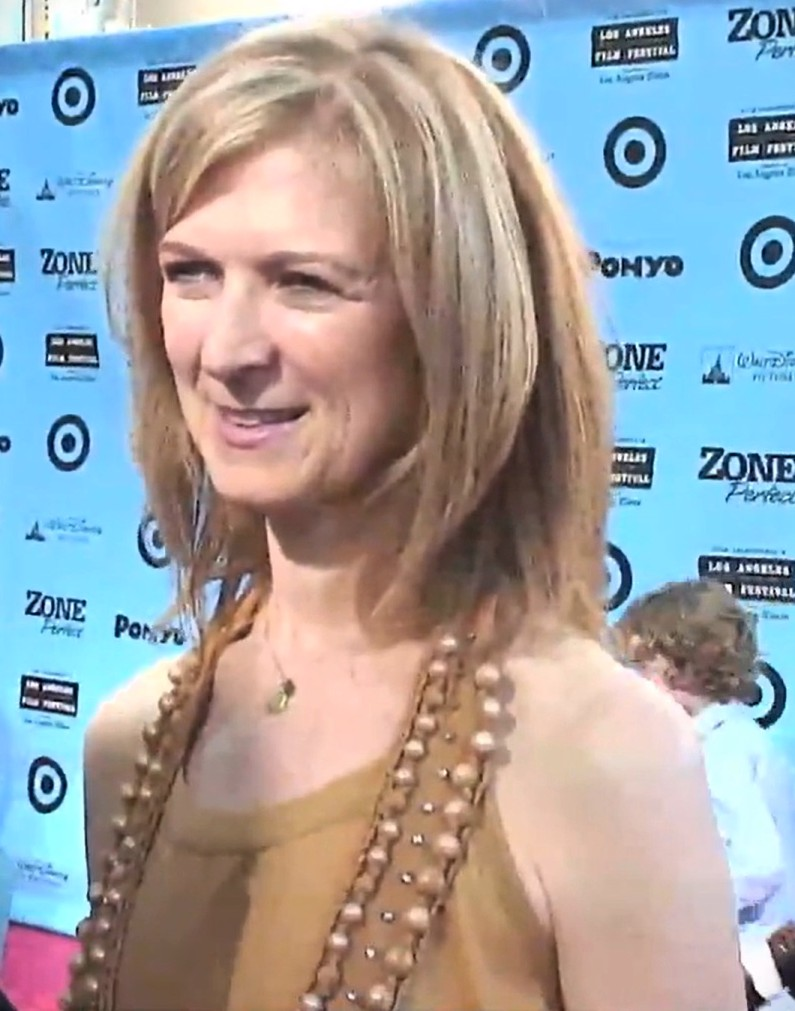
- Hudson in 2009
- Born: January 4, 1956 (age 70); Hot Springs, Arkansas, U.S.
- Education: Harvard University; Washington University in St. Louis; Grenoble Institute of Political Studies; Antioch University Los Angeles
- Occupation: Film industry executive
- Known for: CEO of the Academy of Motion Picture Arts and Sciences (2011-2022)

Dawn Hudson (born January 4, 1956) is an American film industry executive. She was chief executive officer (CEO) of the Academy of Motion Picture Arts and Sciences from 2011 to 2022. Earlier in her career, she was executive director of Film Independent.

== Early life and education ==
Dawn Hudson was born in 1956 in Hot Springs, Arkansas. She graduated from Hot Springs High School in 1973. She went on to attend Harvard University, where she studied government.

She attended graduate school at Washington University in St. Louis and the Grenoble Institute of Political Studies in Grenoble, France. She has an M.F.A. in Creative Writing from Antioch University Los Angeles.

== Career ==
Early in her career, Hudson was the editor-in-chief of St. Louis magazine, acted in several film and television roles, and was a freelance writer. She left St. Louis in 1989 to move to Los Angeles.

=== Film Independent (1991-2011) ===
Hudson was the executive director of Film Independent for twenty years, which she helped to build from a small non-profit to a widely respected viable arts institution. Under her leadership, Film Independent developed a sustaining program of workshops for independent filmmakers from all backgrounds. She also helped expand the organization's membership, produced the Spirit Awards, and the Los Angeles Film Festival.

=== CEO of the Academy of Motion Picture Arts and Science (2011-2022) ===
In 2011, Hudson became the first person to hold the role of chief executive officer at the Academy of Motion Picture Arts and Sciences. As CEO, Dawn Hudson oversaw the academy's 450-person staff in Los Angeles, New York, and London, as well as operations, awards (including the Oscars), membership, marketing, communications, finance, technology, and the Academy Foundation. The Foundation includes educational initiatives, fellowships and grants, the Margaret Herrick Library and the Academy Film Archive.

From the beginning of her tenure in 2011, Hudson led the development and creation of the Academy Museum of Motion Pictures, a 300,000 square-foot museum designed by Pritzker Prize-winning architect Renzo Piano. The Academy Museum features 50,000 square feet of exhibition space and two state-of-the-art theaters (the 1,000-seat David Geffen Theater and the 288-seat Ted Mann Theater). The museum opened to the public in September 2021 and is the largest museum in the United States devoted to the arts and sciences of moviemaking. Hudson was a member of the Academy Museum of Motion Pictures Board of Trustees.

With Hudson at the helm building and overseeing its financial assets, the academy's assets more than tripled from $258 million to $894 million. In addition to the Oscars, the academy became more accessible to its members and people around the world through the modernization of its infrastructure and online outreach. Hudson prioritized developments in technology and the modernization of its infrastructure which enabled greater global outreach, increased member communications and events, online voting, and streaming on the academy's proprietary streaming service, the Academy Screening Room, as well as an exponentially expanded social media presence.

Since the beginning of her tenure at the academy, Hudson drove significant representation, inclusion, and equity initiatives across Academy membership, governance, and staff. As a result, the academy grew into an increasingly diverse, global community of artists and filmmakers. Under Hudson, the academy exceeded its initial goals for increasing representation in membership by 2020. Hudson said of the expansion of the Academy:

"Everyone in this institution understands the legacy of the Oscar. The academy grew up around a cozy club that was the center of the universe, and it was wonderful — if you were part of that club. We are still an exclusive club, we’re just not an exclusionary club.”

Following this success, the academy launched Aperture 2025, establishing inclusion standards for Oscars® eligibility to further the academy's efforts to advance representation in the entertainment industry.

She was succeeded by current chief executive officer Bill Kramer in June 2022.

== Recognition ==
She was named to The Hollywood Reporter's Women in Entertainment Power 100 in 2015.Variety honored Hudson's efforts in its 2021 Women's Impact Report. In 2020, she was listed on The Wrap's inaugural "ChangeMakers List: Women Who Saved Entertainment.

At the 2022 Cannes Film Festival, Hudson was inducted as Officier de L'Ordre des Arts et des Lettres, awarded by the Minister of Culture of the French Republic to those who have distinguished themselves by their contributions to the arts in France and around the world.
