= A Great Day in Harlem =

1958 photograph by Art Kane

Coordinates: 40°48′25″N 73°56′27″W

A Great Day in Harlem

A Great Day in Harlem or Harlem 1958 is a black-and-white photograph of 57 jazz musicians in Harlem, New York, taken by freelance photographer Art Kane for Esquire magazine on August 12, 1958. The idea for the photo came from Esquire's art director, Robert Benton, rather than Kane. However, after being given the commission, it seems that Kane was responsible for choosing the location for the shoot. The subjects are shown at 17 East 126th Street, (Note: Kane also used number 52 as a backdrop.) between Fifth and Madison Avenue, where police had temporarily blocked off traffic. Published as the centerfold of the January 1959 ("Golden Age of Jazz") issue of Esquire, the image was captured with a Hasselblad camera, and earned Kane his first Art Directors Club of New York gold medal for photography. It has been called "the most iconic photograph in jazz history," and is a credited artistic inspiration that led to Gordon Parks' 1998 XXL-commissioned "A Great Day in Hip Hop" homage to Harlem, forty years later, and Patrick Nichols' subsequent 2024 AGO-commissioned Canadian spinoff, "A Great Day in Toronto Hip Hop."

The scene portrayed through Kane's photograph is something of an anachronism, as by 1957 Harlem was no longer the "hotbed" of jazz it had been in the 1940s, and had "forfeited its place in sun" to 52nd Street in Midtown Manhattan. Many musicians who were formerly resident in the area had already moved to middle-class parts of New York, or did so shortly thereafter. Kane himself was not that certain who would turn up on the day, as Esquire staff had merely issued a general invitation through the local musicians' union, recording studios, music writers, and nightclub owners.

In 2018, a book was published to mark the 60th anniversary of the event, with forewords by Quincy Jones and Benny Golson, (Note: By this point, Golson and Sonny Rollins were the only surviving participants (excluding children).) and an introduction by Kane's son, Jonathan.

Sonny Rollins was the last survivor among the adult musicians featured in the photograph, prior to his death in May 2026. Interviewed for a December 2024 article in The New York Times, Rollins gave his view of the photograph's significance at that time, when racism and segregation were pervasive: "It just seemed like we weren't appreciated ... mainly because jazz was a Black art. I think that picture humanized a lot of the myth of what people thought jazz was."

== Musicians in the photograph ==
- Red Allen
- Buster Bailey
- Count Basie
- Emmett Berry
- Art Blakey
- Lawrence Brown
- Scoville Browne
- Buck Clayton
- Bill Crump
- Vic Dickenson
- Roy Eldridge
- Art Farmer
- Bud Freeman
- Dizzy Gillespie
- Tyree Glenn
- Benny Golson
- Sonny Greer
- Johnny Griffin
- Gigi Gryce
- Coleman Hawkins
- J. C. Heard
- Jay C. Higginbotham
- Milt Hinton
- Chubby Jackson
- Hilton Jefferson
- Osie Johnson
- Hank Jones
- Jo Jones
- Jimmy Jones
- Taft Jordan
- Max Kaminsky
- Gene Krupa
- Eddie Locke
- Marian McPartland
- Charles Mingus
- Miff Mole
- Thelonious Monk
- Gerry Mulligan
- Oscar Pettiford
- Rudy Powell
- Luckey Roberts
- Sonny Rollins
- Jimmy Rushing
- Pee Wee Russell
- Sahib Shihab
- Horace Silver
- Zutty Singleton
- Stuff Smith
- Rex Stewart
- Maxine Sullivan
- Joe Thomas
- Wilbur Ware
- Dicky Wells
- George Wettling
- Ernie Wilkins
- Mary Lou Williams
- Lester Young

== Children in the picture ==
Count Basie, having grown tired of standing, sat down on the curb, and gradually a dozen children followed. Most of the children were neighborhood residents, although the second child from the right, Taft Jordan Jr., had accompanied his father, Taft Jordan, to the photo session. The photography crew was already having trouble directing the adults, and the presence of the children added to the chaos: one of the children appearing in the window kept yelling at a sibling on the curb; another kept playing with Basie's hat; Taft Jordan Jr. had been scuffling with the older child seated to his left. Ultimately, Art Kane realized that any further attempt to organize the proceedings would be futile, and he decided to incorporate the subjects' actions.

== Musicians not in the main photograph ==
Notable absentees were Louis Armstrong, John Coltrane, and Miles Davis (all touring), Duke Ellington (in Milwaukee), Benny Goodman (in Los Angeles), and Ella Fitzgerald (recording in Chicago). In 2018, Downbeat magazine writer John McDonough observed that Ruby Braff, Billie Holiday, and Ben Webster were also not present.

Willie "The Lion" Smith had sat down to rest on a nearby stoop when the photo chosen for publication was taken, but appears in unused frames.

Ronnie Free, Mose Allison and Charlie Rouse arrived too late to participate in the Esquire shoot, but they were photographed by Dizzy Gillespie alongside Mary Lou Williams, Lester Young and Oscar Pettiford.

== Film ==
Jean Bach, a radio producer of New York, recounted the story behind the photograph in her 1994 documentary film, A Great Day in Harlem. This incorporated 8 mm film footage taken by bassist Milt Hinton on the day of the shoot. The film was nominated in 1995 for an Academy Award for Documentary Feature. Bach described how, upon the film's release, a number of similar photographs employed the "A Great Day in..." theme. Hugh Hefner assembled Hollywood-area musicians for "A Great Day in Hollywood" in conjunction with a sneak preview of A Great Day in Harlem. Soon afterwards, "A Great Day in Philadelphia" included musicians such as Jimmy Heath, Benny Golson and Ray Bryant. During the filming of Kansas City (1996), musicians including Jay McShann posed for "A Great Day in Kansas City". A multi-page supplement in The Star-Ledger featured "A Great Day in Jersey", while a Dutch photograph was titled "A Great Day in Ha(a)rlem". In 1998, "Great Day in St Paul" was taken by Byron Nelson.

The trend spread to other styles of music, with Houston blues musicians posing for "A Great Day in Houston". "A Great Day in Hip Hop" was followed by XXL's "The Greatest Day in Hip Hop". An Atlanta radio station gathered musicians for "A Great Day in Doo-Wop". A New York cellist, inspired by both the original photograph and the film, assembled chamber musicians for "A Great Day in New York". The New York Post ran "A Great Day in Spanish Harlem".

The photograph was a key plot point in Steven Spielberg's 2004 film The Terminal. The film starred Tom Hanks as Viktor Navorski, a character who comes to the United States in search of Benny Golson's autograph, with which he can complete his deceased father's collection of autographs from the musicians pictured in the photo. Golson himself made a cameo appearance in the film.

== Homages ==
- 1996: A great day in Ha(a)rlem: 76 Dutch jazz musicians gathered on the steps of Haarlem City Hall for a shoot by Anton Corbijn, an initiative by Stichting Jazz in Nederland (SJIN) which newspaper de Volkskrant subsequently published with said byline.
- 1998: A Great Day in Hip Hop: for this photograph by Gordon Parks, commissioned by XXL magazine, 177 hip-hop artists gathered on the stoop of number 17 as well as those of the buildings on either side.
- 2004: A Great Day in London: in an initiative inspired by Art Kane's photograph, 50 writers of Caribbean, Asian and African descent making a significant contribution to contemporary British literature gathered to be photographed on the steps of the British Museum in London.
- 2005: A Great Day in Atlanta: Taken by Amanda Marsalis and commissioned by MTV, more than 50 members of Atlanta's hip hop scene gathered at the Jeremiah S. Gilbert House to recreate Art Kane's photograph.
- 2007: A Great Day on Eldridge St.: inspired by Kane's photograph, Yale Strom corralled a score of leading klezmer musicians who gathered on the steps of the Eldridge St. Synagogue to commemorate the 30 years of the klezmer revival.
- 2008: A Great Day in Paris: more than 50 musicians from the US who were then residing in Paris, France, took part in a historic photo session. The project was initiated by Ricky Ford, who has said: "2008 was the 50th anniversary of the photo A Great Day in Harlem that Art Kane had taken in 1958 of all those jazz musicians in Harlem. I thought it would be a good idea to do the same thing with the American jazz musicians that lived in France. It took a year to prepare. Musicians from all over France came. Philippe Lévy-Stab took a group photo on the steps of Montmartre and Michka Saäl started to work on a documentary film of those musicians."
- 2008: A Great Day in Hoxton: a photograph by Peter Williams, commissioned by Straight No Chaser magazine and featuring prominent music business faces such as Gilles Peterson and James Lavelle alongside designers, fashion professionals, writers, dancers and fellow photographers.
- 2013: Een Grootse Dag in Kootwijk: in the spirit of XXL's picture A Great Day in Hip Hop, Ghamte Schmidt and Andreas van de Laar gathered the Dutch hip hop scene at the monumental Radio Kootwijk for a group portrait.
- 2016: A Great Day in Hackney: in the spirit of Art Kane's photograph, British jazz musicians assembled to celebrate the 30th anniversary of The Premises Studios in Hackney.
- 2018: A Great Day in Hollywood: 47 black writers, showrunners, actors, and producers from more than 20 Netflix original shows, films and documentaries came together to create "A Great Day in Hollywood". Taken to promote Netflix's Strong Black Lead initiative, Netflix also released a minute long video directed by Lacey Duke and narrated by Caleb McLaughlin (Stranger Things).
- 2021: A Great Day in Roxbury's Highland Park: Organized by Mark Schafer, Paige Cook, and JD Garcia, with support from the Unitarian Universalist Urban Ministry (UUUM), the Roxbury Historical Society, and Historic Boston, Inc., 77 elders of the historically Black neighborhood of Highland Park in Roxbury, Massachusetts gathered on the stairs of two local brownstone buildings on the morning of November 6, 2021, for a photo that was taken by Roxbury photographer Hakim Raquib. A half-hour documentary on the making of the "A Great Day in Roxbury's Highland Park" photograph, by Bithyah Israel and commissioned by the UUUM, was premiered at Paige Academy in Roxbury on November 13, 2022.
- 2022: A Great Day in Animation: 54 Black animation professionals, taken by Randy Shropshire with Jeff Vespa as production lead. The idea for the photo came from Marlon West.
- 2025: The jazz ensemble Knats, from Newcastle upon Tyne, England, used an homage to the photo for the cover art for their second album A Great Day in Newcastle.

== See also ==
- Girls in the Windows
