= Domela =

Domela is a surname. Notable people with the surname include:

- César Domela (1900–1992), Dutch sculptor, painter, photographer, typographer, and key member of the De Stijl movement
- Ferdinand Domela Nieuwenhuis (1846–1919), the Netherlands' first prominent socialist
- Harry Domela (1905–1978), Latvian-born German impostor who pretended to be a deposed German crown prince
- Jan Domela (1894–1973), Dutch-born American artist and illustrator
