= 1939 Academy Awards =

1939 Academy Awards may refer to:

- 11th Academy Awards, the Academy Awards ceremony that took place in 1939
- 12th Academy Awards, the 1940 ceremony honoring the best in film for 1939
