= A Great Day in Harlem (film) =

1994 film

- DVD Cover
- Directed by: Jean Bach
- Written by: Jean Bach; Susan Peehl; Matthew Seig
- Produced by: Stuart Samuels; Terrell Braly; Matthew Seig
- Starring: Quincy Jones; Dizzy Gillespie; Sonny Rollins; Buck Clayton
- Narrated by: Quincy Jones
- Cinematography: Steve Petropoulos
- Edited by: Susan Peehl
- Distributed by: Castle Hill Productions
- Release date: September 27, 1994
- Running time: 60 minutes
- Country: United States
- Language: English

A Great Day in Harlem is a 1994 American documentary film directed by Jean Bach about the photograph of the same name. It was nominated for an Academy Award for Best Documentary Feature.

== Production ==
Director Jean Bach acquired an original home movie showing the 1958 photo shoot from musician Milt Hinton. She used Hinton's home video as the basis for her hour-long documentary.

== Reception and legacy ==
In a piece published in The New Yorker, jazz critic Whitney Balliett praised Bach's film as "a brilliant, funny, moving, altogether miraculous documentary."

Jean Bach described how, upon the film's release, a number of similar photographs employed "A Great Day in..." theme. Hugh Hefner assembled Hollywood-area musicians for "A Great Day in Hollywood" in conjunction with a sneak preview of A Great Day in Harlem. Soon after, "A Great Day in Philadelphia" included musicians such as Jimmy Heath, Benny Golson and Ray Bryant. During the filming of Kansas City, musicians including Jay McShann posed for "A Great Day in Kansas City." A multi-page supplement in The Star-Ledger featured "A Great Day in Jersey," while a Dutch photograph was titled "A Great Day in Haarlem."

The trend spread to other styles of music, with Houston blues musicians posing for "A Great Day in Houston." "A Great Day in Hip Hop" was followed by XXL's "The Greatest Day in Hip Hop." An Atlanta radio station gathered musicians for "A Great Day in Doo-Wop." A New York cellist, inspired by both the original photograph and the film, assembled chamber musicians for "A Great Day in New York." The New York Post ran "A Great Day in Spanish Harlem."

By 2004, The New York Times was referring to the original photograph as A Great Day in Harlem.

On review aggregator website Rotten Tomatoes, the film holds an approval rating of 89% based on 13 reviews, with an average rating of 8.0/10.
