= Bill Crump (musician) =

American jazz musician

William John Crump (November 2, 1907 – October 26, 1979) was an American jazz musician, who played alto and tenor saxophone, clarinet, flute, and oboe. He is remembered today mainly as one of the 57 musicians pictured in Art Kane's 1958 photograph A Great Day in Harlem, which appeared in the January 1959 issue of Esquire magazine. At the time, Crump was playing in house bands at the Apollo Theater and Savoy Ballroom in Harlem, New York.

== Biography ==
Crump was born in Oskaloosa, Iowa, on November 2, 1907, and spent his teenage years in Davenport. In 1927, he was playing lead saxophone with a band called The Virginia Ravens, when Eddie Barefield joined it in Geneseo, Illinois, and was apparently still traveling with them in 1930.

In the mid-1930s, Crump was a member of J. Frank Terry's touring band, the Chicago Nightingales, which included trumpeters Dick Vance and Francis Williams (in whose truck the band covered 50,000 miles over a six-month period during 1934). At around this time, he settled in Buffalo, New York, where he played at the numerous local venues where swing music was featured.

In 1947, it was reported that the "Bill Crump Band ha[d] moved into the Heatwave, Buffalo", suggesting a residency at the club. Ten years on, but in the same city, Crump was leading a quartet called the Los Chamacos Group at the Latonas (formerly the Copa Casino). A music journalist observed that the ensemble had "a lot of personality to keep you watching with your ears open", and also noted that in his career, Crump had worked with musicians such as Sarah Vaughan, Al Hibbler, Eartha Kitt, Joyce Bryant, "Dinah", (Note: Since the writer does not give the artist's surname, it is unclear to whom they were referring (but possibly either Dinah Shore or Dinah Washington).) and also Sammy Davis Jr.

Crump was active in the Buffalo branch ("local 533") of the Colored Musicians Union, (Note: Until 1969, Buffalo had separate unions for black and white musicians.) of which he was vice-president from 1949 to 1952. He was also a member of the historic Colored Musicians Club. In a 1994 interview, contemporary Conrad Toepfer Jr. recalled that "[t]here was so much talent at The Club. I mean guys like Bob (Note: Bob was Bill's brother.) and Bill Crump. Bill Crump had worked, with the Count Basie Band".

In later life, Crump played for various Las Vegas shows. In 1976, he moved with his wife Marie to Los Angeles, where he is known to have played some gigs with Streamline Ewing and Jimmy Cheatham.
