= Joseph A. Ball (inventor) =

American inventor (1894–1951)

Joseph Arthur Ball (August 16, 1894 – August 27, 1951) was an American inventor, physicist, and executive at Technicolor. He was the technical director of the first color movie (Becky Sharp), and one of only three founding technicians of the Academy of Motion Picture Arts and Sciences. He was awarded an Academy Honorary Award at the 11th Academy Awards for his contributions to color film photography. He held many patents in color photography and was credited with creating the three-component process.
