= Timber Toppers =

1938 film

- Distributed by: 20th Century Fox
- Release date: 1938
- Country: United States
- Language: English

Timber Toppers is a 1938 American short film by 20th Century Fox. In 1939, it was nominated for an Academy Award for Best Live Action Short Film, One-Reel at the 11th Academy Awards.
