= Bill Kramer (executive) =

Director and president of the Academy Museum of Motion Pictures

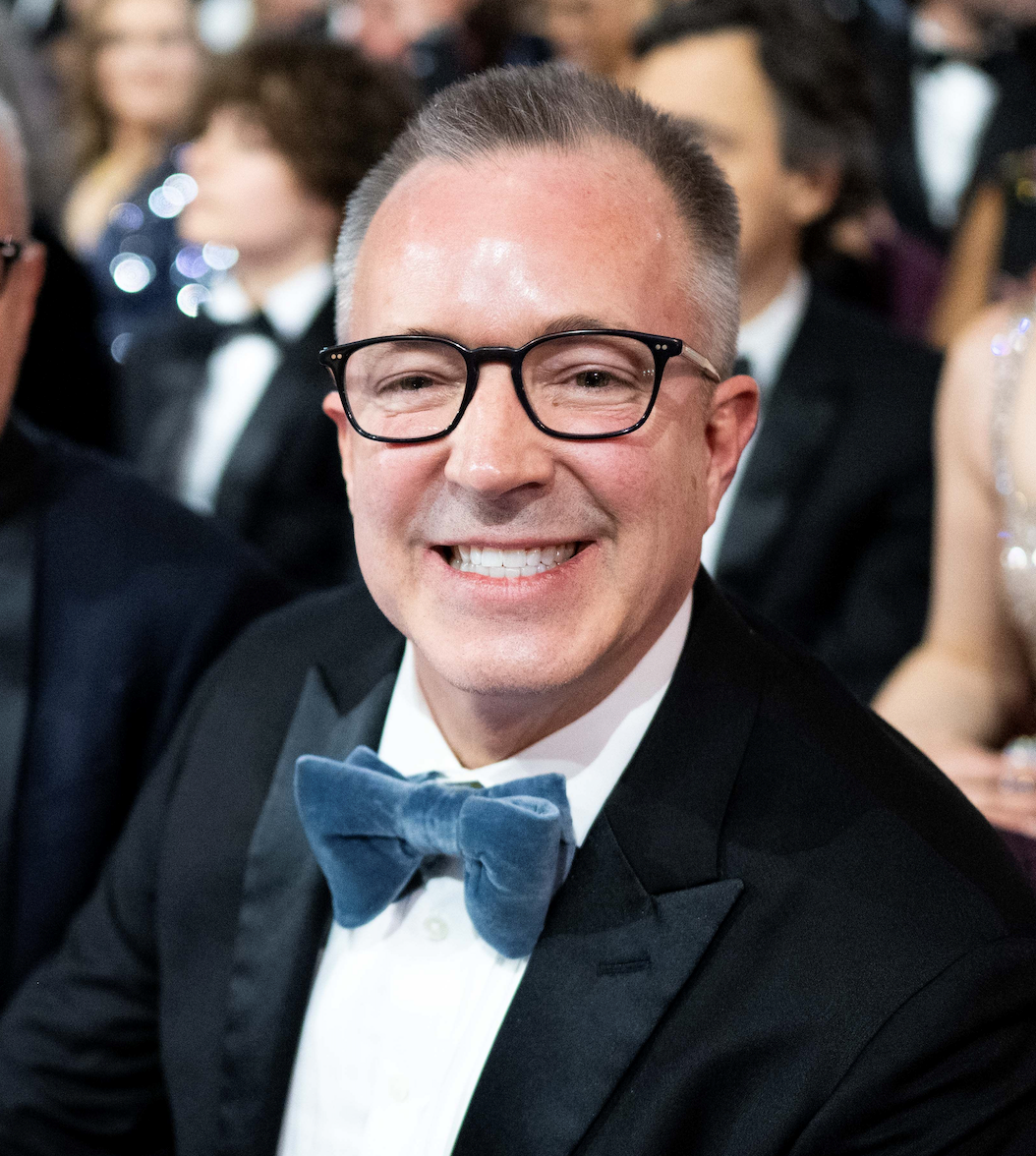
- Kramer in March 2024
- Born: 1968 or 1969; Towson, Maryland, U.S.
- Education: University of Texas at Austin; New York University
- Occupation: Chief Executive Officer
- Employer: Academy of Motion Picture Arts and Sciences

William Samuel Kramer II is the chief executive officer of the Academy of Motion Picture Arts and Sciences.

== Early life and education ==
As of March 2024, Kramer was 55 years old, placing his birth year around 1968 or 1969. Kramer grew up in Towson, Maryland. He attended the University of Texas at Austin where he received a Bachelor of Business Administration and he later continued his education at New York University for his Master of Urban Planning and Public Administration.

== Career ==
Kramer worked at the Academy Museum of Motion Pictures as the managing director of development and external relations in 2012 where he raised $250 million in funds. Kramer then left the Academy Museum in 2016 to serve as the vice-president of development at the Brooklyn Academy of Music. Earlier in his career, Kramer was responsible for several senior fundraising roles at Rhode Island School of Design, California Institute of the Arts, Southern California Institute of Architecture, the Columbia University School of the Arts, and the Sundance Institute. He then returned to the Academy Museum in October 2019 as director and president.

In 2022, Kramer was named the CEO of the Academy of Motion Picture Arts and Sciences, succeeding Dawn Hudson.

== Personal life ==
Kramer is married to Peter Cipkowski, former town supervisor of Hillsdale, New York, an educational technology consultant and lecturer at UCLA.
