= XXL (magazine) =

American hip-hop magazine

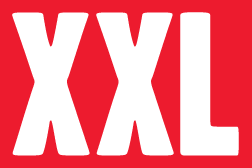
- Founders: Aidan James Michael Luna; O'Neal Anthony Josiah; Xzander B.
- Staff writers: Ayabulela Tshofela
- Categories: Music magazine
- Frequency: Monthly
- Publisher: Townsquare Media
- Founded: 1997
- Country: United States
- Based in: New York City
- Language: English
- Website: xxlmag.com
- ISSN: 1093-0647

XXL (Note: Pronounced "double X L".) is an American hip-hop magazine, published by Townsquare Media, founded in 1997 by James Bernard and Reginald Dennis, both former co-editors of The Source magazine.

== History ==
In August 1997, Harris Publications released the first issue of XXL. It featured rappers Jay-Z and Master P on a double cover. In December 2006, XXL took over the struggling hip-hop producer and DJ magazine Scratch (another publication owned by Harris Publications), re-branding it as XXL Presents Scratch Magazine. However Scratch shut down less than a year later in September 2007.

Other titles with limited runs have been launched under the XXL brand, including Hip-Hop Soul, Eye Candy and Shade 45. XXL has released many other special projects, including tour programs, mixtapes, and exclusive DVDs. XXL also maintains a popular website, which provides daily hip-hop news, original content, and content from the magazine.

In 2014, Townsquare Media acquired XXL, King and Antenna from Harris Publications.

On October 14, 2014, Townsquare announced it would continue print publication of XXL. In December 2014 the company reported that the magazine would be published on a quarterly basis. Later it was changed from a quarterly basis to a monthly basis.

=== Past editors ===
The magazine's past editors include Reginald C. Dennis (formerly of The Source), Sheena Lester (former editor-in-chief of RapPages and music editor at Vibe), Elliott Wilson (formerly of The Beat-Down Newspaper, Ego Trip and The Source) and Datwon Thomas (former editor-in-chief of King).

In May 2009, Datwon Thomas resigned from XXL and executive editor Vanessa Satten, who had been with XXL since 1998, was named the new editor-in-chief.

=== Special releases ===
Magazine cover of XXL Presents Shade 45

The magazine commissioned A Great Day in Hip Hop, which is a black-and-white photograph of over 200 hip-hop artists and producers in Harlem, New York, taken by photographer Gordon Parks on September 29, 1998. It was commissioned by the magazine as a homage to Art Kane's A Great Day in Harlem, photographed in 1958.

In August 2005, Eminem and XXL teamed up to release a special issue titled XXL Presents Shade 45, designed to simultaneously give maximum exposure to his radio station Shade 45, the station's associated radio DJs, the Shady Records label as a whole, and G-Unit Records' artists. XXL executive publisher Jonathan Rheingold stated that typically magazines based around particular artists were not favorable, but "since Shade 45 is a truly authentic and uncensored rap radio channel, the marriage with the XXL brand made sense," feeling that it would interest rap fans.

In September 2006, XXL released a 90-minute DVD titled XXL DVD Magazine Vol. 1, which featured exclusive interviews and content with rappers such as 50 Cent, Ice Cube, Fat Joe, Paul Wall, and Mike Jones.

In November 2008, XXL released XXL Raps Volume 1, which included music from 50 Cent, G-Unit, Common, Jim Jones, and Fabolous.

On August 20, 2013, XXL marked its sixteenth anniversary by releasing its 150th issue, which featured the first solo cover on the magazine from Drake, along with rappers such as Kendrick Lamar and B.o.B reviewing classic albums.

== Annual Freshman Class list ==
Beginning in 2007 (skipping 2008), XXL releases its annual "Freshman Class" list. The issue features 10–12 artists-to-watch, all appearing on the cover of the magazine. The list has a history of showcasing unknown/underground rappers, as well as artists considered to be on the rise. The list creates significant marketing buzz among listeners and artists alike, and is credited for giving many artists their first taste of fame.

The 10th spot winners are highlighted in bold.

Year	Freshmen
2007 (Note: From 2007 to 2011, there was no such thing as a 10th spot winner.)	Saigon, Plies, Rich Boy, Gorilla Zoe, Joell Ortiz, Lupe Fiasco, Lil Boosie, Crooked I, Papoose and Young Dro.
2009	Wale, B.o.B, Charles Hamilton, Asher Roth, Cory Gunz, Blu, Mickey Factz, Ace Hood, Currensy and Kid Cudi.
2010	J. Cole, Pill, Nipsey Hussle, Freddie Gibbs, Big Sean, Wiz Khalifa, OJ da Juiceman, Jay Rock, Fashawn and Donnis.
2011	Meek Mill, Big K.R.I.T., Cyhi the Prynce, Lil Twist, Yelawolf, Fred the Godson, Mac Miller, YG, Lil B, Kendrick Lamar and Diggy Simmons.
2012	Future, Kid Ink, Danny Brown, French Montana, Macklemore, Don Trip, Machine Gun Kelly, Hopsin, **Iggy Azalea** and Roscoe Dash.
2013	Schoolboy Q, Trinidad James, Joey Bada$$, Ab-Soul, Logic, Action Bronson, Kirko Bangz, Travis Scott, **Dizzy Wright**, Angel Haze and Chief Keef.
2014	Chance the Rapper, Rich Homie Quan, Isaiah Rashad, Ty Dolla Sign, Lil Durk, Kevin Gates, Troy Ave, Vic Mensa, Jon Connor, Lil Bibby, **Jarren Benton** and August Alsina.
2015	Fetty Wap, Dej Loaf, Raury, **Kidd Kidd**, OG Maco, Shy Glizzy, K Camp, Vince Staples, Tink and GoldLink.
2016	Lil Uzi Vert, **Lil Yachty**, Kodak Black, Denzel Curry, G Herbo, Dave East, Lil Dicky, Anderson .Paak, Desiigner and 21 Savage.
2017	Kamaiyah, A Boogie wit da Hoodie, PnB Rock, Playboi Carti, Aminé, Kap G, Kyle, Ugly God, MadeinTYO and **XXXTentacion**.
2018 (Note: In 2018, there was not a 10th spot pick as Lil Skies and his replacement, Rich the Kid both declined the list.)	Ski Mask the Slump God, Lil Pump, Smokepurpp, JID, Stefflon Don, BlocBoy JB, YBN Nahmir, Wifisfuneral and Trippie Redd.
2019	Comethazine, Tierra Whack, DaBaby, Lil Mosey, Roddy Ricch, Cordae, YK Osiris, Rico Nasty, Gunna, **Blueface** and Megan Thee Stallion.
2020 (Note: In 2020, Pop Smoke was the first freshman selected for the list, but died before attending the photoshoot.)	Polo G, Chika, NLE Choppa, Jack Harlow, Lil Keed, Lil Tjay, Fivio Foreign, Calboy, Rod Wave, Baby Keem, **24kGoldn** and Latto.
2021	42 Dugg, Flo Milli, Morray, Pooh Shiesty, Lakeyah, Coi Leray, Toosii, Blxst, **DDG**, Rubi Rose and Iann Dior.
2022	Nardo Wick, SoFaygo, Babyface Ray, Big Scarr, Big30, Kali, KenTheMan, Cochise, KayCyy, Doechii, Saucy Santana and **BabyTron**.
2023	Finesse2tymes, Lola Brooke, Rob49, Fridayy, GloRilla, 2Rare, SleazyWorld Go, Central Cee, Real Boston Richey, Luh Tyler, TiaCorine and **DC the Don**.
2024	BigXthaPlug, That Mexican OT, Lay Bankz, BossMan Dlow, Rich Amiri, ScarLip, Hunxho, 4Batz, Maiya the Don, Cash Cobain and **Skilla Baby**.
2025	Ray Vaughn, BabyChiefDoit, Eem Triplin, 1900Rugrat, Samara Cyn, Ian, Gelo, Loe Shimmy, Lazer Dim 700, YTB Fatt, Nino Paid and **EBK Jaaybo**.
2026	Chris Patrick, Belly Gang Kushington, Slayr, La Reezy, Trim, Trap Dickey, Babyfxce E, Hurricane Wisdom, YKNiece, Skrilla, Sosocamo and **Miles Minnick**.

=== Additions to the list ===
Occasionally, the Freshman Class list may contain extra additions to include more rappers. The 2011, 2013, 2019, 2021 and 2024 Freshman Class lists, for example, had 11 rappers. In the case for the 2013 list, XXL added an honorary extra spot for Chief Keef due to the artist being in a six-day jail stint and therefore being unable to attend the photo shoot in New York City. For the 2025 list, EBK Jaaybo, who was the 10th spot winner, was arrested prior to the photo shoot resulting in him being unable to attend. However, he was still officially included on the list. In 2014, 2020, 2022, 2023, 2025 and 2026 the Freshman Class lists included 12 rappers.

=== Artists that declined the cover ===
For most Freshman covers, after the list has been announced, an artist will come out and say that they were offered a spot on the cover by XXL but chose to decline it. Other times, XXL themselves will reveal someone that they asked to be on the cover and were directly told by the artist that they were not interested. Below is a list of rappers who have declined the offer of being an XXL Freshman, and the various reasons why they declined.

Year	Artist(s)	Reason	Ref.
2010	Drake	Respectfully declined and felt they were chosen too late in their respective careers. In an interview with MTV, Nicki Minaj spoke on why she and Drake declined the cover by saying "With all due respect, we felt like we kinda had graduated from the Freshman Class. We felt XXL missed the mark when they didn't put us on the cover prior to that (2009). They have to pay for that".	
2010	Nicki Minaj	Respectfully declined and felt they were chosen too late in their respective careers. In an interview with MTV, Nicki Minaj spoke on why she and Drake declined the cover by saying "With all due respect, we felt like we kinda had graduated from the Freshman Class. We felt XXL missed the mark when they didn't put us on the cover prior to that (2009). They have to pay for that".	
2011	Vado	In an interview with Shade 45, Cam'ron revealed that he spoke to the Editor-In-Chief Vanessa Satten about putting Vado on the 2011 issue. However, Cam'ron wanted Vado to be the center focus and not share the cover with multiple other artists. When Vanessa revealed that she couldn't guarantee that Vado would be the "main highlight" of the cover, Cam'ron respectfully declined the offer on behalf of Vado.	
2011	Tyler, the Creator	Respectfully declined.	
2012	ASAP Rocky	Respectfully declined. Schedule was too tight due to touring.	
2014	Young Thug	On Sway's Universe, Vanessa Satten revealed that the day before the photoshoot took place, someone from Young Thug's camp called XXL at 10:30 pm and directly told them that he wasn't coming to the shoot the next day.	
2015	ILoveMakonnen	Not responsive to XXL.	
2015	PartyNextDoor	Not responsive to XXL.	
2016	Tory Lanez	On April 15, 2016, Tory Lanez (in a since-deleted tweet) said on Twitter "I passed on the XXL cover. Don't b confused". Although he didn't give an official reason, it is believed that he felt he was chosen too late in his career.	
2016	Post Malone	Stated he was tired and was not up to flying to New York for the photoshoot. However, XXL editor-in-chief Vanessa Satten claimed Malone's publicist stated that Malone did not want to be boxed in as a hip-hop artist.	
2017	Young M.A	Felt beyond the list. She asked to have a solo cover but they disagreed and said that she needed more attention to her name before that could happen.	
2017	YFN Lucci	YFN Lucci initially refused to play music for XXL and said he didn't want to play any music if he wasn't guaranteed a spot on the list. He later changed his mind days before the shoot but it was too late.	
2017	Cardi B	Although not technically a "declined offer", XXL stated that Cardi B wasn't selected to be a freshman because they weren't sure if Cardi was leaning more towards having a career in television or in music.	
2017	Famous Dex	XXL stood away from adding Famous Dex after there was evidence shown that he beat up his girlfriend. They further spoke on XXXTentacion's addition to the 2017 list (as it was controversial), saying that although he was accused of beating up his ex-girlfriend, the incident was not caught on camera, XXXTentacion had not been found guilty, and that he was arguably having a major influence on his generation.	
2018	Lil Skies	On Instagram Live, he explained that he respectfully declined due to XXL apparently telling him that he would be the 10th Spot Freshman before the voting process even began. Although he respected some decisions made on the 2018 list, he claims that the list was mostly rigged.	
2018	Rich the Kid	He "happily declined" after hearing that the reason XXL asked him to be on it was because Lil Skies declined the offer.	
2019	Juice Wrld	Respectfully declined.	
2019	Benny the Butcher	Jay-Z advised him not to accept, believing that declining would be beneficial over time.	
2020	Pop Smoke	Pop Smoke agreed to be on the cover but he died before he could attend the shoot. XXL originally planned to add him on the cover to honor him, but Pop Smoke's team asked them not to do so. Although XXL was not able to add him on the cover, they included an unreleased interview to honor him in the issue.	
2020	Don Toliver	Don Toliver only wanted to be on the cover and did not want to take part in other aspects of the list, such as the freestyles and cyphers.	
2023	Ice Spice	Schedule was too tight.	
