= Pickford Center for Motion Picture Study =

Cinema museum in Los Angeles, California

Coordinates: 34.094819°N 118.327257°W

- Interactive map of Pickford Center for Motion Picture Study
- Location: 1313 Vine Street, Los Angeles, California

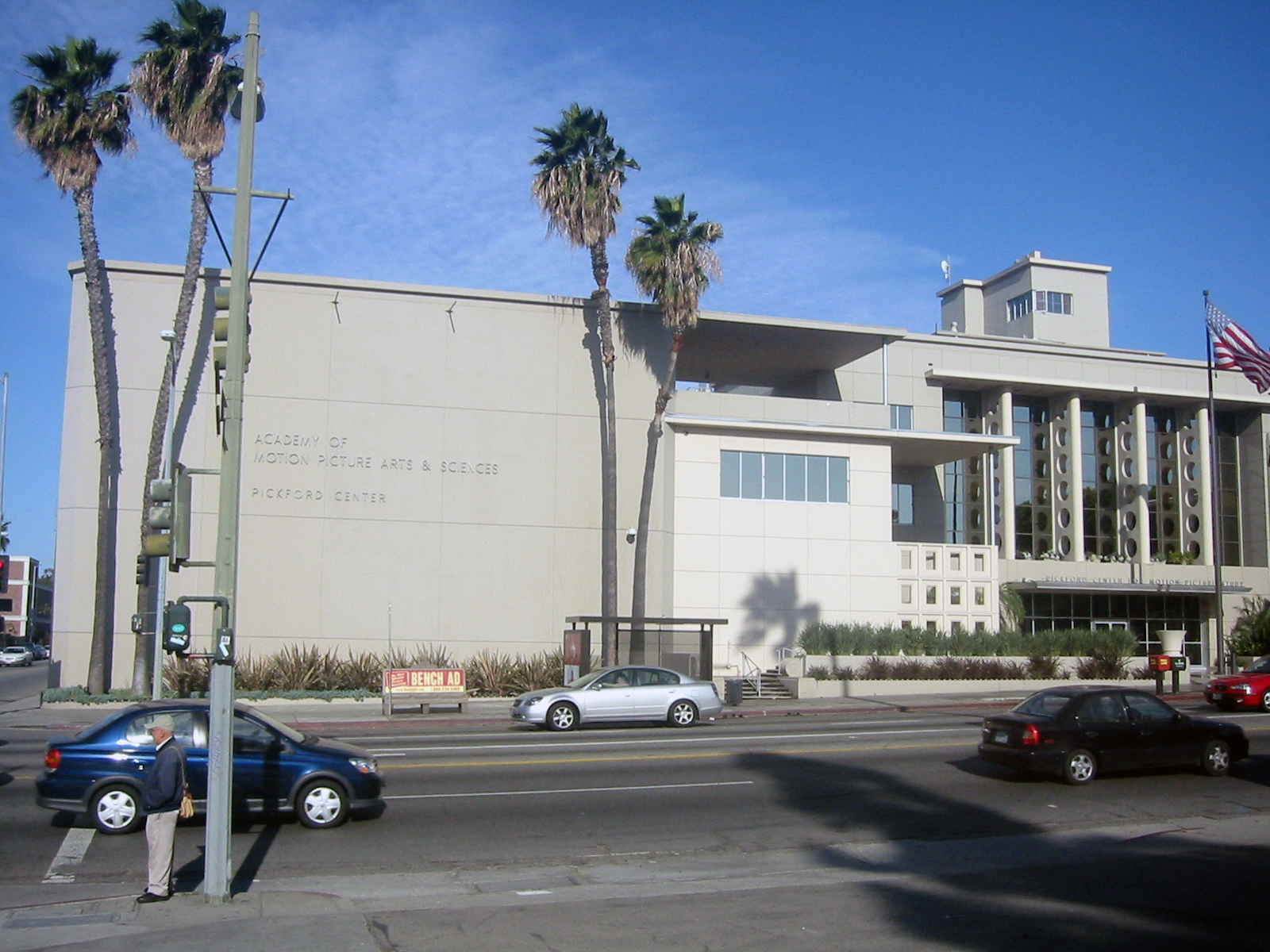
Pickford Center for Motion Picture Study in Hollywood, Los Angeles, California

The Pickford Center for Motion Picture Study, owned by the Academy of Motion Picture Arts and Sciences, is home to a portion of the 52 million item Academy Collection and the Academy Film Archive, located in central Hollywood. The building also houses the 286-seat Linwood Dunn Theater.

== History ==
Although the Academy Film Archive was not officially established until 1991, the Academy started storing film prints and archival papers soon after the first Oscars ceremony in 1929, when members began donating materials to the organization. In 1948, a committee of Academy members launched a campaign to acquire all past Oscar-winning and nominated–films, along with many others. In 1994, this officially became the rule at the Academy, with all films stored at the Archive.

Originally located in the same building as the Margaret Herrick Library, the Archive moved to Vine Street in 2002 when the Pickford Center for Motion Picture Study opened. The building was designed by Claud Beelman and constructed in 1948. Originally a radio and television studio, it is the oldest surviving broadcasting studio building in Los Angeles. First called the Don Lee Mutual Broadcasting Building and originally dedicated on August 18, 1948, as studios for the Mutual-Don Lee Broadcasting System, it was owned by CBS and then by ABC, and it was used for taping series such as The Joey Bishop Show, The Dating Game, The Newlywed Game, and Barney Miller, among others.

After it was acquired by the Academy in 2000 and remodeled, the building was renamed in 2002 after Mary Pickford, a founding member of the Academy. The facility’s upgrades included constructing temperature-controlled storage spaces and a state-of-the-art fire suppression system. The renovations also included the addition of the 286-seat Linwood Dunn Theater, named after a visual effects pioneer, to accommodate public programming and screenings of Award-eligible films for Academy members. Additionally, the building houses the offices of several Academy departments, including the Student Academy Awards, the Nicholl Fellowships in Screenwriting, and the Academy Gold internship program.

== Present ==
Today, the Pickford Center for Motion Picture Study is the home of the Academy Film Archive, which holds over 230,000 items, making it one of the most diverse and extensive motion picture collections in the world. The Archive maintains all Academy Award–winning films in the Best Picture and Documentary categories as well as many other Oscar-nominated films across categories. It also houses the personal collections of filmmakers such as Tacita Dean, Cecil B. DeMille, Barbara Hammer, Alfred Hitchcock, Jim Jarmusch, Penelope Spheeris, George Stevens, Gus Van Sant, and Fred Zinnemann.

As one of the Academy’s research and preservation arms, the Pickford also plays an important role in the pre-production of every Academy Awards ceremony.
