= Girls in the Windows =

1960 photograph by Ormond Gigli

Girls in the Windows

Girls in the Windows is a 1960 photograph by Ormond Gigli (died 2019). It depicts 41 colorfully dressed women standing in the windows of a brownstone building on East 58th Street on the Upper East Side of Manhattan, and two other women on the sidewalk near a Rolls-Royce car. It has been estimated to be the most commercially valuable photograph and one of the most collected, on account of the great number of signed copies that have been sold at auction.

== Creation history ==
Ormond Gigli, a freelance photographer aged 35 in 1960, created the image on his own initiative. He wanted to preserve the memory of the distinctive brownstone houses across from his home studio that were slated for demolition.

Just days before this was to happen, Gigli arranged for 40 models from an agency. They were paid $1 each (equivalent to $11 in 2025) for the entire shoot, and told to bring their own dresses and arrange their own hair and make-up. To these, he added two more women: his wife, Sue Ellen Gigli (in the second row, far right), and the wife of the demolition supervisor who allowed Gigli to use the building in exchange for including her (on the third floor, third from the left). Shouting through a bullhorn, Gigli arranged the women from his studio across the street, telling them to "pose as if they were giving someone a kiss".

== Commercial history ==
The photograph did not become commercially available until 1994, when Sue Ellen Gigli offered it to a gallery. Since then, more than 160 signed prints have been sold at auction at a total price of around $12 million.

Auction house experts have estimated it to be the most-collected and highest-grossing photograph of all time. Unlike most other fine art photographs, of which few reproductions are sold in order to create scarcity, Ormond Gigli made and signed dozen of prints of the photograph in each of 12 sizes. About 100 remain to be sold as of 2023, according to Gigli's son and estate manager, Ogden Gigli.

== Reception and influence ==
In a 2016 feature for Artforum magazine, artist and photographer Laurie Simmons described "Girls in the Windows" as "one of my favorite fashion photos".

== See also ==
- A Great Day in Harlem
