= A Great Day in Hip Hop =

1998 photograph by Gordon Parks

- XXL #7 centerfold of the photograph
- Artist: Gordon Parks
- Completion date: September 29, 1998
- Type: Street photography
- Location: Harlem, New York
- Owner: The Gordon Parks Organization

A Great Day in Hip Hop is a black-and-white photograph of over 200 hip hop artists and producers in Harlem, New York, taken by photographer Gordon Parks on September 29, 1998. It was commissioned by XXL magazine, as a homage to Art Kane's A Great Day in Harlem, photographed in 1958.

The photo was featured on the cover of December 1998's special edition of XXL, titled "The Greatest Day in Hip Hop", as the date of photoshoot coincided with the release dates of albums from Jay-Z, A Tribe Called Quest, OutKast, Brand Nubian, and Black Star.

== Background ==
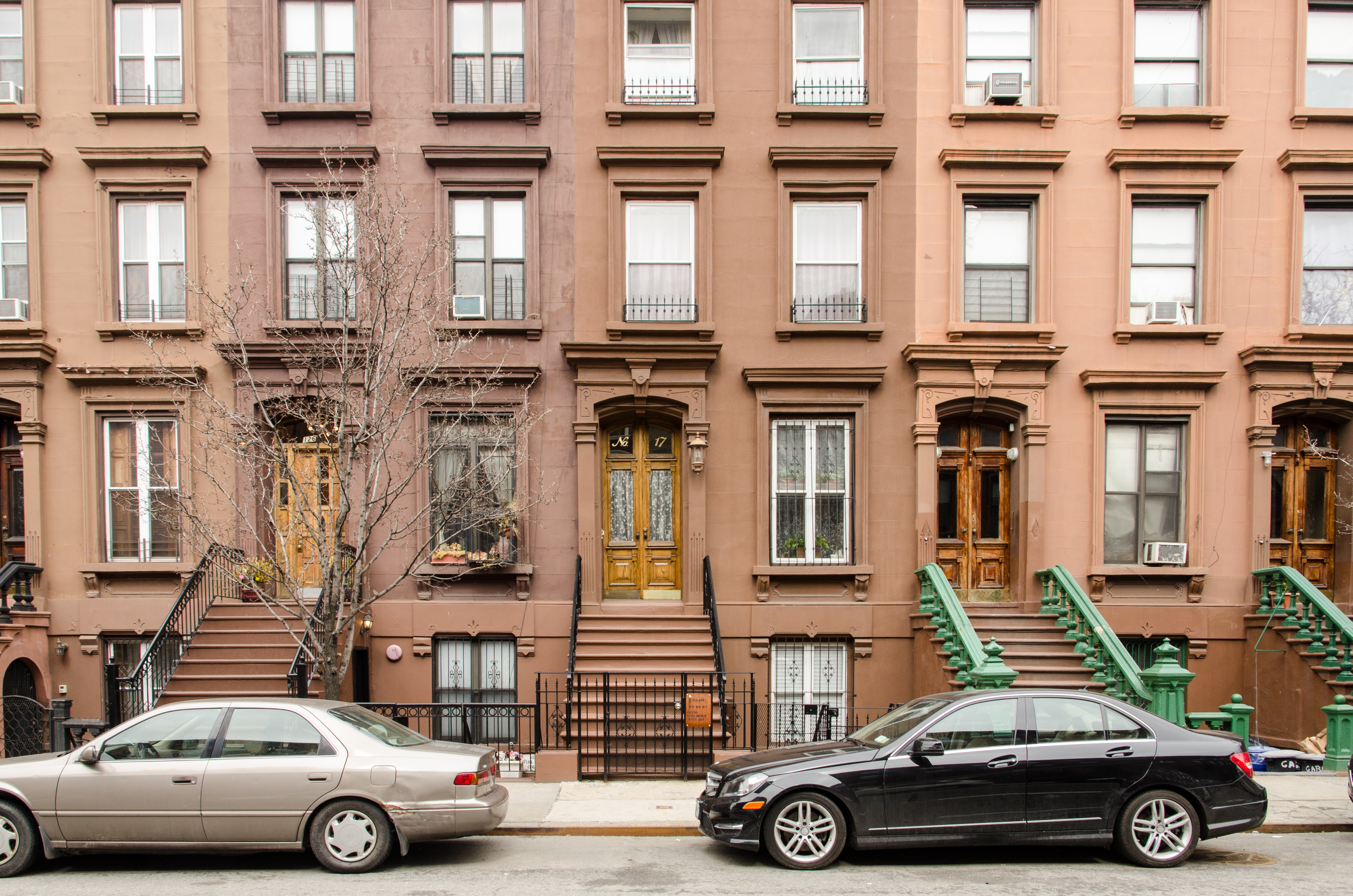
17 East 126th Street where the photograph was taken (pictured in 2015)

In 1995, Life magazine commissioned a retake of A Great Day in Harlem gathered ten of the surviving musicians from the photograph, with Parks photographing where they stood. American writer Michael A. Gonzales wrote about the photograph, “As a Harlem boy born a few blocks away from the brownstone where Kane shot the ensemble of jazz musicians, I knew firsthand how much the community had changed in the 40 years since the original picture was taken. That neighborhood had seen it all—from riots and blackouts to heroin and the crack years.”

Three years after the photograph, 177 participants were assembled, including rappers, producers, and influencers, on the stoop of brownstone number 17. The photograph would represent the following generation, giving a new touch to the 1958 photograph. Various rappers including the Beastie Boys, Big Pun, Public Enemy, KRS-One, and most members of the Wu-Tang Clan were invited to attend, but did not attend or cancelled the invitation.

== Musicians in the photograph ==
The photograph features over 200 people, including artists who participated without an invitation and bystanders who happened to be at the scene. XXL staff identified 177 people:

- 8Ball
- A+
- A-Plus
- Afrika Baby Bam
- Ali Shaheed Muhammad
- Akil Shabazz
- Andre Harrell
- Angie Stone
- Baby Sham
- Barron Ricks
- Benny B
- Big Gipp
- Big L
- Binky Mack
- Black Thought
- Boo Kapone
- Brew
- Buckshot
- Busta Rhymes
- Cam'ron
- Canibus
- Cappadonna
- Casper
- Ced Gee
- CeeLo Green
- Chris Stein
- Common
- Cold Hard
- Cris Lowe
- D-Nice
- Da Brat
- Daddy-O
- Deborah Harry
- Del
- Dice Raw
- DJ A-Dam-Bomb
- DJ Chuck Chillout
- DJ Clue
- DJ Evil Dee
- DJ Jazzy Jeff
- DJ Hollywood
- DJ Nabs
- DJ Scratch
- DJ Scratcha
- DJ Tony Tone
- Doctor Ice
- Domino
- E-40
- E-Swift
- Easy A.D.
- Ed O.G.
- Fab 5 Freddy
- Fat Joe
- Freddie Foxxx
- Grandmaster Caz
- Grandmaster Flash
- Greg Nice
- Grege Morris
- Gregory Phillips
- Hakim
- Heather B
- The Hulkster
- Inspectah Deck
- Jadakiss
- Jagged Edge
- Jane Blaze
- Jarobi
- Jayo Felony
- Joe Clair
- John Forté
- Jermaine Dupri
- Juju
- K.P.
- Kamal Gray
- Kangol Kid
- Kasino
- Kay Gee
- Kid Capri
- Kidd Creole
- Kilo
- Kingpin Shaheim
- King J. Britt
- King Britt
- Kool Herc
- Kool Keith
- Kool Moe Dee
- Khujo
- Kris Kross
- Kurupt
- Liffy Stokes
- Loon
- Lord Jamar
- Lord Have Mercy
- Lord Tariq
- Luke
- Mack 10
- Mark Sexx
- Marley Marl
- Maseo
- Melle Mel
- MC Booo
- MC Eiht
- MC Knight
- MC Serch
- MC Shan
- MJG
- Mike Gee
- Milk Dee
- Mos Def
- Mr. Reck
- Muggs
- MyQuan Jackson
- Never
- Nikki D
- Opio
- Paula Perry
- Pee Wee Dance
- Pete Rock
- Peter Gunz
- Phesto
- Phife Dawg
- Pop La B
- Posdnuos
- Pras
- Psycho Les
- Q-Tip
- Queen Pen
- Questlove
- Rah Digga
- Rakim
- Rampage
- Reggie Reg
- Richie Rich
- Rodney C
- Russell Simmons
- Saafir
- Scarface
- Schoolly D
- Shaquille O'Neal
- Sheek Louch
- Shyheim
- Slick Rick
- Smooth B
- Special K
- Spliff Star
- Steele
- Sticky Fingaz
- Styles P
- T Baby
- T La Rock
- T-Mo
- Tajai
- Talib Kweli
- Tash
- Teddy Ted
- Tek
- Tela
- Thomas Anthony
- Treach
- Trugoy
- Tuffy
- Twista
- U-God
- Vinny
- Wildstyle
- Willie D.
- Wise Intelligent
- Wyclef Jean
- X1
- Xzibit
- Yoda

== Aftermath ==
A Great Day in Hip Hop received national attention through the XXL magazine, paving the way for many shoots in various cities including Atlanta, Los Angeles, Detroit, and Houston, the following years.

The following year, West Coast rappers gathered together for a photo shoot known as A Day in the West in Los Angeles, with rappers including Dr. Dre, Snoop Dogg, Cypress Hill, Warren G, DJ Quik, King T, and more present.

In 2005, MTV would organize an event for Atlanta's most notable rappers including Ludacris, T.I., Young Jeezy, Killer Mike, and DJ Drama.
