= Knats =

English jazz ensemble

- Origin: Newcastle upon Tyne, England
- Genres: Jazz; fusion
- Instruments: Drums; bass guitar; trumpet; tenor saxophone; piano

Knats are a jazz band originally from Newcastle upon Tyne in England. They were nominated for the 2026 Mercury Prize. Their work combines jazz with elements of rock, spoken-word poetry and punk.

== Origins ==
King David Ike-Elechi (drums) and Stan Woodward (bass) met as teenagers at school in Newcastle and started playing rock covers together before eventually playing reggae and jazz. They moved to London c. 2022 to study jazz at Trinity Laban; they met Ferg Kilsby (trumpet), who is from Hexham near Newcastle, online after watching him play on YouTube.

== History ==
They released their debut album, Knats, in 2025.

Their second album, A Great Day in Newcastle, was released in 2026 and was nominated for the 2026 Mercury Prize. The cover photo is an homage to the 1958 photo A Great Day in Harlem. It was produced for free by Black Midi's Geordie Greep. The album's track Wor Jackie tells the story of Newcastle United footballer and coal miner Jackie Milburn.

== Live performances ==
In 2025, the band supported Geordie Greep on his solo tour, and performed as the backing band for Eddie Chacon on his UK tour.

In 2026, they performed at SXSW and supported Nadine Shah and the Royal Northern Sinfonia for their BBC Proms performance at Glasshouse International Centre for Music in Gateshead.

== Personnel ==
- King David-Ike Elechi (drums)
- Stan Woodward (bass)
- Ferg Kilsby (trumpet)
- George Johnson (tenor saxophone)
- Sandro Shar (piano)
- Cooper Robson (vocals) (A Great Day in Newcastle)

== Musical style ==
The band credit artists Charles Mingus, Miles Davis and Ahmed Jamal as their key influences. They describe their music as "Geordie jazz" or "Geordie noir".

== Discography ==
- Knats (2025)
- A Great Day in Newcastle (2026)

== Awards and nominations ==
Award	Year	Nominee(s) / Work(s)	Category	Result	Ref.
Parliamentary Jazz Awards	2026	Band	Jazz Ensemble of the Year	Won	
Mercury Prize	2026	A Great Day in Newcastle	Album of the Year	Pending	
