= Academy of Motion Picture Arts and Sciences =

Professional organization in the film industry

Coordinates: 34°04′02″N 118°23′15″W

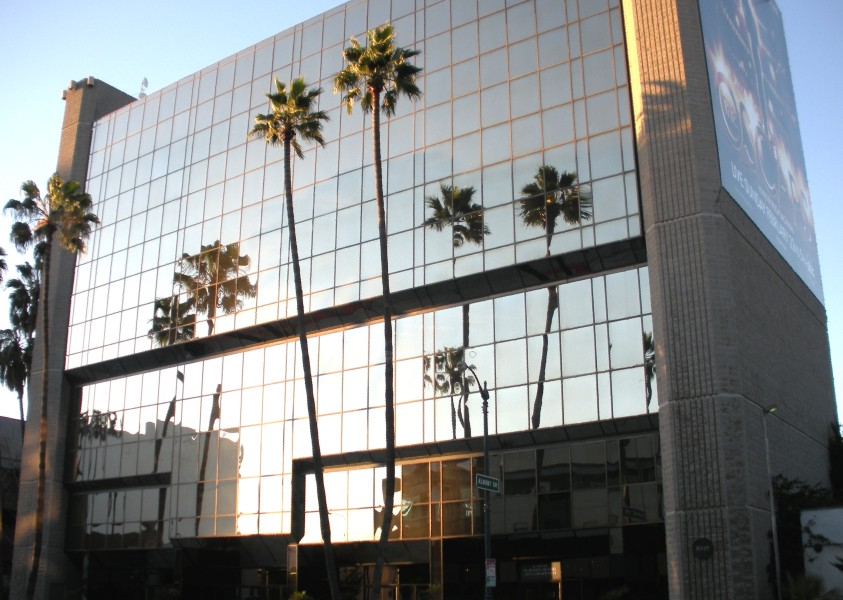
- Headquarters building
- Abbreviation: AMPAS
- Formation: May 11, 1927; 99 years ago
- Type: Trade association
- Tax ID no.: 95-0473280
- Legal status: 501(c)(6)
- Purpose: "To recognize and uphold excellence in the motion picture arts and sciences, inspire imagination, and connect the world through the medium of motion pictures"
- Headquarters: Beverly Hills, California, U.S.
- Members: 11,000 (2025)
- President: Lynette Howell Taylor
- CEO: Bill Kramer
- Subsidiaries: Academy Museum Foundation; Academy Foundation; Archival Foundation; Vine Street Archive Foundation
- Employees: 700 (2025)
- Website: oscars.org

The Academy of Motion Picture Arts and Sciences (AMPAS, often pronounced /ˈæmpæs/ AM-pass; also known as simply the Academy or the Motion Picture Academy) is a professional honorary organization in Beverly Hills, California, U.S., with the stated goal of advancing the arts and sciences of motion pictures. The Academy's corporate management and general policies are overseen by a board of governors, which includes representatives from each of the craft branches.

As of 2025, the organization was estimated to consist of more than 11,000 motion picture professionals. The Academy is an international organization and membership is open to qualified filmmakers around the world.

The Academy is known around the world for its annual Academy Awards, both officially and popularly known as "The Oscars". In addition, the Academy holds the Governors Awards annually for lifetime achievement in film; presents Scientific and Technical Awards annually; gives Student Academy Awards annually to filmmakers at the undergraduate and graduate level; and honors film artists at the Academy Museum Gala.

The Academy also operates the Margaret Herrick Library in Beverly Hills, the Academy Film Archive, the Pickford Center for Motion Picture Study in Hollywood, Los Angeles, and the Academy opened the Academy Museum of Motion Pictures in Los Angeles in 2021. The Academy maintains the largest film-related collection in the world, including 52 million items, which are conserved and exhibited through the Academy Foundation.

== History ==
The notion of the Academy of Motion Picture Arts and Sciences (AMPAS) began with Louis B. Mayer, the studio head of Metro-Goldwyn-Mayer (MGM). He said he wanted to create an organization that would mediate labor disputes without unions and improve the film industry's image. In other words, the Academy was originally founded as a company union. Mayer met with actor Conrad Nagel, director Fred Niblo, and the head of the Association of Motion Picture Producers, Fred Beetson to discuss these matters. The idea of this elite club having an annual banquet was discussed, but no mention of awards at that time. They also established that membership into the organization would only be open to people involved in one of the five branches of the industry: actors, directors, writers, technicians, and producers.

After their brief meeting, Mayer gathered a group of thirty-six people involved in the film industry and invited them to a formal banquet at the Ambassador Hotel in Los Angeles on January 11, 1927. That evening, Mayer presented to those guests what he called the International Academy of Motion Picture Arts and Sciences. Everyone in the room that evening became a founder of the Academy. Between that evening and when the official Articles of Incorporation for the organization were filed on May 4, 1927, the "International" was dropped from the name, becoming the "Academy of Motion Picture Arts and Sciences".

Several organizational meetings were held prior to the first official meeting held on May 6, 1927. Their first organizational meeting was held on May 11 at the Biltmore Hotel. At that meeting Douglas Fairbanks Sr. was elected as the first president of the Academy, while Fred Niblo was the first vice-president, and their first roster, composed of 230 members, was printed. Initially, the Academy was broken down into five main groups, or branches, although this number of branches has grown over the years. The original five were: Producers, Actors, Directors, Writers and Technicians.

The initial concerns of the group had to do with labor. However, as time went on, the organization moved "further away from involvement in labor-management arbitrations and negotiations." During the Great Depression, the Academy lost all credibility among studio employee members with respect to labor issues when it took the side of the major film studios in the latter's efforts to convince employees to agree to voluntary reductions in wages and salaries. The Academy thus evolved into its modern role as an honorary organization.

The initial location of the organization was 6912 Hollywood Boulevard. In November 1927, the Academy moved to the Roosevelt Hotel at 7010 Hollywood Boulevard, which was also the month the Academy's library began compiling a complete collection of books and periodicals dealing with the industry from around the world. In May 1928, the Academy authorized the construction of a state of the art screening room, to be located in the Club lounge of the hotel. The screening room was not completed until April 1929.

With the publication of Academy Reports (No. 1): Incandescent Illumination in July 1928, the Academy began a long history of publishing books to assist its members. Research Council of the Academy of Motion Picture Arts and Sciences trained Signal Corps officers, during World War II, who later won two Oscars, for Seeds of Destiny and Toward Independence.

In 1929, Academy members, in a joint venture with the University of Southern California, created America's first film school to further the art and science of moving pictures. The school's founding faculty included Fairbanks (President of the Academy), D. W. Griffith, William C. deMille, Ernst Lubitsch, Irving Thalberg, and Darryl F. Zanuck.

1930 saw another move, to the Hollywood Professional Building, in order to accommodate the enlarging staff, and by December of that year the library was acknowledged as "having one of the most complete collections of information on the motion picture industry anywhere in existence." They remained at that location until 1935 when further growth caused them to move once again. This time, the administrative offices moved to one location, to the Taft Building at the corner of Hollywood and Vine, while the library moved to 1455 North Gordon Street.

In 1934, the Academy began publication of the Screen Achievement Records Bulletin, which today is known as the Motion Picture Credits Database. This is a list of film credits up for an Academy Award, as well as other films released in Los Angeles County, using research materials from the Academy's Margaret Herrick Library. Another publication of the 1930s was the first annual Academy Players Directory in 1937. The Directory was published by the Academy until 2006 when it was sold to a private concern. The Academy had been involved in the technical aspects of film making since its founding in 1927, and by 1938, the Research Council consisted of 36 technical committees addressing technical issues related to sound recording and reproduction, projection, lighting, film preservation, and cinematography.

In 1946, the Academy found it necessary to move to a new headquarters, and it acquired the Marquis Theatre at 9038 Melrose Avenue in West Hollywood, which it renamed the Academy Awards Theatre, utilizing the building for both offices and an entertainment venue. The renaming turned out to be fortuitous, as the 21st Academy Awards, held March 24, 1949, were moved there at the last minute.

The Academy acquired property at 8949 Wilshire Boulevard in Beverly Hills in 1972, and built its current headquarters building on the site; the new facilities opened in 1975.

In 2009, the inaugural Governors Awards were held, at which the Academy presents the Academy Honorary Award, the Jean Hersholt Humanitarian Award and the Irving G. Thalberg Memorial Award.

In 2016, the Academy became the target of criticism for its failure to recognize the achievements of minority professionals. For the second year in a row, all 20 nominees in the major acting categories were white. The president of the Academy, Cheryl Boone Isaacs, the first African American and third woman to lead the Academy, denied in 2015 that there was a problem. When asked if the Academy had difficulty with recognizing diversity, she replied "Not at all. Not at all." When the nominations for acting were all white for a second year in a row Gil Robertson IV, president of the African American Film Critics Association, called it "offensive." The actors' branch is "overwhelmingly white" and the question is raised whether conscious or unconscious racial biases played a role.

Spike Lee, interviewed shortly after the all-white nominee list was published, pointed to Hollywood leadership as the root problem, "We may win an Oscar now and then, but an Oscar is not going to fundamentally change how Hollywood does business. I'm not talking about Hollywood stars. I'm talking about executives. We're not in the room." Boone Isaacs also released a statement, in which she said "I am both heartbroken and frustrated about the lack of inclusion. This is a difficult but important conversation, and it's time for big changes." After Boone Isaac's statement, prominent African-Americans such as director Spike Lee, actors Will Smith and Jada Pinkett Smith, and activist Rev. Al Sharpton called for a boycott of the 2016 Oscars for failing to recognize minority achievements, the Board of Governors announced it would double its number of women and minority members by 2020.

In 2018, the Academy invited a record 928 new members.

Casting director David Rubin was elected President of the Academy in August, 2019.

In 2020, Parasite became the first non-English language film to win Best Picture. In June 2022, Bill Kramer was named the CEO of the Academy. Also in 2022, Janet Yang was elected as the first Asian American President of the Academy.

In 2024, Amy Homma was named Director and President of the Academy Museum of Motion Pictures.

In July 2025, Lynette Howell Taylor was elected President of the Academy.

== Galleries and theaters ==
The Academy's numerous and diverse operations are housed in three facilities in the Los Angeles area: the headquarters building in Beverly Hills, which was constructed specifically for the Academy, and two Centers for Motion Picture Study – one in Beverly Hills, the other in Hollywood – which were existing structures restored and transformed to contain the Academy's Library, Film Archive and other departments and programs.

=== Current ===
==== Academy Headquarters ====
The Academy Headquarters Building in Beverly Hills once housed two galleries that were open free to the public. The Grand Lobby Gallery and the Fourth Floor Gallery offered changing exhibits related to films, film-making and film personalities. These galleries were closed in preparation for the construction of the Academy Museum of Motion Pictures, which opened in 2021.

The building includes the Samuel Goldwyn Theater, which seats 1,012, and was designed to present films at maximum technical accuracy, with state-of-the-art projection equipment and sound system. The theater is busy year-round with members-only screenings, movie premieres and other special activities (including the live television broadcast of the Academy Awards nominations announcement every January). The building once housed the Academy Little Theater, a 67-seat screening facility, but this was converted to additional office space in a building remodel.

==== Pickford Center for Motion Picture Study ====
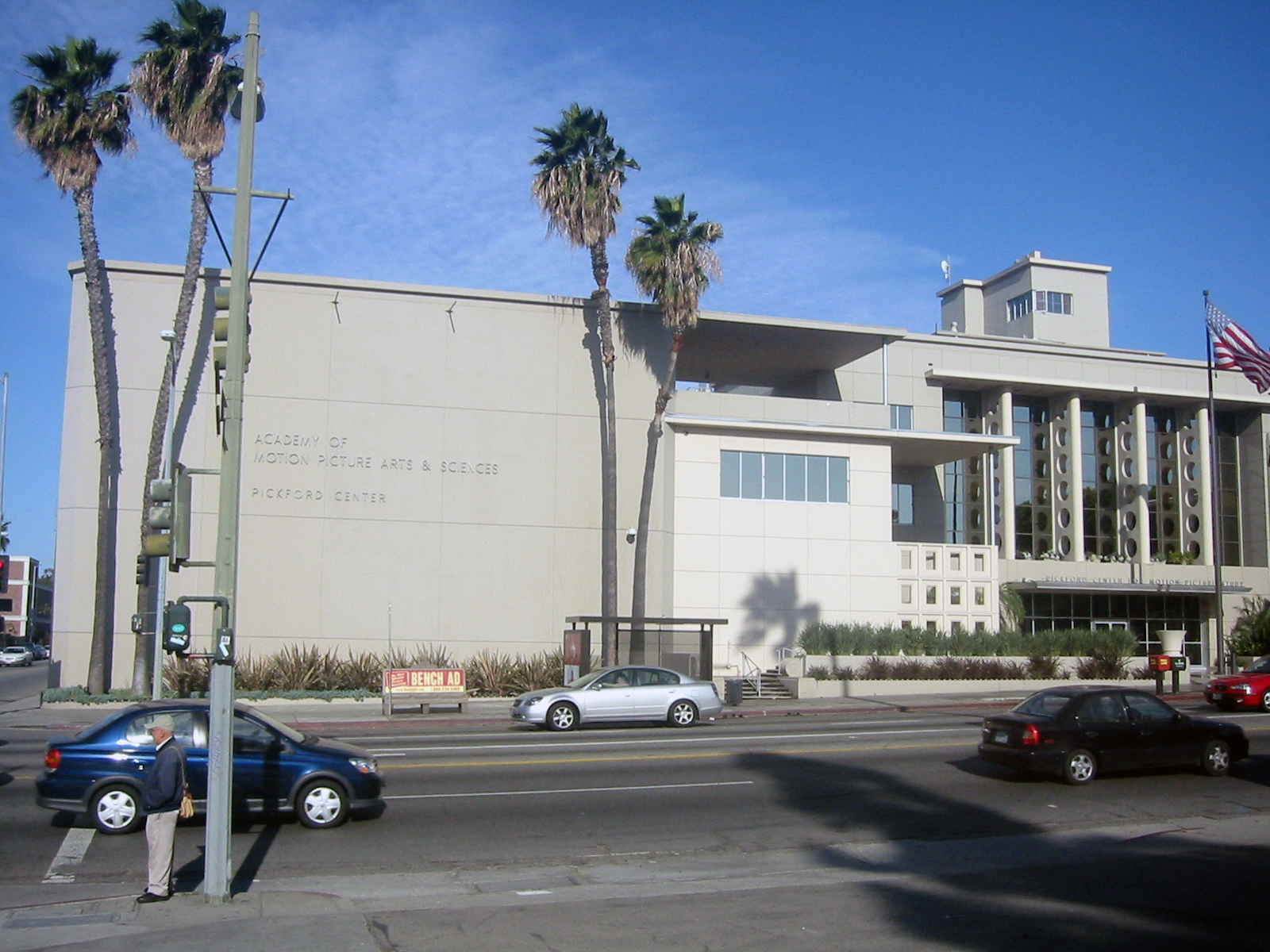
Pickford Center for Motion Picture Study in the Hollywood district

The Pickford Center for Motion Picture Study, located at 1313 Vine Street in Hollywood and named for legendary actress and Academy co-founder Mary Pickford, houses several Academy departments, including the Academy Film Archive, the Science and Technology Council, Student Academy Awards and Grants, and the Nicholl Fellowships in Screenwriting. The building, originally dedicated on August 18, 1948, is the oldest surviving structure in Hollywood that was designed specifically with television in mind. Additionally, it is the location of the Linwood Dunn Theater, which seats 286 people.

==== Fairbanks Center for Motion Picture Study ====
Fairbanks Center for Motion Picture Study

The Fairbanks Center for Motion Picture Study, opened in 1991, is located at 333 S. La Cienega Boulevard in Beverly Hills and is named for legendary actor and Academy co-founder Douglas Fairbanks. It is home to the Academy's Margaret Herrick Library, a world-renowned, non-circulating reference and research collection devoted to the history and development of the motion picture as an art form and an industry. Established in 1928, the library is open to the public and used year-round by students, scholars, historians and industry professionals. The library is named for Margaret Herrick, the Academy's first librarian who also played a major role in the Academy's first televised broadcast, helping to turn the Oscar ceremony into a major annual televised event.

The building itself was built in 1928, where it was originally built to be a water treatment plant for Beverly Hills. Its "bell tower" held water-purifying hardware.

==== Academy Museum of Motion Pictures ====
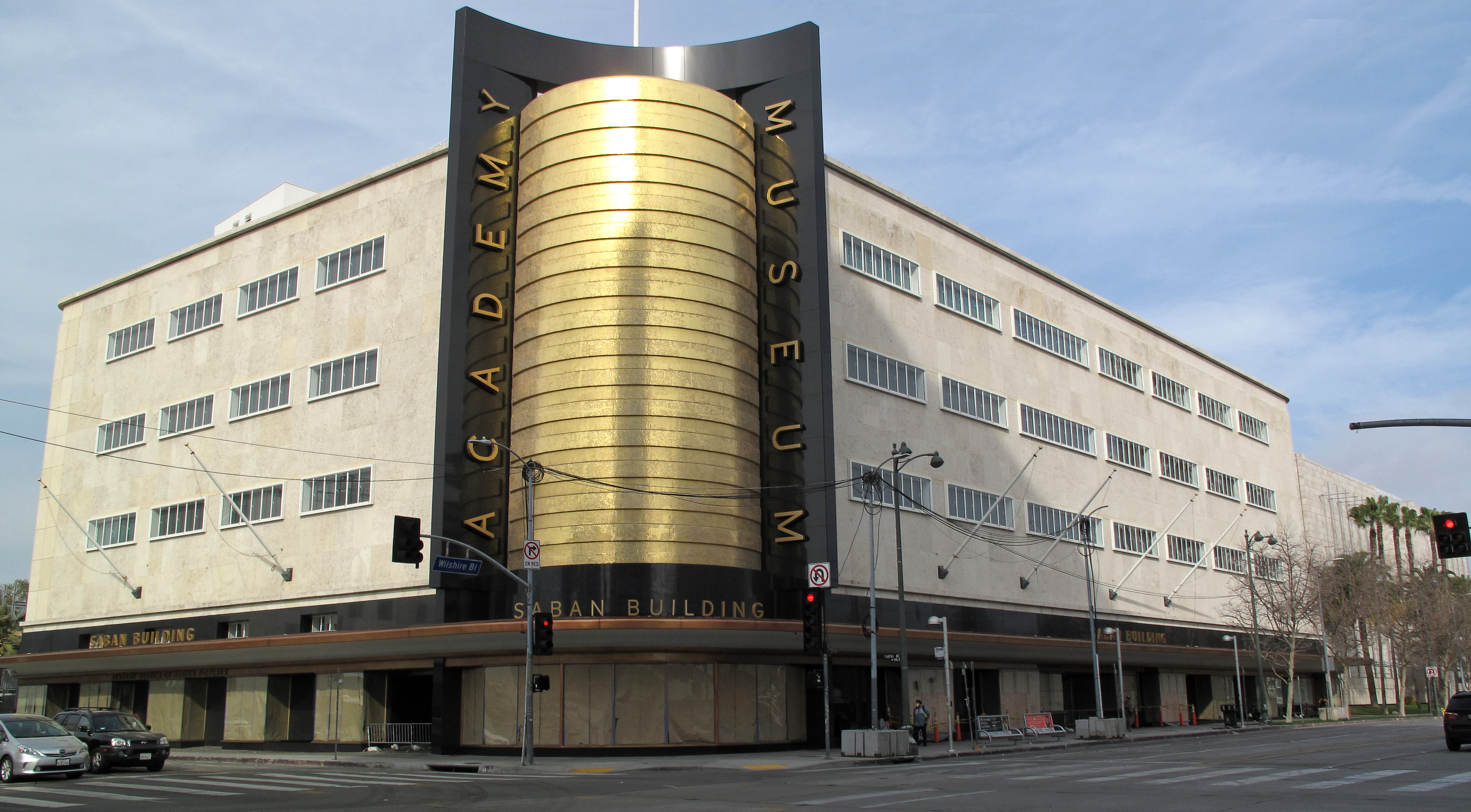
Academy Museum of Motion Pictures located on the Museum Row

The Academy Museum of Motion Pictures, the newest facility associated with the Academy, is the United States' first large-scale museum dedicated to the film industry. It opened to the public on September 30, 2021, and it contains over 300,000 square feet (28,000 m^{2}) of galleries, exhibition spaces, movie theaters, educational areas, and special event spaces. The museum is located at 6067 Wilshire Boulevard at Fairfax Avenue in Los Angeles, in the historic May Company Building, now named the Saban Building.

=== Former ===
==== Academy Theater in New York ====
The Academy also had a New York City-based East Coast showcase theater, the Academy Theater at Lighthouse International. The 220-seat venue was redesigned in 2011 by renowned theater designer Theo Kalomirakis, including an extensive installation of new audio and visual equipment. The theater was in the East 59th Street headquarters of Lighthouse International, a non-profit vision loss organization. In July 2015, it was announced that the Academy was forced to move out, due to Lighthouse International selling the property the theater was in.

== Membership ==
Academy membership is divided into 19 branches, for crafts ranging from Actors to Writers, and the Artist's Representatives category, for those who work in motion pictures as a representative. As of 2024, the Academy's confirmed membership is 10,894, comprising 9,905 voting members, 949 non-voting emeritus members, and 40 associate members. The largest Academy branch is the actors branch, which in 2024 stood at 1,258 members, or 12.7% of the total membership.

Membership in the Academy comes only through an invitation from the Board of Governors. An individual may be recommended to the board by two current members in the branch they would prospectively join, and anyone who is nominated for an Oscar is considered for membership by special committees of the various branches. Each spring, the Board will meet to consider who to extend invitations to, and new invitees are announced in a press release. Once accepted, membership does not expire. In 1994, actor and comedian Rodney Dangerfield was denied membership.

In 2012, the Los Angeles Times, sampling over 5,000 of the Academy's then-5,765 members, found that membership at the time was 94% white, 77% male, 86% age 50 or older, and had a median age of 62. A third of members were previous winners or nominees of Academy Awards themselves. On June 29, 2016, a paradigm shift began in the Academy's selection process, resulting in a new class comprising 46% women and 41% people of color. The effort to diversify the Academy was led by social activist and Broadway Black managing-editor April Reign. Reign created the Twitter hashtag #OscarsSoWhite as a means of criticizing the dearth of non-white nominees for the 2015 Academy Awards. Though the hashtag drew widespread media attention, the Academy remained obstinate on the matter of adopting a resolution that would make demonstrable its efforts to increase diversity. With the 2016 Academy Awards, many, including April Reign, were dismayed by the Academy's indifference about representation and inclusion, as the 2016 nominees were once again entirely white. April Reign revived #OscarsSoWhite, and renewed her campaign efforts, which included multiple media appearances and interviews with reputable news outlets. As a result of Reign's campaign, the discourse surrounding representation and recognition in film spread beyond the United States and became a global discussion. Faced with mounting pressure to expand the Academy membership, the Academy capitulated and instituted new policies to ensure that future Academy membership invitations would better represent the demographics of modern film-going audiences. The A2020 initiative was announced in January 2016 to double the number of women and people of color in membership by 2020.

Members screen new films at the Samuel Goldwyn Theater in Beverly Hills, California, in addition to other facilities in New York City and London. Since 2021, films in contention for awards are made available to members through a designated streaming app, replacing physical screeners.

=== Expulsions ===
Five people are known to have been expelled from the Academy. Academy officials acknowledge that other members have been expelled in the past, most for selling their Oscar tickets, but no numbers are available.

- February 3, 2004 – Actor Carmine Caridi was expelled for copyright infringement. He was accused of leaking screeners that had been sent to him.
- October 13, 2017 – Producer Harvey Weinstein was expelled for "sexually predatory behavior and workplace harassment" after an emergency meeting held on October 13, 2017.
- May 1, 2018 – Actor Bill Cosby and director Roman Polanski were expelled "in accordance with the organization's Standards of Conduct". Cosby had been convicted of sexual assault one week earlier, while Polanski had been convicted in 1977 of unlawful sexual intercourse with a minor.
- March 17, 2021 – Cinematographer Adam Kimmel was expelled in 2021 after a Variety story exposed the fact that he is a registered sex offender.

=== Resignations ===
The following members have voluntarily resigned from the organization:

- Sound engineer Tom Fleischman resigned from the Academy on March 5, 2022, citing changes to the broadcast of the 94th Academy Awards ceremony, during which eight award categories – including Best Sound – were not presented live, but rather during the commercial breaks. Production sound mixer Peter Kurland also resigned his membership on March 23, 2022, citing the changes.
- Actor Will Smith announced his resignation from the Academy on April 1, 2022, five days after his onstage slap of Chris Rock, one of the ceremony's presenters, during the 94th Academy Awards.

=== Rejections ===
The following filmmakers have turned down Academy Membership:

- Director Ryan Coogler was invited to join the Academy in 2016 but declined. His reasoning was that he did not like judging films.
- Star Wars creator George Lucas declined membership in the Academy. The Academy has identified him as one of the notable people who declined membership.

== Branches ==
The branches of the Academy are:

1. Actors
2. Animation (created from former Short Films and Feature Animation Branch)
3. Casting Directors
4. Cinematographers
5. Costume Designers (created from former Art Directors Branch)
6. Directors
7. Documentary
8. Executives
9. Film Editors
10. Makeup Artists and Hairstylists
11. Marketing and Public Relations
12. Music
13. Producers
14. Production and Technology
15. Production Design (created from former Art Directors Branch)
16. Short Films (created from former Short Films and Feature Animation Branch)
17. Sound
18. Visual Effects
19. Writers

In addition, the Academy has a separate category for membership for artist representatives.

== Board of governors ==
As of June 2024, the board of governors consists of 55 governors. The Makeup Artists and Hairstylists Branch, created in 2006, had only one governor until July 2013. The Casting Directors Branch, created in 2013, elected its first three governors in Fall 2013. The board of governors is responsible for corporate management, control, and general policies. The board of governors also appoints a CEO to supervise the administrative activities of the Academy.

== Original 36 founders ==
From the original formal banquet, which was hosted by Louis B. Mayer in 1927, everyone invited became a founder of the Academy:

Actors

- Richard Barthelmess
- Jack Holt
- Conrad Nagel
- Milton Sills
- Douglas Fairbanks
- Harold Lloyd
- Mary Pickford

Directors

- Cecil B. DeMille
- Frank Lloyd
- Henry King
- Fred Niblo
- John M. Stahl
- Raoul Walsh

Lawyers

- Edwin Loeb
- George W. Cohen

Producers

- Fred Beetson
- Charles H. Christie
- Sid Grauman
- Milton E. Hoffman
- Jesse L. Lasky
- M. C. Levee
- Louis B. Mayer
- Joseph M. Schenck
- Irving Thalberg
- Harry Warner
- Jack L. Warner
- Harry Rapf

Technicians

- J. Arthur Ball
- Cedric Gibbons
- Roy Pomeroy

Writers

- Joseph W. Farnham
- Benjamin Glazer
- Jeanie MacPherson
- Bess Meredyth
- Carey Wilson
- Frank E. Woods

== Presidents ==
Presidents are elected for one-year terms and may not be elected for more than four consecutive terms.

No.	Name	Term
1	Douglas Fairbanks	1927–1929
2	William C. DeMille	1929–1931
3	M. C. Levee	1931–1932
4	Conrad Nagel	1932–1933
5	J. Theodore Reed	1933–1934
6	Frank Lloyd	1934–1935
7	Frank Capra	1935–1939
8	Walter Wanger (1st time)	1939–1941
9	Bette Davis	1941 (resigned after two months)
10	Walter Wanger (2nd time)	1941–1945
11	Jean Hersholt	1945–1949
12	Charles Brackett	1949–1955
13	George Seaton	1955–1958
14	George Stevens	1958–1959
15	B. B. Kahane	1959–1960 (died)
16	Valentine Davies	1960–1961 (died)
17	Wendell Corey	1961–1963
18	Arthur Freed	1963–1967
19	Gregory Peck	1967–1970
20	Daniel Taradash	1970–1973
21	Walter Mirisch	1973–1977
22	Howard W. Koch	1977–1979
23	Fay Kanin	1979–1983
24	Gene Allen	1983–1985
25	Robert Wise	1985–1988
26	Richard Kahn	1988–1989
27	Karl Malden	1989–1992
28	Robert Rehme (1st time)	1992–1993
29	Arthur Hiller	1993–1997
30	Robert Rehme (2nd time)	1997–2001
31	Frank Pierson	2001–2005
32	Sid Ganis	2005–2009
33	Tom Sherak	2009–2012
34	Hawk Koch	2012–2013
35	Cheryl Boone Isaacs	2013–2017
36	John Bailey	2017–2019
37	David Rubin	2019–2022
38	Janet Yang	2022–2025
39	Lynette Howell Taylor	2025–present

Source: "Academy Story". Academy of Motion Picture Arts and Sciences. Archived from the original on April 1, 2015.

== Current administration ==
Academy officers

- President – Lynette Howell Taylor
- Vice President / Secretary – Howard A. Rodman
- Vice President / Treasurer – Simon Kilmurry
- Vice President – Lesley Barber
- Vice President – Jennifer Fox
- Vice President – Lou Diamond Phillips
- Chief Executive Officer – Bill Kramer

Governors

- Actors Branch – Marlee Matlin, Lou Diamond Phillips, Rita Wilson
- Animation Branch – Jinko Gotoh, Marlon West
- Casting Directors Branch – Richard Hicks, Kim Taylor-Coleman, Debra Zane
- Cinematographers Branch – Dion Beebe, Paul Cameron, Ellen Kuras
- Costume Designers Branch – Eduardo Castro, Isis Mussenden, Daniel Orlandi
- Directors Branch – Patricia Cardoso, Ava DuVernay, Jason Reitman
- Documentary Branch – Chris Hegedus, Simon Kilmurry, Jean Tsien
- Executives Branch – Pam Abdy, Peter Kujawski, Hannah Minghella
- Film Editors Branch – Nancy Richardson, Stephen E. Rivkin, Terilyn A. Shropshire
- Makeup Artists and Hairstylists Branch – Linda Flowers, Gerald Quist, Gigi Williams
- Marketing and Public Relations Branch – David Dinerstein, Laura C. Kim, Christina Kounelias
- Music Branch – Lesley Barber, Carter Burwell, Richard Gibbs
- Producers Branch – Jason Blum, Jennifer Fox, Lynette Howell Taylor
- Production and Technology Branch – Wendy Aylsworth
- Production Design Branch – K. K. Barrett, Kalina Ivanov, Missy Parker
- Short Films Branch – Chris Tashima
- Sound Branch – Peter J. Devlin, Andy Nelson, Mark Stoeckinger
- Visual Effects Branch – Rob Bredow, Brooke Breton, Andrew Roberts
- Writers Branch – Larry Karaszewski, Howard A. Rodman, Dana Stevens
- Governors-at-large (nominated by the President and elected by the board) – Haifaa al-Mansour, Effie T. Brown, Annie Chang

== See also ==
- Academy of Television Arts & Sciences
- American Academy of Arts and Sciences
- American Film Institute
- British Academy of Film and Television Arts
- Académie des Arts et Techniques du Cinéma
- Motion Picture Association of America
- National Film Registry
