= Marlon West =

American animator

Marlon West is an effects animator who is Head of Effects Animation and Visual Effects Supervisor for Walt Disney Animation Studios. He has twice been nominated for Annie Awards, winning for his effects animation work on Moana in 2017.

== Early life ==
West became interested in film and animation as a child. He often made short films with an 8mm camera, casting neighborhood kids in his films. He was also interested in making stop-motion films in the style of Jason and the Argonauts. West graduated from University City High School in University City, Missouri in 1981. He then attended Columbia College Chicago where he got a Bachelors of Fine Arts degree in Filmmaking and a Bachelors of Arts degree in Creative Writing in 1985.

== Career ==
=== Early career ===
After West graduated from Columbia College Chicago, he began working at Hyperion Studios' now-defunct animation division. He worked on the company's final two feature films: Rover Dangerfield and Bebe's Kids. He then worked as a freelance animator on commercials and music videos — for acts including The Beastie Boys and Paula Abdul — before starting as a trainee for Walt Disney Animation Studios in 1994. His first project for the company was 1994's The Lion King, where he was an effects animator.

=== Current career ===
He is currently the Head of Effects Animation and is a Visual Effects Animator at Walt Disney Animation Studios. West is a member of the Academy of Motion Pictures Arts and Sciences and is on the Board of Governors, specifically the Animation branch.

=== Art ===
In 2020 in the wake of the George Floyd murder, West was inspired to create a series of what he called "Ink Tributes" to civil rights heroes and victims of police brutality. He started out by posting his drawings on his social media pages and he has since created over 40 of these tributes. Some of his first tributes were to Breonna Taylor, George Floyd, and Vice President Kamala Harris. West's own son inspired two of his tributes for Nina Pop and Tony McDade. West's son inspired these portraits because he is also transgender. His art was debuted at the Museum of Social Justice in Los Angeles on August 13, 2022.

== Filmography ==
=== Films ===
Title	Year	Contribution
Zootopia 2	2025	Visual Effects Supervisor
Iwaju	2024	Visual Effects Supervisor
Encanto	2021	Head of Effects Animation
Frozen II	2019	Head of Effects Animation
Moana	2016	Head of Effects Animation
The Story of Frozen: Making a Disney Animated Classic	2014	Self Credited
Big Hero 6	2014	Departmental Leadership
Frozen	2013	Effects Supervisor, Head Of Effects Animation
Winnie the Pooh	2011	Visual Effects Supervisor
The Princess and the Frog	2009	Effects Animation Supervisor
Meet the Robinsons	2007	Digital Effects Artist
Curious George	2006	Visual Effects Animator
Chicken Little	2005	Effects Animator
Home on the Range	2004	Visual Effects Supervisor
Atlantis: The Lost Empire	2001	Visual Effects Supervisor
The Emperor's New Groove	2000	Additional Visual Effects Animator
Fantasia 2000	1999	Assistant Effects Supervisor (segments: Rhapsody in Blue)
Tarzan	1999	Visual Effects Animator
Mulan	1998	Additional Visual Effects Animator
Hercules	1997	Visual Effects Animator
The Hunchback of Notre Dame	1996	Visual Effects Animator
Pocahontas	1995	Effects Animator
The Lion King	1994	Effects Animator
FernGully: The Last Rainforest	1992	Additional Effects Animator
Bebe's Kids	1992	Additional Character Designer, Special Effects Animator
Rover Dangerfield	1991	Special Effects Animator

=== TV series ===
Title	Year	Contribution
Iwájú	2024	Visual Effects Supervisor (1 episode, 2024)
Quack Pack	1996	Special Effects (1 episode, 1996), Art Coordinator (1 episode, 1996) Stunt Double or Nothing (Nov 27, 1996) Season 1, Episode 38 - Special Effects Hit the Road, Backwater Jack (Nov 19, 1996) Season 1, Episode 34 - Art Coordinator
Britannica's Tales Around the World	1993	Ink And Paint (1 episode, 1993) Hansel and Gretel/The Woodcutter's Wealthy Sister/Pedro and the Monster (1993) - Ink And Paint (segments: Pedro and the Monster)

=== Short films ===
Title	Year	Contribution
Feast	2014	Head Of Effects Animation
Paperman	2012	Final Line Animator
How to Hook Up Your Home Theater	2007	Artistic Coordinator, Effects Supervisor
How to Haunt a House	1999	Visual Effects Animator
The Itsy Bitsy Spider	1992	Special Effects Animation
The Lion and the Mouse	1988	Principal Animator

=== Other credits ===
Title	Year	Contribution
Walt Disney Animation Studios Short Films Collection	2015	Final Line Animator (segments: Paperman), Artistic Coordinator (segments: How to Hook up Your Home Theater), Effects Supervisor/head Of Effects Animation (segments: How to Hook up Your Home Theater", & "Feast)
The Making of 'Atlantis: The Lost City'	2002	Self credited - Artistic Supervisor, Visual Effects
Shadrach by the Beastie Boys	1989	Painter

=== Acting roles ===
Title	Year	Contribution
The Princess and the Frog (video game)	2009	Voice
The Princess and the Frog	2009	Additional Voices
Eternity	1989	Voice

=== Awards and nominations ===
Award	Award name	Movie	Year
Annie Awards	Outstanding Achievement in Animated Effects in an Animated Production	Moana	2016
Annie Awards	Nominated for Outstanding Individual Achievement for Effects Animation	Atlantis: The Lost Empire	2001
