= Art Kane =

American photographer (1925–1995)

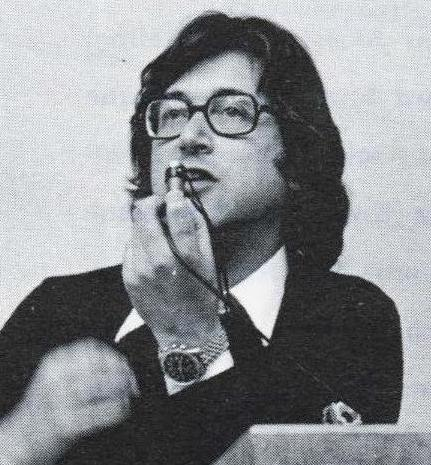
- Kane in 1974
- Born: Arthur Kanofsky; April 9, 1925; New York City, U.S.
- Died: February 3, 1995 (aged 69); Garrard County, Kentucky, U.S.
- Occupation: Photographer
- Years active: 1950s–1995
- Notable work: A Great Day in Harlem
- Children: Jonathan Kane, Nikolas, Anthony

Art Kane (born Arthur Kanofsky; April 9, 1925 – February 3, 1995) was an American fashion and music photographer active from the 1950s through the early 1990s. He created many portraits of contemporary musicians, including Bob Dylan, Jefferson Airplane, Sonny and Cher, Aretha Franklin, Frank Zappa, Jim Morrison, Janis Joplin, the Rolling Stones, and The Who.

== Life and career ==
Kane was born in New York City to Russian Jewish parents. Wanting to become an illustrator, he attended the Cooper Union School of Art and Architecture before joining the U.S. Army during the Second World War. He served in an unusual Army deception unit known as the Ghost Army, an incubator for many young artists. At age 26, he became the art director for Seventeen magazine, one of the youngest art directors of a major publication. He began to explore his passion for photography, eventually studying under the legendary Alexey Brodovitch, who "taught a generation of photographers [...] that the creative process should be a full exploration about what was unique in one's own vision". In 1958, he received an assignment from Esquire magazine that launched his career as a photographer, when 57 jazz musicians assembled in Harlem, New York for a group portrait. Later known as A Great Day in Harlem, the resulting image has been described as "the most iconic photograph in jazz history", and was the subject of Jean Bach's 1994 documentary film of the same name.

His work was provocative, experimental, and playful, sometimes rejected by magazines for nudity or irreverence. Kane said of his approach to portraiture: "If you want to shoot a performer then grab them, own them, you have to own people, then twist them into what you want to say about them." In the book The Nikon Image, he was quoted in as saying: "I've always considered myself an illustrator, a literate photographer interested in producing images that reflect the essence of an idea. [...] I want to interpret the human scene rather than simply record it."

Kane created and directed the film A Time to Play, a unique three-screen film commissioned by the US Information Agency that was shown in the US Pavilion at Expo '67.

In the book De Lorean: Stainless Steel Illusion, Kane is credited for the photograph of John DeLorean with the DeLorean sports car, used in the only magazine advertisement the company ever ran. In 1989, the Art Kane Photo Workshops were created in Cape May, New Jersey. They were week-long workshops with notable photographers.

Examples of Kane's work can be found in the permanent collections of the Museum of Modern Art and Metropolitan Museum of Art in New York. Amongst his many awards, he was named Photographer of the Year by the American Society of Magazine Photographers (ASMP) in 1964, and was the recipient of an ASMP Lifetime Achievement Award in 1984. A compilation of his work was published in 2014, and a book produced to mark the 60th anniversary of A Great Day in Harlem in 2018, with forewords by Quincy Jones and Benny Golson.

In 1995, Kane, 69, died of a self-inflicted gunshot at his former wife Millicent Kane's house in Garrard County, Kentucky. In addition to the drummer Jonathan Kane, his children also included sons Nikolas and Anthony.
