= Jan Domela =

American painter

- Born: August 22, 1894; The Hague
- Died: August 1, 1973 (aged 78); Santa Monica, California

Jan Marinus Domela (August 22, 1894 in The Hague – August 1, 1973 in Santa Monica, California) was an American artist and illustrator.

Johan Domela Nieuwenhuis, also Jan Marinus Domela became interested in art while at boarding school in Switzerland. While visiting his sister in California he studied at the Los Angeles School of Illustration and Painting and the Mark Hopkins Art Institute; back in the Netherlands in 1925, he attended the Rijksakademie in Amsterdam before completing his studies at the Académie Julian in Paris.

After returning to California in 1928 Domela was made the chief matte painter at Paramount Studios, and was chief artist in the special effects department until 1968. Creating landscapes for most of the movies produced by Paramount for over thirty years, he received several Academy Awards for his work.

Domela was part of the production team who received an Academy Honorary Award at the 11th Academy Awards for their efforts on the Paramount film Spawn of the North. Domela exhibited his own landscape paintings of subjects such as the Monterey Peninsula, the California Sierras, the Alps, and Monhegan Island, at venues including the Los Angeles County Museum.
