= Jean Bach =

American film director

Jean Bach (September 27, 1918 – May 27, 2013) was an American documentary film director, radio producer, and jazz aficionado. Bach directed the 1994 documentary, A Great Day in Harlem, based on a 1958 photograph of the same name.

== Biography ==
Bach was born Jean Enzinger in Chicago on September 27, 1918, and raised in Milwaukee. She made frequent trips to Harlem and the Apollo Theater as a student at Vassar College. She became a fixture in New York's jazz scene for the rest of her life.

The black-and-white photograph which formed the basis of A Great Day in Harlem is a portrait of fifty-seven prominent jazz musicians who were photographed in front of a brownstone at 17 East 126th Street in the Harlem neighborhood of upper Manhattan. Bach learned that jazz bassist Milt Hinton had a home movie from the day of the photo shoot in 1958. She acquired Hinton's home movie and used it for archival footage for her own film, A Great Day in Harlem, an hour-long documentary released in 1994. Her film won the top award from the Chicago International Film Festival and earned an Academy Award for Documentary Feature nomination in 1995.

Jean Bach died at her home in Manhattan on May 27, 2013, at the age of 94. Her husband, Bob Bach, a production coordinator on What's My Line?, whom she married in 1948, died in 1985.
