= Academy Film Archive =

Part of the Academy Foundation

- Formation: 1944; 82 years ago
- Founded at: Hollywood, California, U.S.
- Remarks: Organizes and oversees the Academy of Motion Picture Arts and Sciences' educational and cultural activities

The Academy Film Archive is part of the Academy Foundation, established in 1944 in the U.S. with the purpose of organizing and overseeing the Academy of Motion Picture Arts and Sciences' educational and cultural activities, including the preservation of motion picture history. Although the existing incarnation of the Academy Film Archive began in 1991, the Academy of Motion Picture Arts and Sciences acquired its first film in 1929.

== Preservation ==
Located in Hollywood, California at the Pickford Center for Motion Picture Study, the Archive has a diverse range of moving image material. The Archive's collection comprises 107,000 titles and 230,000 separate items, including early American cinema, a vast collection of documentary films, filmed and taped interviews, amateur and private home movies of Hollywood legends, makeup and sound test reels, and a wide selection of experimental film, as well as Academy Award-winning films, Academy Award-nominated films, and a complete collection of every Academy Awards show since 1949.

Since acquiring the Packard Humanities Institute Collection, the Archive has the world's largest known trailer collection. The Archive is also concerned with the preservation and restoration of films, as well as new technologies and methods of preservation, restoring over 1100 titles of historical and artistic importance.

== Notable preserved projects ==
- Barbara Kopple's Harlan County, USA (1976)
- Lewis Milestone's The Front Page (1931)
- William Wellman's Wings (1927)
- Joseph L. Mankiewicz's All About Eve (1950)
- Henry Koster's The Robe (1953)
- Many Stan Brakhage films from the original elements
- Curtis Harrington's Night Tide (1961; with support from the Film Foundation)
- Eighteen films by Satyajit Ray (including The Apu Trilogy)
- Akira Kurosawa's Rashomon (1950; in conjunction with the National Film Center of the National Museum of Modern Art, Tokyo and Kadokawa Pictures, funding provided by Kadokawa Culture Promotion Foundation and The Film Foundation; won the 2009 National Society of Film Critics's Heritage Award)
- Robert Drew's Primary (1960)
- Howard Smith and Sarah Kernochan's Marjoe (1972)

== Access ==
The Archive offers access to its collections to researchers and scholars. Based on availability, preservation status and condition of the materials, visitors may visit the Pickford Center for Motion Picture Study to arrange appointments through the Access Center. Additionally, the Academy Film Archive lends prints to non-profit institutions for screenings.

In some circumstances, the Archive may be able to make collection materials available for licensing.
