= Army Girl =

1938 film

- Film poster
- Directed by: George Nicholls Jr.
- Written by: Charles L. Clifford; Barry Trivers; Samuel Ornitz
- Produced by: Sol C. Siegel
- Starring: Madge Evans; Preston Foster
- Cinematography: Ernest Miller; Harry J. Wild
- Edited by: William Morgan
- Music by: Victor Young; Alberto Colombo
- Production company: Republic Pictures
- Distributed by: Republic Pictures
- Release date: August 11, 1938
- Running time: 80 minutes
- Country: United States
- Language: English

Army Girl (also released as The Last of the Cavalry) is a 1938 American comedy film directed by George Nicholls Jr. and starring Madge Evans and Preston Foster. It was a high budget film by Republic Pictures.

== Plot ==
Captain Dike Conger, an officer with the Thirty-first Cavalry Regiment is instructed to determine whether the unit should use tanks instead of horses. Along with his mechanic, Master Sergeant “Three Star” Hennessy, Conger is opposed by those who want to continue using horses.

Meanwhile, Conger agrees to go on a blind date arranged by his friend Captain Bob Marvin on the condition that his date be a civilian, not an "army girl", i.e., the daughter of an officer or soldier. Due to a misunderstanding, his date turns out to be Julie Armstrong, daughter of camp commander Colonel Armstrong who is among those not wanting to convert the unit from horses to tanks. Despite his misgivings about "army girls", Conger falls in love with Julie.

Subsequently, a contest shows that tanks are more effective thank horses. As the regiment awaits a final decision from Washington, Conger and Julie decide to marry, but as Conger is about to tell Colonel Armstrong, the colonel reveals the decision and then tell Congers he will replace him as post commander. Julie, angered by the decision, breaks the engagement.

Upset at the decision to replace horses, Sergeant Ross, a rival of Three Star, sabotages the tank which is to carry Conger and Three Star at the transition ceremony. On the day of the ceremony, the colonel decides to drive to the ceremony with Three Star instead of Conger and both are killed in the wreck caused by Ross’s actions. Captain Joe Schuyler, a rival for Julie's affections, reaches the tank, and hears Three Star's dying words implicating Ross, but he decides not to tell anyone. Instead, Conger is court martialed for negligence and held responsible for the accident. Schuyler then proposes to Julie. When she refuses him, he realizes that she never will love him. He then forces Ross to confess before military judges, exonerating Conger who reconciles with Julie.

== Cast ==
- Madge Evans as Julie Armstrong
- Preston Foster as Captain Dike Conger
- James Gleason as Master Sergeant "Three Star" Hennessy
- H.B. Warner as Colonel Armstrong
- Ruth Donnelly as Leila Kennett
- Neil Hamilton as Captain Joe Schuyler
- Heather Angel as Mrs. Gwen Bradley
- Billy Gilbert as Cantina Pete
- Ralph Morgan as Major Hal Kennett
- Barbara Pepper as Riki Thomas
- Ralph Byrd as Captain Bob Marvin
- Guinn "Big Boy" Williams as First Sergeant Ross
- Robert Warwick as Brigadier General Matthews

== Accolades ==
The film was nominated for three Academy Awards:

- Cinematography (Ernest Miller, Harry Wild)
- Original Score (Victor Young)
- Sound Recording (Charles L. Lootens)
