= Lela E. Rogers =

American screenwriter (1891–1977)

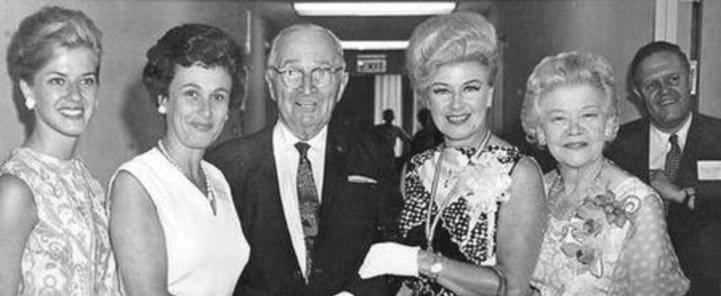
- President Harry Truman with (to his left) Ginger Rogers and Lela E. Rogers at the 1964 Ginger Rogers Day celebration
- Born: Lela Emogene Owens; December 25, 1891; Council Bluffs, Iowa, US
- Died: May 25, 1977 (aged 85); Palm Springs, California, US
- Other names: Lela Liebrand
- Occupation(s): Screenwriter, journalist, producer, film editor
- Spouses: William Eddins McMath (m. 1909; div. 1914) John Logan Rogers (m. 1920)
- Children: Ginger Rogers
- Relatives: Phyllis Fraser (niece); Vinton Hayworth (brother-in-law)

Lela E. Rogers (née Lela Emogene Owens; December 25, 1891 – May 25, 1977), sometimes known as Lela Liebrand, was an American journalist, film producer, film editor, and screenwriter. She was the mother of actress Ginger Rogers.

== Biography ==
=== Beginnings ===
Rogers was born on Christmas Day in 1891 to Walter Winfield Owens and Wilma Saphrona Owens (née Ball) in Council Bluffs, Iowa, the oldest of four daughters. She attended grade school in Kansas City, Missouri, where her family finally settled down, and then went to business school to become a stenographer. Her first job was at a furniture store in Kansas City when she was 16.

One sister, Verda Virginia Clendenin (née Owens; formerly Brown Nichols) (1895–1958), was the mother of actress Phyllis Fraser (born Helen Brown Nichols) and another sister, Jean Hayworth (née Owens; 1905–1995), was the wife of Vinton Hayworth and sister-in-law of Volga Hayworth.

In 1909, aged 17, she married William Eddins McMath, an electrical engineer, and in 1911, the couple moved to Independence, Missouri, where she worked as a newspaper reporter. It was there that she gave birth to her daughter, Virginia, or Ginger for short. After her marriage to McMath ended, she married Raymond Liebrand of Kansas City a business owner in Kansas City.

She would eventually become a theater reporter for The Fort Worth Record in Fort Worth, Texas, where Ginger was first raised.

=== Screenwriting endeavors ===
After obtaining a divorce when Ginger was 3, Lela eventually moved to Hollywood, and by 1916, she was writing scripts under the name Lela Liebrand. At this time, she wrote stories for child actress Baby Marie Osborne, among other credits. She also traveled to Kansas to write, direct, and produce a tourism film while working for Pathé.

=== Service with Marines ===
During World War I, she was one of the first women to enlist in the Marine Corps, where she handled publicity. She eventually became the only female editor of Marine newspaper, Leatherneck. At this time, she served as secretary to Col. Albert S. McLemore. While enlisted, she also wrote and directed about 75,000 feet of film for the Marines. She married John Logan Rogers in Kansas City in 1920.

=== Hollywood career ===
She served as her daughter's manager, and acquired a reputation as a stage mom. At one point, she drew ire from the IRS for not paying taxes on her cut of Ginger's earnings.

During the late 1930s and early 1940s, she worked as an assistant to Charles Koerner, RKO's vice president of production, and was put in charge of the studio's new talent. She soon parlayed this role into the role as a producer, supervising production on Ginger's films. In 1942, she played the mother of Ginger's character in Billy Wilder's comedy The Major and the Minor.

For a time, she ran her own acting school on the RKO lot, where she taught pupils like Betty Grable and Lucille Ball. Ball would later credit Lela for making her into the actress she became.

=== Later life ===
In 1947, Lela—a founding member of the Motion Picture Alliance for the Preservation of American Ideals and a devout Christian Scientist—testified before the House Un-American Activities Committee. At the time, there were rumors that she was dating the FBI's J. Edgar Hoover.

She died in 1977 in Palm Springs.

=== Legacy ===
The house at 100 W Moore street where Lela gave birth to Ginger Rogers was restored by Gene and Marge Padgitt in 2018 and opened for two years as the Owens-Rogers Museum. Due to the COVID-19 pandemic, the museum was closed and the house was sold. The Padgitts are in the process of creating a virtual museum.

== Selected filmography ==
- The Little Patriot (1917)
- The Lady in the Library (1917)
- The Understudy (1917)
- The Climber (1917) (short)
- Bonnie Annie Laurie (1918)
- Cupid by Proxy (1918)
- Women Won't Tell (1932)
- The Major and the Minor (1942, acting role)
- Tanga-Tika (1953)
