= Owens-Rogers Museum =

Museum in Independence, Missouri, U.S.

Coordinates: 39.102572°N 94.415462°W

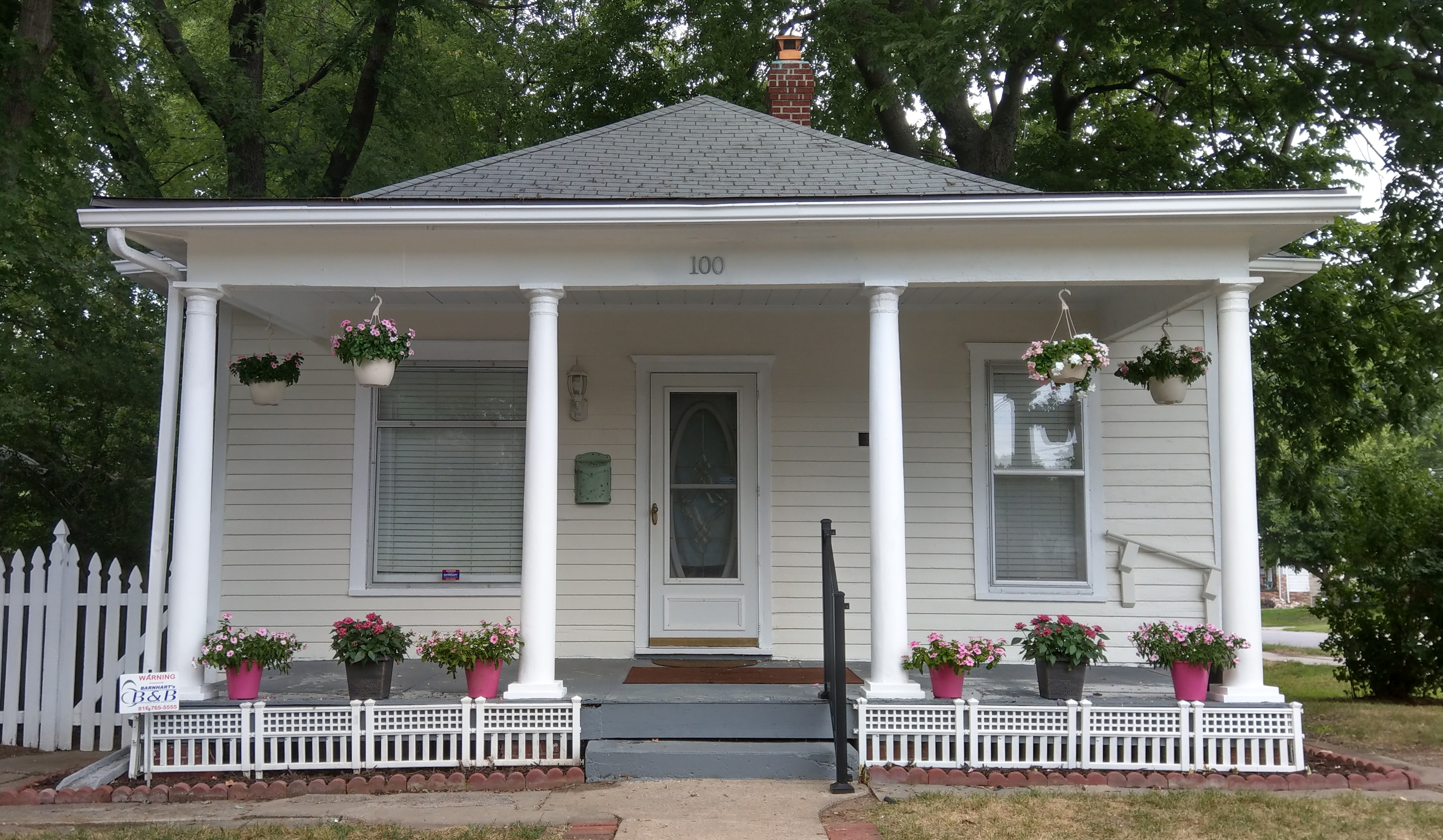
The Owens-Rogers Museum in 2018

The Owens-Rogers Museum was the home of Hollywood screenwriter and producer Lela E. Rogers and is the birthplace and childhood home of the American actress, dancer, and singer, Ginger Rogers. The home was a tourist attraction and museum which has since been closed to the public.

== History ==
This house and the one to the west were purchased by Oscar Mindrup in 1906. From the time of construction until 2016, the home was owned by several families, some who are mentioned in the book 100 West Moore Street by Liana Twente and Audrey Elder.

The home sat on the market unwanted for months at an asking price of $20,000, then sold to a young couple who lived in the home for 5 years. They sold it in 2016 to Three Trails Cottages, LLC. for $36,500. On February 29, 2016, the home was purchased by Three Trails Cottages, LLC who completed extensive structural restoration work and restored the home to its original condition as closely as possible, preserving the historic features such as the front porch and columns, extensive woodwork, the original corner bathroom sink and clawfoot tub. Also in 2016, Marge Padgitt bought the house and opened it as a museum in 2018. The building was renovated under her ownership. The museum announced closure in 2019, due to a lack of visitors and a lack of space to display memorabilia. It fully closed in 2020, and in 2023, the house was sold to a choir teacher of the North Kansas City School District.
