= 4th Tennessee Cavalry Regiment =

4th Tennessee Cavalry Regiment may refer to:

- 4th Tennessee Cavalry Regiment (Starnes'-McLemore's), a cavalry regiment in the Confederate States Army during the American Civil War, active from May 1862 to April 26, 1865
- 4th Tennessee Cavalry Regiment (Union), a cavalry regiment in the Union Army during the American Civil War, active from July 1862 to July 12, 1865

== See also ==
- 4th Tennessee Infantry Regiment, a Confederate regiment
