= William Sugars McLemore =

William S. McLemore
- Born: February 1, 1830; Franklin, Tennessee, US
- Died: August 7, 1908 (aged 78); Nashville, Tennessee, US
- Military career
- Allegiance: Confederate States of America
- Branch: Confederate States Army
- Rank: Colonel
- Battles: American Civil War; Battle of Thompson's Station; Battle of Chickamauga; Battle of Bentonville

William Sugars McLemore (1830–1908) was a circuit judge for Tennessee and a colonel in the Confederate States Army during the American Civil War.

== Origins ==
William Sugars McLemore was born ten miles south of Franklin, Williamson County, Tennessee, on February 1, 1830, son of A. J. and Bethenia S. (Dabney) McLemore. He was of Scotch-Irish ancestry. His father was born in Williamson County in 1801, and died there in 1849. His mother was born in 1803 and died in 1857. Of thirteen children born, William Sugars was the fifth child and second son. He was reared on the farm and received his education in the common schools of the neighborhood in which he lived.

== Early career ==
At seventeen years of age McLemore entered Transylvania University at Lexington, Kentucky. In 1849 he entered Lebanon Law School, where he graduated in 1851. In the same year he began to practice in Franklin.

In 1856 he was elected as county court clerk, and held this office until 1860. That year he declined re-election and resumed the practice of law.

== Civil War ==
In 1861 he enlisted in Company F, 4th Tennessee Cavalry, Confederate States Army, and was promoted to first lieutenant on October 30 1861, captain at an unknown date, major in March 1863, and colonel on February 23, 1864. He led Dibrell's Cavalry Brigade at the Battle of Bentonville. He was accounted a brave and gallant soldier. In 1864, an examining board recommended him for promotion as "gallant and meritorious".

According to the diary of his daughter Bethenia ("Thenie"), he was never wounded. But he had three horses shot from under him in the course of the war—once, at the Battle of Thompson's Station, the bullet passed through his canteen and was diverted by the water; his horse was shot through.

== Later career ==
In 1865 he returned home and immediately began the practice of law. He continued this until 1872 when he was elected criminal judge. The circuit was then composed of Williamson, Maury, Marshall and Giles counties. He held this office for six years. In 1878 he was elected circuit judge of the Ninth Judicial Circuit.

In addition, he acquired land and subdivided it for residential development. For example, in 1873 he bought 15 acres on the north side of Franklin and split it into lots.

== Personal life ==
On May 15, 1856, he wedded Anna S. Wharton, daughter of W. H. Wharton, a medical doctor of Nashville. McLemore and his wife Anna had five children: Annie L., Bethenia, Albert S., William W. and Lizzie M.

Before the Civil War, he was a Whig. Afterward he joined the Democratic Party. Most whites were members of the Democratic Party and regained political control of state legislatures and offices in the 1870s and 1880s.

He was a Mason and a member of the Methodist Episcopal Church South. His wife was a member of the Christian Church. He died in Murfreesboro on August 7, 1908, and was buried in Rest Haven Cemetery, Franklin.

== See also ==
- McLemore House

== Sources ==
- Allardice, Bruce S. (2008). Confederate Colonels: A Biographical Register. Columbia and London: University of Missouri Press. pp. 34, 268.
- Warwick, Richard, ed. (2001). "Records and Incidents of the Children of W.S. McLemore". Williamson County Historical Society Journal, no 32. pp. 55–94.

Attribution:

- Goodspeed, Westin Arthur, ed. (1886). History of Tennessee from the Earliest Time to the Present. Nashville, TN: The Goodspeed Publishing Co. pp. 996–997.
