= The Major and the Minor =

1942 film by Billy Wilder

- Theatrical release poster
- Directed by: Billy Wilder
- Written by: Billy Wilder; Charles Brackett
- Based on: Connie Goes Home (1923 play) by Edward Childs Carpenter; Sunny Goes Home (1921 story) by Fannie Kilbourne
- Produced by: Arthur Hornblow Jr.
- Starring: Ginger Rogers; Ray Milland
- Cinematography: Leo Tover
- Edited by: Doane Harrison
- Music by: Robert Emmett Dolan
- Distributed by: Paramount Pictures
- Release date: September 16, 1942
- Running time: 100 minutes
- Country: United States
- Language: English
- Box office: $2.5 million (rentals)

The Major and the Minor is a 1942 American romantic comedy film starring Ginger Rogers and Ray Milland. It was the first American film directed by Billy Wilder. The screenplay credited to Wilder and Charles Brackett is "suggested by" the 1923 play Connie Goes Home by Edward Childs Carpenter, based on the 1921 Saturday Evening Post story "Sunny Goes Home" by Fannie Kilbourne.

== Plot ==
After her first client, Albert Osborne, makes a heavy pass and refuses to take "No" for an answer, Susan Applegate quits her job as a Revigora System scalp massager and decides to leave New York City and return home to Stevenson, Iowa. At the train station, she discovers she has only enough money to cover a half fare, so she disguises herself as a twelve-year-old girl named Su-Su. When two suspicious conductors catch her smoking, Su-Su takes refuge in the compartment of Major Philip Kirby who, believing she is a frightened child, agrees to let her stay in his compartment until they reach his stop.

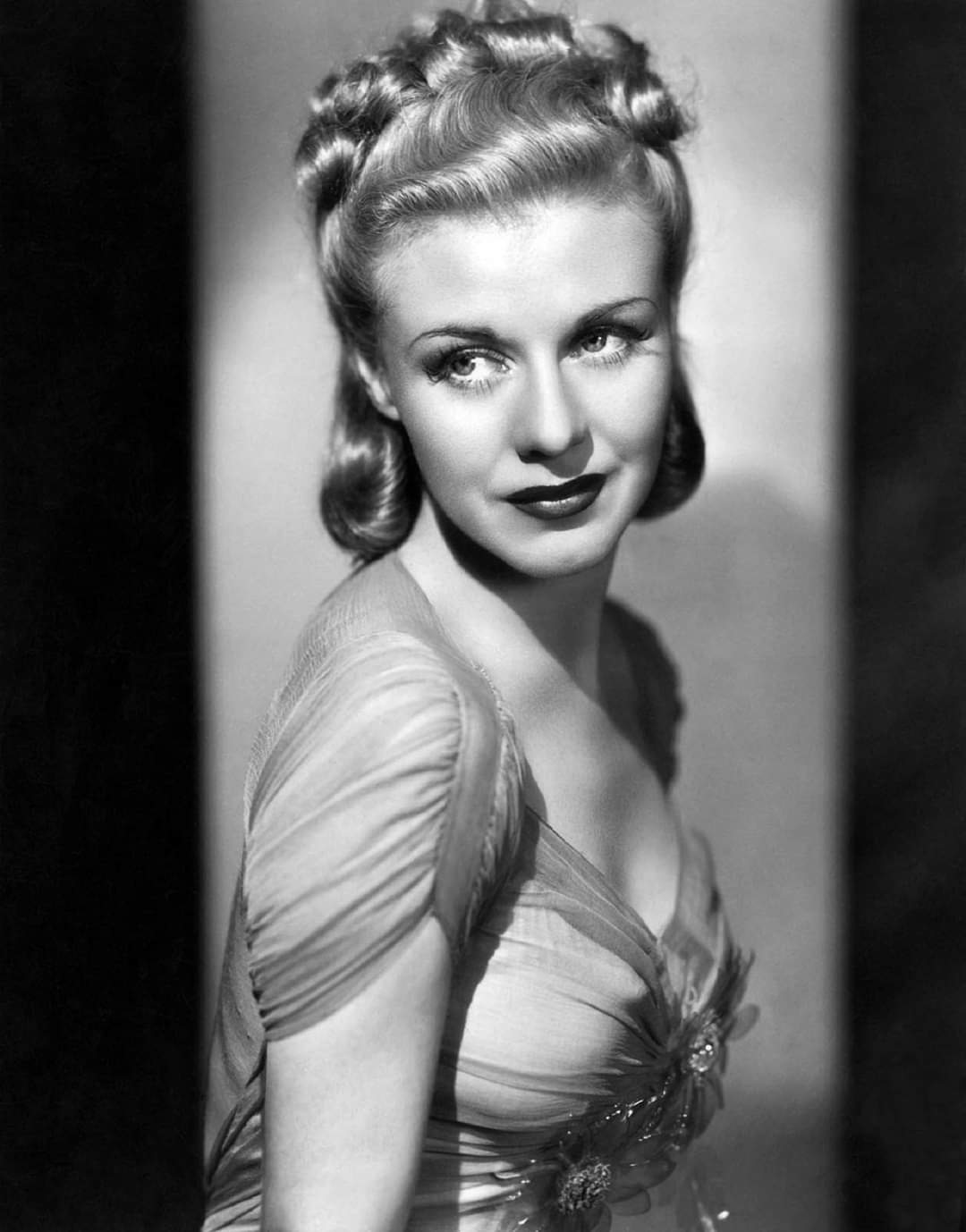
Ginger Rogers plays Susan Applegate, who passes as a 12-year-old when she cannot afford an adult fare.

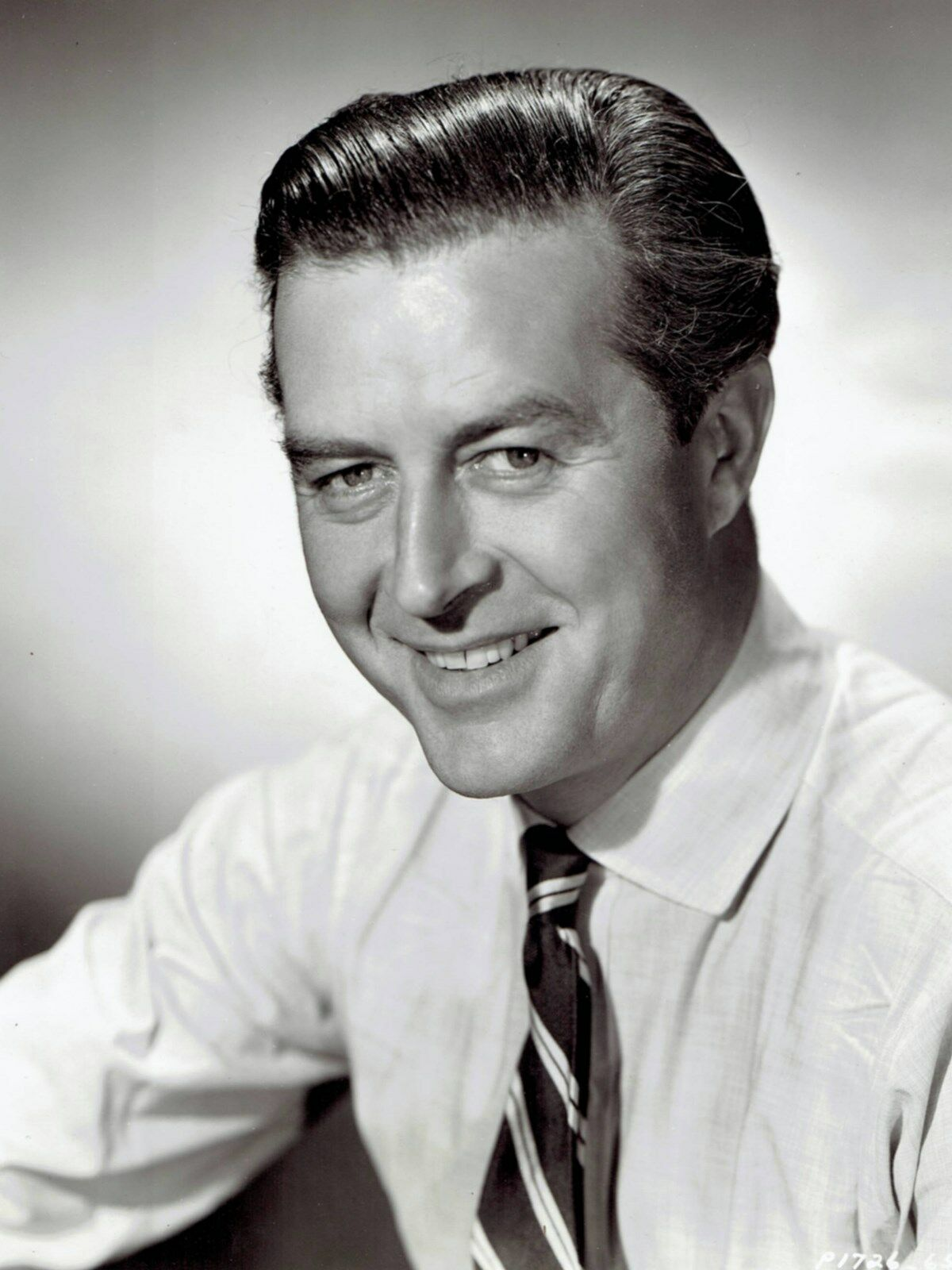
Ray Milland plays Major Philip Kirby, who protects "little Su-Su Applegate" from the wolfish teenage cadets during her unplanned detour at the military academy.

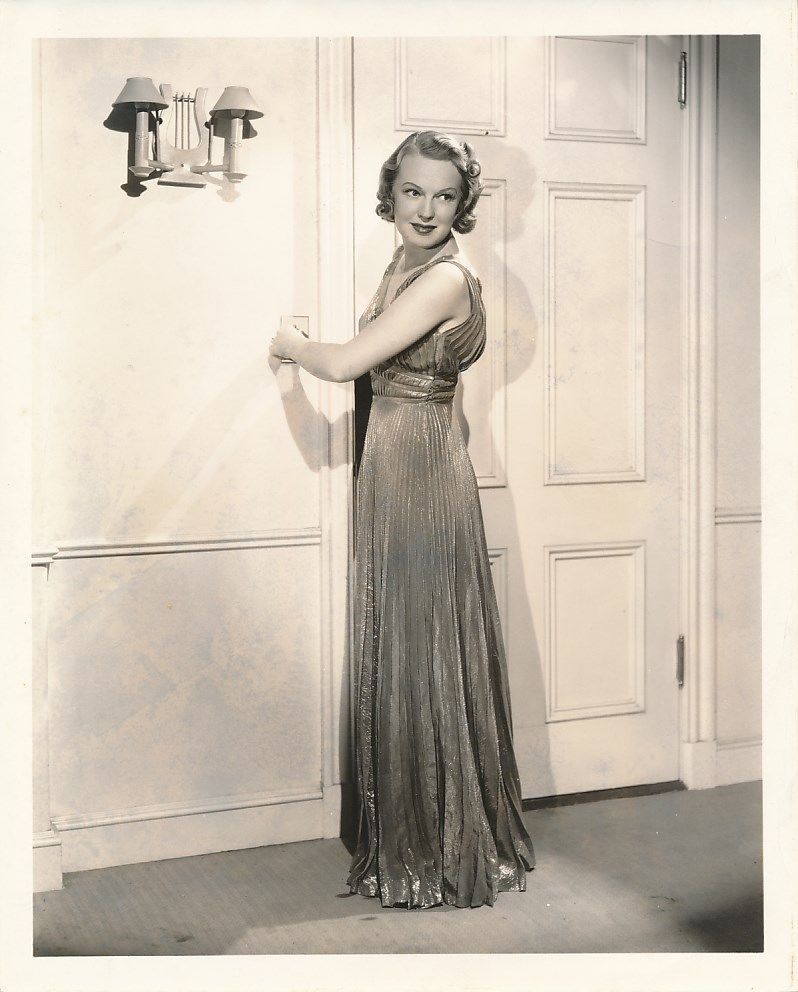
Rita Johnson plays Pamela Hill, Philip's fiancée who pulls strings against his wishes to keep him out of active duty.

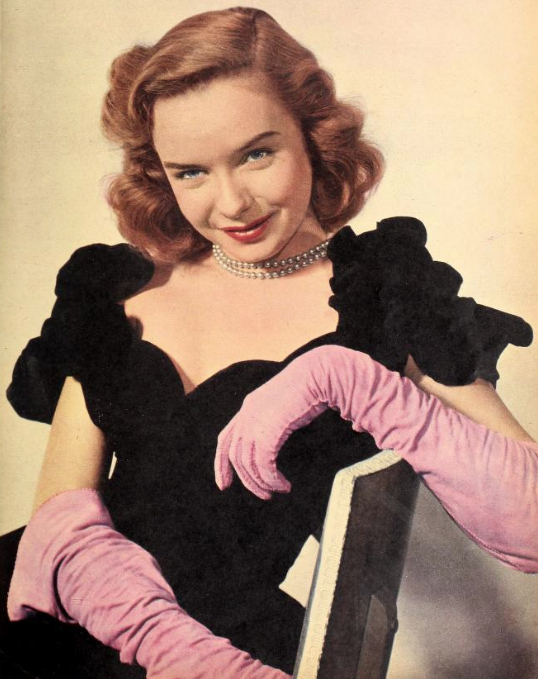
Diana Lynn plays Lucy Hill, Pamela's younger sister, who sees through Susan's masquerade and helps her pull off getting Philip active duty.

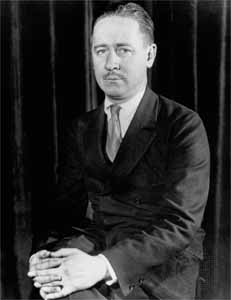
Robert Benchley as Albert Osborne, the flirtatious customer who drives Susan to head back home to Iowa, then recognizes her as "Su-Su" at his son's military academy

When the train is detained by flooding, Philip's fiancée, Pamela Hill and her father, his commanding officer at the military academy where he teaches, drive to meet him. Pamela boards the train and finds Su-Su sleeping in the lower berth. Imagining the worst, she accuses Philip of being unfaithful and reports his transgression to her father and the board. Amused, Philip introduces Su-Su to the assembled authorities. Pamela insists that she stay with them.

Pamela's teenaged sister Lucy, a student of biology, immediately sees through Susan's disguise. She promises to keep her secret if Susan will help her sabotage Pamela's efforts to keep Philip at the academy instead of allowing him to be assigned to active duty.

Susan becomes popular with the cadets, most of whom have refined a technique for stealing kisses using a description of the fall of the Maginot Line. Philip tries to explain to Susan why she should not encourage them, losing himself in a metaphor of lightbulbs and moths. At one point, he looks at her through his bad eye and tells her she will be a "knockout" one day.

When Lucy intercepts a letter from Pamela to one of her connections in Washington, D.C., asking that her husband be prevented from helping Philip get assigned to active duty, Susan uses her charm to persuade the phone cadet to leave her alone near the switchboard. Pretending to be Pamela, Susan calls one of Pamela's Washington, D.C., contacts and arranges to have Philip's status changed.

At the big school dance, Philip thanks Pamela: He reports for active duty in a week. She does not deny her role but refuses to marry him at such short notice. Cadet Clifford Osborne introduces Susan to his parents: His father is the client whose behavior prompted her to quit her job. It takes a while for Osborne senior to recall, but he eventually recognizes Susan and reveals her identity to Pamela.

Susan arranges to meet Philip after the dance. She rushes back to Lucy's room to change for an adult dress with high heels. Pamela tells Philip that Su-Su is sick, and Susan finds Pamela waiting instead. Pamela threatens to create a public scandal that will destroy Philip's career, unless Susan leaves immediately. Susan makes Lucy promise never to tell Philip about her.

Susan returns home, but continues to daydream about Philip, staring for hours at the moths fluttering around the porch light, much to the frustration of her fiancé, Will Duffy, and the mystification of her mother. When Philip phones from the train station, Susan identifies herself as Su-Su's mother; Su-Su is at a school play. He is on his way to San Diego to report for active duty; he has a frog from Lucy. At the house, he is astonished by Mrs. Applegate's resemblance to her daughter (Susan in disguise). He delivers best wishes from everyone at the school and tells her that Pamela married someone else. Pamela was right about one thing: A man heading into war has no right to marry. He tells her about an officer on his train who is traveling with his girl. They will stop in Nevada to be married, she will see him off, and he will be gone. Mrs Applegate tells him that he underestimates women.

At the station, the train draws near. Susan is standing at the far end of the platform. He approaches her, cautiously, starting to smile as the pieces fall into place. Her name? Susan Kathleen Applegate. She is going to marry a soldier—if he'll have her. She has a theory about the Fall of France... As she draws nearer, he looks at her with his bad eye. They kiss. "Su-Su!" he cries. "Come Philip!" she replies, and they run for the train.

== Cast ==
- Ginger Rogers as Susan Kathleen Applegate
- Ray Milland as Major Philip Kirby
- Rita Johnson as Pamela Hill
- Diana Lynn as Lucy Hill
- Edward Fielding as Colonel Oliver Slater Hill
- Robert Benchley as Albert Osborne
- Norma Varden as Mrs Osborne
- Frankie Thomas as Cadet Clifford Osborne
- Raymond Roe as Cadet Lt Anthony Wigton
- Charles Smith as Cadet Korner
- Larry Nunn as Cadet Babcock
- Billy Dawson as Cadet Miller
- Lela E. Rogers as Mrs Applegate, Susan's mother
- Richard Fiske as Will Duffy, Susan's fiancee
- Aldrich Bowker as Reverend Doyle
- Boyd Irwin as Major Griscom
- Byron Shores as Captain Durand
- Tom Dugan as con-man "dad" at train station

== Production ==
Wilder moved to Hollywood in 1934 shortly after directing his first film, the French language Mauvaise Graine. During the ensuing years, he and Charles Brackett had collaborated on eight screenplays, including Ninotchka and Ball of Fire, but Wilder was anxious to direct again and producer Arthur Hornblow Jr. agreed to give him a chance. Wilder was determined to make a mainstream film that would be a box-office success so he would not be relegated to a typewriter for the rest of his career. Paramount Pictures owned the screen rights to the play Connie Goes Home, which Wilder thought was the perfect vehicle for Ginger Rogers, and he and Brackett wrote the role of Philip Kirby with Cary Grant in mind. Their dialogue includes the oft-quoted line "Why don't you get out of that wet coat and into a dry martini?", which is a near-direct lift of the earlier "You ought to get out of those wet clothes and into a dry martini." from Every Day's a Holiday (1937), written by Mae West.

Rogers recently had won the Academy Award for Best Actress for Kitty Foyle, putting her in a position to select her own director. Agent Leland Hayward represented both Rogers and Wilder, who asked him to intercede with her on his behalf, and Brackett also urged her to meet the neophyte director. She agreed, and she and the screenwriters met during the filming of Roxie Hart. They pitched the film during lunch at an Italian restaurant, and Rogers later recalled Wilder "was charming, a European gentleman ... I've always been a good judge of character. I decided then and there that we would get along and that he had the qualities to become a good director ... I felt he would be strong, and that he would listen. He certainly understood how to pay attention to a woman." What also appealed to Rogers was the basic concept of the film. As a younger woman, she had pretended to be eligible for a child's fare when traveling by train with her cash-strapped mother on more than one occasion, so she easily identified with the plot and agreed to make the film. Wilder also agreed to her suggestion that he cast her own mother as her mother in the film.

Wilder was driving home from the studio one evening and pulled up at a red light next to Ray Milland. Impulsively, he called out, "I'm doing a picture. Would you like to be in it?," and the actor responded, "Sure." Wilder sent him the script, which Milland liked. Three years later the two men would collaborate on The Lost Weekend, which would win Oscars for both of them.

As a neophyte director, Wilder heavily relied on editor Doane Harrison for guidance. Harrison had edited Hold Back the Dawn (1941), which Brackett and Wilder had written. Unusually for an editor, Harrison was on the set for filming as well as working in the cutting room. Wilder later said, "I worked with a very good cutter, Doane Harrison, from whom I learned a great deal. He was much more of a help to me than the cameraman. When I became a director from a writer, my technical knowledge was very meagre." Harrison taught him how to "cut in the camera", a form of spontaneous editing that results in a minimal amount of film being shot and eliminates the possibility of studio heads later adding footage the director deemed unnecessary. In later years, Wilder commented, "When I finish a film, there is nothing on the cutting room floor but chewing gum wrappers and tears." Wilder's and Harrison's unusually close and important collaboration continued for every subsequent film directed by Wilder through The Fortune Cookie (1966), which earned Walter Matthau an Academy Award for Best Actor.

Leo Tover was the cinematographer for the film; Tover had also worked on Hold Back the Dawn. The campus of St. John's Military Academy in Delafield, Wisconsin, was used for exterior location shots. Principal photography was completed quickly and efficiently. Rogers later recalled, "We had a lot of fun making the picture. It was that kind of story. And even though it was his first film, from day one, I saw that Billy knew what to do. He was very sure of himself. He had perfect confidence ... I've never been sorry I made the film. The Major and the Minor really holds up. It's as good now as it was then."

The film was remade as You're Never Too Young in 1955. The gender-reversal version starred Jerry Lewis as the adult disguised as a child and Diana Lynn, who portrayed teenager Lucy Hill in the original.

== Soundtrack ==
The film's soundtrack includes "Blues in the Night" by Harold Arlen and Johnny Mercer; "Sweet Sue Just You" by Victor Young and Will J. Harris; "Dream Lover" by Victor Schertzinger and Clifford Grey; "Isn't It Romantic" and "Lover" by Richard Rodgers and Lorenz Hart.

== Critical reception ==
Contemporary reviews were enthusiastic. Bosley Crowther of The New York Times said the Wilder-Brackett script "effervesces with neat situations and bright lines" and added, "The gentlemen have written – and Mr. Wilder has directed – a bountiful comedy-romance. And Miss Rogers and Mr. Milland have played it with spirit and taste. Never once does either permit the suggestion of a leer to creep in ... Miss Rogers gives a beautiful imitation of a Quiz Kid imitating Baby Snooks. And in those moments when romance brightly kindles, she is a soft and altogether winning miss. Put this down as one of the best characterizations of her career. Credit Mr. Milland, too, with making a warm and nimble fellow of the major, and all the rest of the cast for doing very well with lively roles."

Variety called the film a "sparkling and effervescing piece of farce-comedy" with a story that is "light, fluffy, and frolicsome ... Both script and direction swing the yarn along at a consistent pace, with the laughs developing naturally and without strain."

The film has a 100% rating on film review aggregator website Rotten Tomatoes, based on 19 reviews, with an average rating of 7.3/10.
