= The Little Patriot =

1917 film by William Bertram

- Directed by: William Bertram
- Written by: John Grey; Lela E. Rogers
- Starring: Marie Osborne; Herbert Standing; Marion Warner
- Cinematography: William Nobles
- Production company: Diando Film Corporation
- Distributed by: Pathé Exchange
- Release date: December 2, 1917
- Running time: 50 minutes
- Country: United States
- Languages: Silent; English intertitles

The Little Patriot is a 1917 American silent drama film directed by William Bertram and starring Marie Osborne, Herbert Standing and Marion Warner.

== Cast ==
- Marie Osborne as The Little Patriot
- Herbert Standing as Her Grandfather
- Marion Warner as Her Mother
- Jack Connolly as Undetermined Role
- Frank Lanning as Undetermined Role
- Madge Evans as Undetermined Role

== Bibliography ==
- Robin Blaetz. Visions of the Maid: Joan of Arc in American Film and Culture. University of Virginia Press, 2001.
