= James Wellborn Starnes =

Confederate States Army officer (1817–1863)

- Born: July 19, 1817; Wilkes County, North Carolina, U.S.
- Died: June 30, 1863 (aged 45); Near Spring Hill, Tennessee, C.S.
- Military career
- Allegiance: Confederate States
- Branch: Confederate States Army
- Service years: 1861–1863
- Rank: Colonel
- Commands: 4th Tennessee Cavalry Regiment
- Battles: American Civil War; Middle Tennessee Campaign (DOW)

James Wellborn (Note: Also given as Wilborn.) Starnes (July 19, 1817 – June 30, 1863) was an American medical doctor and planter who served as a senior officer of the Confederate States Army, commanding the 4th Tennessee Cavalry Regiment in the Western Theater of the American Civil War.

== Biography ==
Wellborn was commissioned a colonel in the Confederate States Army and commanded a brigade under Bedford Forest. In one genealogical source, he is referred to as a general.

== Bibliography ==
- Allardice, Bruce S. (2008). Confederate Colonels: A Biographical Register. Columbia and London: University of Missouri Press. p. 355.
- Van Wagenen, Avis Stearns (1983). Genealogy and Memoirs of Charles and Nathaniel Stearns, and Their Descendants. United States of America: Courier Printing Company. p. 131.
