= McLemore House =

Historic house in Tennessee, United States

- U.S. National Register of Historic Places
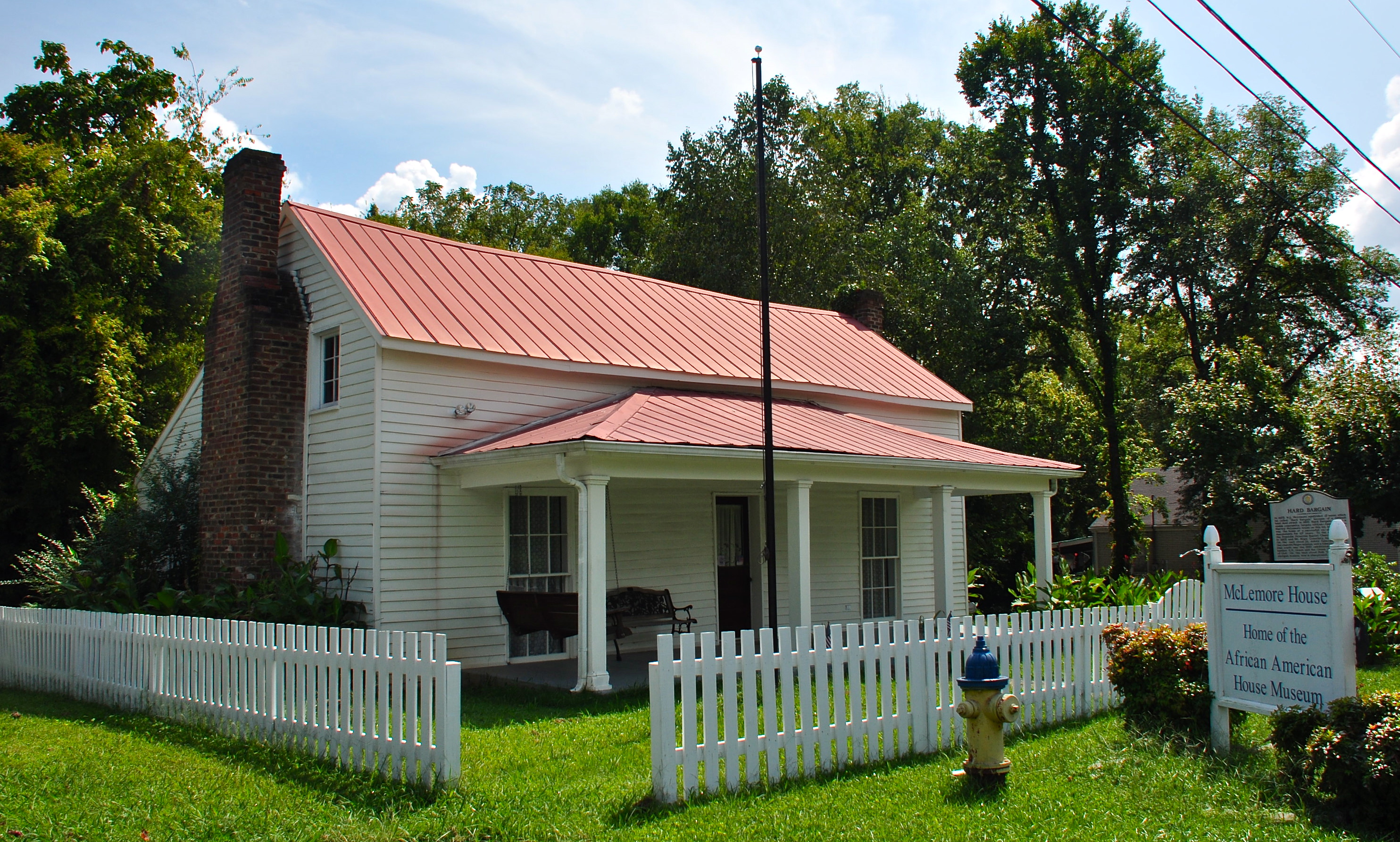
- McLemore House, September 2014.

- Location within Tennessee Location within the United States
- Location: 447 11th Ave. N., Franklin, Tennessee
- Coordinates: 35°55′31″N 86°52′47″W
- Area: 0.8 acres (0.32 ha)
- Built: 1880 and 1910
- Architectural style: Colonial Revival
- NRHP reference No.: 99001372
- Added to NRHP: November 18, 1999

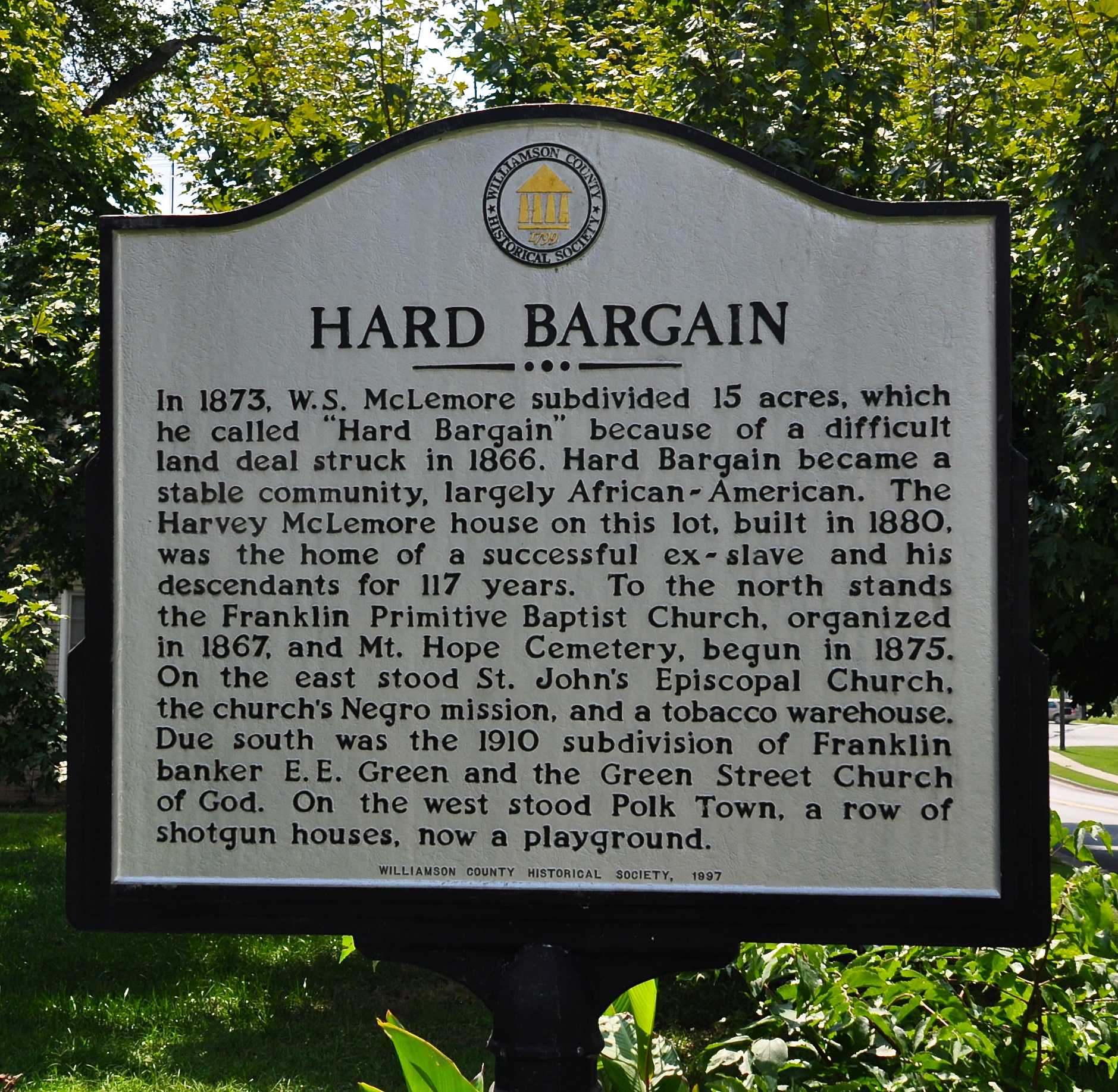
Williamson County Historical Society Marker for the Hard Bargain (McLemore House.)

The McLemore House is a property in Franklin, Tennessee that was listed on the National Register of Historic Places in 1999. It has been part of an African-American neighborhood since the 1880s.

It is also known as the Harvey McLemore House. McLemore, born into slavery, became successful after gaining freedom after the war and purchased land and had the house built on it. The freedman had become a successful farmer. This has also been known as the House and Estate of Maggie Matthews. (She was a daughter of Harvey McLemore and his wife, who inherited and lived in the house after her parents.)

The house was built in Hard Bargain, a 15-acre area owned by attorney William S. McLemore, who subdivided it after 1873 for residences. Most of the early residents of this area were African-American freedmen and their families, and they created a community that has survived.

== History ==
The house dates from 1880 and it includes elements of Colonial Revival architecture. Harvey McLemore (b. c.1835-1903) and his descendants owned the house from 1880 to 1997, for five (or seven) generations.

In 1859 Harvey McLemore was sold as "a slave for life" to attorney William S. McLemore of Franklin, who was serving as the county clerk. He later was elected as a judge. Harvey had previously been held by William's mother, Bethenia J. McLemore.

Several years later, after the Civil War and passage of constitutional amendments abolishing slavery and establishing the right to vote, Harvey McLemore became a freedman and gained the franchise.

After becoming a criminal judge, William S. McLemore bought 15 acres of land in 1873, with plans to subdivide it for residences. One account is that he named it Hard Bargain because of the negotiating he had to go through to make the deal.

In 1880, Harvey McLemore purchased four lots from Judge McLemore. He built his house as one of the first in the subdivision. Harvey McLemore was the third African American to purchase property in Hard Bargain. He and other freedmen formed a new African-American community that has survived into the 21st century.

== Today ==
The house was purchased in 1997 by Habitat for Humanity and the Heritage Foundation of Franklin and Williamson County. In 1998 the house was under renovation for use as a museum. This process revealed much of the architectural history of the house.

It is now operated as a museum, known as the McLemore House African-American Museum or the McLemore House Museum.
