= 4th Tennessee Cavalry Regiment (Confederate) =

- Active: May 1862 to May 9, 1865
- Allegiance: Confederate States of America
- Branch: Confederate States Army
- Type: Cavalry
- Engagements: American Civil War; Battle of Parker's Cross Roads; Battle of Franklin; Battle of Chickamauga; Atlanta campaign

Commanders
- Notable commanders: Col. James W. Starnes †; Col. William S. McLemore; Lt. Col. Peril C. Haynes; Maj. Peter T. Rankin

The 4th Tennessee Cavalry Regiment was a cavalry regiment that served in the Confederate States Army during the American Civil War.

== Overview ==
The unit was originally organized as the 3rd Regiment at Camp Robertson, Bledsoe County, Tennessee, in May 1862. Four companies were supplemented to James W. Starnes' 8th Cavalry Battalion to form the new regiment.

The men were from the counties of Wilson, Marshall, Bedford, Rutherford, Smith, Marion, Coffee, and Franklin.

The regiment was reunited in South Carolina during January 1865, It participated in the campaign of the Carolinas. It was included in the surrender on May 9.

The 4th Tennessee Cavalry saw action at the battles of Parker's Cross Roads, Franklin, Chickamauga, and in the Atlanta Campaign. It was later separated into two regiments serving in different departments of the army, one under General Forrest and the other under General Wheeler. The two regiments were reunited in January 1865 and served in the Carolinas until surrendering on May 9, 1865. .

== Commanders ==
In one of the cavalry battles around Tullahoma, Colonel James W. Starnes was killed in action. Colonel William S. McLemore, of Franklin, succeeded to his command.

== See also ==
- List of Tennessee Confederate Civil War units
