= Ginger Rogers =

American actress, singer, and dancer (1911–1995)

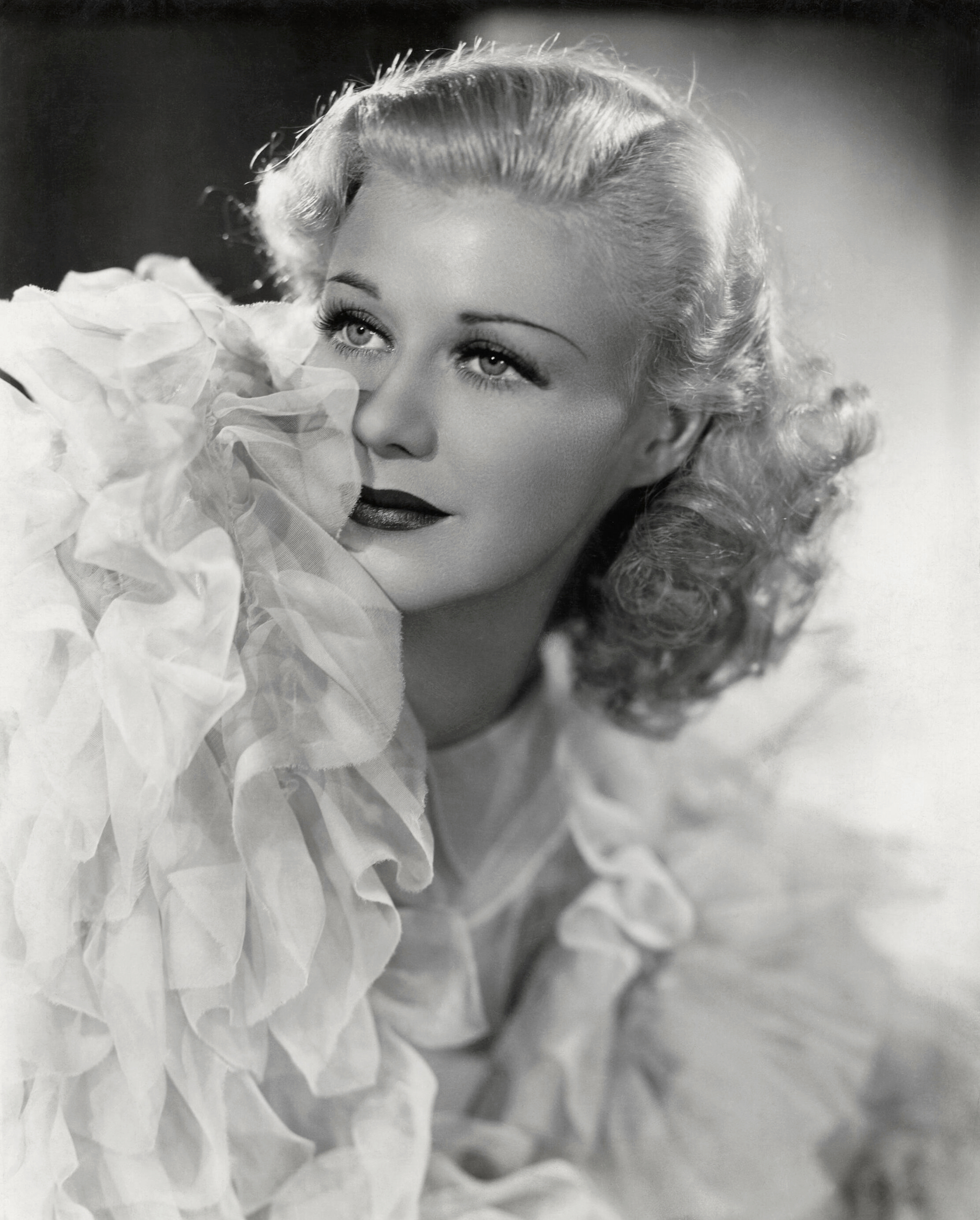
- Rogers in 1937
- Born: Virginia Katherine McMath; July 16, 1911; Independence, Missouri, U.S.
- Died: April 25, 1995 (aged 83); Rancho Mirage, California, U.S.
- Occupations: Actress; dancer; singer
- Years active: 1925–1987
- Known for: Kitty Foyle; Top Hat; Vivacious Lady; The Gay Divorcee; Swing Time; 42nd Street
- Political party: Republican
- Spouses: Jack Pepper (m. 1929; div. 1931); Lew Ayres (m. 1934; div. 1940); Jack Briggs (m. 1943; div. 1949); Jacques Bergerac (m. 1953; div. 1957); William Marshall (m. 1961; div. 1969)
- Relatives: Lela E. Rogers (mother); Phyllis Fraser (cousin); Vinton Hayworth (uncle)
- Awards: Academy Award for Best Actress; Hollywood Walk of Fame
- Website: gingerrogers.com

Ginger Rogers (born Virginia Katherine McMath; July 16, 1911 – April 25, 1995) was an American actress, dancer, and singer during the Golden Age of Hollywood. She won an Academy Award for Best Actress for her starring role in Kitty Foyle (1940), and performed during the 1930s in RKO's musical films with Fred Astaire. Her career continued on stage, radio, and television throughout much of the 20th century.

Rogers was born in Independence, Missouri, and raised in Kansas City. She and her family moved to Fort Worth, Texas, when she was nine years old. In 1925, she won a Charleston dance contest that helped her launch a successful vaudeville career. After that, she gained recognition as a Broadway actress for her stage debut in Girl Crazy. This led to a contract with Paramount Pictures, which ended after five films. Rogers had her first successful film roles as a supporting actress in 42nd Street (1933) and Gold Diggers of 1933 (1933).

In the 1930s, Rogers's nine films with Fred Astaire are credited with revolutionizing the musical genre and gave RKO Pictures some of its biggest successes: The Gay Divorcee (1934), Top Hat (1935) and Swing Time (1936). But after two commercial failures with Astaire, she turned her focus to dramatic and comedy films. Her acting was well received by critics and audiences in films such as Stage Door (1937), Vivacious Lady (1938), Bachelor Mother (1939), Primrose Path (1940), Kitty Foyle (1940), The Major and the Minor (1942) and I'll Be Seeing You (1944). After winning the Oscar, Rogers became one of the biggest box-office draws and highest-paid actresses of the 1940s.

Rogers's popularity was peaking by the end of the decade. She reunited with Astaire in 1949 in the commercially successful The Barkleys of Broadway. She starred in the successful comedy Monkey Business (1952) and was critically lauded for her performance in Tight Spot (1955) before entering an unsuccessful period of filmmaking in the mid-1950s, and returned to Broadway in 1965, playing the lead role in Hello, Dolly! More Broadway roles followed, along with her stage directorial debut in 1985 of an off-Broadway production of Babes in Arms. She continued to act, making television appearances until 1987, and wrote an autobiography Ginger: My Story which was published in 1991. In 1992, Rogers was recognized at the Kennedy Center Honors. She died of natural causes in 1995, at age 83.

During her long career, Rogers made 73 films. In 1999, she ranks number 14 on the AFI's 100 Years...100 Stars list of female stars of classic American cinema.

== Early life ==
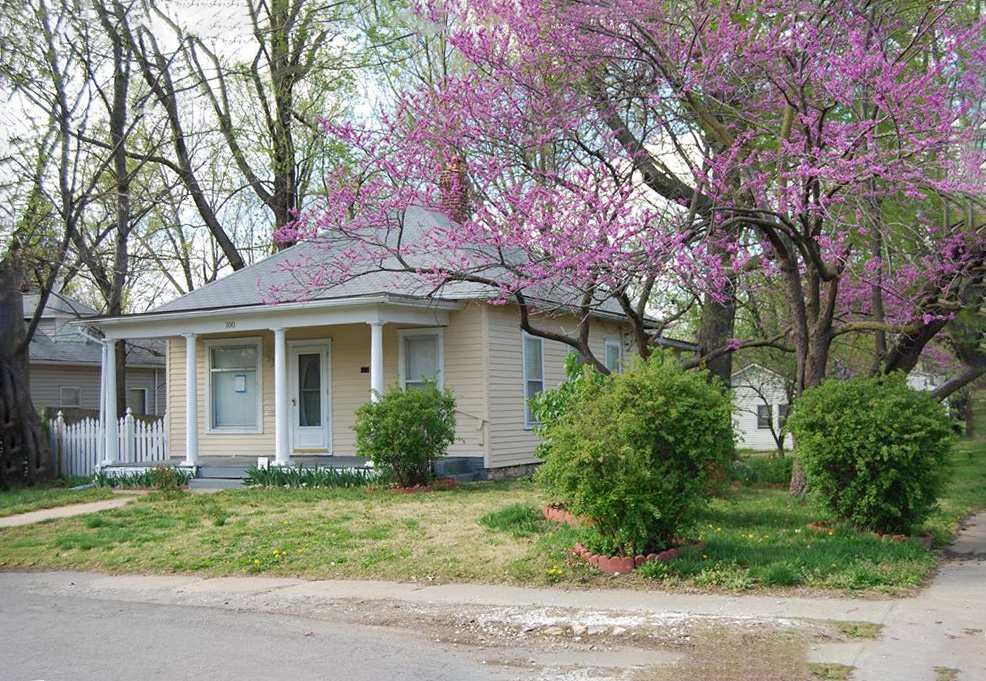
100 W Moore St., Independence, Missouri, Rogers's birthplace

Rogers was born Virginia Katherine McMath on July 16, 1911 in Independence, Missouri, the only child of Lela Emogene Owens, a newspaper reporter, and William Eddins McMath, an electrical engineer. Her maternal grandparents were Wilma Saphrona (née Ball) and Walter Winfield Owens. She was of Scottish, Welsh, and English ancestry. Her mother gave birth to Ginger at home, having lost a previous child in a hospital. Rogers was raised a Christian Scientist and remained a lifelong adherent.

Her parents separated shortly after she was born. After unsuccessfully trying to reunite with his family, McMath kidnapped his daughter twice, and her mother divorced him soon thereafter. Rogers never saw him again. In 1915, she was left with her grandparents, who lived in nearby Kansas City, while her mother made a trip to Hollywood in an effort to get an essay she had written made into a film. Lela succeeded and continued to write scripts for Fox Studios.

One of Rogers's young cousins had a hard time pronouncing "Virginia", giving her the nickname "Ginger".

When Rogers was nine years old, her mother married John Logan Rogers, whose surname she took. The family moved to Fort Worth, Texas, where her mother became a theater critic for a local newspaper. Rogers attended, but did not graduate from, Fort Worth's Central High School.

As a teenager, Rogers thought of becoming a school teacher, but with her mother's interest in Hollywood and the theater, her early exposure to the theater increased. Waiting for her mother in the wings of Ft. Worth's Majestic Theatre, she began to sing and dance along with the performers on stage.

== Career ==
=== 1925–1929: Vaudeville and Broadway ===
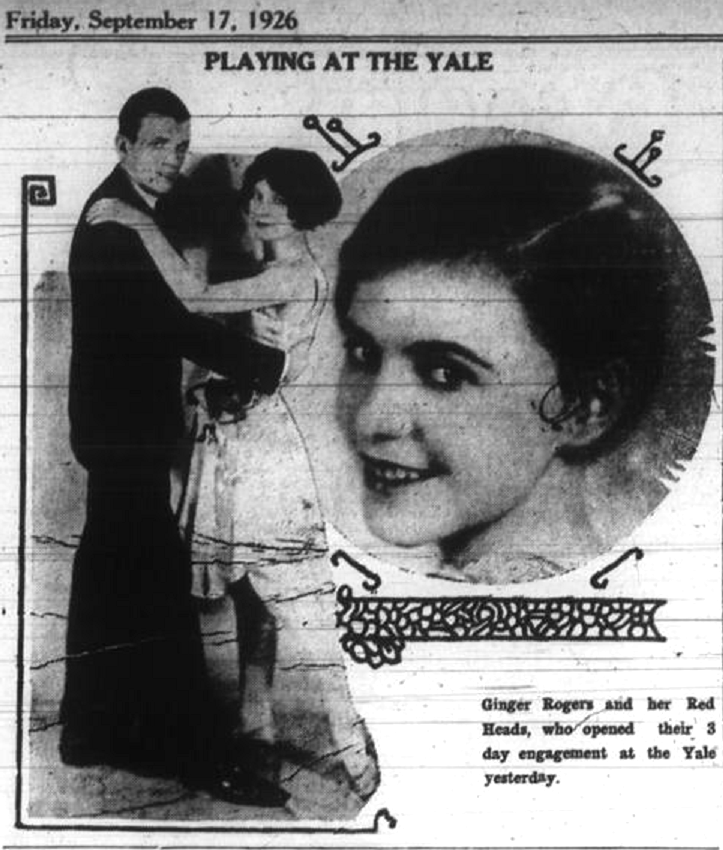
Advertisement for Ginger Rogers and the Redheads in 1926

Rogers's entertainment career began when the traveling vaudeville act of Eddie Foy came to Fort Worth and needed a quick stand-in. In 1925 the 14-year-old entered and won a Charleston dance contest; the prize allowed her to tour as Ginger Rogers and the Redheads for six months on the Orpheum Circuit. In 1926, the group performed at an 18-month-old theater called The Craterian in Medford, Oregon. This theater honored her years later by changing its name to the Craterian Ginger Rogers Theater. When the M.G.M film The Barrier premiered in San Bernardino, California, in February 1926, Rogers's vaudeville act was featured. The local newspaper commented, "Clever little Ginger Rogers showed why she won the Texas state championship as a Charleston dancer."

At 17, Rogers married Jack Culpepper, a singer/dancer/comedian/recording artist of the day who worked under the name Jack Pepper (according to Ginger's autobiography and Life magazine, she knew Culpepper when she was a child, as her cousin's boyfriend). They formed a short-lived vaudeville double act known as "Ginger and Pepper". The marriage was over within a year, and she went back to touring with her mother. When the tour got to New York City, she stayed, getting radio singing jobs. She made her Broadway debut in the musical Top Speed, which opened at Chanin's 46th Street Theatre on Christmas Day, 1929 following the musical's premiere in Philadelphia at the Chestnut Street Opera House on November 13, 1929.

Within two weeks of the New York opening of Top Speed, Rogers was chosen to star on Broadway in Girl Crazy by George Gershwin and Ira Gershwin. Fred Astaire was hired to help the dancers with their choreography. Her appearance in Girl Crazy made her an overnight star at the age of 19.

=== 1929–1933: Early film roles ===
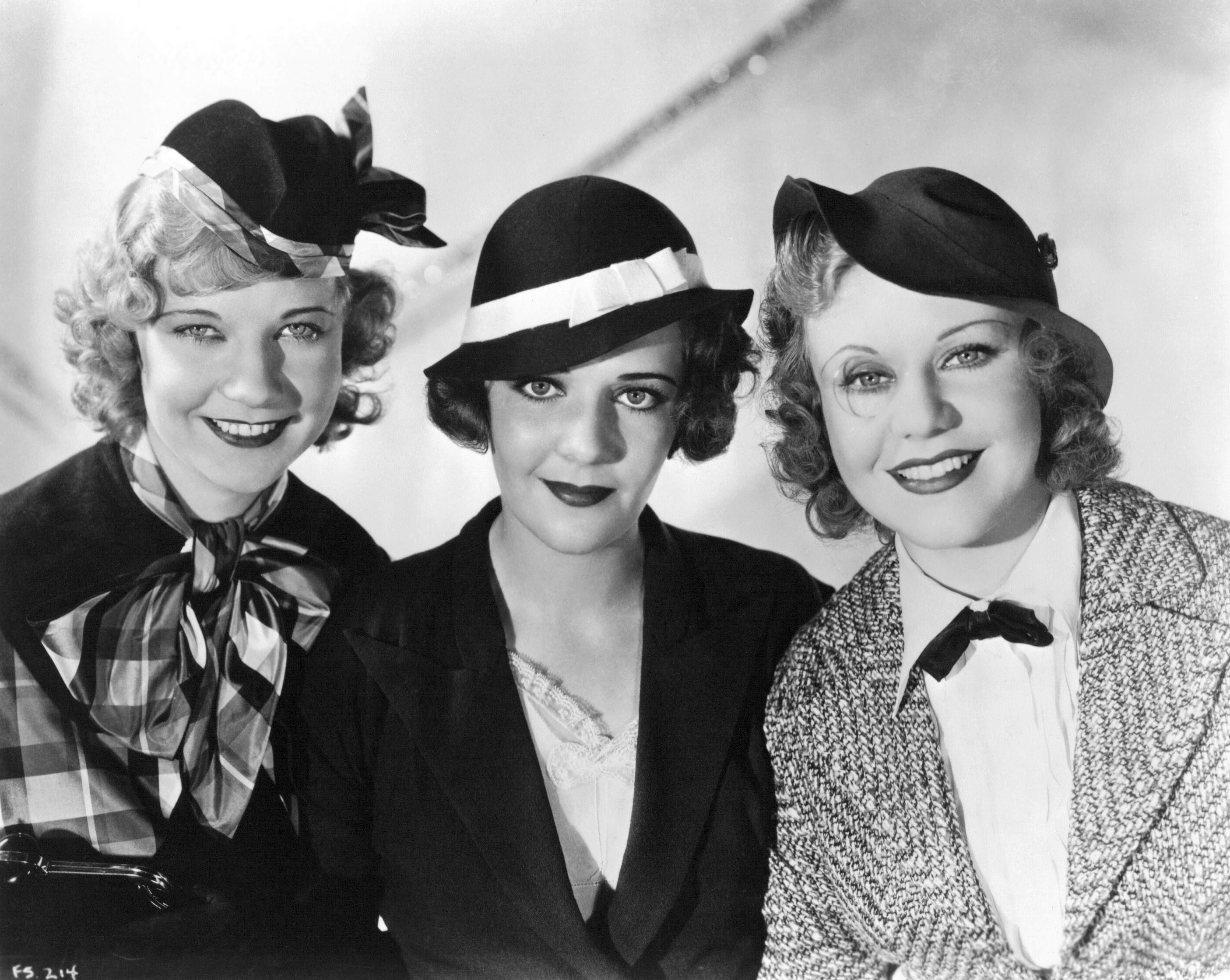
Una Merkel, Ruby Keeler, and Rogers in 42nd Street (1933)

Rogers's first movie roles were in a trio of short films made in 1929: Night in the Dormitory, A Day of a Man of Affairs, and Campus Sweethearts. In 1930, Paramount Pictures signed her to a seven-year contract.

Rogers soon got herself out of the Paramount contract—under which she had made five feature films at Astoria Studios in Astoria, Queens—and moved with her mother to Hollywood. When she got to California, she signed a three-picture deal with Pathé Exchange. Two of her pictures at Pathé were Suicide Fleet (1931) and Carnival Boat (1932) in which she played opposite future Hopalong Cassidy star William Boyd. Rogers also made feature films for Warner Bros., Monogram, and Fox in 1932, and was named one of 15 WAMPAS Baby Stars. She then made a significant breakthrough as Anytime Annie in the Warner Bros. film 42nd Street (1933). She went on to make a series of films at Warner Bros., most notably in Gold Diggers of 1933, in which her solo, "We're in the Money", included a memorable verse in Pig Latin. She then moved to RKO Studios, was put under contract and with Astaire started work on Flying Down to Rio, a picture starring Dolores del Río and Gene Raymond. Rogers and Astaire "stole the show", an industry term for outshining the billed stars.

=== 1933–1939: Partnership with Astaire ===
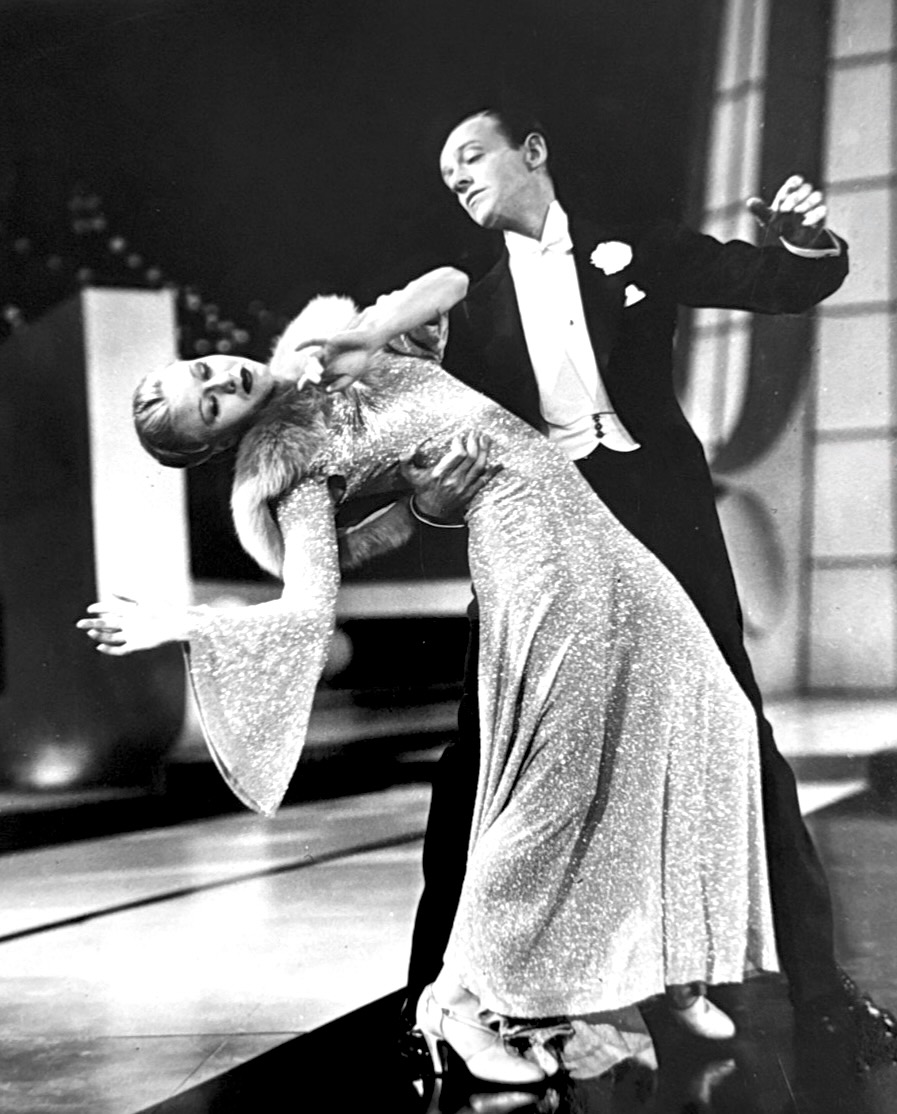
Rogers with her frequent co-star Fred Astaire in Follow the Fleet (1936)

Rogers was known for her partnership with Fred Astaire. Together, from 1933 to 1939, they made nine musical films at RKO: Flying Down to Rio (1933), The Gay Divorcee (1934), Roberta (1935), Top Hat (1935), Follow the Fleet (1936), Swing Time (1936), Shall We Dance (1937), Carefree (1938), and The Story of Vernon and Irene Castle (1939). The Barkleys of Broadway (1949) was produced later at MGM. They revolutionized the Hollywood musical by introducing dance routines of unprecedented elegance and virtuosity with sweeping long shots set to songs specially composed for them by the greatest popular song composers of the day. One such composer was Cole Porter with "Night and Day", a song Astaire sang to Rogers with the line "... you are the one" in two of their movies, being particularly poignant in their last pairing of The Barkleys of Broadway.

Arlene Croce, Hermes Pan, Hannah Hyam, and John Mueller all consider Rogers to have been Astaire's finest dance partner, because of her ability to combine dancing skills, beauty, and ability as a dramatic actress and comedian. The pair's song and dance partnership proved popular with audiences.

Of the 33 partnered dances Rogers performed with Astaire, Croce and Mueller have highlighted the infectious spontaneity of her performances in the comic numbers "I'll Be Hard to Handle" from Roberta, "I'm Putting All My Eggs in One Basket" from Follow the Fleet, and "Pick Yourself Up" from Swing Time. They also point to the use Astaire made of her remarkably flexible back in classic romantic dances such as "Smoke Gets in Your Eyes" from Roberta, "Cheek to Cheek" from Top Hat, and "Let's Face the Music and Dance" from Follow the Fleet.

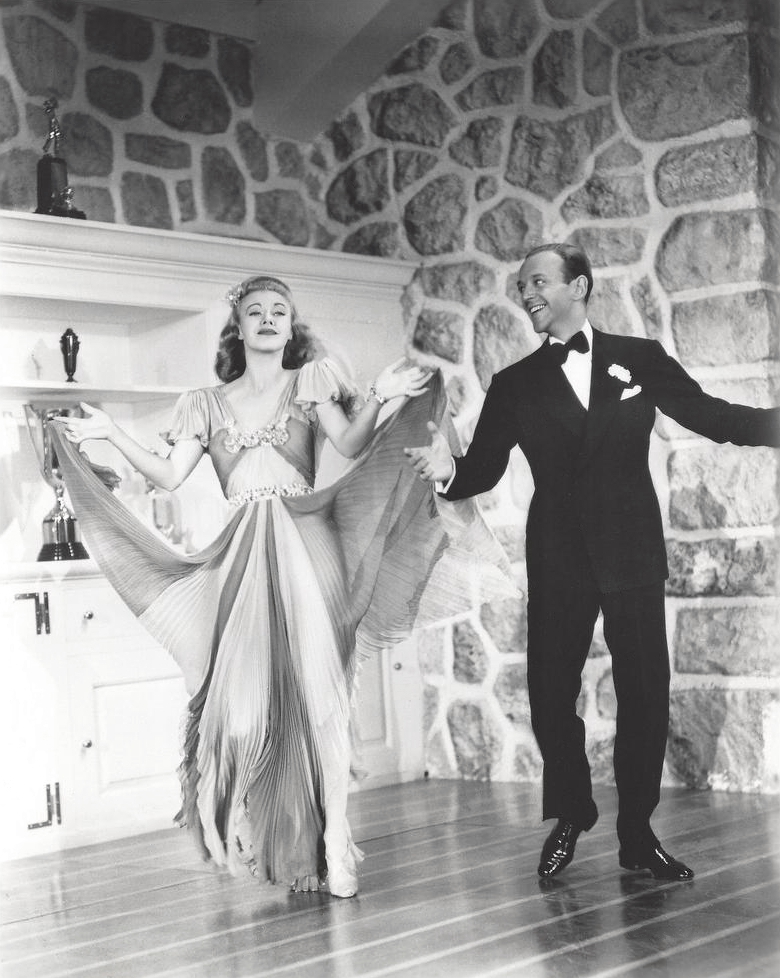
Rogers and Astaire in Carefree (1938)

Although the dance routines were choreographed by Astaire and his collaborator Hermes Pan, both have testified to her consummate professionalism, even during periods of intense strain, as she tried to juggle her many other contractual film commitments with the punishing rehearsal schedules of Astaire, who made at most two films in any one year. In 1986, shortly before his death, Astaire remarked, "All the girls I ever danced with thought they couldn't do it, but of course they could. So they always cried. All except Ginger. No, no, Ginger never cried".

John Mueller summed up Rogers's abilities as: "Rogers was outstanding among Astaire's partners, not because she was superior to others as a dancer, but, because, as a skilled, intuitive actress, she was cagey enough to realize that acting did not stop when dancing began ... the reason so many women have fantasized about dancing with Fred Astaire is that Ginger Rogers conveyed the impression that dancing with him is the most thrilling experience imaginable".

According to Raymond Rohauer, curator at the New York Gallery of Modern Art, Astaire gave Rogers this salute: "Ginger was brilliantly effective. She made everything work for her. Actually she made things very fine for both of us and she deserves most of the credit for our success."

In a 1976 episode of the popular British talk-show Parkinson (Season 5, Episode 24), host Michael Parkinson asked Astaire who his favorite dancing partner was. Astaire answered, "Excuse me, I must say Ginger was certainly the one. You know, the most effective partner I ever had. Everyone knows."

After 15 months apart and with RKO facing bankruptcy, the studio paired Fred and Ginger for another movie titled Carefree, but it lost money. Next came The Story of Vernon and Irene Castle, based on a true story, but the serious plot and tragic ending resulted in the worst box-office receipts of any of their films. This was driven not by diminished popularity, but by the hard 1930s economic reality. The production costs of musicals, always significantly greater than regular features, continued to increase at a much faster rate than admissions.

==== Success in non-musicals ====
Both before and immediately after her dancing and acting partnership with Fred Astaire ended, Rogers starred in a number of successful nonmusical films. Stage Door (1937) demonstrated her dramatic capacity, as the loquacious yet vulnerable girl next door and tough-minded theatrical hopeful, opposite Katharine Hepburn. Successful comedies included Vivacious Lady (1938) with James Stewart, Fifth Avenue Girl (1939), where she played an out-of-work girl sucked into the lives of a wealthy family, and Bachelor Mother (1939), with David Niven, in which she played a shop girl who is falsely thought to have abandoned her baby.

In 1934, Rogers sued Sylvia of Hollywood for $100K for defamation. The fitness guru and radio personality had claimed that Rogers was on her radio show when, in fact, she was not.

On March 5, 1939, Rogers starred in "Single Party Going East", an episode of Silver Theater on CBS radio.

=== 1940–1949: Career peak and reuniting with Astaire ===
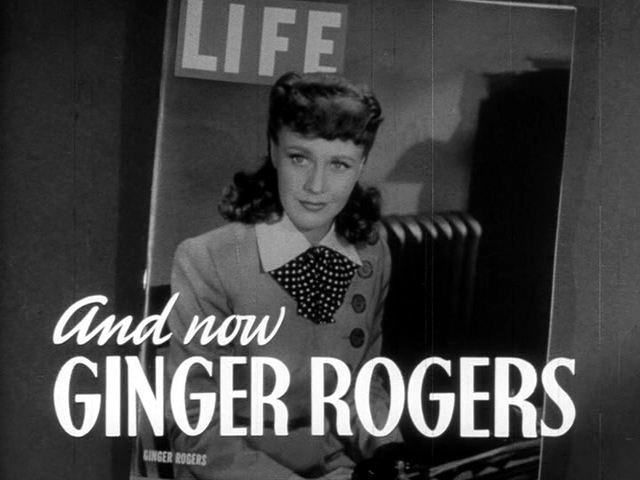
A trailer for Kitty Foyle depicting Rogers' cover appearance on Life magazine for her Oscar-winning 1940 role

In 1941 Rogers won the Academy Award for Best Actress for her role in 1940's Kitty Foyle. She enjoyed considerable success during the early 1940s, and was RKO's hottest property during this period. In Roxie Hart (1942), based on the same play which later served as the template for the musical Chicago, Rogers played a wisecracking flapper in a love triangle on trial for the murder of her lover; set in the era of prohibition. Most of the film takes place in a women's jail.

In the melodrama Primrose Path (1940), directed by Gregory La Cava, she plays a character attempting to conceal being a prostitute's daughter being pressured into following the fate of her mother and grandmother. Further highlights of this period included Tom, Dick, and Harry, a 1941 comedy in which she dreams of marrying three different men; I'll Be Seeing You (1944), with Joseph Cotten; and Billy Wilder's first Hollywood feature film: The Major and the Minor (1942), in which she played a down-on-her-luck woman who masquerades as a 12-year-old to get a cheap train ticket home and finds herself obliged to continue the ruse at a military academy. Rogers' mother, Lela, played her mother in the film.

After becoming a free agent, Rogers made hugely successful films with other studios in the mid-'40s, including Tender Comrade (1943), Lady in the Dark (1944), and Week-End at the Waldorf (1945), and became the highest-paid performer in Hollywood. However, by the end of the decade, her film career had peaked. Arthur Freed reunited her with Fred Astaire in The Barkleys of Broadway in 1949, when Judy Garland was unable to appear in the role that was to have reunited her with her Easter Parade co-star.

=== 1950–1987: Later career ===
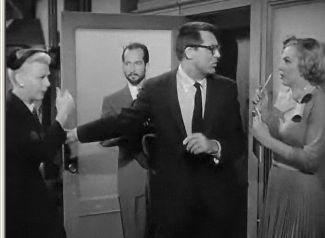
Rogers in Monkey Business (1952) with Robert Cornthwaite, Cary Grant, and Marilyn Monroe

Rogers's film career entered a period of gradual decline in the 1950s, as parts for older actresses became more difficult to obtain, but she still scored with some solid movies. She starred in Storm Warning (1950) with Ronald Reagan and Doris Day, a noir, anti-Ku Klux Klan film by Warner Bros. In 1952 Rogers starred in two comedies featuring Marilyn Monroe, Monkey Business with Cary Grant, directed by Howard Hawks, and We're Not Married!. She followed those with a role in Dreamboat alongside Clifton Webb, as his former onscreen partner in silent films who wanted to renew their association on television. She played the female lead in Tight Spot (1955), a mystery thriller, with Edward G. Robinson. After a series of unremarkable films, she scored a great popular success on Broadway in 1965, playing Dolly Levi in the long-running Hello, Dolly!

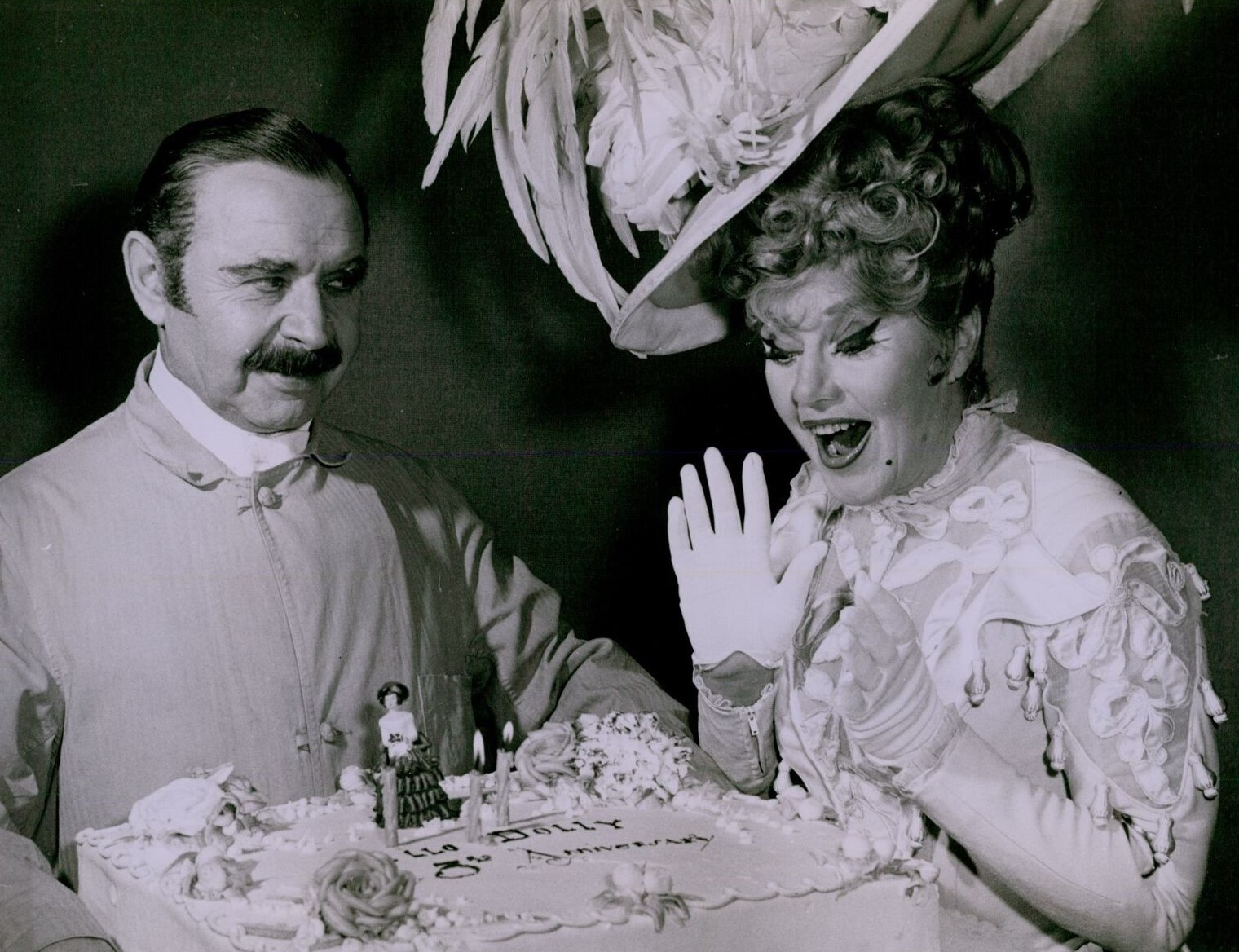
David Burns and Rogers in Hello, Dolly! on Broadway (1964)

In later life, Rogers remained on good terms with Astaire; she presented him with a special Academy Award in 1950, and they were copresenters of individual Academy Awards in 1967, during which they elicited a standing ovation when they came on stage in an impromptu dance. In 1969, she had the lead role in another long-running popular production, Mame, from the book by Jerome Lawrence and Robert Edwin Lee, with music and lyrics by Jerry Herman, at the Theatre Royal Drury Lane in the West End of London, arriving for the role on the liner Queen Elizabeth 2 from New York City. Her docking there occasioned the maximum of pomp and ceremony at Southampton. She became the highest-paid performer in the history of the West End up to that time. The production ran for 14 months and featured a royal command performance for Queen Elizabeth II.

In March 1976, Rogers opened a cabaret engagement at Waldorf-Astoria's Empire Room in New York City, performing classic songs and dances associated with her Hollywood career. The show, choreographed by Onna White, was described as gracious and nostalgic, earning several standing ovations on opening night.

From the 1950s onward, Rogers made occasional appearances on television, even substituting for a vacationing Hal March on The $64,000 Question. In the later years of her career, she made guest appearances in three different series by Aaron Spelling: The Love Boat (1979), Glitter (1984), and Hotel (1987), which was her final screen appearance as an actress. In 1985, Rogers fulfilled a long-standing wish to direct when she directed the musical Babes in Arms off-Broadway in Tarrytown, New York, at 74 years old. It was produced by Michael Lipton and Robert Kennedy of Kennedy Lipton Productions. The production starred Broadway talents Donna Theodore, Carleton Carpenter, James Brennan, Randy Skinner, Karen Ziemba, Dwight Edwards, and Kim Morgan. It is also noted in her autobiography Ginger, My Story.

=== 1988–1995: Final years and appearances ===
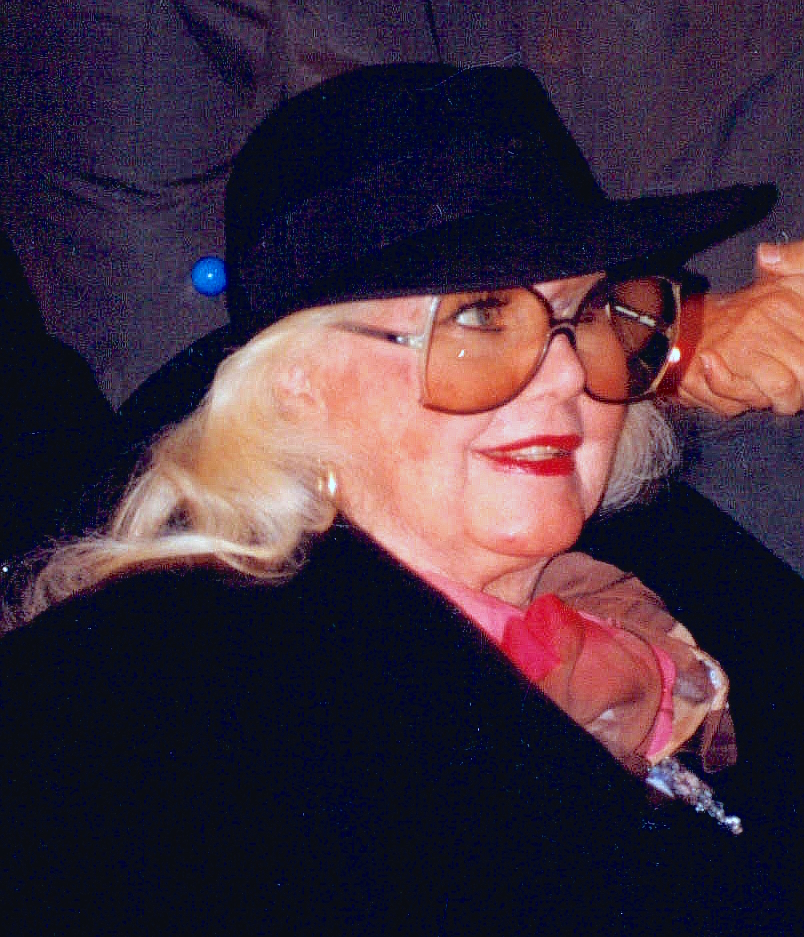
Rogers in 1993

In her later life, Rogers mainly resided at her ranch near Shady Cove, Oregon, a property she had purchased in 1941. After the property was sold, Rogers divided her time between homes in Medford, Oregon, and Rancho Mirage, California.

The city of Independence, Missouri designated the birthplace of Ginger Rogers a Historic Landmark property in 1994. That July 16, Ginger and her secretary, Roberta Olden, attended a “Ginger Rogers' Day” celebration presented by the city. The affixed a plaque to the building Rogers signed over 2,000 autographs at one of her last public appearances.

The home was purchased in 2016 by Three Trails Cottages, which restored, then transformed it into a museum dedicated to Ginger Rogers and her mother Lela. Open seasonally until 2019, it contained memorabilia, magazines, movie posters, and many items from the ranch the pair owned, and hosted numerous events.

Rogers made her last public appearance on March 18, 1995, when she received the Women's International Center (WIC) Living Legacy Award. For many years, Rogers regularly supported, and held in-person presentations, at the Craterian Theater, in Medford, where she had performed in 1926 as a vaudevillian. The theater was comprehensively restored in 1997 and posthumously renamed in her honor as the Craterian Ginger Rogers Theater.

== Personal life ==
=== Relationships and marriages ===
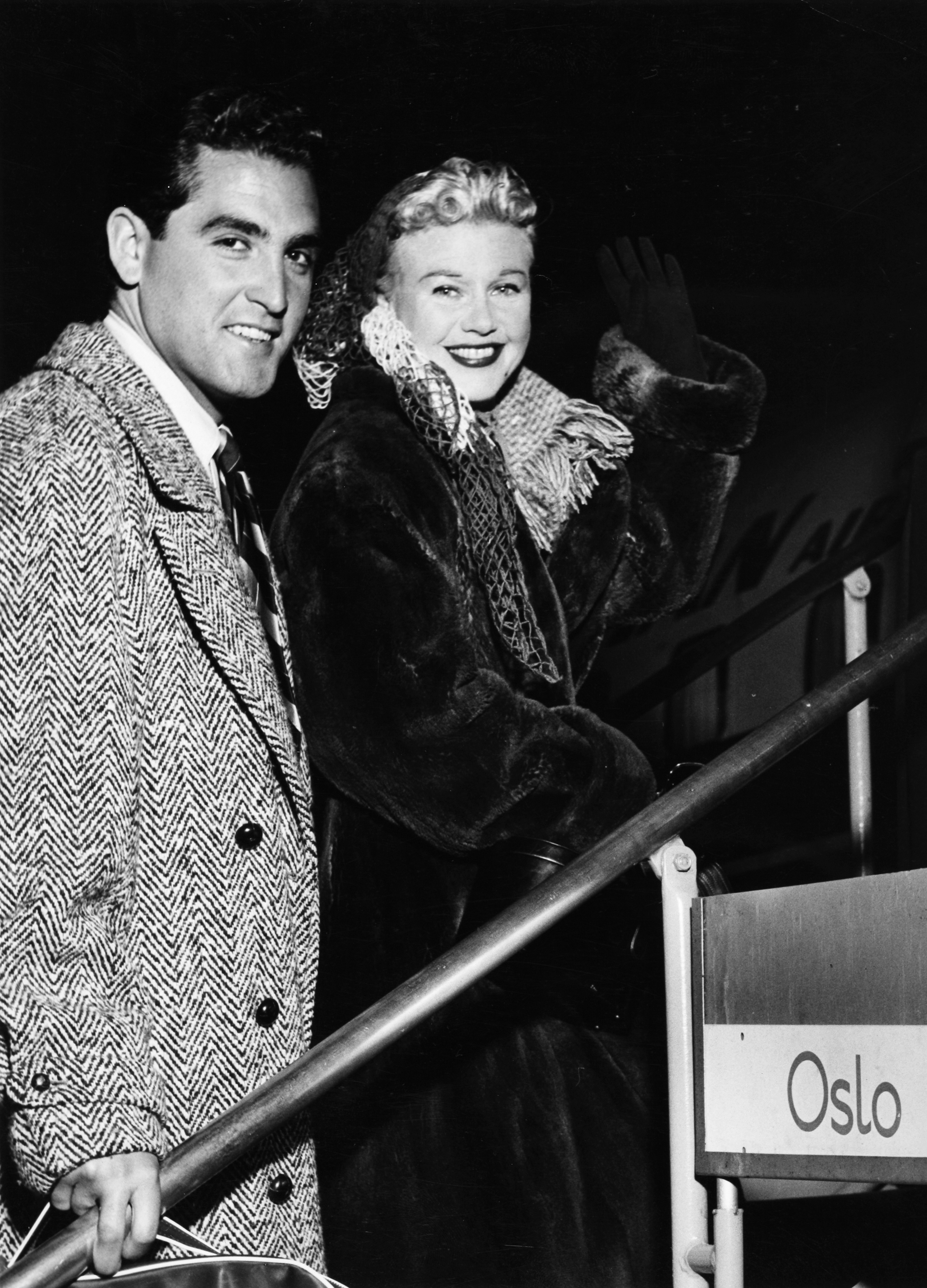
Rogers with husband Jacques Bergerac in the 1950s

Rogers married and divorced five times and had no children.

On March 29, 1929, Rogers married for the first time at age 17 to her dancing partner Jack Pepper (real name Edward Jackson Culpepper). They divorced in 1931, having separated soon after the wedding. Rogers dated Mervyn LeRoy in 1932, but they ended the relationship and remained friends until his death in 1987. In 1934, she married actor Lew Ayres. They separated in 1936 and divorced 4 years later in March 1940. On 16 January 1943, Rogers married her third husband, Jack Briggs, who was a U.S. Marine, before divorcing on 7 September 1949. In February 1953 she married Jacques Bergerac, a French actor 16 years her junior, whom she met on a trip to Paris. A lawyer in France, he came to Hollywood with her and became an actor. They divorced in July 1957. Her fifth and final husband was director and producer William Marshall. They married in 1961 and divorced in 1970, after his bouts with alcohol and the financial collapse of their joint film production company in Jamaica.

Rogers, an only child, remained close to her mother, Lela Rogers, throughout her life. Lela was credited with pivotal contributions to her daughter's early successes in New York City and in Hollywood, and gave her much assistance in contract negotiations with RKO. She also wrote a children's mystery book with her daughter as the central character.

Rogers was lifelong friends with actresses Lucille Ball and Bette Davis. She appeared with Ball in an episode of Here's Lucy on November 22, 1971, in which Rogers danced the Charleston for the first time in many years. Rogers starred in one of the earliest films co-directed and co-scripted by a woman, Wanda Tuchock's Finishing School (1934). Rogers maintained a close friendship with her cousin, writer/socialite Phyllis Fraser, the wife of Random House publisher Bennett Cerf. Rita Hayworth's maternal uncle, Vinton Hayworth, was married to Rogers's maternal aunt, Jean Owens. She and Rita were cousins.

=== Politics and beliefs ===
Rogers was a lifelong member of the Republican Party and campaigned for Thomas Dewey in the 1944 presidential election, Barry Goldwater in the 1964 presidential election and Ronald Reagan in the 1966 California gubernatorial election. She was a strong opponent of Franklin Delano Roosevelt, speaking out against both him and his New Deal proposals. She was a member of the Daughters of the American Revolution.

Rogers was raised a Christian Scientist and remained a lifelong adherent. Christian Science was a topic she discussed at length in her autobiography.

=== Interests ===
Rogers was a talented tennis player, and won the Texas State Charleston Championship in 1926. She later entered the 1950 US Open. However, she and Frank Shields were knocked out of the mixed doubles competition in the first round.

== Death and legacy ==
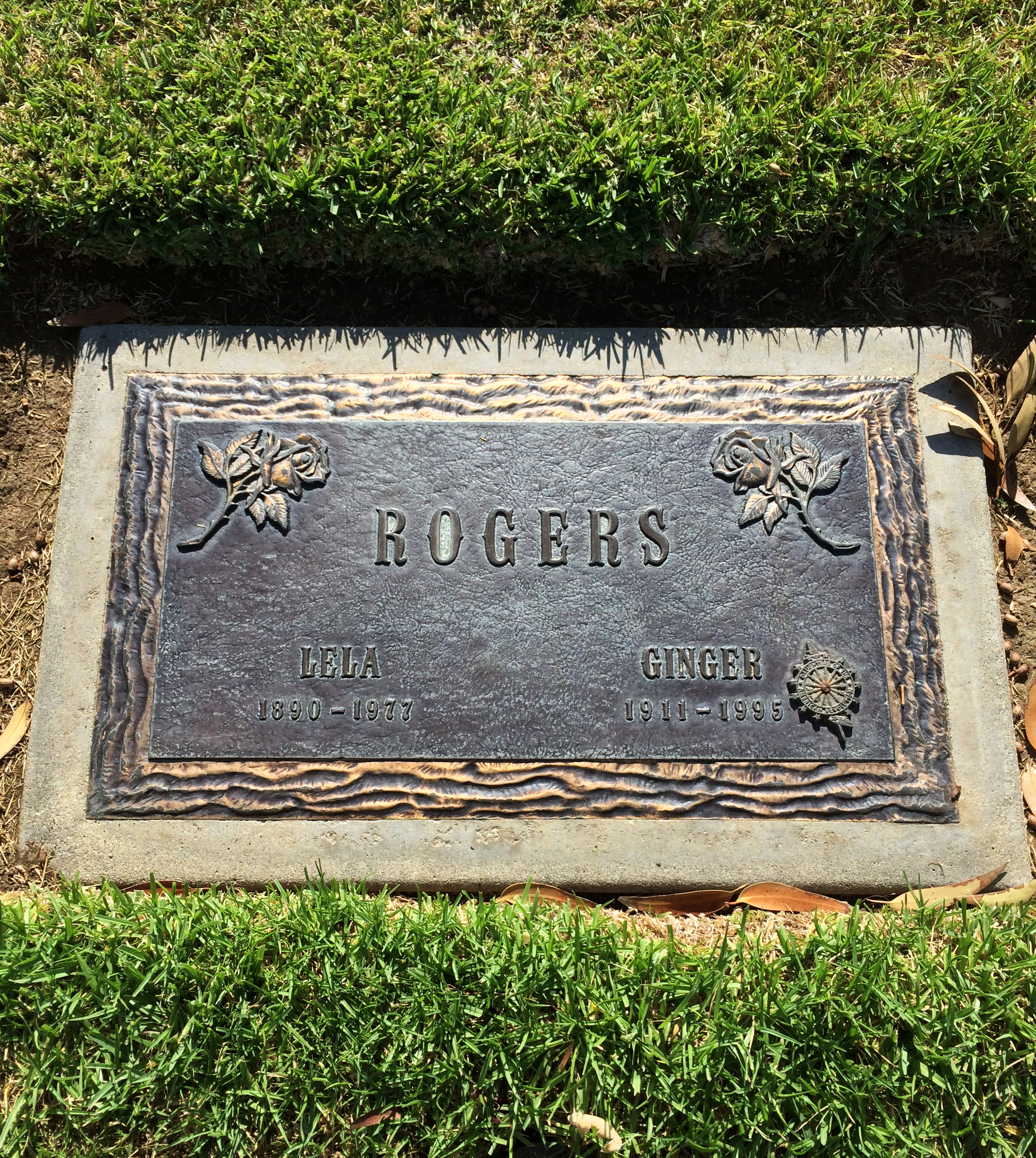
Grave of Ginger Rogers at Oakwood Memorial Park

Rogers died at her Rancho Mirage home on April 25, 1995, from a heart attack at the age of 83. She was cremated and her ashes interred with her mother Lela Emogene in Oakwood Memorial Park Cemetery in Chatsworth, California.

- Likenesses of Astaire and Rogers, apparently painted over from the "Cheek to Cheek" dance in Top Hat, are in the "Lucy in the Sky With Diamonds" section of The Beatles film Yellow Submarine (1968).
- Rogers's image is one of many famous women's images of the 1930s and 1940s featured on the bedroom wall in the Anne Frank House in Amsterdam, a gallery of magazine cuttings pasted on the wall created by Anne and her sister Margot while hiding from the Nazis. When the house became a museum, the gallery the Frank sisters created was preserved under glass.
- Ginger The Musical by Robert Kennedy and Paul Becker which Ginger Rogers approved and was to direct on Broadway the year of her death was in negotiations as late as the 2016–17 Broadway season. Marshall Mason directed its first production in 2001 starring Donna McKechnie and Nili Bassman and was choreographed by Randy Skinner.
- Rogers was the heroine of a novel, Ginger Rogers and the Riddle of the Scarlet Cloak (1942, by Lela E. Rogers), in which "the heroine has the same name and appearance as the famous actress, but has no connection ... it is as though the famous actress has stepped into an alternate reality in which she is an ordinary person." It is part of a series known as "Whitman Authorized Editions", 16 books published between 1941 and 1947 that featured a film actress as heroine.
- The Dancing House in Prague, sometimes known as Ginger and Fred, designed by the Croatian-Czech architect Vlado Milunić in cooperation with Canadian-American architect Frank Gehry and inspired by the dancing of Astaire and Rogers.
- In the 1981 film Pennies from Heaven, Bernadette Peters's character dances with Steve Martin's as they watch Fred and Ginger's "Let's Face the Music and Dance" sequence from 1936's Follow the Fleet, using it as their inspiration.
- Federico Fellini's film Ginger and Fred centers on two aging Italian impersonators of Ginger Rogers and Fred Astaire. Rogers sued the production and the distributor when the film was released in the U.S. for misappropriation and infringement of her public personality. Her claims were dismissed. According to the judgment, the film only obliquely related to Astaire and her.
- Rogers was among the sixteen Golden Age Hollywood stars referenced in the bridge of Madonna's 1990 single "Vogue".
- Rogers is the namesake of the Ginger Rogers, a cocktail containing gin, ginger, and mint.
- Rogers was the subject of a quotation summarizing women's capacity to achieve that is popular among feminists: "Rogers did everything [Astaire] did, backwards . . . and in high heels." The quote comes from a 1982 Frank and Ernest comic strip by Bob Thaves.
- A musical about the life of Rogers, entitled Backwards in High Heels, premiered in Florida in early 2007.
- She was portrayed by Jemma Donovan in Jimmy (2026).
- It was announced in September 2026 that Sabrina Carpenter would be portraying her in an upcoming Fred Astaire biopic, alongside Tom Holland as Astaire.

== Acting credits and accolades ==
| Award/association | Year | Category | Nominated work | Result | Ref. |
|---|---|---|---|---|---|
| Academy Awards | 1941 | Best Actress | Kitty Foyle | Won | |
| Golden Globe Awards | 1953 | Best Actress in a Motion Picture – Musical or Comedy | Monkey Business | Nominated | |
| Hollywood Walk of Fame | 1960 | Star - Motion Pictures | —N/a | Honored | |
| Hollywood Women's Press Club | 1941 | Sour Apple Award (Least Cooperative Actress) | —N/a | Won | |
| Kennedy Center Honors | 1992 | Lifetime Achievement Award | —N/a | Honored | |
| Photoplay Awards | 1967 | Special Editor's Award | Hello, Dolly! | Won | |

== See also ==
- List of actors with Academy Award nominations
- List of dancers

== Sources ==
- Astaire, Fred (August 5, 2008). Steps in Time (reprint ed.). HarperCollins. ISBN 978-0-061-56756-8.
- Baggelaar, Kristin (2012). Dancing With a Star: The Maxine Barrat Story. Baltimore, Maryland: Midnight Marquee Press. ISBN 978-1-936-16827-9.
- Basinger, Jeanine (2013) [1993]. A Woman's View: How Hollywood Spoke to Women, 1930-1960. New York City, New York: Knopf Doubleday. ISBN 978-0-307-83154-5.
- Blume, Lesley M. M. (2013). Let's Bring Back: The Cocktail Edition: A Compendium of Impish, Romantic, Amusing, and Occasionally Appalling Potations from Bygone Eras. San Francisco, California: Chronicle Books. ISBN 978-1-452-12128-4.
- Critchlow, Donald T. (2013). When Hollywood Was Right: How Movie Stars, Studio Moguls, and Big Business Remade American Politics. Cambridge, England: Cambridge University Press. ISBN 978-1-107-65028-2.
- Croce, Arlene (1977). The Fred Astaire and Ginger Rogers Book (reprint ed.). Vintage Books. ISBN 978-0-394-72476-8.
- Dietz, Dan (2019). The Complete Book of 1920s Broadway Musicals. Lanham, Maryland: Rowman & Littlefield. ISBN 978-1-442-24528-0.
- Ellrod, J. D. (2024). The Stars of Hollywood Remembered: Career Biographies of 82 Actors and Actresses of the Golden Era, 1920s-1950s. Jefferson, North Carolina: McFarland & Company. ISBN 978-1-476-60783-2.
- Faris, Jocelyn (1994). Ginger Rogers – a Bio-Bibliography. Westport, Connecticut: Greenwood Press. ISBN 978-0-313-29177-7.
- Epstein, Joseph (2012). Fred Astaire. New Haven, Connecticut: Yale University Press. ISBN 978-0-300-17352-9.
- Hyam, Hannah (2007). Fred and Ginger – The Astaire-Rogers Partnership 1934–1938. Brighton: Pen Press Publications. ISBN 978-1-905621-96-5.
- Kendall, Elizabeth (2002). The Runaway Bride: Hollywood Romantic Comedy of the 1930s. New York City, New York: Cooper Square Press. ISBN 978-0-815-41199-4.
- Knowles, Mark (2009). The Wicked Waltz and Other Scandalous Dances: Outrage at Couple Dancing in the 19th and Early 20th Centuries. Jefferson, North Carolina: McFarland & Company. ISBN 978-0-7864-5360-3.
- Mueller, John (1986). Astaire Dancing – The Musical Films of Fred Astaire. Hamish Hamilton. ISBN 978-0-241-11749-1.
- Rogers, Ginger (1991). Ginger: My Story. Toronto, Ontario: HarperCollins, Canada. ISBN 978-0-060-18308-0.
- Shearer, Lloyd (April 9, 1961). "One of the world's most fascinating women: Ginger Rogers". The Sunday Oregonian. pp. 6, 7, 8, 9 – via Newspapers.com.
- Ware, Susan (2004). "Ginger Rogers". Notable American Women: A Biographical Dictionary Completing the Twentieth Century. Cambridge, Massachusetts: Harvard University Press. p. 551. ISBN 978-0-6740-1488-6.
