= Albert S. McLemore =

Albert Sidney McLemore
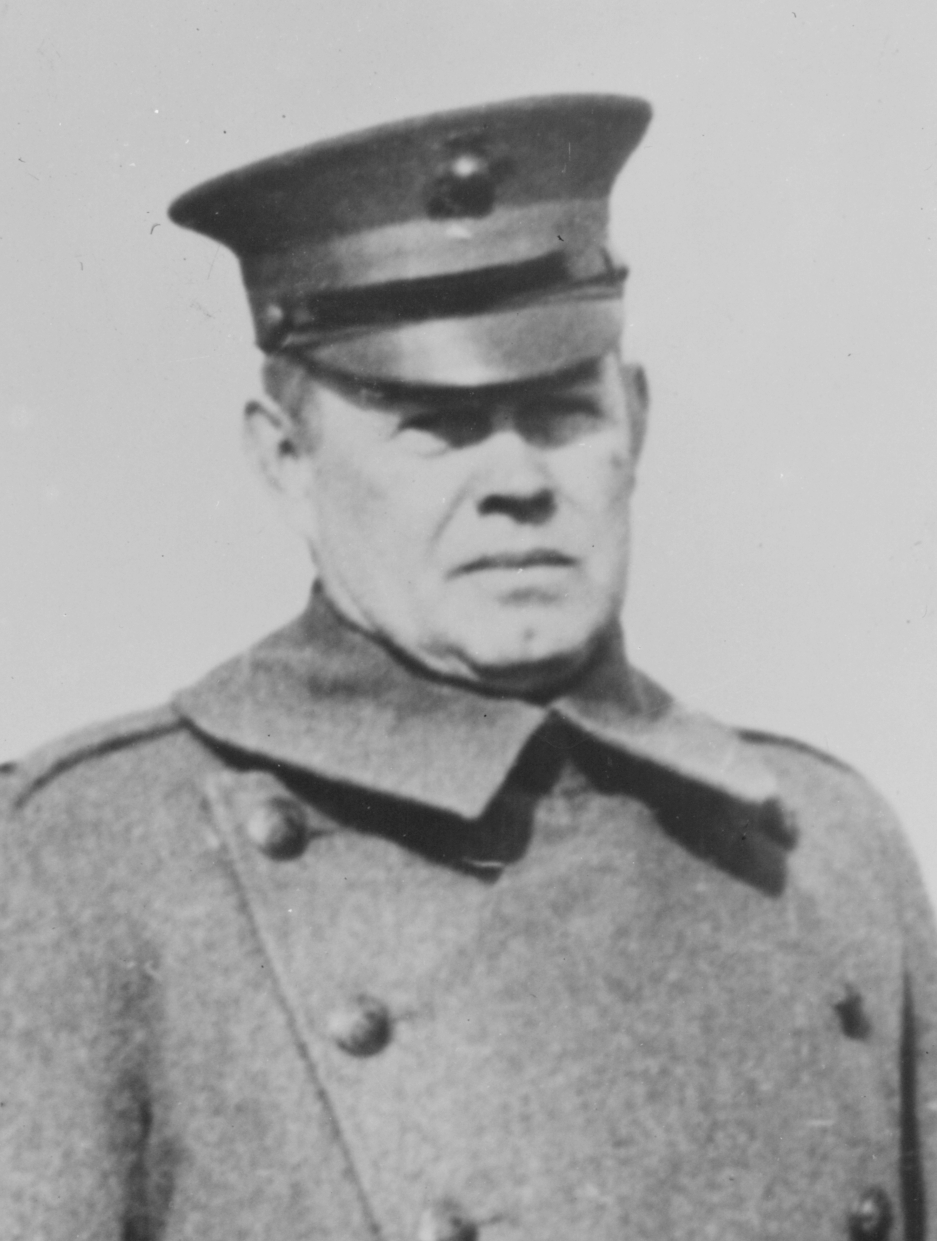
- Born: May 23, 1869; Murfreesboro, Tennessee
- Died: July 13, 1921 (aged 52); Mare Island, California
- Burial place: Arlington National Cemetery
- Military career
- Allegiance: United States of America
- Branch: United States Marine Corps
- Service years: 1893–1921
- Rank: Colonel
- Conflicts: Spanish–American War; World War I
- Awards: Marine Corps Brevet Medal

Albert Sidney McLemore (May 23, 1869—July 13, 1921) was an American officer serving in the United States Marine Corps during the Spanish–American War. He was approved to receive the Marine Corps Brevet Medal for bravery but died before it could be presented.

== Biography ==
McLemore was born in Murfreesboro, Tennessee on May 23, 1869, the son of William Sugars McLemore. After graduating from the United States Naval Academy in 1891 he accepted a commission in the United States Marine Corps. McLemore served in the Spanish–American War and during World War I was the officer in Charge of Marine Corps recruiting. He was approved to receive the Brevet Medal for gallantry in the Spanish–American War, but died before it could be presented. Since the brevet medal was not presented posthumously it was never given to his family and instead placed on display in the National Museum.

Major McLemore is credited with coining the Marine Corps recruiting slogan "First to Fight" ca. 1911 while assigned to the Marine Corps Recruiting Service. This phrase became part of the lyrics of The Marines Hymn.

He died at the Naval Hospital at Mare Island in Vallejo, California, on July 13, 1921, and is buried in Arlington National Cemetery.

== Marine Corps Brevet Medal citation ==
=== Secretary of the Navy citation ===
Citation

The Secretary of the Navy takes pleasure in transmitting to First Lieutenant, United States Marine Corps, the Brevet Medal which is awarded in accordance with Marine Corps Order No. 26 (1921), for distinguished conduct and public service in the presence of the enemy while serving with Company E, First Marine (Huntington's) Battalion, at Guantanamo, Cuba, on 11 June 1898. On 18 March 1901, First Lieutenant McLemore is appointed Captain, by brevet, to take rank from 11 June 1898.
