= Matt Turner (Neighbours) =

- Neighbours character
- Portrayed by: Josef Brown
- Duration: 2013–2016
- First appearance: 7 February 2013
- Last appearance: 9 August 2016
- Introduced by: Richard Jasek (2013); Jason Herbison (2016)
- Spin-off appearances: Neighbours vs Zombies (2014)
In-universe information
- Occupation: Senior Constable; Security guard
- Wife: Lauren Carpenter (1994–2015)
- Sons: Mason Turner; Bailey Turner
- Daughters: Amber Turner
- Stepdaughters: Paige Smith
- Granddaughters: Matilda Turner

Matt Turner is a fictional character from the Australian soap opera Neighbours, played by Josef Brown. The actor was cast shortly after he completed a guest stint on rival soap opera Home and Away. Brown relocated to Melbourne for filming and he shot his first scenes as Matt in October 2012. The character was created and introduced to Neighbours as the husband of Lauren Carpenter (Kate Kendall), who was reintroduced after nineteen years as part of a major overhaul of the show's cast. Matt made his first screen appearance alongside his family during the episode broadcast on 7 February 2013. Brown departed Neighbours on 25 March 2015, following Matt's death. Brown reprised the role for one episode on 9 August 2016.

Matt was introduced as the patriarch of the Turner family. He was a police officer with the local force, and portrayed as being stubborn, hard working, traditional and loyal. He also had a lesser seen softer, more fun side. Matt's storylines often revolved around his marriage to Lauren Carpenter (Kate Kendall) and their three children. Shortly after Matt's eldest son, Mason (Taylor Glockner), was introduced, it emerged that he had been in juvenile detention and Matt had been the arresting officer. Matt and Mason had to work through their issues quickly in order to protect the family from Robbo Slade (Aaron Jakubenko). Matt also developed a rivalry with Lauren's ex-boyfriend and neighbour, Brad Willis (Kip Gamblin), and learned that they had a daughter together. Matt was killed off as part of a storyline that highlighted the dangers of texting while driving. Matt received mostly positive attention from critics.

== Creation and casting ==
On 4 November 2012, it was announced that the five-strong Turner family would be introduced to Neighbours in February 2013. The family were created as part of a major overhaul of the show's cast. Of the Turners, Kate Kendall, who plays matriarch Lauren, explained "The producers were looking to get quite a traditional family in there and hark back to some of those old traditions and family values. They're going to be a really charismatic family, but you'll also get some really juicy storylines and that's what the audiences relate to. Viewers will relate to the familiarity of them and hopefully the sense of magnetism that we bring." The Turners were given an immediate link in Erinsborough through long-term resident Lou Carpenter (Tom Oliver), Lauren's father.

Actor Josef Brown was cast as Lauren's husband Matt Turner in October 2012. Brown was cast in the role shortly after he completed a guest stint on rival Australian soap opera Home and Away. He relocated from Sydney to Melbourne, where the Neighbours studios are based. On 13 November, Brown told Andrew Priestley from the Manly Daily that he had already been filming for four weeks and was enjoying getting to know his character. Brown also hinted that the Turner family would being "a few surprises" with them, saying "It's a great family and a little bit different. We've got a few secrets and a few dramas up our sleeves." Brown made his debut screen appearance as Matt on 7 February 2013.

== Development ==
=== Characterisation ===
Matt and his family came to Erinsborough from Mount Isa in Queensland. Matt was introduced as a sergeant with the local police force. Describing Matt, a writer for the show's official website said "He is a straight shooter who doesn't mince words or suffer fools." The writer called him stubborn, but said he often displays his soft and fun sides. Matt also works hard and holds traditional values. He is loyal to his family and will do anything for them. A writer for Channel 5's Neighbours website added, "Matt runs a tight ship, and sometimes rules the family home a little like it's a police station, believing that a firm-but-fair approach will be best for his kids in the long run."

=== Family ===
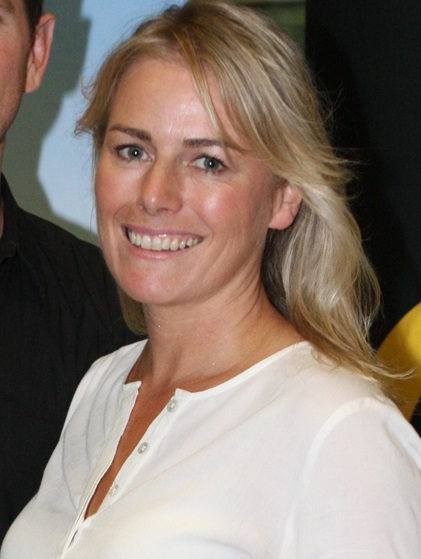
Matt was introduced to the show as the husband of returning character Lauren Carpenter, now played by Kate Kendall (pictured).

In his fictional backstory, Matt married Lauren Carpenter in 1994 and they had three children – Mason (Taylor Glockner), Amber (Jenna Rosenow) and Bailey (Calen Mackenzie). Only Amber and Bailey accompanied their parents to Erinsborough, leaving Matt and Lauren to explain that Mason had been delayed due to work. However, as Matt and Lauren settled in, it became clear they were hiding something. When Mason eventually arrived, it emerged that he had been in juvenile detention for robbery and that Matt had been the arresting officer. Glockner commented that Mason and Matt would have a few issues to sort out. He also said that Mason was carrying a lot of resentment towards his father, but he believed that Mason would be able to forgive Matt. After Mason's partner in crime, Robbo Slade (Aaron Jakubenko), turned up in Erinsborough, Glockner said Mason and Matt would "overcome their differences pretty quickly" and work together to protect the family from Robbo.

Instead of purchasing a house, Matt and Lauren decided to buy the local coffee shop. They were initially turned down for a loan, but Lauren convinced Matt that they would have enough money if they put everything they had into the coffee shop. When Paul Robinson (Stefan Dennis) made "a nasty comment" about their managerial skills, Matt quickly organised the sale. The venture got off to a bad start when the electricity went off on the first day. In 2015, the Turner children learned they owned Number 32, prompting Matt to try to buy back the house from them. Matt "encounters more obstacles" when Amber, Bailey and Paige dream up fun ways to spend the money they are getting.

=== Rivalry with Brad Willis ===
A few months after the Turner's moved onto Ramsay Street, Lauren was surprised when her ex-boyfriend, Brad Willis (Kip Gamblin), and his family also moved onto the street. Lauren decided not to tell Matt about her previous relationship with Brad as she was unsure how he would take the news. Gamblin agreed and said that as Matt was "a bit uptight", he did not know how he would cope knowing that his wife's ex-boyfriend was back in town. Brad ended up accidentally revealing the truth to Matt, as he was not aware that Matt did not know about him and Lauren. Gamblin explained, "Brad talks to Matt about it, assuming that Lauren's filled him in – which isn't the case! That causes tension – but Brad's just trying to have everything out in the open." Matt was left feeling "uneasy" about Brad and Lauren and Sophie Dainty from Digital Spy quipped that "Matt and Brad will not be quite as friendly in the coming months". Matt and Brad developed a rivalry, which came to a head during a dinner party. Matt was displeased at having to make small talk with Brad and as the evening went on the rivalry "intensified", leaving Matt and Brad's wives feeling embarrassed.

=== Lauren's long-lost daughter ===
Lauren later revealed that when she left Erinsborough in 1994 she was pregnant with Brad's child. She had not told anyone else, except her mother Kathy (Tina Bursill). A reporter for news.com.au commented that the information would have the potential to destroy Matt and Lauren's marriage. When Lauren eventually told Matt that she had a child with Brad, it caused shockwaves between the Turners and the Willises and "everyone feels betrayed by Lauren keeping the secret." After Lauren and Brad decided to find their long-lost daughter, Matt refused Brad's request to use his police contacts to find her, but his "overriding concern" for Lauren caused him to suggest that they hire a private investigator instead. Matt also helped Brad's wife, Terese (Rebekah Elmaloglou), come to terms with recent events with "some wise advice". Both Matt and Terese began to feel sidelined and Matt was disappointed when Lauren left for Adelaide with Brad to check out a lead. At the same time, Matt secretly organised a vow-renewal ceremony for himself and Lauren. Although Lauren promised to be back in time, it was little comfort to Matt, who was starting to suspect that she was putting her child with Brad over their marriage.

Newcomer Paige Smith (Olympia Valance) was later revealed to be Lauren and Brad's daughter. Terese also learned that Paige had trashed Harold's Store in a fit of rage. Matt was then placed in "an impossible situation", as he was forced to arrest his own stepdaughter. Lauren begged him to be lenient with Paige, but Matt explained that he could not give her any special treatment and he had to follow the law. In September 2014, a hospitalised Lou inadvertently referred to a secret Lauren was keeping, which caused Matt became suspicious and Lauren admitted that she had kissed Brad. After Terese learned about the kiss, she told Matt that they should keep a close eye on their respective spouses, but Matt was unsure about her plan. Brown penned a blog about Lauren and Brad's kiss for the show's official website, in which he wrote "Terese and Matt want to believe it was 'just the moment' and 'just a kiss'. As reasonable adults with full life experiences, that, they could understand and forgive." Brown went on to say that Matt and Terese were worried that the kiss meant something more to Brad and Lauren.

=== Corruption and departure ===
When Matt and Lauren suffered financial difficulties, Matt took on a second job as a security guard for "crooked businessman" Dennis Dimato (David Serafin). Matt was at Dimato's "beck and call" and when his relative Joey (Steven Sammut) committed a crime in front of him, Matt was powerless to arrest him, knowing that it would risk his job as a police officer. When Lauren mentioned to Mark Brennan (Scott McGregor) that Matt received a large amount of money from the police department, Brennan became suspicious and learned that Matt had actually received a bribe from Dimato. Brennan told Matt to confess, but allowed him to tell Lauren first. Matt broke down as he told Lauren the truth and their marriage became strained. Matt was "deeply upset" by Lauren's lack of support, considering he had supported her over her kiss with Brad. Brennan later came up with a plan to save Matt, without him having to tell the police about working for Dimato. When Matt later saw Lauren being comforted by Brad, he turned to alcohol and kissed Sharon Canning (Natasha Herbert). Matt went to Sharon's hotel room, but Terese stopped him from taking things further. Matt admitted to Terese that he thought it was too late to save his marriage, but she encouraged him to "man up". Matt apologised to Lauren and promised to make it up to her.

In March 2015, the character was killed off after he suffered fatal injuries following a hit-and-run. After Terese tells Brad about Sharon, he confronts Matt at the side of a road. Gamblin commented, "He's quite judgemental and angry with Matt." Brad fails to notice a car speeding toward them, but Matt does. Gamblin explained, "Matt, the hero that he is, pushes Brad out of the way and unfortunately ends up in front of the car." As Matt lays injured in the road, the car quickly leaves the scene. Matt then asks Brad to look after Lauren. Series producer Jason Herbison commented that it was a hard decision killing a character off, but the fallout would make for "compelling drama." It was later announced that the storyline was conceived in a bid to highlight the danger of texting while driving. Danni Ferguson (Laura McIntosh) was soon revealed to be the driver that hit Matt, after she was distracted by an incoming text message. Herbison explained that the issue was "so prevalent" and affected people's lives in a drastic way.

Brown reprised the role for one episode, which aired on 9 August 2016. Matt appears to Lauren in a dream, after she receives a marriage proposal from Brad.

== Storylines ==
Matt moves to Erinsborough with his family and takes a job at the local police station. When Matt and Lauren's eldest son, Mason, joins the family from juvie, Mason tells Matt that he will not forgive him for having him arrested. Matt investigates a spate of burglaries in Erinsborough with his new partner Kelly Merolli (Maya Aleksandra), and he suspects that Robbo Slade is behind them. The truth about the robbery in Mount Isa is revealed; Robbo set Mason up and Matt covered for Bailey, who took Lauren's car to help Mason. Lauren and Matt's marriage suffers, but his relationship with Mason improves. Mason is arrested for an attempted robbery at Lassiter's, and Matt and Bailey decide to confess to their roles in the Mount Isa robbery. Matt is demoted to Senior Constable. Matt and Toadfish Rebecchi (Ryan Moloney) become suspicious when Paul offers his lawyer's services to Mason for his court case. They convince Mason to switch lawyers, which results in Mason getting a good behaviour bond. Matt begins an uneasy friendship with Brad Willis, Lauren's former boyfriend.

Robbo returns to Erinsborough and Matt warns him away from his family. Robbo later dies after being involved in a hit-and-run. Matt is asked to take a step back from the case, when several members of his family become suspects. Matt realises that Mason turned to Paul for help instead of him, and their relationship is briefly strained. Matt finds a sketch that Lauren drew of Brad, and realises that she has been hiding it from him. They argue, but Lauren assures Matt that she does not have feelings for Brad. Lauren tells Matt that she gave birth to Brad's daughter shortly before she met him, and that her mother, Kathy (Tina Bursill), recently told her the child was adopted out. Matt is supportive and he also helps Brad's wife, Terese, who struggles with the revelation. Matt and Lauren renew their vows. Matt investigates Kate Ramsay's (Ashleigh Brewer) murder and arrests her killer Victor Cleary (Richard Sutherland). Matt and Lauren learn Bailey has a problem with alcohol, and Matt opens up to him about his alcoholic father.

Matt and Terese support each other when Brad and Lauren learn Paige Smith is their daughter. When Terese learns that Paige trashed Harold's Store, Matt is forced to arrest her. He later tells Lauren that Terese has been trying to get something on Paige ever since she discovered who she was. Lou inadvertently reveals that Lauren and Brad kissed and Matt contemplates leaving Lauren, but ultimately decides to work through their issues. However, he struggles to be open with his feelings and avoids Lauren by pulling extra shifts at work. Matt is tempted to have a one-night stand with Sharon Canning (Natasha Herbert), but returns home to Lauren and they talk through their issues. The children learn they own the house and Matt plans to buy it from them, as he is uncomfortable being their tenants. Despite worries over what the children will do with the money, the sale goes ahead. Matt then learns that there is no overtime at the station, so he gets a second job as a security guard to help pay the mortgage. When Matt discovers he is working for Dennis Dimato, a businessman he previously investigated, he quits the job.

Matt and Lauren ask Amber and Bailey for a loan. However, the family soon discover the money has been stolen and Matt is forced to ask Michelle Kim (Ra Chapman) for his job back. Matt becomes stressed about his money troubles and snaps at Bailey, blaming him for losing the money. Lauren and Matt think about selling the house. Matt discovers that Dimato is having cars stripped for parts. He confronts Dimato, who blackmails and bribes him into staying quiet. Matt tells Lauren that he has had a windfall, so they do not have to sell the house just yet. Matt is compromised when Joey Dimato is caught stealing, knowing that Joey could expose him, he lets him go. Matt ends his association with Dimato, but fellow police officer Mark Brennan witnesses their meeting. Matt tells Lauren the truth and decides to turn himself in, knowing he will get a prison sentence. Brennan offers Matt a deal – he will keep quiet, if Matt tells him everything he knows about Dimato's operations. Matt and Lauren's marriage suffers, and Matt turns to alcohol. Sharon Canning returns to town and Matt goes back to her hotel room, but Terese sees them and stops Matt from taking things further. Terese tells Brad about what happened, leading him to confront Matt on the side of the road. During their confrontation, a car driven by Danni Ferguson speeds towards them and Matt pushes Brad out of the way, taking the full impact of the vehicle. Matt suffers liver damage and undergoes surgery to repair it. Matt's condition later deteriorates and he is taken back into theatre, where he suffers massive blood loss and dies.

== Reception ==
The Daily Record's Tony Stewart observed that Matt was "barely able to keep a lid on his jealousy" when he saw Lauren and Brad in a compromising situation. When Steph kidnapped Patrick, Dianne Butler, writing for The Courier-Mail, quipped "I guess we'll now get to see what sort of mettle Officer Matt has, or if that uniform is like the cheerleaders outfits on Glee." Butler later observed that Matt was "never not on duty, he's like Freddy Krueger, he never takes his uniform off."

After Lauren revealed that she and Brad had a daughter, Laura Morgan from All About Soap speculated as to whether Matt and Terese could have an affair, calling them "outsiders to the situation" and adding "Will Mrs Willis turn to understanding Matt for a shoulder to cry on? It could be a brilliant twist to the tale!" When Matt and Lauren renewed their vows, a Daily Record reporter noted that they looked "a picture of happiness". Morgan later admitted that she was disappointed in Matt for listening to Terese and arresting Paige. She said "Whatever happened to family loyalty? Lauren's been on cloud nine since finding her daughter – why would he want to try to put a spanner in the works and ruin her happiness? We know he's got a duty as a copper, but he should just tell Terese to back off!"

Helen Vnuk of TV Week included Matt in her feature on soap heroes. She stated that "Matt wasn't perfect" and that his "ultimate sacrifice cost him his life." Of the character's time in the show, Joe Julians of Digital Spy wrote, "Poor old Matt. Introduced with the rest of his family in 2013, he was seemingly there just to be a stop gap before wife Lauren eventually reunited with old flame Brad Willis. A steady and dependable guy, his final few weeks saw him fall on the wrong side of the law, cheat on Lauren, and then get fatally mown down by a car while arguing with Brad."
