= Lauren Turner =

Fictional character from the Australian soap opera Neighbours

- Neighbours character
- Kate Kendall as Lauren (2015)
- Portrayed by: Sarah Vandenbergh (1993–1994); Kate Kendall (2013–2022)
- Duration: 1993–1994, 2013–2018, 2022
- First appearance: 16 February 1993
- Last appearance: 28 July 2022
- Introduced by: Ian Bradley (1993); Richard Jasek (2013); Jason Herbison (2018)
- Sarah Vandenbergh as Lauren (1993)
In-universe information
- Other names: Lauren Carpenter
- Occupation: Stablehand; Waitress; Book-keeper; Riding school owner; Owner of Harold's Store
- Family: Willis
- Father: Lou Carpenter
- Mother: Kathy Carpenter
- Brothers: Guy Carpenter
- Half-sisters: Ling Mai Chan; Lolly Allen (adoptive)
- Husband: Matt Turner (1994–2015); Brad Willis (2016–)
- Sons: Mason Turner; Bailey Turner
- Daughters: Paige Smith; Amber Turner
- Stepsons: Ned Willis
- Stepdaughters: Piper Willis; Imogen Willis
- Grandsons: Gabriel Smith; Freddie
- Granddaughters: Matilda Turner
- Aunts: Brenda Riley

Lauren Turner (also Carpenter) is a fictional character from the Australian soap opera Neighbours, played by Kate Kendall. The role was originally played by Sarah Vandenbergh, and she made her first appearance during the episode broadcast on 16 February 1993. Lauren was introduced as the "vivacious" daughter of Lou Carpenter (Tom Oliver). Vandenbergh described her as being happy, headstrong and into horses. She also thought that just by looking at the character you knew she was a girl next door type. Lauren's major storylines during her first stint in the show saw her have an affair with Brad Willis (Scott Michaelson), join a religious cult and begin a casual relationship with Wayne Duncan (Jonathon Sammy-Lee). Vandenbergh decided to leave the serial when she was told that Lauren would not feature prominently in storylines anymore. She departed on 2 March 1994.

On 4 November 2012, it was announced Lauren would be returning to Neighbours with Kendall taking over the role. She made her first appearance as Lauren on 7 February 2013. Upon her return, Lauren brought her family with her and Kendall described them as "charismatic", saying they would have some secrets and "really juicy storylines". Kendall's Lauren is portrayed as being "down to earth", "warm" and "very social". Her storylines since her return have often focused on family issues, including the arrival of her and Brad's long-lost daughter Paige Smith (Olympia Valance), the death of her husband Matt Turner (Josef Brown), and her reunion and marriage to Brad (now Kip Gamblin). The character departed on 7 April 2017, along with Brad, before making guest returns in June 2017, March and June 2018, and for the show's final episode on 28 July 2022.

== Casting ==
Vandenbergh joined the cast of Neighbours in 1993 to play the "vivacious" daughter of Lou Carpenter (Tom Oliver). It was her first major television role and she relocated from Sydney to Melbourne for filming. Vandenbergh told Sue Malins of Soaplife that her workload was gruelling and she had a crazy work schedule during her time on the show. The actress said it was tough for the younger cast members who had come straight from school, but as she was twenty, she could deal with it.

Vandenbergh decided to leave Neighbours because of a decision made by production staff that Lauren would not feature prominently in storylines. After Lauren had been used to play central stories out such as sexually transmitted diseases, they planned to give her a "quieter time" working in the coffee shop. Vandenbergh told Mary Fletcher from Woman's Own, "I didn't want that, after so much had happened, I wasn't going to hang around in the background. And you can only go so far with a job before you stop learning anything new."

In May 1996, Vandenbergh revealed to the Daily Mirror's Fiona Parker that another reason she chose to leave Neighbours was because nobody was letting her be anyone else except Lauren. She admitted that she hated the press writing about her during her time in the show, although said added that she had no regrets about appearing in Neighbours as it was a great experience for her.

== Development ==
=== Characterisation ===
Vandenbergh revealed that she did not get much of a synopsis about her character's personality and had to establish herself as Lauren during the first week on air. She told a writer for SOAP magazine, "The only real brief I was given was her relationship with her mother and father and the fact that she was really headstrong and right into horses, and that's about it. To this day I still don't know what her birthday is." The actress stated that when you looked at Lauren you knew she was the girl next door and went on to describe her as "really happy". She added "I looked so Australian with my pony tail and my horsey clothes on and no make-up, so I was the ideal Lauren even before I'd read the scripts." Lauren is the daughter of Lou and Kathy Carpenter (Tina Bursill) and the sister of Guy Carpenter (Andrew Williams) and Ling Mai Chan (Khym Lam).

Lauren grew up with her mother, Kathy, following the breakdown of her parents' marriage. Kathy made Lauren study hard, while time with Lou was more fun. This led Lauren to grow up wanting to please her father and she started working with horses because Lou was a keen rider. Lauren arrived in Erinsborough on her horse Chucka Mental. The storyline was brought in because Oliver had a passion for them, but Vandenbergh revealed that she was unused to horses and had to have a course of intense riding lessons prior to filming. She said "The week before I started on the show I had an accident and the bruising on my leg was the size of a football! There I was having to ride a horse on screen when I could barely walk on to the set!" She called the horse that played Chucka Mental "amazing" and revealed that he had starred in The Man from Snowy River, so he understood the word "action".

Following the character's return in 2013, Lauren had become more mature and family focused. The official website says, "A natural mother, she is a warm, tactile woman, who doesn't believe her kids will ever be too old for a big hug and a mug of hot chocolate when they're feeling down." The character was also described as being happy and "down to earth". Lauren has often put her role as the Turner family matriarch first, but she has dreams of being an artist. By moving to Erinsborough, Lauren was able to reconnect with her father Lou, with whom she shares "a warm relationship". Kendall told Daniel Kilkelly of Digital Spy that Lauren would settle in and make friends easily, as she is a "very social" person. She also shared a history with some of the characters, so she was not unfamiliar with everyone. Kendall did not think she shared many similarities with her character. She called Lauren "a domestic goddess" and said that she did not do any baking in real life. She also thought Lauren was more grounded than she was. The actress added that she did have a mixed family like Lauren, so she could relate to what her character went through with Brad and Paige.

=== Relationship with Brad Willis ===
Lauren caught the eye of Brad Wills (Scott Michaelson) while she was riding her horse along the beach and Josephine Monroe, author of Neighbours: The First 10 Years, commented that there was an "instant attraction" between them. While writing for Inside Soap, Monroe said the chemistry between Brad and Lauren was set to blow his romance with Beth Brennan (Natalie Imbruglia) apart. Vandenbergh revealed that Lauren would become really good friends with Beth, saying "They're really compatible and they just click, so when Lauren realises what's going on between her and Brad it gets really tricky." Vandenbergh thought that the storyline would become "a very interesting love triangle." After having sex on the beach, Brad and Lauren began an affair in secret. Monroe stated that Lauren could not even tell her father as he had become fond of Beth, while they were lodging together. When Lauren missed her period, she became worried that she was pregnant with Brad's child. She hid her fear, but Lou discovered her secret when he spotted a pregnancy test in the cupboard. Lauren confessed the truth to Lou, who was "shocked", but stood by his daughter. The pregnancy test was negative, but Lou persuaded Lauren to go to the doctor and she was informed that she had chlamydia, which can bring on the signs of pregnancy.

Despite his affair with Lauren, Brad still intended to go through with his wedding to Beth. On the day of the ceremony, Beth finally learnt what had been happening between her finance and her best friend. Imbruglia explained "They walk down the aisle together, but Beth is a bit unsure because that morning she sees Lauren and Brad together. And then she notices that Brad is just constantly looking at Lauren, and she just says 'Wait a minute, I don't think I can go through with this." After Beth jilted Brad, he and Lauren continued their relationship openly and Brad became "besotted" with her. However, Lauren's horse became jealous of Brad and he began gambling. Brad eventually took a break the relationship when he got a job on a cruise ship. While he was away, Lauren met and began dating Connor Cleary (Brian Mannix). When Brad returned, Lauren called things off with Connor. Monroe wrote that it soon became clear that the chemistry between Lauren and Brad was just "an inconclusive experiment" and they eventually broke up. Brad got back together with Beth, who never forgave Lauren for what she did.

=== Cult ===
In October 1993, Lauren befriended Jacob Collins (John K. Davies) and Ruth Avery (Caitlin McDougall) a pair of "fanatics" and members of the Children of Barabbas, a religious sect. As Lauren became closer to Jacob and Ruth, she was lured into joined the cult. Jim Schembri from The Age commented "She promptly turned into a religious nut and caused trouble in the coffee shop, from where she was promptly sacked". Lauren's friends turned against her and her father became "distraught" as Lauren became more and more influenced by the cult. He grew concerned that she was being brainwashed and worried that he would lose her for good. When Lauren went on a retreat with Jacob and Ruth, Barrabas (Aidan Fennessy), the leader of the Children of Barabbas asked her to have sex with him. This brought Lauren to her senses and she had to ask Lou to rescue her. Shortly after the scenes aired in Australia, the British soap opera Brookside featured a similar plot involving a cult. They were accused of copying storylines, though the serial's executive producer, Mal Young, insisted that it was coincidental because they were both trying to reflect the society of that time.

=== Wayne Duncan ===
Lauren began a casual romance with neighbour, Wayne Duncan (Jonathon Sammy-Lee) in early 1994. The relationship came about almost by accident and was initially helped along by Wayne's "matchmaking" brother, Troy (Damian Walshe-Howling). When Lauren got drunk at a dinner party, Wayne offered to walk her home and she grabbed him on the doorstep and kissed him in front of their friends. Sammy-Lee revealed "Then, when she invites him in for coffee, she spills milk on her blouse and takes it off. Wayne does the gentlemanly thing by covering her up with his jacket and putting her to bed. But Lauren reads more into it." The following day, Lauren woke up and was unable to remember what happened, so she assumed she had had sex with Wayne. The truth was eventually explained to Lauren and the incident made sure that her romance with Wayne got off to "a shaky start". Fletcher commented that friendship turned to lust for both characters during the storyline.

=== Reintroduction ===
During an October 2012 interview with a What's on TV writer, Oliver hinted that Lauren would be coming back to Neighbours, but without Vandenbergh in the role. On 4 November 2012, it was confirmed that the character would be returning and actress Kate Kendall had taken over the part. Kendall was asked to audition for the role, following a previous guest appearance on the show. Of her casting, Kendall stated "It's exciting to be joining Australia's longest running drama and to be working with such an array of experienced actors. To be playing a character such as Lauren Turner, who is deeply embedded in the storyline and who of course is Lou Carpenter's daughter, is such a wonderful opportunity." Lauren made her return during the episode broadcast on 7 February 2013. Lauren returned to Erinsborough along with her husband, Matt Turner (Josef Brown), and their three children; Mason (Taylor Glockner), Amber (Jenna Rosenow) and Bailey (Calen Mackenzie). Kendall revealed that a few original facts about Lauren would remain, like her love for horses, but she wanted to "create something fresh" that she could fit into.

Kendall called Lauren's family a "very strong" unit. She explained "There are also a lot of secrets they have in the family and we'll see those play out. The producers were looking to get quite a traditional family in there and hark back to some of those old traditions and family values. They're going to be a really charismatic family, but you'll also get some really juicy storylines and that's what the audiences relate to. Viewers will relate to the familiarity of them and hopefully the sense of magnetism that we bring." Kendall said Lauren has "a big heart" and is the centre of her family, but she had been looking for some interesting ways to portray her, so that she does come across as too much of a domestic goddess. Kendall explained "She is a wife and a mother that on the surface could look quite bland and I wanted to take her out of that area. She has secrets which makes the character more interesting. It gives her a bit of an edge. Otherwise she could come off as perfect." Shortly after the Turner family moved to Ramsay Street, the Willis family, led by Brad (now played by Kip Gamblin), also moved onto the street. Lauren's feelings for Brad came "rushing back" and she initially chose not to tell Matt about their romantic history.

=== Long-lost daughter ===
In the 2013 season finale, Lauren told Lucy Robinson that when she left Erinsborough in 1994 she was pregnant with Brad's child. She had not told anyone else, except her mother Kathy, who then helped her to hide the pregnancy. The baby died shortly after being born and "feelings of grief still engulf Lauren." A reporter for news.com.au commented that the information would have the potential to destroy Lauren's marriage to Matt. It later emerged that Lauren and Brad's daughter is still alive, and they embarked on a search for her. While following a lead in Adelaide, Lauren and Brad shared a kiss. Kendall explained that the address they have no longer exists, leaving them "wounded by the events of the day". Kendall continued, "Lauren is just emotionally drained and they both need comfort. It starts as a hug, and then turns into a kiss." Feeling guilty, Lauren flew home to her family, where she was surprised to discover that Matt had arranged for them to renew their vows. Lauren decided to keep the kiss from Matt, but did confide in her father.

Shortly after Lauren and Brad gave up their search, their daughter, Paige Smith (Olympia Valance), turned up in Erinsborough looking for them. Keeping her identity a secret, Paige secures a job at Harold's Store, where she and Lauren make a good first impression on each other and develop a connection. Kendall admitted that she and Gamblin loved the long-lost daughter storyline and she believed that it added another layer to her character. She also said that as the storyline had gone along, it had exposed Lauren's faults and the "cracks in her personality." Kendall explained that when Lauren discovered Paige was her daughter, it came as "a huge shock", but Lauren was happy.

=== Matt's death and marriage to Brad ===
In March 2015, Matt and Lauren's marriage was suffering, as he had resorted to working for a criminal to pay their debts. Matt was "deeply upset" by Lauren's lack of support, as he had forgiven her for kissing Brad. Days later, Matt was struck by a speeding car after pushing Brad out of the way. While he lay injured in the road, Matt asks Brad to take care of Lauren. He later dies in hospital. Lauren was "determined to stay strong" on the day of Matt's funeral, but Brad notices that she is struggling with her grief and he later finds an "overwhelmed" Lauren at home, where he tells her about Matt's final words to him. When Terese suspects that Lauren is getting too close to Brad, she sets Lauren up on a date with graphic designer Robin Dawal (Max Brown), with whom Lauren shares a mutual interest in art with. Terese organises for Lauren to show Robin around some art galleries and they get on well. Brad is jealous when he notices how close they are, and he later warns Robin to stay away from Lauren.

In an interview with Inside Soap, Kendall thought it would be "a bit mad" if something did not happen between Brad and Lauren in the future. Brad learns Paige has been plotting to get him and Lauren back together, and assures Terese that she does not have anything to worry about. However, when the power goes out at Lauren's house, Paige asks Brad to come over and help out. He and Lauren run into each other in the garden and share "a charged moment". The following month, amidst Brad and Terese's marriage struggles and her alcoholism, Brad and Lauren finally admitted their feelings for one another and had sex. The plot began with Brad leaving his home after an argument with Terese. He plans to spend the night at a motel, but realises he has left his wallet at Lauren's place, having been there earlier in the day. Brad and Lauren begin talking, which leads to them kissing and Brad stays the night with her. Of their reaction the following morning, Gamblin explained "They're pleased it's happened, but they do soon realise they're in trouble because the real world is waiting for them outside – and the real world is Terese and the kids, and the reality of what they've done."

Brad and Lauren plan to tell Terese what has happened, but they change their minds when she announces that she wants to get help for her drinking problem. Brad and Lauren agree to wait, so their confession does not affect Terese's recovery efforts. However, she later views drone footage of Brad and Lauren kissing, which leads to a big confrontation in Lauren's backyard. The scenes formed the show's first three-hander episode. Gamblin stated that Brad wanted to be with Lauren, as he was no longer happy in his marriage. He added, "Oh, man, it's gonna be hard! Brad moves across the road! Does he really think that will work? But it does create plenty more drama..."

Matt returns to Lauren in a dream, and Kendall was pleased to have Brown back for the scenes. She stated, "When I looked at the scenes on paper, I wondered how we'd make it work. You just have to completely surrender yourself to the dream-like state of it and accept that, because anything goes in a dream." Kendall thought the dream showed Lauren that while she might have moved on from Matt too fast, it also allowed her to let go of a part of him too. When Brad first proposes to Lauren, she turns him down. Kendall said Lauren was very unprepared for the proposal, as she had not been thinking about marriage at all. Kendall also thought Lauren was still feeling some guilt for the way she and Brad got together. Brad enlisted some help from British singer Jamie Lawson for his second proposal, which Lauren accepts.

Lauren and Brad marry a few months later. They take part in a choreographed dance routine up the aisle, before they say their vows. At the reception, Maxine Cowper (Kate Hood) arrives in the middle of the bridal waltz, which annoys Lauren. Lauren's parents also hold a symbolic wedding ceremony of their own. Kendall commented, "Lauren thinks it's odd, though in a good way."

=== Departure and returns ===
On 27 March 2017, it was confirmed that Kendall would be leaving the show, along with Gamblin. Both actors filmed their final scenes in late 2016 before the annual production break. On-screen, Brad and Lauren decide to leave Erinsborough for a new start on the Gold Coast. They departed on 7 April. Lauren returned from 1 June, after Paige gives birth and is rushed to hospital. She returned the following year for her grandson Gabriel Smith's (Kian Bafekrpour) naming day in March, and again in June. Kendall reprised her role for the serial's final episode broadcast in 2022 where Lauren attends the wedding of Toadie and Mel and celebrates with Paige and Terese at their reception street party.

== Storylines ==
=== 1993–1994 ===
"Lauren broke up a marriage, lost her boyfriend, hurt her back, lost her job, then turned to religion, all in the space of 13 months."

— Vandenbergh on Lauren's storylines

Lauren arrives in Erinsborough on her horse Chucka Mental much to the surprise of her father, Lou. While riding on the beach, Lauren catches the eye of Brad Willis. Lauren soon learns Brad is engaged to Beth Brennan, who is lodging with her and Lou. There is clearly an attraction between Lauren and Brad and they give into it by having sex on the beach. Lauren feels guilty but continues to see Brad. When Brad's cousin, Cameron Hudson (Benjamin Grant Mitchell) asks Lauren out on a date, she accepts to ward off suspicion. Cameron then discovers Brad and Lauren's affair and leaves Erinsborough in disgust. On the day of Brad and Beth's wedding, Beth realises the truth and can see the attraction between Brad and Lauren, who is her bridesmaid and calls off the ceremony.

Lauren and Brad become a couple shortly after an STD scare. Brad develops a gambling addiction and leaves Erinsborough to work on a cruise ship as a distraction for several months. In Brad's absence, Lauren finds company in the form of Irish Jockey, Connor Cleary. Connor asks Lauren to come away to Hong Kong with him, but she ultimately refuses. When Brad returns, Lauren finds him in a compromising situation when he is zipping up the back of his ex-girlfriend Lucy Robinson's (Melissa Bell) dress when she visits him at home to welcome him back. Brad assures her nothing is going on between him and Lucy, but he and Lauren end things.

Lauren is crushed when she learns Brad and Beth are getting back together. Shortly after, Lauren suffers a back injury while riding and is later drawn into a religious cult by new friends Jacob and Ruth. Lou and all of Lauren's friends are concerned for her but she is unwilling to listen. The leader of the cult, Barabbas tries to get Lauren to have sex with him but she manages to escape. Shortly after Brad and Beth marry and leave for Perth, Lauren finds herself in the company of Wayne, who previously dated Beth. They begin dating, but this fizzles out. When Lou moves his new girlfriend Cheryl Stark (Caroline Gillmer) and her teenage children Brett (Brett Blewitt) and Danni (Eliza Szonert) into the house, Lauren feels squeezed out and is relieved when her old boss offers her job back and she leaves for Queensland.

=== 2013–2022 ===
Lauren returns to Erinsborough with her husband, Matt, and their three children; Mason, Amber and Bailey. They stay with Lou at Number 32 Ramsay Street and Lauren finds employment at Harold's Store. Lauren and Matt become concerned when Mason does not immediately join them following his release from juvie. When Mason does turn up, he assures Lauren that he has changed his ways. Lauren learns the family are keeping several secrets from her, including Amber's secret relationship with Robbo Slade (Aaron Jakubenko), that Bailey had been present at the warehouse robbery that Mason took part, and that Matt had allowed him to get away. Lauren and Matt's marriage suffers as a result of the revelations. Mason is arrested for another attempted armed robbery, putting further strain on the family. Brad moves onto Ramsay Street with his wife Terese (Rebekah Elmaloglou) and their children. Lauren tries to keep her past relationship with Brad a secret from Matt, but Brad accidentally tells him. Lauren and Matt purchase Harold's Store. Robbo returns to Erinsborough and threatens the Turners. Frustrated by Robbo's hold over her family, Lauren sends him an email asking him to meet with her, but they do not meet and Robbo later dies after being hit by a car.

Matt discovers an old sketch that Lauren drew of Brad and realises that she has been deliberately trying to hide it from him. They argue and Matt briefly moves out of their bedroom. Lucy returns to town and Lauren tells her that she gave birth to Brad's daughter when she first left Erinsborough. Lauren explains that there were complications during the birth and her daughter died. Lauren's mother, Kathy, visits and admits the baby was adopted out, as Kathy did not think Lauren could cope with a child then. Lauren tells her family and Brad about the baby, and they try to find her. Brad gets a lead in Adelaide and he and Lauren fly out. They spend the night together in a hotel and they kiss. Lauren then returns home and finds that Matt has organised a vow renewal ceremony for them. Lauren takes the newly arrived Paige Novak under her wing and gives her a job. Kathy returns and when she suffers a heart attack, Lauren rushes to her side. Lauren realises her daughter is close by when she finds a teddy bear she gave to her outside the house. She learns that Paige had the bear and chases after her, realising that she is her daughter. They are reunited and Lauren takes Paige to see Brad.

Lou inadvertently reveals Lauren and Brad's kiss to Matt, and he struggles with her betrayal. Matt and Lauren work through their problems, and Paige moves in with them. Lauren becomes concerned about Rain Taylor's (Airlie Dodds) influence on Amber, as it reminds her of her time with the Barabbas cult. She gets Rain's application to set up a commune declined and forces her out of Erinsborough. The children learn they own the house and Matt and Lauren buy it from them, as Matt is uncomfortable being their tenants. The money from the sale is stolen, causing Lauren and Matt huge financial strain. Their relationship suffers again when Matt admits that he has taken bribes. Lauren pleads with Mark Brennan (Scott McGregor) to help Matt and he agrees not to tell their superiors in exchange for information. Lauren and Matt work on their problems. Matt is involved in a hit-and-run and dies in the hospital. Lauren is devastated and struggles with her grief. Bailey also struggles and turns to alcohol. Lauren has him charged for using Matt's police badge to impersonate a police officer. When Lou decides to move to Queensland to be closer to Guy, he takes Bailey with him. Lauren becomes dependent on Brad, to Terese's concern, and their bond grows when Amber reveals she is pregnant with Brad's son Josh's (Harley Bonner) baby.

While Terese is away, Lauren comes over for dinner and she and Brad fall asleep on the sofa. Susan Kennedy (Jackie Woodburne) sees Lauren leaving Brad's house the following morning and challenges Brad on how Terese would feel if she found out. Brad subsequently steps back from their friendship. Terese encourages Lauren and corporate artist Robin Dawal (Max Brown) to spend time together. Lauren turns down Robin's offer of a dinner date, as she is not ready to move on from Matt. Lauren learns Matt almost had an affair with Sharon Canning (Natasha Herbert). The arrival of Paige's adoptive mother Mary Smith (Gina Liano) and the truth about the illegal adoption brings Lauren and Brad closer together. They later acknowledge that they have feelings for each other. After Brad has an argument with Terese, he and Lauren have sex. Afterwards, Lauren urges Brad not to tell Terese immediately, fearful it will knock her attempts to stop drinking. However, Terese sees a drone picture of them kissing, and confronts them, pushing Lauren into the pool in a confrontation. Lauren and Brad try to keep their distance, but Lauren invites him to move in with her until he finds somewhere to live. However, when Amber gives Brad her blessing, he decides to stay and they become a couple.

Harold's is renovated, but trashed on its opening day, and Lauren blames Terese; however, it is later revealed that Liam Barnett (James Beck) was the real culprit. Lauren helps out at the school sleep-out, and becomes trapped with Terese when an explosion causes lockers to collapse on them. Brad pulls Lauren from the building first. Lauren ends her relationship with Brad after he moves back home to look after an injured Terese. They soon get back together and Brad moves in again. Lauren also allows Brad's father Doug to move in, but is unnerved when Doug, who is suffering from Alzheimer's, mistakes her for his wife Pam Willis (Sue Jones) and kisses her. Lauren comforts Brad when Josh and Doug die following an explosion at Lassiter's Hotel. Lauren helps Brad's eldest son Ned Willis (Ben Hall) rebuild his relationship with his father and grandmother. Ned develops feelings for Lauren and kisses her, causing a strain on Brad and Lauren's relationship. Brad proposes to Lauren following his divorce party, but she turns him down. She later accepts a second proposal. Brad's daughter Piper Willis (Mavournee Hazel) organises a hot air balloon ride for Lauren's hen party. During the ride, the burner goes out and the balloon crashes to the ground. Lauren suffers a broken ankle. Ahead of the wedding, Lauren's parents arrive and inform her that they had a one-night stand. Brad and Lauren marry, while Lou and Kathy decide to have a ceremonial vow renewal. At the reception, Maxine Cowper (Kate Hood) turns up and Brad reveals that he has been paying her rent, after Ned burnt down her house. Brad apologises to Lauren for not telling her and she forgives him. Lauren learns that her granddaughter, Matilda, is very sick and Amber has had to leave work to care for her. Lauren and Brad decide to leave for the Gold Coast to join them and they drive out of Ramsay Street with the family wishing them luck.

Lauren returns to Erinsborough a few weeks later to be with Paige, after she gives birth to her son Gabriel Smith. Lauren is initially angry with Gabriel's father Jack Callahan (Andrew Morley) for letting Paige go off alone to the shack where they conceived Gabriel, but she later apologises to him. Lauren returns to the Gold Coast, along with Paige and Gabriel, upon learning that Amber has appendicitis. She returns to Ramsay Street for a day trip to surprise Paige for Gabe's naming day and encourages Paige to give Jack another chance. Terese later contacts Lauren when Ned turns up in Erinsborough, and Lauren returns to talk to Ned about his feelings for her. After some pushing from Terese, Lauren admits that they shared a romantic moment and she does have some feeling for him, but she is committed to her marriage to Brad. She adds that she will tell Brad everything as soon as she gets back to the Gold Coast, and that Ned deserves happiness. Four years later, Lauren returns for Toadie Rebecchi's (Ryan Moloney) wedding to Melanie Pearson (Lucinda Cowden) and she attends their reception on Ramsay Street afterwards with other residents.

== Reception ==
A writer for the BBC's Neighbours website said Lauren's most notable moment was "Falling under the spell of a religious cult." Josephine Monroe of Inside Soap commented that Lauren's arrival "really set the cat among the pigeons." A Daily Record columnist called her a "troubled teenager". A columnist for SOAP magazine stated "Lauren Carpenter infuriated millions of Neighbours fans when she has a fling with Brad Willis on the eve of his wedding to Beth Brennan." The added that she was a "quirky, horse-loving blonde", who inadvertently disrupted the Willis household.

Sue Malins from Soaplife thought Lauren was involved in some of the "steamiest storylines ever seen on the soap." In February 2013, a Newcastle Herald reporter noted that Lauren had caused "a flurry of gossip with her family's strange behaviour", adding that celebrating the birthday of an absent child "will always raise eyebrows." Melinda Houston from The Sun-Herald called Lauren's heart-to-heart with Lucy a "genuine emotional moment" and added "Kendall does a superb job and sets us up for more drama in 2014." In 2015, a Herald Sun reporter included Lauren discovering the truth about Paige in their "Neighbours' 30 most memorable moments" feature.
