= Mason Turner =

Fictional character from the Australian soap opera Neighbours

- Neighbours character
- Portrayed by: Taylor Glockner
- Duration: 2013–2014
- First appearance: 22 February 2013
- Last appearance: 28 February 2014
- Introduced by: Richard Jasek
- Spin-off appearances: Neighbours vs Zombies (2014)
In-universe information
- Occupation: Mechanic; Waiter; Concierge
- Father: Matt Turner
- Mother: Lauren Carpenter
- Brothers: Bailey Turner
- Sisters: Amber Turner
- Half-sisters: Paige Smith
- Grandfathers: Lou Carpenter
- Grandmothers: Kathy Carpenter

Mason Turner is a fictional character from the Australian soap opera Neighbours, played by Taylor Glockner. The actor previously auditioned for guest roles on the show, but the producers decided to develop a long-term character specifically for him instead. Glockner's character, Mason, was created and introduced along with the Turner family, as part of a major overhaul of the show's cast. Glockner was given a two-year contract with Neighbours and he began filming his first scenes as Mason in November 2012. Glockner made his first screen appearance as Mason during the episode broadcast on 22 February 2013. In December 2013, it was announced that Glockner was to leave Neighbours and Mason departed on 28 February 2014.

The character was introduced two weeks after his parents and two younger siblings. Prior to his on-screen arrival, Mason was serving a three-month sentence for robbery in juvenile detention. He had fallen in with a bad crowd and was led astray by Robbo Slade (Aaron Jakubenko). Executive producer, Richard Jasek, said Mason has a good heart, while Glockner described him as being "smart, funny, serious, angry, caring, playful" and someone who loves his family. Shortly after his arrival, Mason developed a relationship with Kate Ramsay (Ashleigh Brewer). He also became involved in another robbery with Robbo and briefly dated Imogen Willis (Ariel Kaplan).

== Creation and casting ==
On 4 November 2012, it was announced that the five-strong Turner family would be introduced to Neighbours in February 2013. The family were created as part of a major overhaul of the show's cast. Of the Turners, Kate Kendall, who plays matriarch Lauren, explained "The producers were looking to get quite a traditional family in there and hark back to some of those old traditions and family values. They're going to be a really charismatic family, but you'll also get some really juicy storylines and that's what the audiences relate to. Viewers will relate to the familiarity of them and hopefully the sense of magnetism that we bring." The Turners were given an immediate link in Erinsborough through long-term resident Lou Carpenter (Tom Oliver), the father of Lauren and grandfather to Mason and his siblings.

Taylor Glockner was cast as the eldest Turner sibling Mason. Speaking to Daniel Kilkelly from Digital Spy, Glockner explained that he had previously auditioned for a couple of guest roles on the show. The producers decided that they wanted to develop a long-term character specifically for Glockner instead. The actor called the creation of Mason "a very interesting process." Glockner was both "humbled and thrilled" to land the role and called it "a fantastic opportunity" for him as an actor. He told Brooke Hunter from Femail "One of my inspirations, Guy Pearce worked on Neighbours and that was one of my big reasons for auditioning and working hard on the project." Glockner initially had a two-year contract with Neighbours and he began filming his first scenes in November 2012. He shot his first scenes alongside actress Ashleigh Brewer who plays Kate Ramsay. Glockner made his debut screen appearance as Mason on 22 February 2013, two weeks after the rest of his on-screen family began appearing.

== Development ==
=== Backstory ===
In his fictional backstory, Mason was born in June 1999. His birth date was changed to 15 February 1995 upon his introduction. Mason arrived in Erinsborough two weeks after his family due to being in juvenile detention, where he was serving a three-month sentence. Glockner revealed that Mason had fallen in with a bad crowd back in Mount Isa, where his family are from, and was led astray by "troublemaker" Robbo Slade (Aaron Jakubenko). Robbo developed a plan to rob a local warehouse, which Mason went along with – but it went wrong. While Robbo escaped, Mason was caught and the arresting officer was his father Matt (Josef Brown).

=== Characterisation ===
Before his introduction, Kendall described Mason as "the smouldering, rebellious" child. While executive producer, Richard Jasek, commented that Mason is "a bad boy", who has a good heart. He has done the wrong things for the right reasons. Similar to Jasek, Glockner thought that Mason may not have made the best choices in life, but they always came from the right place. Glockner thought that it was "kinda cool" that Mason arrived after his family, saying that it was in his nature to be late to the party. He also said his character was "a good kid" deep down. Describing Mason, the actor stated "He's just lost his way a little bit recently and he's faced the consequences. At the end of the day, he loves his family and would do ANYTHING to protect them. He's smart, funny, serious, angry, caring, playful... and his cheekiness is particularly fun to play." The actor told Kilkelly that he loves Mason's "hard, rebellious edge", saying it was a part of him. He continued "It often works playing Mason with that chiselled element, because it really accentuates his moments of pain and vulnerability."

Glocker also labelled his character "a lost puppy" and "impulsive". The actor stated that despite trying to be a better person, trouble often seemed to follow Mason. Relations between Mason and his father are "pretty icy" to begin with. Mason does not have a lot of time for Matt as he still blamed him for sending him to juvenile detention. Glockner commented that Mason also felt "a lot of frustration and resentment" towards his father, but thought he would overcome it and forgive Matt eventually. Glockner told an Inside Soap columnist that Mason was happy to be free and saw Erinsborough as an unexplored playground. Mason is quick to settle in and when he realises he needs a job, he asks Chris Pappas (James Mason) who works at the local garage. Chris is initially reluctant to take him on, but when Mason helps him out with Ralphie Mahone (Daniel Bowden), Chris then owes him a favour.

=== Relationship with Kate Ramsay ===
Shortly after his arrival, Mason began pursuing Kate Ramsay (Brewer) and although she thought he was too young, there was a spark between them. Glockner said Mason and Kate were a great match and he thought that Kate might be the type of woman to help Mason get his life in order. Mason tries everything to impress Kate, including taking his shirt off in front of her. But when he tries "a more heartfelt approach" by compiling a CD of Kate's sister's music to give to her, it prompts Kate to invite him to Georgia Brooks's (Saskia Hampele) birthday party as her guest. However, just as Kate is starting to change her mind about Mason, his ex-girlfriend, Rhiannon Bates (Teressa Liane), shows up in town. Rhiannon's presence is not welcomed by Mason, but he ends up kissing her to get information about Robbo. Glockner told TV Week's Thomas Mitchell that Mason is prepared to go as far as he needs to, but Kate is the girl he has genuine feelings for. Kate witnesses Mason and Rhiannon's kiss and Mason fears his relationship with her is over before it has begun.

Despite resisting Mason's advances at first, Kate becomes jealous when she sees him with Rhiannon. Brewer admitted that she was not sure her character should be with Mason, especially after she had previously been involved with someone younger. She explained "But it's different, he's very cheeky and it takes its time. Rhiannon turns up and Kate is like 'Why am I getting jealous?' And that's when it starts to unravel that maybe she really does like this guy. But he's really fun and opposites attract there and she just dives in." Kate and Mason begin dating, but soon after, Kate's ex-boyfriend, Mark Brennan (Scott McGregor), returns and asks Kate to come away with him. Kate had assumed Mark was dead, so when she begins spending time with him, Mason feels left out of Kate's life. He is threatened by the history between Kate and Mark and eventually he and Mark fight. Kate is left torn between Mark and Mason, but she eventually commits to a relationship with Mason. However, Mason feels like second best and when he learns Kate kissed Mark, he breaks up with her.

Glockner told an Inside Soap columnist that Mason was "shattered" over his break up with Kate and even though he put on a front, he was struggling inside. Mason tries to get over Kate by dating new neighbour Imogen Willis (Ariel Kaplan). Glockner insisted that Imogen was just a distraction for Mason and even though he thinks she is "a pretty cool girl", it becomes clear that Mason is not over Kate. Imogen quickly realises Mason still has feelings for Kate and she calls time on their brief relationship. Mason decides to forgive Kate for kissing Mark and he tries to reconcile with her. They kiss, but Kate pushes Mason away and flees. Glockner explained "When Kate runs out on him, Mason is confused. At the end of the day he still loves Kate and wants her back." Mason is unaware that Kate recently had a one-night stand with her housemate Kyle Canning (Chris Milligan) and Glockner reckoned that Mason would not take it lightly when he found out, adding that it would interesting to see how he harnesses his "explosive temper."

=== Robbo and Lassiter's robbery ===
Mason's past catches up with him when Robbo Slade arrives in Erinsborough. A writer for Inside Soap observed that Mason was "not too pleased" to see Robbo, considering that he left Mason to take the blame for the robbery they both committed in Mount Isa. Robbo reveals that he has tracked Mason down to get his share of the proceeds from the robbery. Robbo's arrival brings Mason and Matt closer as they realise that they have more important things to worry about and need to work together to protect the family. Since Mason no longer has the money from the Mount Isa robbery, he is forced to come up with another way to pay Robbo back. Mason also learns that Robbo has been secretly dating his younger sister Amber (Jenna Rosenow). Robbo informs Mason that unless he comes up with his share of the money, he will continue to see Amber. Mason's desperation to get Robbo out of town leads him to agree to rob Lassiter's Hotel with him. Mason "listens in horror" as Robbo outlines his plan to rob the hotel while everyone attends Sonya Mitchell (Eve Morey) and Toadfish Rebecchi's (Ryan Moloney) wedding reception.

Mason is aware that his criminal record means that he cannot afford to be caught up in anything illegal, but he believes that he has no choice but to go along with Robbo's plan to protect his family. Mason and Robbo's attempted armed robbery does not go according to plan and they are spotted by Sonya. However, she loses her memory during an explosion, leaving Mason to believe that he is in the clear. But when Sonya's memories return weeks later, Mason is arrested and told that he could go to prison for 15 years if he is convicted. Mason is "heartened" by Kate's forgiveness, but her uncle, Paul Robinson (Stefan Dennis), disapproves of their relationship and asks his lawyer to represent Mason and deliberately damage his case, so he will be sent to jail. Mason is surprised by the offer and Glockner commented "Paul doesn't exactly like Mason, so Mason's taken aback when Paul offers to help." Paul's plan is rumbled by Mason's father, Toadie and Ajay Kapoor (Sachin Joab), who move quickly to stop it.

On 13 May 2013, it was confirmed that Jakubenko had returned to filming, after pictures of him filming with Glockner were released on the show's Facebook page. When Robbo returns, Mason calls the police and tells them that Robbo was responsible for the attempted robbery at Lassiter's. Mason later attempts to deal with Robbo using his fists, but Robbo outsmarts him when he reveals that he has an "illicit video" of Amber that will go viral, unless Mason gives him double the amount of money he owes him. Glockner said that Mason is distressed by the situation and knows that if the video got out, the ramifications would impact on Amber for the rest of her life. Mason becomes so desperate to get hold of the money, he turns to Paul for help, which is "a hard thing" for him to do. He also tries breaking into the old radio station, where Robbo is squatting, to try to find the video and delete it. Glockner thought that Mason would not rest until he had put a stop to Robbo's plan and commented "Mason's a total hothead and often acts before he thinks. But would he do something to Robbo that could have permanent consequences. We'll just have to wait and see..."

=== Departure ===
On 3 December 2013, it was announced that Glockner was to leave Neighbours. The actor stated that since Mason's introduction, he had been "the catalyst for a remarkable amount of storyline" and after a discussion with the producers, they all felt the character should be rested. Glockner continued "I've been involved in so much high-intensity story in such a short space of time – coming up just shy of a thousand scenes in one year!" Glockner told a TV Week reporter that he needed a creative rest, but did not rule out a return to Neighbours. The actor added that he had had "the time of my life." In January 2014, a reporter for news.com.au stated Mason would leave to pursue a new job. Glockner's last scenes as Mason were broadcast on 28 February 2014.

=== Character reflection ===
In 2022, it was announced that Neighbours would be concluding. In an interview with Digital Spy, Glockner explained that when he first heard the news he "wondered if it was just speculation or if they'd got it wrong", but later realised it was a reality and added, "I was very saddened overall, but also very proud of everyone who's worked on the show. How many other shows make it to 37 years? That's an incredible achievement." Glockner also said he would not be surprised if the serial moved to another channel or streaming service or if a spin-off was created in the future. Speaking of his work on the serial, Glockner explained, "I was 21 or 22 when I joined Neighbours. I was very fortunate to become a main character on one of the most successful shows in Australia. When I was working on Neighbours, it was a little bit of a whirlwind for me at the time because I was working so hard. It was 15, 16, 17-hour days, often five or six days a week. But I had a great time and I really learned so much that I'm now applying in everything else that I'm doing." Glockner reflected of his character, I'm so proud of my character arc on the show. Mason came in as a bad boy and he rubbed a lot of people up the wrong way – even viewers! They didn't really like him at the start, because he was causing so many problems for the series regulars." He also explained that Mason left more "lightened up" and liked by viewers. Glockner also said that he would have "certainly have been open to going back" for the finale "if they'd gone with other creatives from my era, but they went with the '80s characters and I think that was the right thing to do." Glockner said that there were a few things he "could have done better" whilst acting as Mason, but praised the soap for giving him the acting experience he currently uses in his own, independent projects.

== Storylines ==
After being released from juvenile detention early, Mason waits a couple of weeks before joining his family in Erinsborough. When he arrives, Mason reassures his mother that he has changed his ways, but tells his father that he will not forgive him for helping to send him to juvie. Mason's brother, Bailey (Calen Mackenzie), admits that he found $10,000 from the robbery, which he was also involved in. When the brothers go to retrieve the money, hidden in a garden gnome, they find it has gone. Mason intervenes when he sees Ralphie Mahone threatening Chris Pappas and begins flirting with Kate Ramsay. He asks her out, but she turns him down due to his age. Lucas Fitzgerald (Scott Major) gives Mason a job at his garage, while Mason's grandfather, Lou, learns that he has been to juvie. Bailey suspects that Mason's accomplice, Robbo Slade, was behind a break in at their house and to prove him wrong, Mason contacts Robbo. He turns up in Erinsborough and asks for his share of the proceeds from the robbery. Mason soon learns that Robbo has been dating Amber and playing the family off against each other. Realising that he needs to get rid of Robbo quickly, Mason takes a waitering job at Lassiter's Hotel to earn more money.

In order to square his debt with Robbo, Mason agrees to take part in a robbery at Lassiter's. However, on the day, extra security staff laid on for Sonya and Toadie's wedding prevent Mason and Robbo from carrying out the robbery. While Robbo is berating Mason, they are spotted by Sonya and Robbo leaves. Shortly after an explosion causes Sonya to hit her head and lose her memory. Bailey spots the missing gnome in Sheila Canning's (Colette Mann) garden and he and Mason try to get it back. They tell Sheila the money belongs to Lou and she gives it to him. When he learns where it came from, he donates it to charity. The truth about the Mount Isa robbery comes out and it brings Matt and Mason closer. Mason's ex-girlfriend, Rhiannon Bates, arrives in town and he uses her to get information about Robbo. Realising that Rhiannon's presence is stopping him from winning over Kate, Mason tells her that does not want to be with her. Kate's uncle, Paul Robinson, learns about Mason's criminal record and attempts to blackmail him into leaving her alone. However, Mason is honest with Kate and they start dating. Sonya regains her memory, leading Mason to be arrested and charged with armed robbery. Kate breaks up with him, but Mason gets her to change her mind.

Paul disapproves of Mason dating Kate, but offers Mason his lawyer's services. Kate's ex-boyfriend, Mark Brennan, returns and Mason is jealous when she spends time with him. Mason finds out Mark has a girlfriend in Sydney and they fight. When Kate tells Mason that she chose him, he believe that he is second best and breaks up with her. Mason changes lawyers at the last minute and is given a three-year good behaviour bond. Mason briefly dates Imogen Willis, but she breaks up with him when she realises he still loves Kate. Mason asks Kate if they can get back together and she tells him that she had a one-night stand with Mark. Mason assures her that he can get past it and they reunite. Mason and Imogen become co-owners of a car and Mason gets a job as a concierge at Lassiter's. Robbo returns to Erinsborough and Mason tips off the police. After making bail, Robbo comes to see Mason and they fight. Mason supports Kate when she tells him that she is infertile, but he is disappointed when he learns her housemates knew first. Robbo blackmails Mason for $10,000, threatening to release footage of himself and Amber having sex onto the internet. After failing to raise enough money, Mason asks Paul for a loan, but Paul insists on handling things his way.

Robbo steps up his threat, causing Mason to ask Chris, Joshua Willis (Harley Bonner) and Hudson Walsh (Remy Hii) for help. Hudson gets the money and the others are giving it to Robbo, Mason breaks into Robbo's squat and takes his laptop. That same night, Robbo is involved in a hit-and-run and he later dies in hospital. Imogen tells Mason that Amber took their car and when he finds it, he realises that it may have been involved in Robbo's accident. Mason fixes the damage to the car and dumps it near the hospital. Mason is questioned by the police and later asks Kate to give him a false alibi. Mason and Paul confront Marty Kranic (Darius Perkins), believing he is responsible for Robbo's death. Marty denies being involved and threatens Paul. When Mason suggests to Kate that they try for a baby, she realises that they both want different things and breaks up with him. Mason figures out the password to Robbo's laptop and is relieved to find the footage of Amber was not uploaded to the internet. He also discovers that Lauren emailed Robbo on the night of the accident. Hudson later confesses to running Robbo down. Matt learns Mason went to Paul for help, rather than him, causing another rift between them. They eventually sort their issues out.

Mason tries to win back Kate, but she turns him down. Mason and Imogen then grow closer when they bond over their various problems. Rhiannon returns, bringing her son, Jackson (Finn Woodlock), with her. Mason makes it clear to Rhiannon that he is not ready for a relationship, so she suggests they keep things casual. Rhiannon begins working alongside Mason at Lassiter's Hotel and he becomes a father figure to Jackson. When Rhiannon makes plans for them to live together, Mason realises that he is not ready for that kind of commitment and breaks up with Rhiannon. Mason learns Kate and Kyle had a one-night stand, and that Kate lied about Mark. After confronting Kate, Mason realises that he is not hurt and is ready to move on. He then realises that he has feelings for Imogen and is jealous when she begins dating Isaac Woods (Josh Burton). Mason tells Imogen that he has feelings for her and tries to appear more intelligent to impress her. When he sees Isaac sneaking into an unoccupied Number 24, Mason reports him to the police and Isaac is arrested. Mason accompanies Imogen, Josh and Amber on a camping trip. He and Imogen go abseiling and Josh decides to give it ago, after Mason taunts him. Josh falls and seriously injures his shoulder, ending his professional swimming career. His father, Brad (Kip Gamblin), blames Mason, but Imogen supports him and they begin dating in secret. When Brad sues Mason for damages, Mason enlists Mark's help to clear his name and they find a broken carabiner at the site of the accident, which the hire company accept as theirs. Brad drops the case against Mason and Josh forgives him. Imogen breaks up with Mason on his birthday because she does not feel he is the one. Mason informs his family that he is taking a job in Darwin as he needs a fresh start. Lauren is reluctant for Mason to leave, but after Lou convinces her to support Mason, she gives her blessing for him to go. Mason leaves for Darwin after bidding farewell to his family.

== Other appearances ==
In October 2014, it was announced that Glockner had reprised his role for the five-part webisode series Neighbours vs Zombies. The storyline sees Mason teaming up with Hope Gottlieb (Louna Maroun) in an attempt to stop a zombie invasion.

== Reception ==
Of Mason's first appearance, Dianne Butler from The Daily Telegraph commented "And now boy Mason Turner's arrived, fresh out of juvie, and already he's hooking people up with 'storm-damaged' cars from 'Queensland'. Sure, we're all for rehabilitation, but there is a limit." A reporter for the Daily Post also commented on Mason arrival, saying "Fresh out of juvenile detention, Mason turns up in Ramsay Street with a chip on his shoulder. He hasn't forgiven Matt for shopping him to the cops. Little wonder there's tension between father and son at a belated Turner family dinner to celebrate Mason's 18th birthday." A writer for the Sunday Mail called Mason the "resident bad boy".

Their colleague noted that Rhiannon's arrival halted Mason's attempts to get closer to Kate and said "How is he going to manage to up his game and show Kate that he's the one for her when his ex is lingering? Kissing her probably won't help, either." A writer for the same paper wrote that Mason was not "having a good time" when he ended up on the wrong side of the law again. Another reporter thought "Mason's romantic life is also on the up, as he takes Imogen out on a date and the two seem to hit it off." Peter Dyke and Katie Begley from the Daily Star cited Mason as one of the reasons extra female viewers were tuning into Neighbours. A TV Week columnist branded Imogen and Mason "a modern-day Romeo and Juliet."
