= Bailey Turner =

Fictional character from the Australian soap opera Neighbours

- Neighbours character
- Portrayed by: Calen Mackenzie
- Duration: 2013–2015
- First appearance: 7 February 2013
- Last appearance: 1 May 2015
- Introduced by: Richard Jasek
- Spin-off appearances: Neighbours vs Zombies (2014)
In-universe information
- Occupation: Student; Waiter
- Father: Matt Turner
- Mother: Lauren Carpenter
- Brothers: Mason Turner
- Sisters: Amber Turner
- Half-sisters: Paige Smith
- Grandfathers: Lou Carpenter
- Grandmothers: Kathy Carpenter
- Uncles: Guy Carpenter

Bailey Turner is a fictional character from the Australian soap opera Neighbours played by Calen Mackenzie. The actor has previously appeared in the show as Thomas McPhee in 2011. Mackenzie auditioned for the role of Bailey and a week after attending a second call back, he learned that he had been cast in the show. Mackenzie commented that getting the part of Bailey was "amazing" and he considered Neighbours his big break within the acting industry. He was initially contracted for four years. The character was created and introduced to Neighbours along with his family, as part of a major overhaul of the show's cast. He made his first screen appearance during the episode broadcast on 7 February 2013.

Bailey is the youngest member of the Turner family. He is portrayed as inquisitive and a nerd. He enjoys applying himself academically. Mackenzie described Bailey as being the glue of the family and someone who keeps a straight head. The actor revealed that he shares some similarities with Bailey. Shortly after his arrival, it emerged that Bailey had played a part in a robbery that saw his brother, Mason (Taylor Glockner), sent to juvenile detention, something their mother knew nothing about. Mackenzie enjoyed the storyline, calling it one of his favourites. Bailey became involved in a love triangle with his best friend, Callum (Morgan Baker), and Rani Kapoor (Coco Cherian), that ended in him almost losing his life. Towards the end of 2013, Bailey found himself being manipulated by his teacher Gem Reeves (Kathryn Beck).

== Creation and casting ==
On 4 November 2012, it was announced that the five-strong Turner family would be introduced to Neighbours in February 2013. The family were created as part of a major overhaul of the show's cast. Of the Turners, Kate Kendall, who plays matriarch Lauren, explained "The producers were looking to get quite a traditional family in there and hark back to some of those old traditions and family values. They're going to be a really charismatic family, but you'll also get some really juicy storylines and that's what the audiences relate to. Viewers will relate to the familiarity of them and hopefully the sense of magnetism that we bring." The Turners were given an immediate link in Erinsborough through long-term resident Lou Carpenter (Tom Oliver), the father of Lauren and grandfather to Bailey and his siblings.

Calen Mackenzie was cast as Bailey, the youngest member of the Turner family. Mackenzie had previously appeared in Neighbours as Thomas McPhee in 2011. Mackenzie went through an audition process and received a second call back, which made him start to believe that he might get the role. A week later, he learned that he had won the role of Bailey. Mackenzie was initially contracted for four years. When asked how he felt about joining the soap, Mackenzie said "I've done quite a few roles on new shows, but to be a part of something which has been going since before you were born and such a huge part of this collective consciousness is really amazing." The actor also felt that Neighbours was his big break within the acting industry. Mackenzie made his first appearance as Bailey on 7 February 2013.

== Development ==
=== Characterisation ===
Bailey is the youngest child of Lauren and Matt Turner (Josef Brown). Before his on-screen introduction, Kendall described Bailey as being "a brain". A writer for the show's official website stated "Cheeky, left-of-centre and inquisitive, Bailey Turner is one switched on teen. A self described nerd, Bailey loves flexing his brain muscles and has a unique take on everything." Bailey enjoys applying himself academically and he loves astronomy and physiology. Mackenzie called Bailey "the glue" of the Turner family, explaining "If Dad or Mason can't fix it, Bailey will always try. He is the one who keeps a straight head in the family." He stated that Bailey gets on well with his siblings Amber (Jenna Rosenow) and Mason (Taylor Glockner), but there is a competitive spirit amongst them and sometimes they wind each other up. Bailey loves his parents equally and always wants the best for them.

Mackenzie told Daniel Kilkelly from Digital Spy that he does share some similarities with Bailey, which include reading comics and playing video games. He added that he would like Bailey's rebellious side to come out more and for him to become less sensible as he develops. Bailey befriends Callum Jones (Morgan Baker) shortly after moving into Ramsay Street. Daniel Kilkelly from Digital Spy commented that the friendship had had "lots of ups and downs" and Mackenzie agreed, saying "It's constantly up and down. They have periods of being good friends, but then something will always go wrong – it's always a rollercoaster!" Off-screen, Mackenzie became friends with Baker and admitted that they often laugh during filming, particularly if Bailey and Callum have had a falling-out.

=== Mount Isa robbery ===
The Turner family were introduced with the promise that they would be hiding secrets. Eldest son Mason did not arrive with the family and shortly after moving into Number 32, the house was burgled. Bailey becomes "a mess" upon realising that someone entered the house. Later that night, he retrieves a large amount of money and hides it in a garden gnome, before "vigilantly keeping a nervous watch over his family throughout the night." When Mason eventually arrives in town, it is revealed that he has been in juvenile detention for his part in a robbery that took place in Mount Isa. Bailey reassures him that he is keeping the proceeds of the crime safe. A Soap World columnist explained that Bailey has known all the details of the robbery for "some time" and is soon assuring his brother that he has been keeping the proceeds safe.

When Bailey and Mason go to get the money, they find the garden gnome has disappeared. They later learn that the money is in the possession of their neighbour, Sheila Canning (Colette Mann), who eventually gives it back to them. When Mason is later arrested for another armed robbery, the Turner family is thrown "into chaos" and "a heartsick" Bailey confesses that he was also involved in the Mount Isa robbery, which in turn forces Matt to admit to Lauren that he covered up for Bailey. Both Bailey and Matt decide to tell the police about their involvement in the robbery and they face prosecution. Mackenzie commented that he "thoroughly enjoyed" his family's storylines upon their arrival, particularly the aftermath of the Mount Isa robbery.

=== Love triangle ===
Upon moving into Ramsay Street, Bailey immediately noticed Rani Kapoor (Coco Cherian) and developed a crush on her. However, he was warned off pursuing her by his friend Callum, who had wanted Rani to be his girlfriend for a while. Mackenzie commented that while it was hard for Bailey to back off, as he really liked Rani, he did not want to break the code by stealing his friend's potential girlfriend. Mackenzie said it was important to Bailey, but it was not easy as he could not switch his feelings for Rani off. Rani becomes torn between the two boys and eventually shares a kiss with Bailey while they are rehearsing for a school play. Callum is devastated when he finds out about the kiss and stops talking to Bailey, he also asks Rani to do the same. Things come to a head when Callum confronts Bailey, which results in a fight that leaves Bailey in a serious condition. Baker told an Inside Soap columnist that Callum feels let down by Bailey and Rani. Following Callum's ultimatum to Rani, he "tries desperately" to ignore the tension between her and Bailey. However, it gets too much for him when he sees them talking. Mackenzie said "Bailey is cleaning the pool when Rani comes to see him. Callum sees them talking and assumes the worst."

Callum makes "a pretty off comment" comparing Rani to her mother, who had an affair, which leads to Bailey lunging at Callum. During the confrontation, Bailey and Callum begin shoving each other, which results in Bailey hitting his head, losing consciousness and falling into the pool. As Bailey sinks to the bottom of the pool, Rani manages to snap Callum into action and he pulls Bailey out. Local doctor Karl Kennedy (Alan Fletcher) resuscitates Bailey. Mackenzie commented that his character is in bad shape when he is rushed to hospital. Karl reveals that Bailey has inhaled enough water that could lead to secondary drowning. Baker said Callum feels bad about what happened and he hoped his character would forgive Bailey in the future. Mackenzie said the storyline was a challenge for him, as it was all about the emotion. Bailey and Rani begin dating, but their relationship ends when Rani has to leave Erinsborough. Mackenzie hoped Bailey would get another love interest in the future, as he thought Bailey was "a sweet kid", who had not had much luck. The actor said it would be good for Bailey to find a nice girl who would not mess him around.

=== Gemma Reeves ===
Bailey struggles following the end of his relationship with Rani, which leaves him vulnerable to manipulation by his teacher Gemma Reeves (Kathryn Beck). Mackenzie believed that Bailey had "all this love" and no one to give it to, which Gem uses to take advantage of him and cause Bailey to fall in love with her. Mackenzie said that Gem makes Bailey believe that they could be more than just friends, saying it was not "your usual teacher/student dynamic." The actor explained that the storyline was a big one for his character, saying "after being on the show for a year, this is the storyline I've tackled which has had the most substance. It's the heaviest one we've done for Bailey so far." When Bailey catches Gem rigging the school captain vote, he guilts her into replacing the stolen votes. However, he is not prepared for Gem's "sinister" comeback when she propositions him into not reporting her to the principal, Susan Kennedy (Jackie Woodburne).

Continuing her manipulation of Bailey, Gem encourages his crush on her and champions his place on a school trip to China. When she is hospitalised, Gem uses Bailey's concern for her to her advantage. She later tells Bailey that she is withdrawing her support for his place on the China trip, as she cannot bear to be without him for so long. Bailey then becomes "smitten" with Gem and she realises that she can use his naivety to get him to achieve her own needs. Gem also starts to enjoy Bailey's attention and they develop "a firm friendship", which results in Imogen Willis (Ariel Kaplan) catching them holding hands at Lassiter's Lake. Imogen reports what she saw to Susan, which causes Gem to threaten her. Bailey eventually sees Gem's nasty side when the other people she has tried to manipulate turn against her. Mackenzie stated "As much as Bailey is hurt and distraught that Gem has turned on him, he still really cares about her and wants to be there for her. I think you'll see that Bailey is prepared to forgive her." The actor added that Beck was great to work with during the storyline.

Wanting answers for why Gem got him to hack into Kate Ramsay's (Ashleigh Brewer) email account, Bailey convinces Callum to break into her room. There they find Gem's diary, which they read and discover her "darkest thoughts and secrets." Despite this, Bailey decides to meet with Gem, against Callum's objections. Bailey sends Gem a text and after she agrees to meet him at the local garden nursery, he sneaks out. At the same time, Matt and Lauren discover his absence and rush to find him. When they get to the nursery, Gem begins to panic and "events unravel". Mackenzie commented "Gem is a loose cannon. She has a dangerous side. The more she's backed into a corner, this side comes out."

=== Teenage alcoholism ===
Producers used Bailey to explore the issues of teenage alcoholism in May 2014. After being bullied at school, Bailey turned to alcohol to cope with the situation. Mackenzie explained that Bailey is targeted by school bully Jayden Warley (Khan Oxenham) and through their encounters, Bailey began drinking with him. Eventually Jayden pushed Bailey too far. Mackenzie said Bailey was having "a tough time" and the drinking was his way of escaping everything. He added "It's very dark. He hides his drinking from everyone and it spirals out of control." Mackenzie was happy to receive the serious and emotional storyline for his character. He thought it was quite an unexpected thing for Bailey to do, but realised that it could happen to people who are pushed too far. Mackenzie researched the issues of teenage alcoholism by speaking to friends, who had been through similar issues. The actor found the scenes where he had to pretend to be drunk a challenge. He explained "When you are under the influence of alcohol, you are trying to appear normal and look not drunk, so that was a strange one – pretending to be drunk while pretending not to be drunk!" As the storyline progressed, Bailey befriended Ben Kirk (Felix Mallard), who helped show Bailey a new side to himself.

=== Grief and rebellion ===
After Matt died as a result of injuries he suffered in a hit-and-run, Bailey tried to put on "a stoic façade" and helped plan his father's funeral. The family went to Mount Isa to spread Matt's ashes and Lauren hoped it would be "emotionally cathartic" for Bailey, but upon their return to Erinsborough Bailey became withdrawn. Amber's partner Daniel (Tim Phillipps) tried to help him, but Bailey attacked Daniel, saying he was not part of the family. Bailey then went to Matt's memorial site, where in his grief he trashed the memorial. Lauren noticed Bailey's suspicious behaviour and he told her that he missed his father and could not "make sense of the tragedy." Bailey later turned to alcohol to cope with his grief and began hanging out with Jayden again. Bailey became enraged and a fight broke out between him and Jayden, which was witnessed by Susan. Lauren then asked Brad Willis (Kip Gamblin) to speak with Bailey, but "he throws Brad's advice in his face" by telling him that Brad will never replace his father. When Bailey learned that Matt had become corrupt in his last weeks, he got drunk again and used his father's badge to impersonate a police officer. After a failed intervention, Bailey criticises his family and then steals a car.

=== Departure ===
On 27 February 2015, Kilkelly reported Mackenzie had left Neighbours after two years with the show. While an official announcement was not made, Mackenzie's acting school Brave Studios confirmed the news. A Neighbours spokesperson said "To ensure our loyal fans experience the full impact of our storylines, we are not confirming the contractual arrangements of current and guest cast." Bailey departed on 1 May 2015, after Lou took him to live with his grandmother Kathy (Tina Bursill) in Queensland, following a period of rebellion caused by his grief for Matt's death.

== Storylines ==
Bailey moves to Erinsborough with his family and he befriends Rani Kapoor and Callum Jones. Callum warns Bailey away from Rani, as he does not want to compete for her affections. After someone breaks into Number 32, Bailey hides a large sum of money in a garden gnome and keeps guard with a cricket bat through the night. When his brother, Mason, arrives, Bailey tells him that he believes Robbo Slade (Aaron Jakubenko) was behind the break-in. Bailey then explains that following the warehouse robbery involving Mason and Robbo, he found some money in the back of their mother's car and thinks Robbo has come for it. It also emerges that Bailey was caught up in the robbery when he tried to stop Mason, but their father protected him. Bailey and Mason discover the gnome has gone, but they later find it in Sheila Canning's garden and get the money back. After Mason is arrested for another armed robbery, Bailey decides to tell the police about his part in the Mount Isa robbery and he is given a caution.

Rani casts Bailey in the lead role of her play. Bailey develops feelings for Rani and they share a kiss. When Callum finds out, he fights with Bailey. Rani reluctantly agrees to stop being friends with Bailey. When Callum catches Rani and Bailey talking, he starts another fight. Callum pushes Bailey, who trips and hits his head, before falling into the pool. Callum pulls Bailey out and Karl Kennedy resuscitates him. Callum repairs his friendship with Bailey and Rani by arranging a date for them. Rani and Bailey's relationship ends when Rani leaves for England. A depressed Bailey allows himself to be manipulated by his teacher, Gem. Gem convinces Bailey to hack into Kate Ramsay's (Ashleigh Brewer) email account, where they find an unsent email detailing her one-night stand with Kyle Canning (Chris Milligan). Gem uses the email to end her cousin, Georgia Brooks' (Saskia Hampele) engagement to Kyle. When Bailey realises that he is culpable in Gem's revenge, he exposes her. Bailey later arranges a meeting and suggests Gem talks to the police. Gem gets angry and leaves.

Bailey helps Josie Mackay (Kate Mylius) out with an assignment and they begin dating. When Bailey learns that he has a half-sister that was adopted, he tries to find her. Bailey finds Lisa Tucker (Millie Samuels), who fits the criteria for Lauren's daughter, but a blood test shows she is not related to Lauren. When Jayden Warley (Khan Oxenham) challenges Bailey to a fight, Bailey gives him alcohol to get him to change his mind. Jayden later invites Bailey to hang out with him and Bailey gets drunk. Josie breaks up with Bailey and he continues to drink with Jayden and his friends. Josh Willis (Harley Bonner) advises Bailey to stop drinking and helps him hide the fact that he has stolen half of Lou's homemade alcoholic ginger beer. Jayden begins bullying Bailey at school. Paige Novak (Olympia Valance) also realises Bailey has a problem with alcohol and covers for him when he steals from the till at Harold's Store. When Matt and Lauren learn of Bailey's drinking problem, they get Sonya Mitchell (Eve Morey) to counsel him.

Paige is revealed to be Lauren's daughter and Bailey is the most accepting of her half-siblings. Bailey applies to space camp and sets up an astronomy club, where he meets his rival Alice Azikiwe (Vivienne Awosoga). Alice and Bailey's rivalry eventually develops into a relationship. Bailey decides to pull out of the interview for space camp for Alice, but she talks him out of it. Alice gets into space camp and their relationship ends when she leaves for the United States. Bailey, Amber and Paige learn that they, along with Mason, own Number 32. Matt and Lauren buy the house from them as they do not want to be their children's tenants. Shortly after, they discover the money for the house has been stolen and Bailey admits that it may be his fault, as he was talking to a Russian girl on the internet and may have downloaded some keylogging software, allowing her to steal the money. Matt blames Bailey for the family's financial problems and Bailey is tempted to drink again. Lauren later finds a bottle of wine in Bailey's bag.

Paige encourages Bailey to join Brad Willis' (Kip Gamblin) training session for an upcoming fun-run. Bailey pushes himself too hard and collapses. He recovers and Matt helps him train. Matt dies after being involved in a hit-and-run and Bailey struggles to cope. He lashes out at Daniel Robinson (Tim Phillipps) and then trashes Matt's memorial. Bailey begins drinking again and he lashes out at Jayden and Brad, accusing the latter of trying to take his father's place. After spending the day drinking with Jayden and impersonating a police officer, Bailey lashes out when Lou confronts him, shoving him into the kitchen counter. Lauren later has him charged with impersonating a police officer. Lauren, Paige, Amber and Sonya hold an intervention, but Bailey refuses to listen to them. He later steals a car from the garage. Bailey tells Lou that he wants to get away from the sadness in the house, and he agrees to move to Brisbane with Lou.

== Reception ==
Digital Spy's Daniel Kilkelly thought Bailey made "a confident" entrance to Neighbours. TV Week writer Andrew Mercado was not impressed with Bailey's near drowning, commenting that similar stories had been done in 2011 and 2008. He added "Seriously, no-one should swim in Erinsborough unless there's a lifeguard on duty." During the Gem storyline, another TV Week reporter said that "an uneasy chemistry" had developed between the pair and called Bailey a "smitten schoolboy". When Bailey noticed Josie, Tony Stewart, writing for the Daily Record, quipped "Poor Bailey gets entangled in a teenage crush." Stewart observed "Bailey's bubble is shortlived and then burst when Callum insists that it's him who she really fancies and that Josie is just using poor Bailey." A reporter for The Age called Bailey and Alice's romance "one of the more satisfying relationships" in the show. In 2014, Bailey's space camp ambitions storyline won the Soap Extra Award for Most Out-of-This-World Storyline.
