= Glöckner =

Glöckner, Glockner is a German surname, which means 'bell-ringer'. Notable people with the surname include:

- Andreas Glockner (born 1988), German footballer
- Taylor Glockner
- Angelika Glöckner (born 1962), German politician
- Gottfried Glöckner
- Hermann Glöckner (1889–1987), German painter and sculptor
- Manfred Glöckner (1936–2005), East German slalom canoeist
- Michael Glöckner (born 1969), German cyclist
- Patrick Glöckner
- Rudi Glöckner (1929–1999), German football referee

== See also ==
- Helga Glöckner-Neubert
- Gloeckner
