= Kate Ramsay =

Fictional character from Neighbours

- Neighbours character
- Portrayed by: Ashleigh Brewer
- Duration: 2009–2014
- First appearance: 15 May 2009
- Last appearance: 8 April 2014
- Introduced by: Susan Bower
In-universe information
- Occupation: Waitress; Student; Bar manager; Teacher
- Family: Ramsay
- Father: Patrick Mooney
- Mother: Jill Ramsay
- Brothers: Harry Ramsay
- Sisters: Sophie Ramsay
- Grandfathers: Max Ramsay
- Grandmothers: Anne Robinson
- Uncles: Paul Robinson
- Aunts: Lucy Robinson
- First cousins: Elle Robinson; Andrew Robinson

Kate Ramsay is a fictional character from the Australian soap opera Neighbours, played by Ashleigh Brewer. The actress successfully auditioned for the role and relocated to Melbourne for filming. She made her first screen appearance during the episode broadcast on 15 May 2009. Kate was introduced along with her siblings Harry (Will Moore) and Sophie (Kaiya Jones) as a new generation of the Ramsay family. Her storylines have included dealing with the death of her mother, becoming the legal guardian of her siblings, her relationships with Declan Napier (James Sorensen) and Mark Brennan (Scott McGregor) and kissing a student. For her portrayal of Kate, Brewer earned a nomination for Most Popular New Female Talent at the 2010 Logie Awards. In November 2013, it was announced Brewer had quit Neighbours and Kate was killed off during the episode broadcast on 8 April 2014.

== Creation and casting ==
In February 2009, a reporter for Channel 5 announced Neighbours were introducing a new generation of the Ramsay family to the show. The Ramsays had not appeared regularly in Neighbours since 2001. Executive producer Susan Bower said the introduction of the new Ramsay family members was based on the American drama series Party of Five. Bower explained "We have three orphans, basically. That, as you can imagine, has a tremendous amount of story material with it and they're fabulous! Wait until you see this cast. They just clicked". Bower introduced the new characters despite the show receiving criticism because they did not have a nuclear or "normal" family.

Brisbane actress Ashleigh Brewer arrived in Melbourne the week after graduating from her school to scout around casting agents and look for acting work. While she was in the city, Brewer successfully auditioned for an ongoing role in Neighbours as Kate Ramsay, the eldest member of the new Ramsay family. Brewer told the official Neighbours website getting the part of Kate was "beyond any expectations" and a dream come true. The actress relocated to Melbourne for filming and she made her debut as Kate on 15 May 2009. Brewer's on screen siblings, Harry (Will Moore) and Sophie (Kaiya Jones) followed shortly after. Of her character, Brewer said "I almost feel like viewers know Kate already because of the Ramsay history which makes playing her even more exciting." In December 2011, a reporter from the Herald Sun reported Brewer had signed a new contract to stay with Neighbours until March 2013. On 19 July 2013, Brewer celebrated filming 1000 episodes.

== Development ==
=== Characterisation ===
"As the eldest, Kate is a natural leader. After the death of their beloved mother, Jill Ramsay, she had to look after her younger siblings Harry and Sophie and quickly became the responsible adult in the family."

— Network Ten on Kate

Kate's early scenes saw her dealing with her mother, Jill's (Perri Cummings), death in a car accident. Brewer told Jason Herbison of Inside Soap that following Jill's death Kate was "extremely distressed, upset and confused", making it hard for her to care for her younger siblings. Kate was also faced with having people interfere with her life, which was difficult as she had trust issues. Brewer admitted the storyline was challenging due to the emotion required. Due to caring for her siblings, Kate develops a "maturity beyond her years" and she often put the needs of others before her own. The official Neighbours website describes Kate as "mature, independent and trustworthy", she is also a proud woman and very protective of her family. After moving into Ramsay Street, Kate began to bond with the other teenagers. Following the death of Bridget Parker (Eloise Mignon), the bonds tightened between Kate, Declan Napier (James Sorensen) and Donna Freedman (Margot Robbie). Donna often turned to Kate for help with her fashion business.

Channel 5's Holy Soap website said Kate has a natural talent for dancing. She gave up her hobby a couple of years before her mother died, but after encouragement from her brother, she began dancing again. Kate was later involved in a storyline, which saw her dance for Jason Coleman at his Ministry of Dance. She has also been tasked with organising the Deb Ball, which she decided to make environmentally friendly. This caused her to clash with Amanda Fowler (Bella Heathcote), her enemy in and out of school. Kate has been called too serious by her younger sister and has been advised to "stop carrying the weight of the world on her shoulders" and have some fun with her life. When she was asked how Kate has changed as a character, Brewer told Channel 5 "She is still very responsible and I think she'll always be like that. She is definitely more confident and doesn't shy aware from standing up for herself to family members or her friends." Brewer opined Kate does have a sense of fun, despite going through so much in her life.

=== Relationship with Declan Napier ===
In late 2009, the character became the centre of disapproval from viewers, who felt fellow character Declan Napier (James Sorensen) was moving on too fast after his wife's death when he developed feelings for Kate. Sorensen then backed the storyline, insisting the storyline with Kate was a good thing, stating: "It's a difficult situation. Declan was truly in love with Bridget. He was one of the lucky ones to have found his soulmate early in life, but at the same time, he has to move on and live his life." further adding: "A lot of people do think it's too soon for another relationship. But I can assure you that it's done very tastefully." He then added an explanation for how Kate directly affected his character, adding: "He feels as though he's cheated on Bridget and that he hasn't mourned for long enough to be able to move on without showing proper respect to the love of his life. He's left confused and upset". As scenes from the storyline began to air Brewer defended her character and made comment on the storyline, reassuring viewers adding: "I think they'll be okay with it... I think they'll be accepting. It's done very tastefully and very slowly. The two characters don't rush anything".

Kate was then portrayed as troubled after Declan felt he could not forget Bridget (Eloise Mignon), putting their romance in jeopardy. Of this Sorensen praised his and Brewer's storyline, explaining "I'm glad that, some months down the track, all wasn't forgotten. It's such a sad situation. Declan really does like Kate and she feels the same way about him. But his heart won't let him move on". After the couple began dating it attracted a bigger mixed response from viewers, many felt it was still too soon after Bridget. Some viewers still refused to accept Kate's new romance, prompting Sorenson to defend Kate and Declan for a final time. The storyline then carried on progressing and viewers saw the two characters grow closer until they started a relationship, despite the mixed response received from fans of Declan and Bridget.

In August 2010, Declan and Kate's relationship ended when Kate chose to break up with him after he began pushing her away. Declan starts a new job and he later lies to his family in front of her. Erin Mullally (who took over the role of Declan in May 2010) said "Declan's been pushing Kate away, he has so much going on in his life. He's holding on to these massive pieces of information that he feels he can't share with anyone – not even Kate." When Kate sees Declan lying to his mother, she believes that he is not the boy she fell for and does not know if she can trust him. Mullally said that Declan is not prepared for the moment Kate breaks up with him and he is confused. Declan goes to Ringo Brown's (Sam Clark) bucks night where he meets Kate's rival, Candace (Sheona Urquhart), who makes it clear that she is attracted to him. Declan and Candace later share a kiss, which Kate sees. Mullally said "Candace gets talking to Declan and is there for him, he wants comfort and makes that split-second decision to kiss her. He doesn't think about the consequences". Declan does not know Kate saw them together and Mullally added that he hoped they could move on as they "really do work as a couple".

=== Relationship with Mark Brennan ===
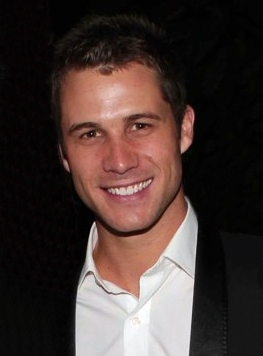
Scott McGregor played Kate's second love interest, Mark Brennan.

In November 2010, Brewer revealed that Kate was to find a new romance with an existing character. Brewer said "Declan and Kate are pretty much dead and gone. There's a new relationship in the works that you're about to see, which is really fun and exciting". She also branded the new relationship a "refreshing change for Kate", stating that she is usually the person doing the looking after and she needs to be with someone who can look after her. Jackie Brygel from TV Week revealed that Kate's new love interest would be Mark Brennan (Scott McGregor). When he asks Kate out, she initially turns him down. However, when he rescues her from lawyers Toadfish Rebecchi (Ryan Moloney) and Samantha Fitzgerald (Simone Buchanan), she changes her mind. Brewer thought that Kate was ready to move on from Declan, even though Kate herself does not want to. Brewer quipped that it was about time Kate had a new man. During the date with Mark, Declan appears and Kate is furious to think he still has a hold on her life. Kate's new romance enabled her to let go of her responsibilities a little and Brewer was happy with the development, saying "She's really happy in this new relationship and the audience is going to see a new side to Kate. She lets go a bit and starts acting a bit younger, which I was really hoping for!".

Kate and Mark's romance moves into "top gear" when they share a kiss in front of Mark's colleagues outside the police station. Brewer said that it had taken Kate a "little while" to realise that she wanted to make things work with Mark because of the unfinished business with Declan. However, all of Kate's feelings for Declan had gone after becoming aware of the negativity surrounding him. Declan tries to cause problems for Kate by lying about Mark threatening and hurting him, which she initially believes. Kate then has to work to get Mark back. Brewer believed the Kate and Mark's relationship would be long-term and she admitted that she wanted to see where it goes. Kate and Mark break up after Kate confesses to lying in a police statement. Brewer thought that they both want to get back together, but they are not able to move on from the things that are keeping them apart. She explained that they both have history, like the lie Kate told to protect Rebecca and Mark's one-night stand, which hurt Kate, and this prevents them from moving forward. The actress believed Mark was "the one" for Kate and added "She is trying to deal with the break-up and I don't think in her mind or his that they truly believe this is forever. They just need a bit of time to sort out their issues".

McGregor announced his departure from Neighbours in February 2011. Mark's exit storyline saw him leave for witness protection, after he is stalked. Mark does not want to leave Kate behind and tries to convince her to pack up her life and go with him. Kate then has just thirty minutes to make up her mind. Brewer told a Channel 5 reporter that Kate decides to go with her instincts and chooses to go with Mark. Of her choice, Brewer said "Kate makes decisions very quickly. She didn't have time to think about the consequences; that was just something she would have to deal with at a later date". When asked what the deciding factor is for Kate, Brewer explained that it felt right to her and she knows how much she loves Mark. Kate has to convince Sophie to leave with her and Brewer thought it was not fair of Kate to expect her sister to make such a huge decision so quickly. The episode unfolded in real time and was filmed over two nights. Brewer said the biggest challenge during filming was the bad weather during the night shoot. The actress admitted that it was "incredibly stressful and exhausting, but the final result was worth it." Kate does not leave with Mark and she struggles with knowing that he is gone for good.

In November 2012, it was announced that McGregor would be returning as Mark in May 2013. Executive producer Richard Jasek stated that Mark would return during an eclipse and Kate would be left questioning whether she had really seen him. In April 2013, Brewer revealed that Mark's return scenes had to be filmed within one week because McGregor was only in the country for a brief time. Brewer told a Press Association reporter that Kate would be "torn" when Mark returns. She had believed that he had died while he was in witness protection and Brewer admitted that she was also surprised to learn Mark was coming back. She said "So Kate had cried her eyes out for months, and then I had this meeting and they said 'We're bringing him back.' and I was like 'So that was all for nothing?!'" The actress added that her character would have to make a decision as she had finally moved on with somebody else.

=== One-night stand ===
Kate has a one-night stand with Rhys Lawson (Ben Barber) in July 2011. Brewer told Inside Soap Kate is lonely and missing Mark, so she wants to do something to get out of the low place she is in. Kate meets Rhys at Charlie's bar and following a "big night out", she wakes up in his apartment. Of this, Brewer explained "You don't actually see the lead-up – one minute she meets Rhys in a bar, the next minute we see that they've already slept together!" Kate is ashamed of her behavior and the situation is made worse when she is unable to remember Rhys' name. Brewer said Kate feels awkward about the whole thing and starts to freak out as she wonders why she went out and did what she did. When Kate and Rhys meet again, they have different attitudes to their one-night stand. Brewer opined Rhys is a "bit of a player", so it is not a big deal to him, but Kate is uncomfortable and tries to cover her tracks. Inside Soap said viewers would be surprised by the development and Brewer admitted to having some misgivings about the storyline, as she thought it was too soon for Kate to be pursuing someone else. However, the actress said she understood Kate trying to move on from Mark.

Brewer later told Channel 5 that Kate's fling with Rhys was a release from everything that has been happening in her life up to that point. Kate is punished for her actions when Michelle Tran (HaiHa Le) confronts her about Rhys. Kate is shocked as she barely knows Michelle and the confrontation takes place in public at Harold's Store. Michelle accuses Kate of having sex with Rhys to hurt her housemate, Kyle Canning (Chris Milligan). Kate does not know how to respond and when Kyle learns what happened, he is mortified. Brewer said "In Michelle's crazy mind, she was doing the honorable thing by sticking up for Kyle." Kate realises something is not quite right with Michelle and knows to steer clear of her in the future. The actress added if Kate could go back in time, she would not go near Rhys. However, she can only put the matter behind her and move on. In November 2011, Brewer said it would be interesting to revisit the relationship between Kate and Rhys.

=== Noah Parkin ===
In July 2011, Orpheus Pledger joined the cast as Noah Parkin, a student who enrols at Erinsborough High. Noah befriends Kate's sister, Sophie, as they are both into music and enjoy playing the guitar. Sophie develops a crush on Noah, but he does not notice as he has taken a shine to Kate. Pledger explained "Noah doesn't realise Sophie's got the hots for him and he falls for Kate. He thinks Kate's beautiful and always wants to be around her. He thinks he's got a shot because she's really nice to him - but he takes her friendly gestures the wrong way." The actor later expanded on this saying Kate is one of a few people who was nice to him from the start. Kate did not judge him and Noah takes her natural friendliness for something more than it is. Andrew Robinson (Jordan Patrick Smith) is the first to realise Noah has a crush on Kate and he warns her about it. Brewer said Kate is hesitant about giving Noah the wrong idea and she suggests she should stop tutoring him. However, Noah denies having a crush on her and implies he is actually in love with Summer Hoyland (Jordy Lucas). Kate accepts this and is unaware of what Noah is really thinking. When asked if Noah's feelings for Kate come between her and her sister, Brewer explained "While Kate isn't aware that Noah has feelings for her, it doesn't really impact on she and Sophie. She's just conscious of her little sister getting hurt".

Kate learns Mark is dead and she struggles with the news and her grief. Brewer told Inside Soap that Kate goes into shock as she thought there was a small chance she could be with Mark if he came out of witness protection. Kate goes to the local History Wall project, where she meets Noah. Brewer said "Kate feels lost and alone, and needs to tell someone how she feels. She lets her guard down, and Noah's there for her." In the moment, Kate kisses Noah and Brewer said it could have happened with anyone. Kate regrets her actions, especially when Noah gives her a gift as he is convinced she reciprocates his feelings. Brewer said Kate had no idea Noah felt that way about her as she thought he liked Summer. She tries to make him understand he has the wrong impression, but Noah does not listen. Brewer explained everything in Kate's life is at risk if the kiss is ever revealed.

When Sophie decides to drop out of Noah's band, Kate hopes Noah will leave her alone. However, Noah does not get the message and when he tries to get Kate to admit her feelings for him, she calls him a stalker. A TV Soap writer said Noah is "shattered" and he then reveals their kiss to everyone. When Noah learns Kate's teaching career could be over, he admits to lying to get her into trouble. Andrew later finds Sophie tearing into Noah for trying to ruin her sister's career and he tells her Kate did kiss Noah. Sophie then tells Priya Kapoor (Menik Gooneratne), the acting principal of Erinsborough High, that Noah was not lying and Kate's teaching career is placed in jeopardy. Kate appears before Priya at a hearing to decide what course of action should be taken. Kate chooses not to reveal the reason behind her kiss with Noah was her grief at Mark's death.

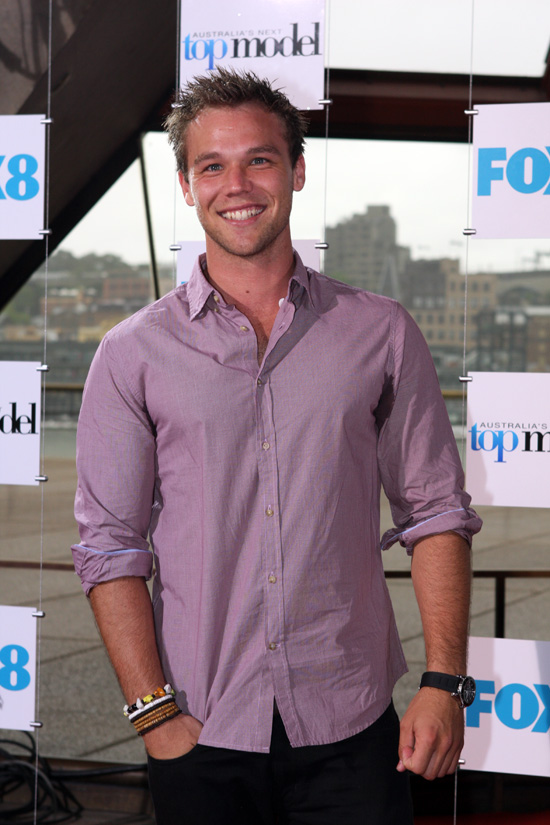
Lincoln Lewis joined the cast as Dominic Emmerson.

=== Port Douglas ===
Following the Noah incident and the temporary loss of her job, Kate decides to "kick-start her life" and spend some time away from Erinsborough. Brewer told Colin Vickery from The Advertiser that Kate had been through "a lot of heartache" and she needed the break to find herself again. Brewer commented "After the year she has just had with her boyfriend dying, and then kissing Noah and losing her career, she's fed up and not going to take it any more, so she sets about making some radical changes which will have a huge impact on the direction of her life." Kate decides to go to Port Douglas in Queensland and the cast and crew filmed on location in the state. Brewer said she had a fantastic time and enjoyed seeing Kate letting her guard down. Lincoln Lewis joined the cast as Kate's love interest Dominic Emmerson, a marine biologist. Brewer and Lewis previously worked together on The Sleepover Club.

Kate first encounters Dominic when she loses her phone on the beach, which Dominic finds. Kate is initially suspicious of "smooth-talking" Dominic, but she slowly comes round to him and they have a holiday romance. Brewer stated that she loved the storyline because as well as the Kate and Dominic romance, there was also Paul Robinson's (Stefan Dennis) attempt to drag Kate back to Erinsborough and the life she thought she had escaped from. When asked what was coming up for Kate, Brewer explained "She is lost and trying to find herself, and it's not going to be an easy path for her, lots more ups and downs to come, and the people around her may have to adjust to the new Kate. And she has new hair!"

=== Departure ===
On 11 November 2013, it was announced that Brewer had quit Neighbours, so she could pursue new acting projects. The actress stated "Having now been on Neighbours for over five years, I really feel like I've done my character justice and the time is right to close this chapter and open the next exciting one. I'm incredibly grateful for the time I've spent on Neighbours and now I'm ready to challenge myself in a new and different ways. I also want to do more travelling, something I haven't been able to do." Brewer filmed her final scenes in December 2013. Details of Kate's final storyline were released in March 2014. Kate is shot shortly after accepting Mark's marriage proposal. Her life is "left hanging in the balance", as she collapses into Mark's arms, before she dies from her injuries. Brewer's final scenes aired on 8 April 2014. The actress later admitted that she loved her exit storyline and was "overwhelmed" by the effort the writers had put into it.

The episodes following Kate's death focused on the search for the person who shot her. Stephen Montague (Damian Hill) and Mark's ex-girlfriend Sienna Matthews (Sarah Roberts) emerge as suspects. During his appearance on This Morning, Dennis said the shooter was seen in the episode. He also thought the whodunnit was "really clever" and said it would be dragged out for a while. He added "it takes a long time and everybody's under suspicion." It is later revealed that Kate was shot by Victor Cleary (Richard Sutherland), who shot her in retaliation for Paul killing his brother, Gus (Ben Barrack), in 2004.

== Storylines ==
Kate and her siblings are nieces and nephew of Paul Robinson and they are devastated when their mother dies following a hit-and-run accident. They initially refuse to accept any help, but Susan Kennedy (Jackie Woodburne) eventually convinces Kate to move into Number 24 Ramsay Street, which is owned by the Salvation Army. Kate finds employment at Harold's Store and enrols at Erinsborough High, where she befriends Donna Freedman, Declan Napier and Bridget Parker (Eloise Mignon). Kate is bullied by Amanda Fowler, especially when she is tasked with organising the Debutante Ball. It emerges that Kate was a talented dancer before her mother's death and Harry pays for some dance lessons for her. Kate works hard to get into a showcase judged by Jason Coleman and she later earns a place at the Ministry of Dance. Lou Carpenter (Tom Oliver) becomes the Ramsay siblings' guardian after the DHS threatens to place them in care. Kate develops a crush on Declan, who is struggling with the death of his wife, Bridget. Declan and Kate kiss and he eventually asks her out on a date, but it does not end well. Kate gets a paid dancing job with Terry Kearney's (Peter Moon) company and fellow dancer, Candace Carey, becomes jealous of her.

Kate and Declan begin dating and Kate is granted legal guardianship of Harry and Sophie when she turns 18. Kate begins a teaching course at Eden Hills University and is given a placement at Erinsborough High. Kate ends her relationship with Declan when she learns he has been lying to her and his family. After Paul Robinson is pushed from the Lassiter's Hotel mezzanine, Kate gives his wife, Rebecca (Jane Hall), a false alibi. Rebecca later confesses that she pushed Paul. Detective Mark Brennan asks Kate on a date and she accepts. Declan tries to put Kate off Mark by claiming Mark has been threatening him. Mark and Kate begin dating, but when Kate confesses to giving Rebecca a false alibi, Mark breaks up with her. They get back together when Mark tells Kate he loves her. When Mark is asked to go into witness protection, Kate agrees to go with him. Kate and Sophie are too late to meet Mark and Kate is devastated to find he has gone. She later has a one-night stand with Rhys Lawson. When Kate learns Mark has been killed, she is comforted by her student Noah Parkin and they kiss. Noah tells acting principal Priya Kapoor and Kate's relationship with Sophie deteriorates because Sophie had a crush on Noah.

When Noah explains to Priya the circumstances surrounding the kiss, she decides to handle the investigation internally, but Kate quits her job. She takes off and goes to Port Douglas with Erin Salisbury (Elise Jansen). She had a brief romance with Dominic Emmerson. Dominic decides to accompany Kate to Vietnam, but Paul arrives to tell her that she needs to come home as Sophie is in danger of being taken into care. Kate reluctantly returns to Erinsborough, where she and Sophie talk through their issues. They decide to live apart. Kate realises she has feelings for Kyle and decides to fight for him, even though he is in a relationship with her friend Jade Mitchell (Gemma Pranita). She also becomes manager of Charlie's bar. When Kate discovers Lou has taken $8000 from Kyle's business account, she protects him and replaces the money. Kyle's grandmother, Sheila (Colette Mann), encourages Kate to go after him. Kate and Kyle kiss, but they both feel guilty and Kate tells Jade. Kate decides to return to teaching and she moves in with Paul and Sophie. Kate also befriends Georgia Brooks (Saskia Hampele) and is asked out by Mason Turner (Taylor Glockner).

Kate turns Mason down when she learns he is only eighteen, but she later changes her mind. When Mason is arrested for attempted armed robbery, Kate ends their brief relationship. But after he visits her to explain that he only did it to protect his family, she forgives him and they have sex. Paul does not approve of Mason, so Kate moves into Number 26. Kate is surprised when she sees Mark during an eclipse. He later turns up at her house and explains that he has been allowed to leave witness protection and has been living in Sydney for the past two years. Mark asks Kate to give their relationship another chance, but Kate learns that Mark has a girlfriend in Sydney and tells him that she chooses Mason. However, Mason believes he is second best and breaks up with Kate. Kate then has a one-night stand with Kyle, but tells Mason it was with Mark. He forgives her and they get back together. Kate believes she is pregnant, but soon learns that she has premature ovarian failure. When Mason suggests that they try for a baby, Kate realises that they both want different things and she breaks up with him. Mason tries to win Kate back, but she makes it clear that they are never getting back together.

Kate fails to get along with Georgia's cousin Gemma Reeves (Kathryn Beck), causing a strain on her friendship with Georgia. When Kyle and Georgia become engaged, Kate confides in Chris Pappas (James Mason) that she has fallen in love with Kyle. Unable to get over him, Kate moves in with Paul. Gem believes Kate is trying to turn Georgia against her and she gets Bailey Turner (Calen Mackenzie) to hack into Kate's email, where she discovers an unsent email from Kate to Kyle revealing the details of their one-night stand. Gem slips the email into the congratulatory messages at the engagement party, where Georgia reads it out. Georgia is devastated and ends her engagement and friendship with Kate. Georgia and Gem leave town and Bailey confesses to hacking Kate's laptop. Kate and Kyle find Georgia unconscious in a gas filled cottage and Kate saves her. Georgia is grateful, but does not want to mend their friendship. Kate admits that she is in love with Kyle and he reciprocates her feelings. They go on a couple of dates, but Kyle struggles to get over Georgia and breaks up with Kate. Mark returns to Erinsborough after helping out Mason. He decides to stay and win Kate back.

Rebecca also returns and she encourages Kate to get back with Mark. When Mark learns of Kate's infertility, he declares that it does not matter and he still wants to be with her. Kate continues to push Mark away, but when she is confronted by his ex-girlfriend, Kate starts thinking about her past relationships. She realises that they failed because she was not with the right person and she admits that she loves Mark. Kate and Mark get back together, but Paul does not approve of the relationship and Kate moves out. Kate is delighted when Sophie and Zeke Kinski (Matthew Werkmeister) return to Erinsborough to help celebrate her birthday. Before her party, Kate meets Mark at Lassiter's Lake, where she accepts his marriage proposal. Shortly after telling their friends, Kate is shot in the back by Victor Cleary and she dies.

== Reception ==
For her portrayal of Kate, Brewer was nominated for Most Popular New Female Talent at the 2010 Logie Awards. A writer for Holy Soap said Kate's most memorable moment was "Coping with the shock of losing her mother and the responsibility of becoming her siblings' guardian". The website also branded her a "plucky lass" and said her relationship with Declan kept viewers "hooked for yonks." A Sunday Mail columnist thought Kate was a "vulnerable teen". Erin McWhirter of the Herald Sun praised Brewer during Kate's 18th birthday scenes, stating "Brewer does a convincing job as Kate, bringing a real vulnerability to the character." A Daily Post reporter quipped "After her disastrous relationship with Declan, it's no wonder Kate's worried about her upcoming date with Brennan." A writer for the Daily Record stated Kate has "always been Miss Steady" and someone people could rely on, so it came as a shock to see her fall apart and give in to Noah's advances.

During the Noah storyline, Dianne Butler of the Herald Sun wondered if Kate was the "unstable one" as she appeared to tell a lot of lies. Butler's colleague, Cameron Adams called Kate "unlucky-in-love." When Kate's feelings for Kyle resurfaced, Kerry Barrett from All About Soap commented "Oh, dear. Just what does Neighbours' Kate Ramsay think she's doing? We all know she's got a crush on Kyle. Yes, Kyle who's dating her best friend, Jade. But we thought she was getting over it, moving on. And she was. Until she saw Kyle all dressed up for the bachelor auction (we've got to admit, he looked hot!) and her passion was ignited once more. Crikey!" Barrett added that the whole situation was bound to end in tears and believed that Kate should back off or she would "live to regret it!" In January 2014, while observing that Kyle was about to break up with Kate, Butler (Herald Sun) quipped "Kate, who is, for a smart girl with nice dresses, stupidly unaware it's coming."
