= Gloeckner =

Gloeckner is a surname. Notable people with the surname include:

- Lorry Gloeckner (born 1956), Canadian hockey player
- Phoebe Gloeckner (born 1960), American cartoonist, illustrator, painter, and novelist

== See also ==
- Glöckner
