= Conspiracy 365 =

- Written by: Michael Brindley; Mark Shirrefs; Sam Carroll; Kristen Dunphy; Shanti Gudgeon; Julie Lacy; Michael Miller; Michelle Offen; Kris Wyld
- Starring: Harrison Gilbertson; Taylor Glockner; Marny Kennedy; Julia Zemiro; Rob Carlton; Kate Kendall
- Country of origin: Australia
- Original language: English
- No. of episodes: 12

Production
- Executive producers: Peter Jenetsky; Linda Klejus; Tony Forrest; Paul Wylie
- Producers: Linda Klejus; Peter Jenetsky
- Running time: 40 minutes
- Production company: Circa Media

Original release
- Network: FMC
- Release: 14 January – 1 December 2012

Conspiracy 365 is a 12-part Australian television miniseries based on the novels written by Gabrielle Lord. Produced by Circa Media for Family Movie Channel, the series screened from January 2012. It also began screening on ABC3 in January 2014.

The series is based on a series of books written by Gabrielle Lord. It follows the adventures of Callum Ormond, an Australian 15-year-old who is forced to become a fugitive as he searches for the truth behind the death of a family member. The book series is in 17 installments, telling the story from January to December, and then Boges's story (Revenge) following the twelfth installment and Winter's story (Malice) following Callum's and then Callum's story again in a three book mini-series (Black Ops).

The television series screens in 12 forty minute to one-hour episodes throughout the year, one episode each month. It is supported by an interactive website with games, puzzles, photographs, behind the scene photographs and information, messages and videos from the characters.

The series aired exclusively to FMC on the first Saturday of every month in 2012, and the following day the episode was available to download on iTunes or rent from BigPond Movies. Previous episodes are already available for download or rent online. Viewers can sign up to iTunes for a complete season pass download to own all 12 episodes.

The series was shot in blocks of 4 episodes with a different director for each set: Paul Goldman for the first block, Pino Amenta for the second block, and Steve Mann for the third block. The Director of Photography is Laszlo Baranyai ACS HSC and the Production Design is by Tel Stolfo. The Story Producers are Michael Brindley and Mark Shirreffs. The series is written by Sam Carroll, Kristen Dunphy, Shanti Gudgeon, Julie Lacy, Michael Miller, Michelle Offen, and Kris Wyld, accompanied by the novels written by Gabrielle Lord.

== Cast ==
- Harrison Gilbertson as Callum 'Cal' Ormond / Ryan Spencer (aka Samuel Ormond)
- Taylor Glockner as Boges
- Marny Kennedy as Winter Frey
- David Whiteley as Rafe Ormond / Tom Ormond
- Julia Zemiro as Oriana de la Force
- Rob Carlton as Vulkan Sligo
- Kate Kendall as Emily Ormond
- Ryan O'Kane as Detective Dorian McGrath
- Debbie Zukerman as Detective Ferrara
- Aaron Jakubenko as Yuri and Zombie
- Sachin Joab as Bruno
- Dion Mills as Eric Blair
- Andrew Curry as Kelvin
- James Sorensen as Jake
- Damien Richardson as Nelson Sharkey
- Nicholas Bell as Rathbone
- Julia Blake as Melba Snipe
- Penne Hackforth-Jones as Sister Jerome
- Syd Brisbane as Repro

== List of episodes ==
(Episode information retrieved from Australian Television Information Archive).

No.	Title	Directed by	Written by	Original release date
1	"January"	Paul Goldman	Michelle Offen	14 January 2012
2	"February"	Paul Goldman	Kristen Dunphy	4 February 2012
3	"March"	Paul Goldman	Michael Miller	3 March 2012
4	"April"	Paul Goldman	Michael Miller	7 April 2012
5	"May"	Pino Amenta	Mark Shirrefs	5 May 2012
6	"June"	Pino Amenta	Michelle Offen	2 June 2012
7	"July"	Pino Amenta	Julie Lacy	7 July 2012
8	"August"	Steve Mann	Sam Carroll	4 August 2012
9	"September"	Steve Mann	Sam Carroll	1 September 2012
10	"October"	Pino Amenta	Shanti Gudgeon	6 October 2012
11	"November"	Steve Mann	Michael Miller, Michael Brindley & Mark Shirrefs	3 November 2012
12	"December"	Steve Mann	Shanti Gudgeon	1 December 2012

There is one episode for each month of the year. At the end of each month Callum is placed in a dangerous situation which provides suspense until the next episode.

== See also ==
- List of Australian television series
