= Gottfried Glöckner =

German composer and music educator

- Born: 24 June 1937 (age 89); Chemnitz
- Education: Hochschule für Musik Carl Maria von Weber
- Occupations: Composer; Choral conductor; Music educator
- Spouse: Helga Glöckner-Neubert
- Awards: Hanns Eisler Prize

Gottfried Glöckner (born 24 June 1937) is a German composer, choral conductor and music educator.

== Life ==
Born in Chemnitz, Glöckner attended the Zwickau Conservatory. Afterwards he worked as a music teacher in Bad Liebenwerda and Frankfurt (Oder). From 1970 to 1974 he studied composition with Manfred Weiss at the Hochschule für Musik Carl Maria von Weber in Dresden. He worked as a freelance composer and choral conductor in Frankfurt (Oder). Glöckner's compositions were published by bellmannmusik, Edition Choris Mundi and Verlag Neue Musik. His Concerto for Orchestra was first performed in Havana in 1984.

He was married to the writer Helga Glöckner-Neubert until her death in 2017.

== Awards ==
- 1986: Hanns Eisler Prize

== Compositions ==
- Alle Kinder können sich verstehen for children' choir and piano
- Bratschenstücke (Viola pieces) for viola and piano (2011)
- Concertino for accordion and wind quintet
- Erste Liebe for medium voice and piano
- Flötentrio for flutes
- Fünf Intermezzi for clarinet and piano
- Kleine Suite for accordion solo
- Konzert für Orchester
- Musik zur Weihnachtszeit for small ensemble
- Philosophen und die Liebe for medium voice and piano
- Präludium und Passacaglia
- Sieben Stücke for horn and piano
- Sonata for flute and piano
- Sonatine for clarinet and piano
