= Helga Glöckner-Neubert =

German writer

- Born: 5 September 1938; Oberfrohna
- Died: 27 August 2017 (aged 78); Alt Madlitz
- Education: Karl-Marx-University Leipzig
- Occupation: Writer
- Organizations: Leipzig University
- Spouse: Gottfried Glöckner

Helga Glöckner-Neubert (5 September 1938 – 27 August 2017) was a German writer.

== Life ==
Born in Oberfrohna, Glöckner-Neubert completed her education at the librarian school of the Karl-Marx-University Leipzig. She then studied German and Slavic Studies. Afterwards she was a lecturer for Russian language at the University of Leipzig. She was engaged in a Kulturhaus and was also otherwise involved in various cultural tasks in the Bezirk Frankfurt. The centre of her life was Frankfurt (Oder), which is reflected in various city-related publications. With her husband, the composer Gottfried Glöckner, she created an extensive body of songs. She was a member of the Deutscher Schriftstellerverband.

Glöckner-Neubert died in Alt Madlitz aged 78.

== Work ==
- Festumzug – 725 Jahre Frankfurt. Frankfurt an der Oder 1978.
- Windkinder. Kinderbuchverlag Berlin, Berlin 1979.
- Frankfurt (Oder), Brockhaus-Verlag, Leipzig 1980.
- Das kleine Haus mit Mann und Maus. Kinderbuchverlag Berlin, 1989, ISBN 978-3-358-01233-8.
- Stadtbilder aus Frankfurt. Stadt-Bild-Verlag, Berlin 1992, ISBN 978-3-928741-24-8.
- Alle Wege bin ich abgegangen. Verlag Die Furt, 2012, ISBN 978-3-939960-18-8.
- published after 27 August 2017: Auf dem Weg zu Dir; volume of poems (summary of all poems that have not yet appeared in the volume "Alle Wege bin ich abgegangen"; compiled by Gottfried Glöckner)
