= Gabrielle Lord =

Australian writer

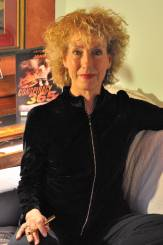
- Born: Gabrielle Craig Lord; 1946 (age 79–80); Sydney, New South Wales, Australia
- Occupation: Novelist
- Writing career
- Genre: Psychological thrillers

Gabrielle Craig Lord (born 1946) is an Australian writer who has been described as Australia's first lady of crime. She has published a wide range of writing including reviews, articles, short stories and non-fiction, but she is best known for her psychological thrillers.

== Life ==
Gabrielle Lord was born in Sydney. She was educated at Kincoppal Rose Bay School of the Sacred Heart and the University of New England in Armidale, where she obtained an Honours degree in Victorian Literature. She worked as a teacher and as a public servant with the Commonwealth Employment Service. In 1978, with the support of a New Writer's Fellowship, she took a year off work to write full-time. The novel she wrote during the bulk of that time, A Death in the Family, received a bad reader's report, so Lord put it aside and in the remaining three weeks of her year off wrote Fortress. It was an instant success and, with the money from the film rights, she was able to leave paid employment in 1983 and return to full-time writing (Jennifer Ellison, Rooms of their Own, Penguin, Ringwood, 1986, p. 202). Lord's other interests include animal welfare and a type of spirituality that is manifested in appreciation of the music of the Taizé Community, a spiritual community in France.

In February 2017, Lord spoke at a fundraising event for the far-right Q Society of Australia, where she claimed that there was a "war" going on between Islam and the West, and that the Muslims were "better prepared than we are".

Gabrielle Lord likes cats. She lives in a beachside Sydney suburb and has one daughter and four granddaughters.

== Career ==
Lord's third novel was Fortress, a thriller about the kidnapping of a country school teacher and her students. It was inspired by the Faraday School kidnapping, but takes dramatic licence with the actual events. It was an instant success, was translated into six languages, and was made into a film. Since then she has written many thrillers, including two series: the Gemma Lincoln series about an ex-cop PI, and the Jack McCain series about a forensic scientist.

She believes strongly in research, saying it is "necessary for today's savvy readers" and to this end has, over the years, spent time with scientists, detectives, and forensic anthropologists; she has studied some Anatomy at the University of Sydney; and has done work experience with a private security business.

Two of her novels have been filmed: Fortress (1986), a feature film adapted by scriptwriter Everett De Roche and directed by Arch Nicholson; and Whipping Boy (1996), a telemovie adapted by scriptwriter Peter Yeldham and directed by Di Drew.

In June 2011, filming for a TV adaptation of Lord's young adult fiction series, Conspiracy 365, began. The series aired in Australia on Family Movie Channel in 2012.

== Awards ==
- 2002 Ned Kelly Awards for Best Crime Novel for Death Delights
- 2003 Davitt Award (joint winner) for best crime novel by an Australian woman for Baby Did a Bad Bad Thing

== Works ==
=== Fiction ===
Standalone works

- Fortress (1980) ISBN 0-7336-1024-2
- Tooth and Claw (1983)
- Jumbo (1986) ISBN 0-7336-1092-7
- Salt (1990) ISBN 0-7336-1036-6
- Whipping Boy (1992) ISBN 0-7336-1023-4
- Bones (1995)
- The Sharp End (1998)
- Dishonour (2014)
- Sisters (2019) ISBN 978-1-9256-4260-5

Gemma Lincoln series

- Feeding the Demons (1999) ISBN 0-7336-1240-7
- Baby Did a Bad Bad Thing (2002) ISBN 0-7336-1592-9
- Spiking the Girl (2004) ISBN 0-7336-1622-4
- Shattered (2007) ISBN 978-0-7336-1958-8
- Death by Beauty (2012) ISBN 978-0-7336-2730-9

Jack McCain series

- Death Delights (2001)
- Lethal Factor (2003)
- Dirty Weekend (2005)

Conspiracy 365 series

- January (2010)
- February (2010)
- March (2010)
- April (2010)
- May (2010)
- June (2010)
- July (2010)
- August (2010)
- September (2010)
- October (2010)
- November (2010)
- December (2010)
- Revenge (2011)
- Malice (2012)
- Missing (2013)
- Hunted (2013)
- Endgame (2013)

Code Black editions have been released for each separate book. The Code Black editions include new code-crackers. The January: Code Black book includes a free code wheel and four pictures from the TV series, which aired on FMC.

48 Hours series

- The Vanishing (2017)
- The Medusa Curse (2018)

=== Young adult fiction ===
- Monkey Undercover (2006)
- Conspiracy 365 (2010–, series of 17 novels)Sneak Preview *
- 48 Hours (2017–, series of 2 novels)

=== Non-fiction ===
- Growing Up Catholic: An Infinitely Funny Guide for the Faithful, the Fallen and Everyone In-Between (with others) (1986)
- Grace of Angels (1996)
- Sanctuary: Where Heaven Touches Earth (2005, co-written with and an accompanying CD by Trisha Watts)
- The Nana Diaries

== Adaptations ==
Two of her novels have been filmed: Fortress (1986), a feature film adapted by scriptwriter Everett De Roche and directed by Arch Nicholson; and Whipping Boy (1996), a telemovie adapted by scriptwriter Peter Yeldham and directed by Di Drew.

In June 2011, filming for a TV adaptation of Lord's young adult fiction series, Conspiracy 365, began. The series aired in Australia on Family Movie Channel in 2012.
