= Josef Brown =

Australian actor, dancer and choreographer

- Born: 8 October 1969 (age 57); Woomera, Australia
- Occupations: Actor, dancer, choreographer
- Years active: 1991–present
- Spouse: Katherine Griffiths
- Children: 2

Josef Brown (born 8 October 1969) is an Australian actor, dancer and choreographer. Brown attended The McDonald College of the Arts and the Australian Ballet School, where he was promoted to soloist in 1994. He joined the Sydney Dance Company in 1997 and appeared in and choreographed various productions. Brown originated the role of Johnny Castle in the stage adaptation of Dirty Dancing. For his portrayal of Johnny, Brown won the Outstanding Performance in a Stage Musical accolade at the 2005 Australian Dance Awards.

In 2010, Brown was cast as Auctus in Spartacus: Gods of the Arena. He also appeared in the first series of Dance Academy. In 2012, Brown originated the role of Charlie Redding in An Officer and a Gentleman, The Musical and made a guest appearance in Home and Away. From February 2013 to March 2015, Brown appeared as Matt Turner in the long-running soap opera Neighbours.

== Early life ==
Brown was born on 8 October 1969 in Woomera, South Australia. He was raised in a working-class suburb of Sydney by his parents, a secretary and an information technology manager, who later divorced. Brown was an energetic child, who was initially into sports. At the age of fifteen, he attended jazz classes and learned to breakdance. When he was sixteen, Brown realised that he wanted to act and he enrolled at The McDonald College of the Arts. He finished his high school education and also learned how to dance there. Brown then "fell in love" with classical ballet and began attending the Australian Ballet School in Melbourne in 1991. By 1994, Brown was promoted to soloist and had principal roles in many classic and contemporary productions including The Merry Widow and The Nutcracker.

== Career ==
=== 1995–2009 ===
During a leave of absence from the Australian Ballet School, Brown performed in a production of In the Body of the Son for the Nomad Dance Theatre. In 1996, Brown danced with the Modern Dans Toplulguu in Ankara, Turkey and a year later, he joined the Sydney Dance Company. During his time with the company, dance choreographer Graeme Murphy created many roles for Brown, including; John the Baptist in Salome (1998), Zeus in Mythologia (2000) and the Swan Silver duet for Tivoli (2001). Brown also choreographed productions for both the Sydney Dance Company and the Australian Ballet. In December 2003, Brown travelled to the Palestinian city of Ramallah to view the work of dancer, choreographer and writer Nicholas Rowe. The footage Brown shot while he was out there, was turned into a short documentary called Art, During Siege, which was later broadcast on ABC Television.

Brown went with the Sydney Dance Company on its American tour of Ellipse in February 2004 and shared the lead role of Dorian in Shades of Gray with Joshua Consandine. Brown decided to leave the Sydney Dance Company in mid-2004. He told Sharon Verghis from The Sydney Morning Herald that the parting was amicable, although Murphy and associate director Janet Vernon had been "a little shocked and sad" when they were told the news. Brown stated "I left on very good terms with the SDC. Graeme and I have gotten along well – we've had our ups and downs, of course, conflict, but that's part of the creative process." Verghis said Brown had become "the male face" of the company, noting that he developed a high-profile tenure while he was there.

Brown went on to originate the role of Johnny Castle in the stage musical Dirty Dancing: The Classic Story on Stage. When Eleanor Bergstein decided to open the stage show in Australia, she initially struggled to find someone to play Johnny, but after being told about Brown, she approached him to play the role. Brown met with Bergstein and successfully auditioned for the part. He then studied Patrick Swayze's performance from the film, took lessons in mambo and the cha-cha-cha and went through intensive acting training. He also hired a voice coach to help him with an American accent. Dirty Dancing had its world premiere in Sydney in November 2004 and Brown went on to win the Outstanding Performance in a Stage Musical accolade at the 2005 Australian Dance Awards. Brown continued to play the role of Johnny throughout the production's run in New Zealand, Germany, London's West End and the pre-Broadway tour in the United States.

=== 2010–present ===
On 6 August 2010, a staff writer from AfterElton reported that Brown had been cast in the role of gladiator Auctus in Spartacus: Gods of the Arena. Auctus was introduced as a love interest for Barca (played by Antonio Te Maioha). That same year, Brown made a guest appearance in Rake and joined the first series of Dance Academy as Patrick. Brown choreographed Joana Weinberg's musical Every Single Saturday, which premiered in February 2012. He also played Lord Capulet in the Australian Ballet's Romeo and Juliet. From March 2012, Brown appeared in the brief guest role of Dale Canning in Home and Away.

Brown originated the role of Charlie Redding in the premiere production of An Officer and a Gentleman, The Musical, which opened at the Lyric Theatre on 18 May 2012. The production ran for six weeks. On 4 November 2012, it was announced that Brown had joined the cast of the long-running soap opera Neighbours, as Sergeant Matt Turner. Matt arrived in Erinsborough with his wife and three children and Brown commented "It's a great family and a little bit different." The actor began filming his scenes at the serial's Melbourne studios in October. He made his first appearance as Matt in early February 2013. Brown departed Neighbours in March 2015, following his character's death. He reprised the role for one episode in August 2016. Brown made another guest appearance in Home and Away in 2019 as Dr. Mike. Brown has a supporting role as Bryce Anderson in the 2021 feature film Buckley's Chance.

== Personal life ==
Brown is married to fellow dancer, Katherine Griffiths. The couple have two children.

== Filmography ==
Year	Title	Role	Notes
2010	Dance Academy	Patrick	14 episodes
2010	Rake	Ben Rigby	1 episodes
2011	Spartacus: Gods of the Arena	Auctus	3 episodes
2012	Home and Away	Dale Canning	1 episode
2013–2016	Neighbours	Matt Turner	Regular role: 427 episodes
2014	Neighbours vs Zombies	Matt Turner	Web series, 2 episodes
2019	Ms Fisher's Modern Murder Mysteries	Graham King	1 episode
2019	Home and Away	Mike	2 episodes
2021	Buckley's Chance	Bryce Anderson	
