= Taylor Glockner =

Australian actor (born 1991)

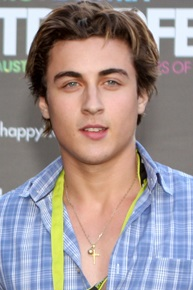
- Glockner at Tropfest in 2013
- Born: 30 July 1991 (age 35); Brisbane, Queensland, Australia
- Occupations: Actor; producer
- Years active: 2010–present
- Children: 1

Taylor Glockner (born 30 July 1991) is an Australian actor. Shortly after graduating from the Film and Television Studio International, he was cast as Boges in the television miniseries Conspiracy 365. From 2013 to 2014, Glockner played Mason Turner in the soap opera Neighbours. After leaving Neighbours, Glockner had a recurring role in the television series Mako: Island of Secrets from 2015 until 2016. He is a co-founder of the production company Calligram Pictures.

== Early and personal life ==
Taylor Glockner was born in Brisbane. He attended Anglican Church Grammar School and then the Queensland University of Technology, where he deferred a business studies course to join the full-time acting program at the Film and Television Studio International in West End. Glockner graduated in May 2011.

Glockner married his partner Tegan in October 2022. Their first child, a son, was born in August 2023.

== Career ==
Two weeks after graduating from drama school, Glockner was cast as Boges in the television miniseries Conspiracy 365, based on Gabrielle Lord's novels. He initially auditioned for the role of Callum Ormond, but lost the part to Harrison Gilbertson. However, Glockner impressed the casting agents and they rewrote the part of Boges around him. Glockner stayed with his aunt in Melbourne, while filming for Conspiracy 365. Glockner also made a guest appearance in ABC2's The Strange Calls, and The Elephant Princess.

In November 2012, Glockner joined the cast of Neighbours in the regular role of Mason Turner. Glockner had previously auditioned for guest roles on the show, before the producers decided that they wanted to develop a long-term character specifically for him. Glockner told Brooke Hunter from Femail that former Neighbours cast member Guy Pearce was one of his main reasons for auditioning for the show, as Pearce is his inspiration. Glockner had a two-year contract with Neighbours, but on 3 December 2013, it was announced that Glockner was to leave the show. Both the producers and Glockner – who had shot nearly 1,000 scenes in one year – felt the character of Mason needed a rest. Glockner did not rule out a return to Neighbours in the future.

In May 2014, it was announced that Glockner had been cast in the upcoming independent film No Two Snowflakes, directed by Ron V. Brown. Glockner plays Finn in the film. He told Daniel Kilkelly from Digital Spy that he was in Brisbane for another role when he learned about the film. He was asked to send in a self-tape and he then flew to Melbourne to meet with the producers. Glockner appeared in the second season of Mako: Island of Secrets, and reprised his role in season three.

After returning to Brisbane from Los Angeles, where he had been auditioning for shows, Glockner formed the production company Calligram Pictures with filmmakers Noah Gerometta, Izac Brodrick, Jackson Kanaris and Jack Murphy in 2020. The company has produced the short film Flesh and Ivory and created the feature film Bloom, which Glockner also appears in. Glockner has also teamed up with his former Neighbours co-star Alan Fletcher to option a book for a miniseries called The Queenslander. In 2024, Calligram Pictures released short film Co-Stars, which was co-written and directed by Brodrick. Further releases include short films Rise & Fall, which stars Glockner's former Neighbours co-star Harley Bonner, and Bleeder which also stars Glockner.

== Filmography ==
Year	Title	Role	Notes
2010	The Verge		Episode: "Chemical Brothers"
2011	The Elephant Princess	Party DJ	Episodes: "Feud" and "Sacrifice"
2012	The Strange Calls	Bosh Mackenzie	Episode: "Napoleon"
2012	Conspiracy 365	Boges	
2013–2014	Neighbours	Mason Turner	Series regular
2014	Neighbours vs Zombies	Mason Turner	Webseries
2015–2016	Mako: Island of Secrets	Chris	Guest (Season 2); Recurring (Season 3)
2017	No Two Snowflakes	Finn	Feature film
2024	Bloom	Julian	Also producer
2024	Bleeder	Jed	Short film
