= Kip Gamblin =

Australian ballet dancer and actor (born 1975)

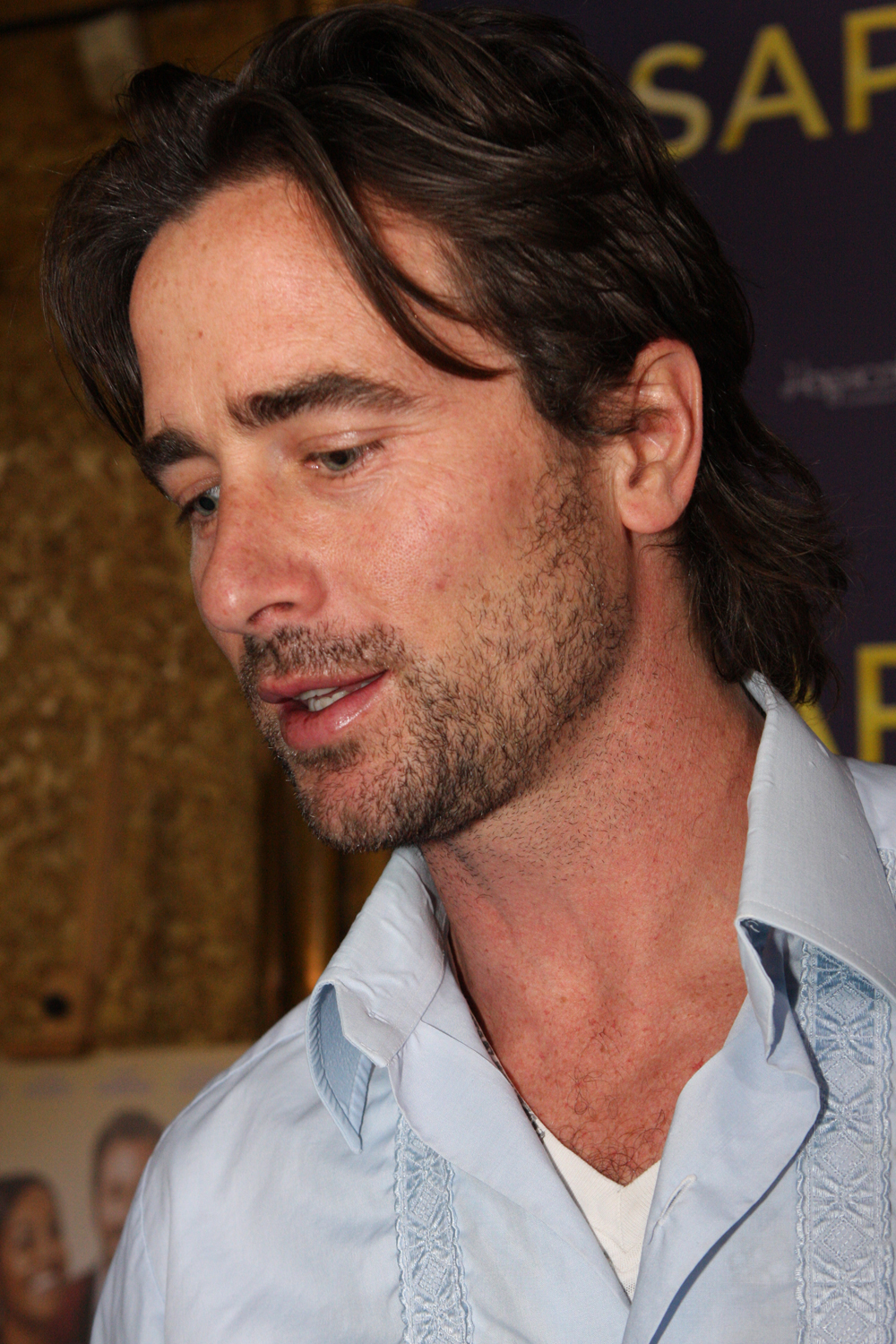
- Gamblin at The Sapphires Australian Premiere in August 2012.
- Born: 5 July 1975 (age 51)
- Education: The McDonald College; Australian Ballet School
- Occupations: Actor, ballet dancer, real estate agent
- Years active: 1992–present
- Known for: Home and Away; Neighbours
- Spouse: Linda Ridgway
- Children: 2

Kip Gamblin (born 5 July 1975) is an Australian ballet dancer and actor. From 2003 until 2005, Gamblin played Scott Hunter in Home and Away. The part earned him the 2004 Logie Award for Most Popular New Male Talent. After moving to the United Kingdom, Gamblin was cast as paramedic Greg Fallon in the BBC medical drama series Casualty. Following his move back to Australia, Gamblin starred in All Saints and Dance Academy. In 2013, Gamblin began appearing in Neighbours as Brad Willis, making him the third actor to play the role after Benjamin Grant Mitchell and Scott Michaelson. He made his final appearance in that role on 7 April 2017.

== Career ==
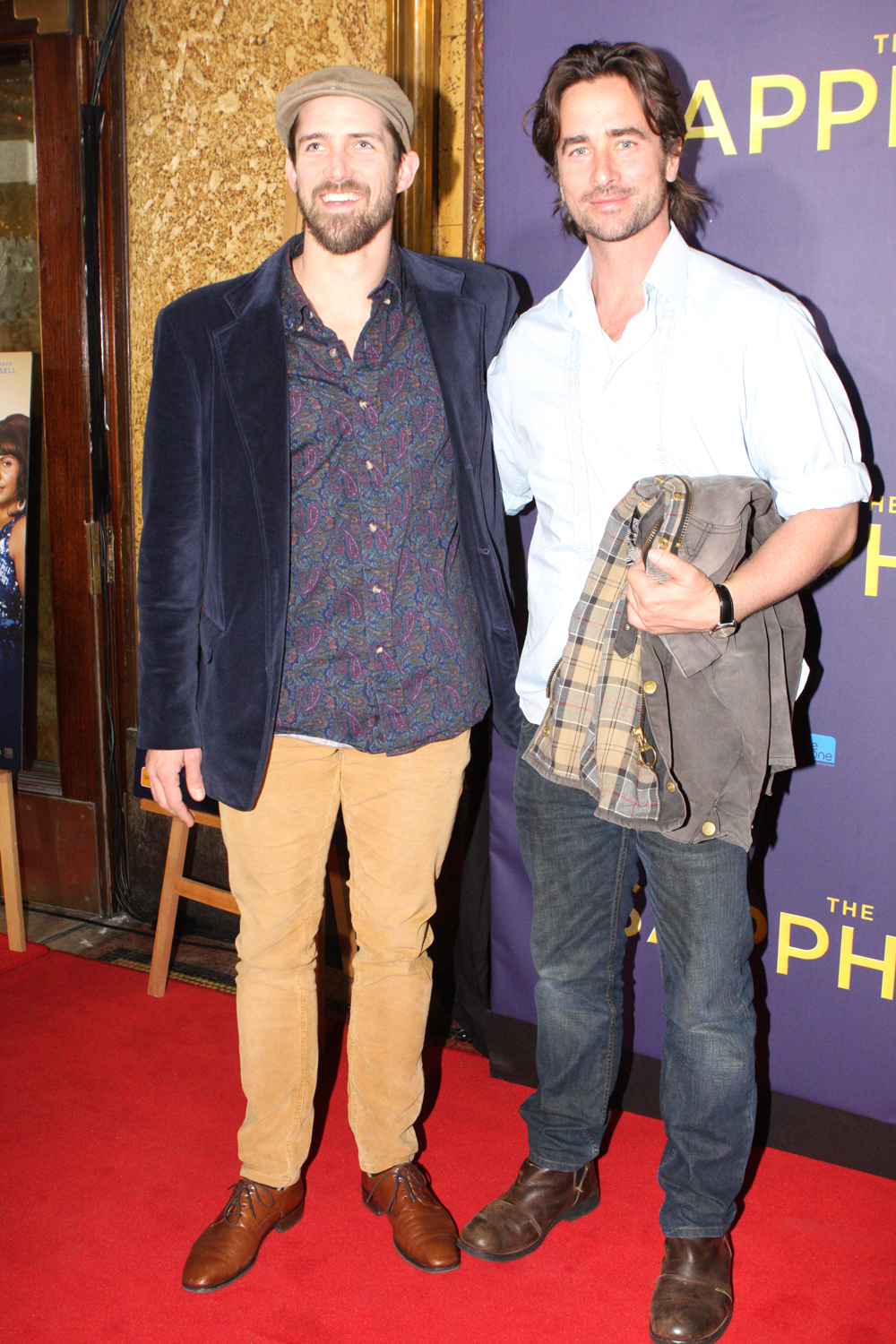
Kip Gamblin (right) appearing at the premiere of The Sapphires.

Gamblin trained as a ballet dancer at The McDonald College of Performing Arts, Sydney and completed his training at the Australian Ballet School, Melbourne. He performed with the Australian Ballet, the West Australian Ballet and the Sydney Dance Company between 1994 and 2002, and had leading roles in Paquita and Le Corsaire among many other ballet productions. In 2000 he was chosen to perform as the sole male dancer presenting Barbra Streisand on stage for her Australian tour of Timeless.

Film credits for Gamblin include the 2001 film Moulin Rouge!, in which he played a Latin dancer and the Australian feature films Kick and Mao's Last Dancer. From January 2003 to November 2005 Gamblin played the role of Scott Hunter in the Australian television soap opera Home and Away for which he won the Logie Award for Most Popular New Male Talent in 2004. He departed the series in the 2005 season finale.

Gamblin moved to the United Kingdom with his family in 2005, but has since moved back to Australia. From June 2006 to 2008 he played the role of paramedic Greg Fallon in the British medical series Casualty. He also made an appearance as Greg Fallon in Holby City, when the character was one of the paramedics who attended the scene of Mark and Tricia Williams' car accident. In 2008, Gamblin portrayed the role of Dr Adam Rossi in the Australian medical series All Saints. In 2010, Gamblin joined the cast of Australian teen drama series Dance Academy as male dance instructor Zach.

In 2012, Gamblin portrayed the role of Rick Taylor in the Australian television drama series Tricky Business which lasted for one season. In May 2013, Gamblin took over the role of Brad Willis from Scott Michaelson in the Australian television soap opera Neighbours. Gamblin departed the show on 7 April 2017. He filmed his final scenes in late 2016. Gamblin joined the 2017 Australian touring production of The Bodyguard musical as Frank Farmer, alongside Paulini. The production opened on 21 April at the Sydney Lyric.

== Personal life ==
Gamblin is married to dancer Linda Ridgway and they have two sons.

== Filmography ==
=== Television ===
Year	Title	Role	Notes
2001	Home and Away	Patrick Curl	Season 14, 1 episode
2003–2005	Home and Away	Scott Hunter	Seasons 16–18, main role
2003	Home and Away: Hearts Divided	Scott Hunter	Special
2006–2008	Casualty	Greg Fallon	Seasons 20–22, 70 episodes
2006	Holby City	Greg Fallon	Season 9, 1 episode
2007	The Omid Djalili Show		Season 1, 1 episode
2008–09	All Saints	Dr. Adam Rossi	Seasons 11–12, 42 episodes
2012	Tricky Business	Rick Taylor	Season 1, 13 episodes
2012–13	Dance Academy	Zach	Seasons 2–3, 29 episodes
2013–17	Neighbours	Brad Willis	Seasons 29–33, 1,070 episodes
2021	Harrow	Vincent, State Ranger	Season 3, 1 episode

=== Film ===
Year	Title	Role	Notes
1999	Kick	Roland	Feature film
2001	Moulin Rouge!	Latin Dancer	Feature film
2009	Mao's Last Dancer	David	Feature film
2015	Gone	Gray	Short film

== Stage ==
Year	Title	Role	Notes
1995	Manon	Dancer, Corps de Ballet	Festival Theatre, Adelaide with The Australian Ballet
1996	Onegin	Dancer, Corps de Ballet	Canberra Theatre, Festival Theatre, Adelaide with The Australian Ballet
1996	Beyond Bach / Las Hermanas / In the Middle, Somewhat Elevated	Dancer, Corps de Ballet	Festival Theatre, Adelaide with The Australian Ballet
1996	Shadow in the Facet / Aurora's Wedding / In the Middle, Somewhat Elevated	Dancer	State Theatre, Melbourne with The Australian Ballet
1996	Alchemy / The Deep End / Red Earth	Dancer, Corps de Ballet	State Theatre, Melbourne with The Australian Ballet
1997	Sinfonietta / Apollo / In the Upper Room	Dancer, Corps de Ballet	Sydney Opera House with The Australian Ballet
1997	Cinderella	Dancer, Corps de Ballet	Festival Theatre, Adelaide with The Australian Ballet
2002	Ellipse	Dancer	Playhouse, Melbourne with Sydney Dance Company
2017	The Bodyguard	Frank Farmer	Sydney Lyric Theatre, Lyric Theatre, Brisbane, Regent Theatre, Melbourne
