= Richard Jasek =

Australian writer

- Born: 1964 or 1965 (age 61–62); Prague, Czechoslovakia
- Occupations: Producer, director, writer
- Years active: 1990–present
- Partner: Bernice
- Relatives: Ladislav Jasek (father); Anthea Hamilton (mother); Hugh Ramsay (great uncle)

Richard Jasek (born 1964 or 1965) is a Czechoslovakia-born Australian television producer, writer and director. Jasek was born and raised in Prague until his family fled the communist regime and settled in Brisbane. Jasek chose to become a filmmaker after he discovered his father's camera. He would later enrol at the Australian Film, Television and Radio School. Jasek made a short production for SBS Television and travelled to the United Kingdom to work for The National Film School as a guest lecturer. Upon his return to Australia, Jasek began working in television and he is best known for his work with dramas A Country Practice, City Homicide and McLeod's Daughters. In October 2011, it was announced that Jasek had taken over the role of executive producer of Neighbours.

== Early and personal life ==
Jasek was born in the 1960s in Prague to Ladislav Jasek and Anthea Hamilton. He has a sister called Nicola. His great uncle is the Australian artist Hugh Ramsay. Jasek's father was a concert violinist who often played for The Czech Philharmonic Orchestra, while his mother was a jeweller, from a winemaking family from Adelaide. Jasek's father travelled a lot and the secret police coerced him into becoming a spy for the communist regime. Of this, Jasek said "There was huge emotional pressure to report on conversations with friends and acquaintances, if you did not, then the consequences were dire! It was possible for the regime to close down your career, you could lose your home and also affect other family members. In extreme cases, they would throw you in prison."

When Ladislav could no longer bear working for the regime, he got himself posted to Brisbane and the family were accepted as asylum seekers. Ladislav was granted Australian citizenship in 1966. The family then moved to New Zealand, Britain and eight years later, returned to Australia. During this period, Jasek decided to become a filmmaker having found his father's movie camera. Jasek attended high school at Sydney Boys High School from 1977 to 1982. At Sydney Boys High he was infamous for his oft-repeated joke "why is an arts centre like a blinkered racehorse? (Because you can't see more left, you can't see more right, but you can Seymour Centre)". From the age of eleven, he began making short films with his friends. Jasek later enrolled at the Australian Film Television and Radio School (AFTRS) in Sydney.

Jasek lives with his partner, Bernice, and their Tibetan spaniel called Arabella. He continues his family's love of music by playing classical piano, and has learned to fly light aircraft.

== Career ==
Following his graduation from AFTRS, Jasek made a short production for SBS Television before working there for a time. Jasek also worked in the United Kingdom for The National Film School. Upon his return to Australia, Jasek began working on A Country Practice, which was his first major commercial drama. He then directed many television dramas, including Neighbours, Blue Heelers, Stingers, Heartbreak High, The Secret Life of Us, McLeod's Daughters and Home and Away. Jasek has also worked on various mini series for children, including Pirate Islands. For his work on The Secret Life of Us and Something in the Air, Jasek received two Best Direction in a Television Drama award nominations from the Australian Film Institute.

Following the exit of Maryanne Carroll, Jasek took over the role of producer on City Homicide in 2009. In September 2011, Jasek shot the film The Story of Frank Fenner and his Father Charles, which explores the life and scientific achievements of Professor Frank Fenner. On 25 October 2011, it was announced that Jasek would be taking over as the executive producer of Neighbours, following Susan Bower's decision to move on from the job. Jasek was joined by Alan Hardy, who took over the role of producer. He was responsible for a number of multicultural casting choices during his tenure, including bringing the first non-white family into the core cast of the show, although this resulted in later controversy when the family was written out. On 4 December 2013, it was announced that Jasek was to leave his position as executive producer at Neighbours.

In 2017, he started to make a documentary about the Ramsay Art Prize, a visual arts prize for artists aged under 40 years old. The documentary follows some of the finalists and discovers the stories behind their works. Of the documentary Jasek said "There are so many extraordinarily creative people out there and Australia is giving birth to this fantastic generation of artists. There’s an explosion of creativity going on at the moment. You can see that in the works and the prize".
