= Sheet music =

Full musical score showing each part on a separate line or staff

Hymn-style arrangement of "Adeste Fideles" in standard two-staff format (bass staff and treble staff) for mixed voices

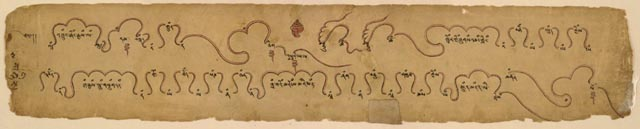
Tibetan musical score from the 19th century

Sheet music is a handwritten or printed form of musical notation that uses musical symbols to indicate the pitches, rhythms, or chords of a song or instrumental musical piece. Like its analogs – printed books or pamphlets in English, Arabic, or other languages – the medium of sheet music typically is paper (or, in earlier centuries, papyrus or parchment). However, access to musical notation since the 1980s has included the presentation of scores on computer screens and the development of scorewriter computer programs that can notate a song or piece electronically, and, in some cases, "play back" the notated music using a synthesizer or virtual instruments.

The use of the term sheet is intended to differentiate written or printed forms of music from sound recordings (on vinyl record, cassette, CD), radio or TV broadcasts or recorded live performances, which may capture film or video footage of the performance as well as the audio component. In everyday use, sheet music (or simply music) can refer to the print publication of commercial sheet music in conjunction with the release of a new film, TV show, record album, or other unique or popular event which involves music. The first printed sheet music made with a printing press was made in 1473.

Sheet music is the basic form in which Western classical music is notated so that it can be learned and performed by solo singers, instrumentalists or musical ensembles. Many forms of traditional and popular Western music are commonly learned by singers and musicians "by ear", rather than by using sheet music (although in many cases, traditional and pop music may also be available in sheet music form).

The term score is a common alternative (and more generic) term for sheet music, and there are several types of scores, as discussed below. The term score can also refer to theatre music, orchestral music or songs written for a play, musical, opera or ballet, or to music or songs written for a television programme or film; for the last of these, see Film score.

== Elements ==
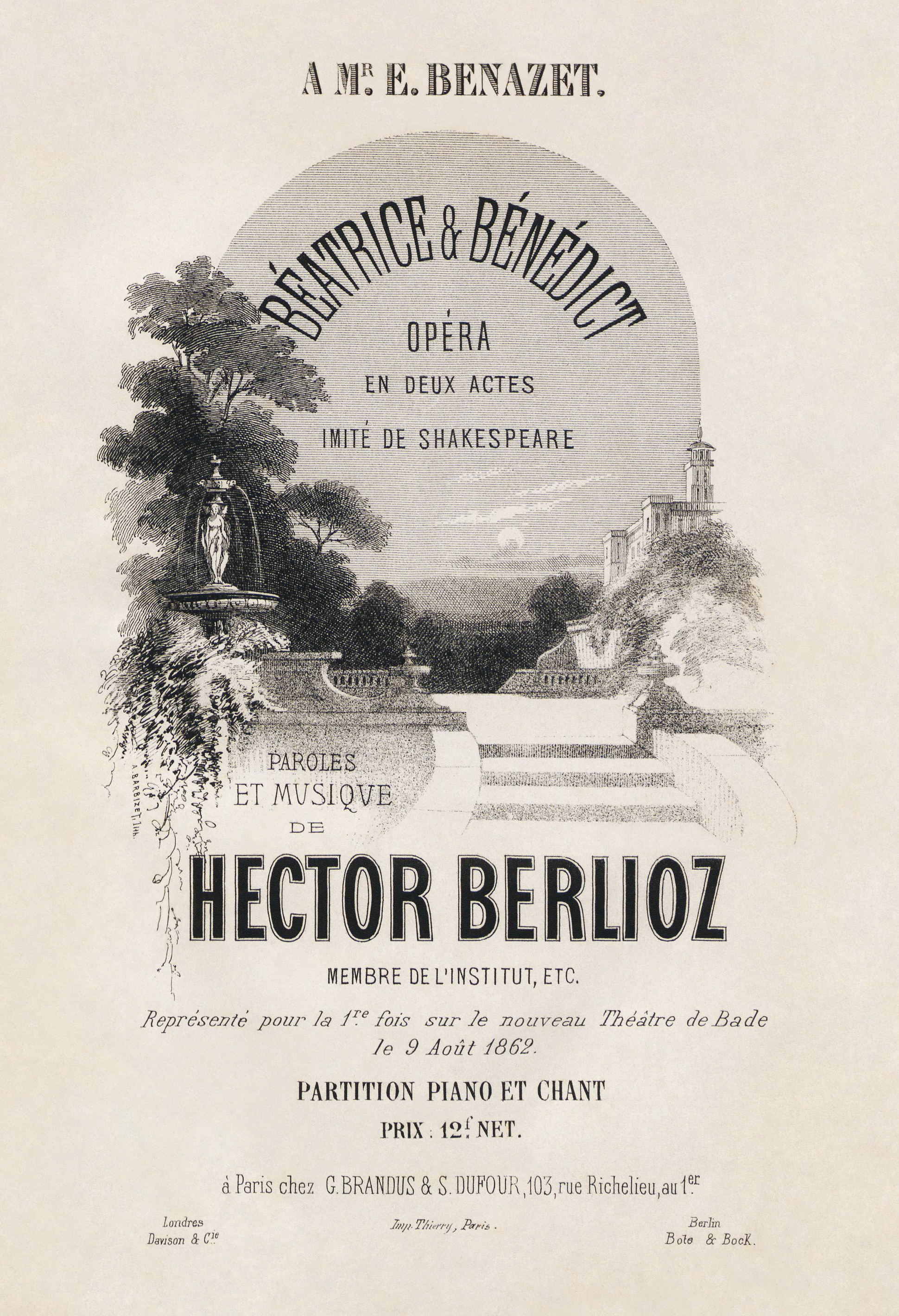
Title page for the first-edition vocal score for Hector Berlioz's Béatrice et Bénédict

=== Title and credit ===
Sheet music from the 20th and 21st century typically indicates the title of the song or composition on a title page, cover, or at the top of the first page when no separate title page exists. If the song or piece is from a movie, Broadway musical, or opera, the title of the main work from which the song/piece is taken may be indicated.

If the songwriter or composer is known, their name is typically indicated along with the title. The sheet music may also indicate the name of the lyric-writer, if the lyrics are by a person other than one of the songwriters or composers. It may also include the name of the arranger, if the song or piece has been arranged for the publication. No songwriter or composer name may be indicated for old folk music, traditional songs in genres such as blues and bluegrass, and very old traditional hymns and spirituals, because for this music, the authors are often unknown; in such cases, the word "traditional" is often placed where the composer's name would ordinarily go.

Title pages for songs may have a picture illustrating the characters, setting, or events from the lyrics. Title pages from instrumental works may omit an illustration, unless the work is program music which has, by its title or section names, associations with a setting, characters, or story.

=== Musical notation ===
The type of musical notation varies a great deal by genre or style of music. In most classical music, the melody and accompaniment parts (if present) are notated on the lines of a staff using round note heads. In classical sheet music, the staff typically contains:

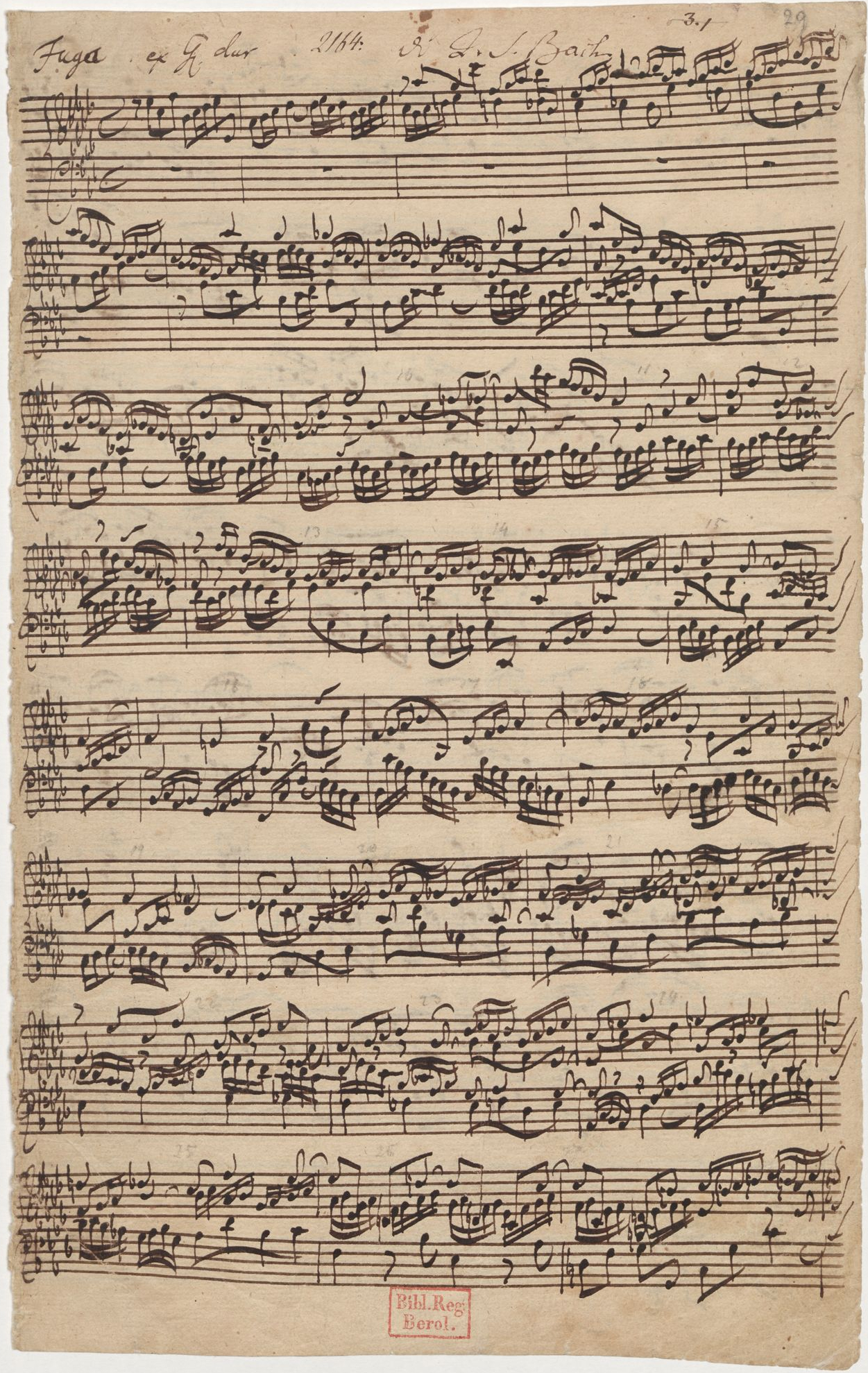
Page from the autograph score of Fugue No. 17 in A♭ major from J. S. Bach's The Well-Tempered Clavier

1. a clef, such as bass clef or treble clef
2. a key signature indicating the key—for instance, a key signature with four flats is typically used for the key of either A♭ major or F minor
3. a time signature, which typically has two numbers aligned vertically with the bottom number indicating the note value that represents one beat and the top number indicating how many beats are in a bar—for instance, a time signature of 4/4 indicates that there are four quarter notes (crotchets) per bar. Some common time signatures are also frequently shown with non-numerical shorthand symbols - (a large C) indicates common time, corresponding to 4/4.

Most songs and pieces from the Classical period (c. 1750) onward indicate the piece's tempo using an expression—often in Italian—such as allegro (fast) or grave (slow) as well as its dynamics (loudness or softness). The lyrics, if present, are written near the melody notes. However, music from the Baroque era (c. 1600–1750) or earlier eras may have neither a tempo marking nor a dynamic indication. The singers and musicians of that era were expected to know what tempo and loudness to play or sing a given song or piece due to their musical experience and knowledge. In the contemporary classical music era (20th and 21st century), and in some cases before (such as the Romantic period in German-speaking regions), composers often used their native language for tempo indications, rather than Italian (e.g., fast or schnell) or added metronome markings (e.g., = 100 beats per minute).

These conventions of classical music notation, and in particular the use of English tempo instructions, are also used for sheet music versions of 20th and 21st century popular music songs. Popular music songs often indicate both the tempo and genre: slow blues or uptempo rock. Pop songs often contain chord names above the staff using letter names (e.g., C Maj, F Maj, G7, etc.), so that an acoustic guitarist or pianist can improvise a chordal accompaniment.

In other styles of music, different musical notation methods may be used. In jazz, for example, while most professional performers can read "classical"-style notation, many jazz tunes are notated using chord charts, which indicate the chord progression of a song (e.g., C, A7, D minor, G7, etc.) and its form. Members of a jazz rhythm section (a piano player, jazz guitarist and bassist) use the chord chart to guide their improvised accompaniment parts, while the lead instruments in a jazz group, such as a saxophone player or trumpeter, use the chord changes to guide their solo improvisation. Like popular music songs, jazz tunes often indicate both the tempo and genre: slow blues or fast bop.

Professional country music session musicians typically use music notated in the Nashville Number System, which indicates the chord progression using numbers (this enables bandleaders to change the key at a moment's notice). Chord charts using letter names, numbers, or Roman numerals (e.g., I–IV–V) are also widely used for notating music by blues, R&B, rock music and heavy metal musicians. Some chord charts do not provide any rhythmic information, but others use slashes to indicate beats of a bar and rhythm notation to indicate syncopated "hits" that the songwriter wants all of the band to play together. Many guitar players and electric bass players learn songs and note tunes using tablature, which is a graphic representation of which frets and strings the performer should play. "Tab" is widely used by rock music and heavy metal guitarists and bassists. Singers in many popular music styles learn a song using only a lyrics sheet, learning the melody and rhythm "by ear" from the recording.

== Purpose and use ==
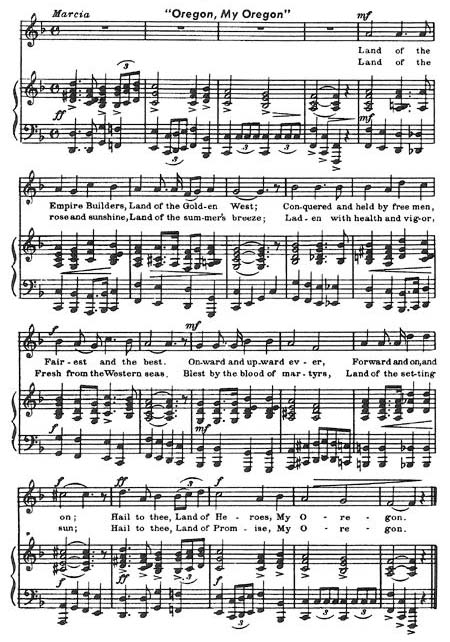
Sheet music for the song "Oregon, My Oregon"

Sheet music can be used as a record of, a guide to, or a means to perform, a song or piece of music. Sheet music enables instrumental performers who are able to read music notation (a pianist, orchestral instrument players, a jazz band, etc.) or singers to perform a song or piece. Music students use sheet music to learn about different styles and genres of music. The intended purpose of an edition of sheet music affects its design and layout. If sheet music is intended for study purposes, as in a music history class, the notes and staff can be made smaller and the editor does not have to be worried about page turns. For a performance score, however, the notes have to be readable from a music stand and the editor has to avoid excessive page turns and ensure that any page turns are placed after a rest or pause (if possible). Also, a score or part in a thick bound book will not stay open, so a performance score or part needs to be in a thinner binding or use a binding format which will lie open on a music stand.

In classical music, authoritative musical information about a piece can be gained by studying the written sketches and early versions of compositions that the composer might have retained, as well as the final autograph score and personal markings on proofs and printed scores.

Comprehending sheet music requires a special form of literacy: the ability to read music notation. An ability to read or write music is not a requirement to compose music. There have been a number of composers and songwriters who have been capable of producing music without the capacity themselves to read or write in musical notation, as long as an amanuensis of some sort is available to write down the melodies they think of. Examples include the blind 18th-century composer John Stanley and the 20th-century songwriters Lionel Bart, Irving Berlin and Paul McCartney. As well, in traditional music styles such as the blues and folk music, there are many prolific songwriters who could not read music, and instead played and sang music "by ear".

The skill of sight reading is the ability of a musician to perform an unfamiliar work of music upon viewing the sheet music for the first time. Sight reading ability is expected of professional musicians and serious amateurs who play classical music, jazz and related forms. An even more refined skill is the ability to look at a new piece of music and hear most or all of the sounds (melodies, harmonies, timbres, etc.) in one's head without having to play the piece or hear it played or sung. Skilled composers and conductors have this ability, with Beethoven being a noted historical example.

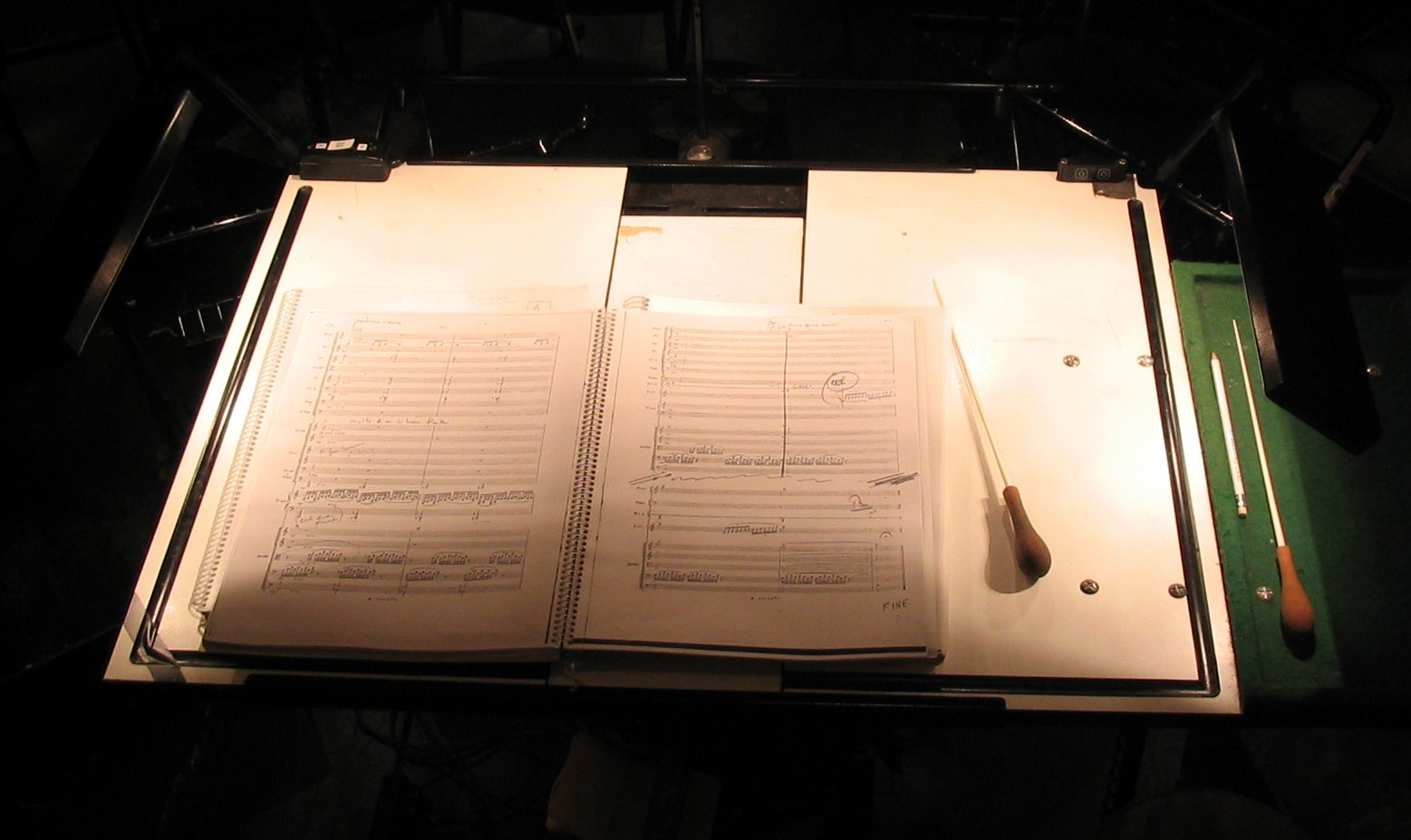
A conductor's score and baton

Classical musicians playing orchestral works, chamber music, sonatas and singing choral works ordinarily have the sheet music in front of them on a music stand when performing (or held in front of them in a music folder, in the case of a choir), with the exception of solo instrumental performances of solo pieces, concertos, or solo vocal pieces (art songs, opera arias, etc.), where memorization is expected. In jazz, which is mostly improvised, sheet music (called a lead sheet in this context) is used to give basic indications of melodies, chord changes, and arrangements. Even when a jazz band has a lead sheet, chord chart or arranged music, many elements of a performance are improvised.

Handwritten or printed music is less important in other traditions of musical practice. However, in genres such as traditional music and folk music, singers and instrumentalists typically learn songs "by ear" or from having a song or tune taught to them by another person. Although much popular music is published in notation of some sort, it is quite common for people to learn a song by ear. This is also the case in most forms of Western folk music, where songs and dances are passed down by oral – and aural – tradition. Music of other cultures, both folk and classical, is often transmitted orally, though some non-Western cultures developed their own forms of musical notation and sheet music as well.

Although sheet music is often thought of as being a platform for new music and an aid to composition (i.e., the composer "writes" the music down), it can also serve as a visual record of music that already exists. Scholars and others have made transcriptions to render Western and non-Western music in readable form for study, analysis and re-creative performance. This has been done not only with folk or traditional music (e.g., Bartók's volumes of Magyar and Romanian folk music), but also with sound recordings of improvisations by musicians (e.g., jazz piano) and performances that may only partially be based on notation. An exhaustive example of the latter in recent times is the collection The Beatles: Complete Scores (London: Wise Publications, 1993), which seeks to transcribe into staves and tablature all the songs as recorded by the Beatles in instrumental and vocal detail.

== Types ==
Modern sheet music may come in different formats. If a piece is composed for just one instrument or voice (such as a piece for a solo instrument or for a cappella solo voice), the whole work may be written or printed as one piece of sheet music. If an instrumental piece is intended to be performed by more than one person, each performer will usually have a separate piece of sheet music, called a part, to play from. This is especially the case in the publication of works requiring more than four performers, though invariably a full score is published as well. The sung parts in a vocal work are not usually issued separately in modern practice, although this was historically the case, especially before music printing made sheet music widely available.

Sheet music can be issued as individual pieces or works (for example, a popular song or a Beethoven sonata), in collections (for example works by one or several composers), as pieces performed by a given artist, etc.

When the separate instrumental and vocal parts of a musical work are printed together, the resulting sheet music is called a score. Conventionally, a score consists of musical notation with each instrumental or vocal part in vertical alignment (meaning that concurrent events in the notation for each part are arranged in parallel). The term score has also been used to refer to sheet music written for only one performer. The distinction between score and part applies when there is more than one part needed for performance.

Scores come in various formats.

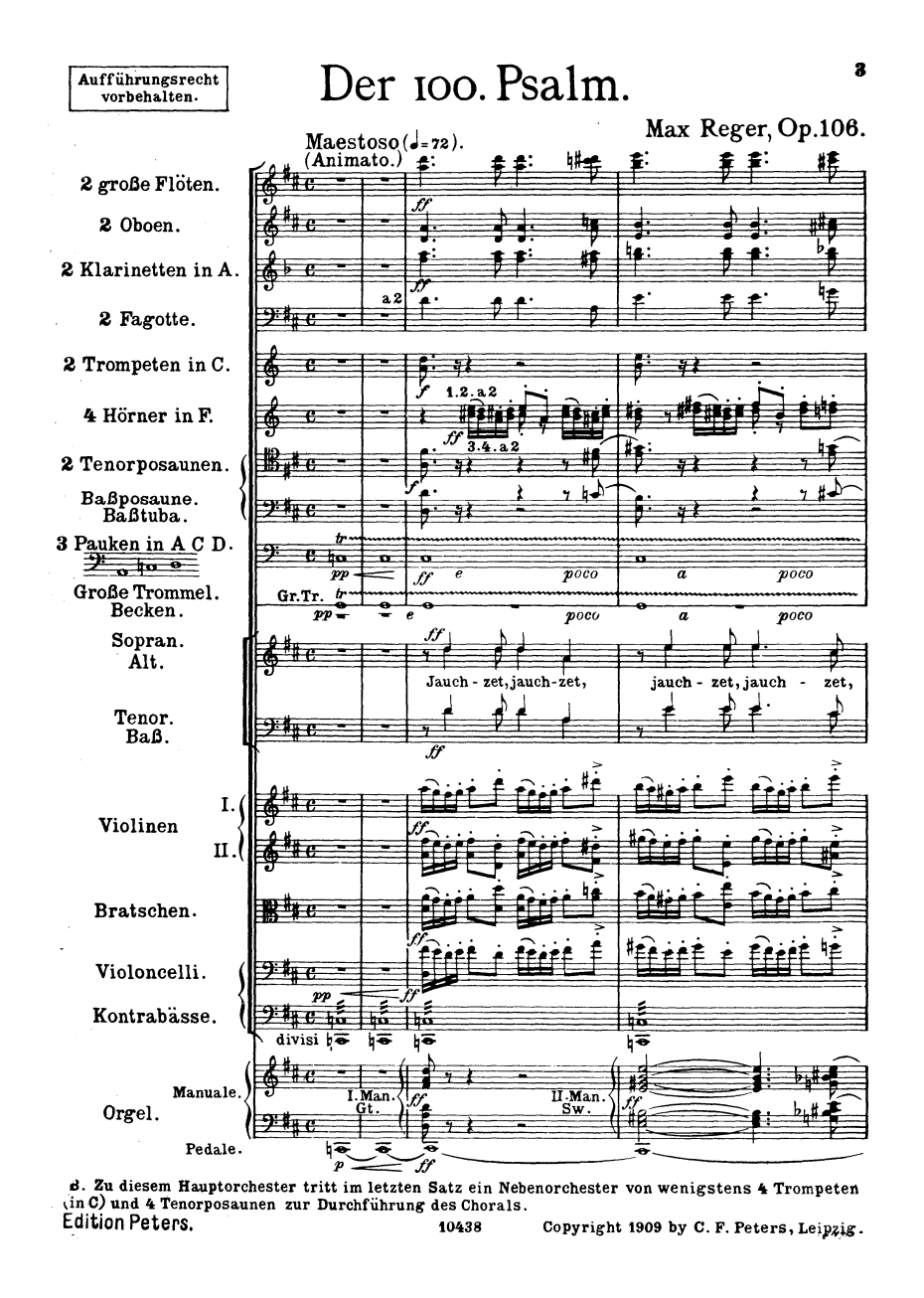
First page of the full score for Max Reger's Der 100. Psalm for choir, orchestra and organ

=== Full scores, variants, and condensations ===
A full score is a large book showing the music of all instruments or voices in a composition lined up in a fixed order. It is large enough for a conductor to be able to read while directing orchestra or opera rehearsals and performances. In addition to their practical use for conductors leading ensembles, full scores are also used by musicologists, music theorists, composers and music students who are studying a given work.

A miniature score is like a full score but much reduced in size. It is too small for use in a performance by a conductor, but handy for studying a piece of music, whether it be for a large ensemble or a solo performer. A miniature score may contain some introductory remarks.

A study score is sometimes the same size as, and often indistinguishable from, a miniature score, except in name. Some study scores are octavo size and are thus somewhere between full and miniature score sizes. A study score, especially when part of an anthology for academic study, may include extra comments about the music and markings for learning purposes.

A piano score (or piano reduction) is a more or less literal transcription for piano of a piece intended for many performing parts, especially orchestral works; this can include purely instrumental sections within large vocal works (see vocal score immediately below). Such arrangements are made for either piano solo (two hands) or piano duet (one or two pianos, four hands). Extra small staves are sometimes added at certain points in piano scores for two hands to make the presentation more complete, though it is usually impractical or impossible to include them while playing.

As with vocal score (below), it takes considerable skill to reduce an orchestral score to such smaller forms because the reduction needs to be not only playable on the keyboard but also thorough enough in its presentation of the intended harmonies, textures, figurations, etc. Markings are sometimes included to show which instruments are playing at given points.

While piano scores are usually not meant for performance outside of study and pleasure (Franz Liszt's concert transcriptions of Beethoven's symphonies being one group of notable exceptions), ballets get the most practical benefit from piano scores because with one or two pianists they allow the ballet to do many rehearsals at a much lower cost, before an orchestra has to be hired for the final rehearsals. Piano scores can also be used to train beginning conductors, who can conduct a pianist playing a piano reduction of a symphony; this is much less costly than conducting a full orchestra. Piano scores of operas do not include separate staves for the vocal parts, but they may add the sung text and stage directions above the music.

A part is an extraction from the full score of a particular instrument. It is used by orchestral players in performance, where the full score would be too cumbersome. However, in practice, it can be a substantial document if the work is lengthy, and a particular instrument is playing for much of its duration.

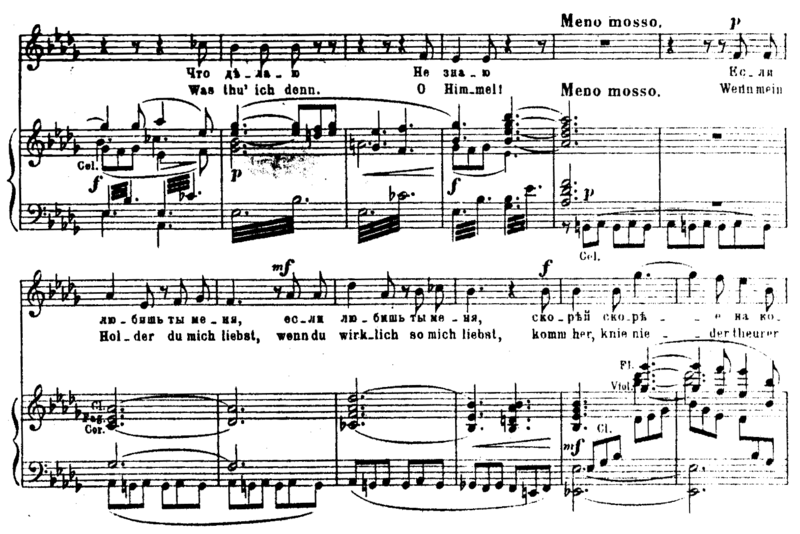
An excerpt of a piano-vocal score for César Cui's opera William Ratcliff.

=== Vocal scores ===
A vocal score (or, more properly, piano-vocal score) is a reduction of the full score of a vocal work (e.g., opera, musical, oratorio, cantata, etc.) to show the vocal parts (solo and choral) on their staves and the orchestral parts in a piano reduction (usually for two hands) underneath the vocal parts; the purely orchestral sections of the score are also reduced for piano. If a portion of the work is a cappella, a piano reduction of the vocal parts is often added to aid in rehearsal (this often is the case with a cappella religious sheet music).

Piano-vocal scores serve as a convenient way for vocal soloists and choristers to learn the music and rehearse separately from the orchestra. The vocal score of a musical typically does not include the spoken dialogue, except for cues. Piano-vocal scores are used to provide piano accompaniment for the performance of operas, musicals and oratorios by amateur groups and some small-scale professional groups. This may be done by a single piano player or by two piano players. With some 2000s-era musicals, keyboardists may play synthesizers instead of piano.

The related but less common choral score contains the choral parts with reduced accompaniment.

The comparable organ score exists as well, usually in association with church music for voices and orchestra, such as arrangements (by later hands) of Handel's Messiah. It is like the piano-vocal score in that it includes staves for the vocal parts and reduces the orchestral parts to be performed by one person. Unlike the vocal score, the organ score is sometimes intended by the arranger to substitute for the orchestra in performance if necessary.

A collection of songs from a given musical is usually printed under the label vocal selections. This is different from the vocal score from the same show in that it does not present the complete music, and the piano accompaniment is usually simplified and includes the melody line.

=== Other types ===
A short score is a reduction of a work for many instruments to just a few staves. Rather than composing directly in full score, many composers work out some type of short score while they are composing and later expand the complete orchestration. An opera, for instance, may be written first in a short score, then in full score, then reduced to a vocal score for rehearsal. Short scores are often not published; they may be more common for some ensembles (e.g., band) than in others. Because of their preliminary nature, short scores are the principal reference point for composers who wish to complete another's unfinished work (e.g. Movements 2 through 5 of Gustav Mahler's 10th Symphony or the third act of Alban Berg's opera Lulu).

An open score is a score of a polyphonic piece showing each voice on a separate staff. In Renaissance or Baroque keyboard pieces, open scores of four staves were sometimes used instead of the more modern convention of one staff per hand. It is also sometimes synonymous with full score (which may have more than one part per staff).

In a close score, all voice parts are represented on the two major staffs (treble and bass staffs).

Scores from the Baroque period (c.1600–1750) are very often in the form of a bass line in the bass clef and the melodies played by instrument or sung on an upper stave (or staves) in the treble clef. The bass line typically had figures written above the bass notes indicating which intervals above the bass (e.g., chords) should be played, an approach called figured bass. The figures indicate which intervals the harpsichordist, pipe organist or lute player should play above each bass note.

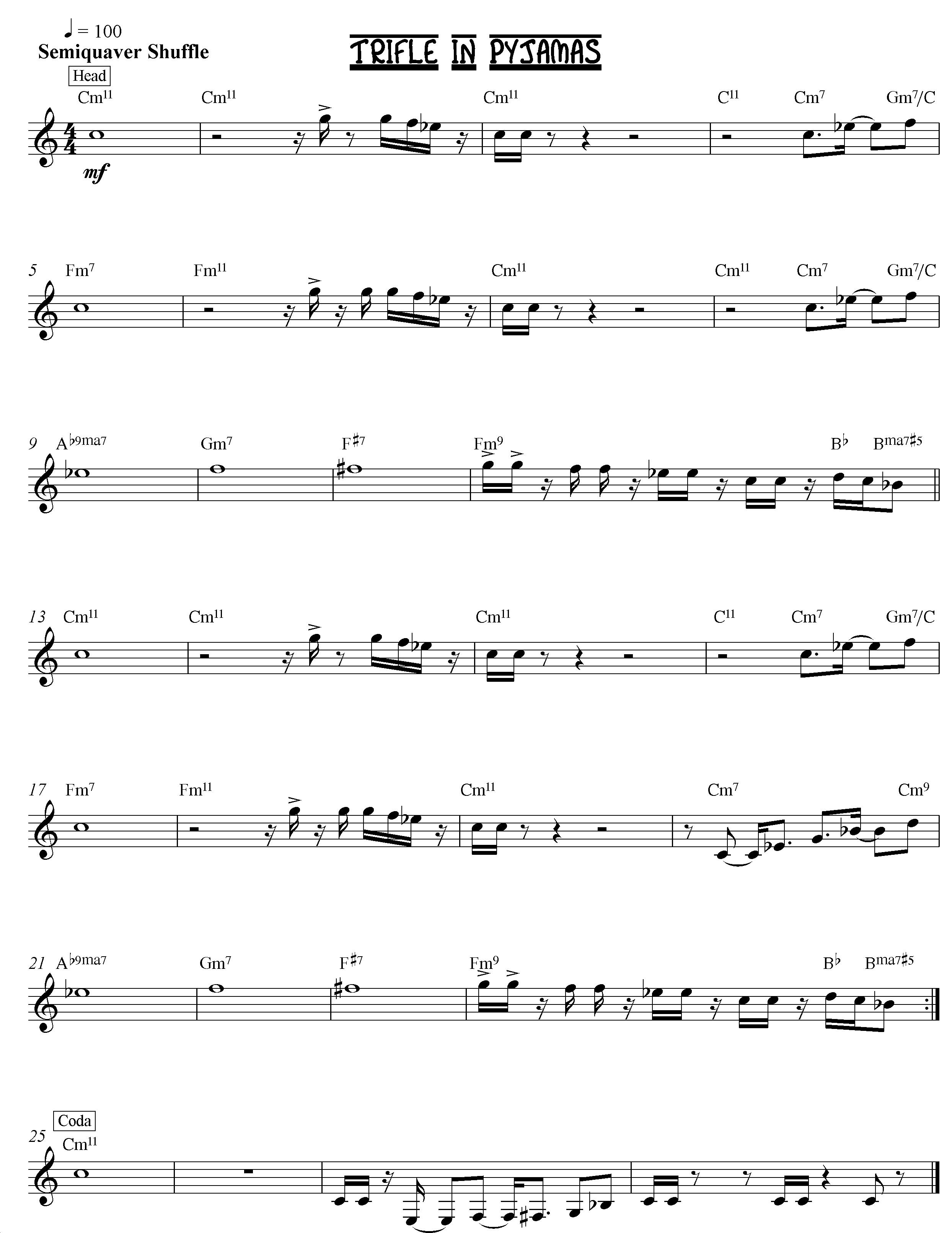
The lead sheet for the song "Trifle in Pyjamas" shows only the melody and chord symbols. To play this song, a jazz band's rhythm section musicians would improvise chord voicings and a bassline using the chord symbols. The lead instruments, such as sax or trumpet, would improvise ornaments to make the melody more interesting, and then improvise a solo part

=== Popular music ===
A lead sheet specifies only the melody, lyrics and harmony, using one staff with chord symbols placed above and lyrics below. It is commonly used in popular music and in jazz to capture the essential elements of song without specifying the details of how the song should be arranged or performed.

A chord chart (or simply, chart) contains little or no melodic information at all but provides fundamental harmonic information. Some chord charts also indicate the rhythm that should be played, particularly if there is a syncopated series of "hits" that the arranger wants all of the rhythm section to perform. Otherwise, chord charts either leave the rhythm blank or indicate slashes for each beat.

This is the most common kind of written music used by professional session musicians playing jazz or other forms of popular music and is intended for the rhythm section (usually containing piano, guitar, bass and drums) to improvise their accompaniment and for any improvising soloists (e.g., saxophone players or trumpet players) to use as a reference point for their extemporized lines.

A fake book is a collection of jazz songs and tunes with just the basic elements of the music provided. There are two types of fake books: (1) collections of lead sheets, which include the melody, chords, and lyrics (if present), and (2) collections of songs and tunes with only the chords. Fake books that contain only the chords are used by rhythm section performers (notably chord-playing musicians such as electric guitarists and piano players and the bassist) to help guide their improvisation of accompaniment parts for the song. Fake books with only the chords can also be used by lead instruments (e.g., saxophone or trumpet) as a guide to their improvised solo performances. Since the melody is not included in chord-only fake books, lead instrument players are expected to know the melody.

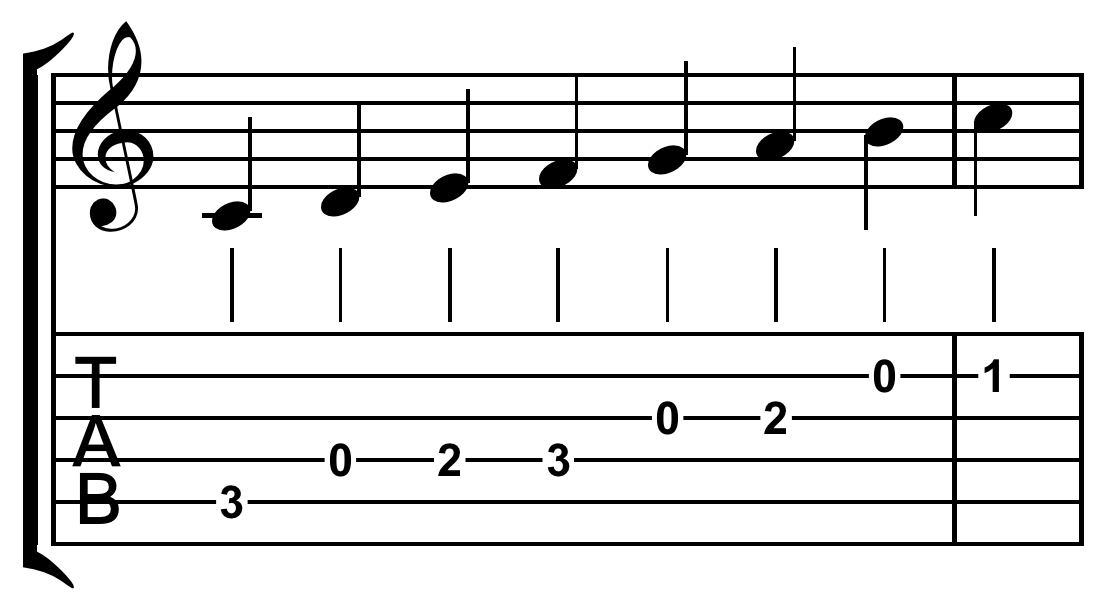
C major scale in regular notation (above) and in tabulature for guitar (below)

A tablature (or tab) is a special type of musical score – most typically for a solo instrument – which shows where to play the pitches on the given instrument rather than which pitches to produce, with rhythm indicated as well. Tablature is widely used for guitar and electric bass songs and pieces in popular music genres such as rock music and heavy metal music. This type of notation was first used in the late Middle Ages, and it has been used for keyboard (e.g., pipe organ) and for fretted string instruments (lute, guitar).

=== Song sheets ===
Song sheets are the printed lyrics without musical notation. Academic studies of American music call these sheets songsters. Broadside song sheets, often of popular ballads, were sold in New England in the early nineteenth century and sold for a penny. Over the first half of the 20th century, lyrics to songs were printed and sold individually, in collections on newspaper-sized sheets, combined into booklets, and in magazines. Song sheets typically included photographs of famous entertainers associated with the song, as well as attributions to musical theater and films.

Song sheets were recognized as competition to sheet music by the American Society of Composers, Authors and Publishers (ASCAP) in 1930, when a representative said, "Thousands now learn the popular melodies from the radio, the publishers state. With the lyrics available for five or ten cents and the strain known, impulse to buy sheet music is eliminated." While sheet music for a song might cost thirty or thirty-five cents, a song sheet typically sold for a nickel or a dime. Choral societies would buy a single copy of the sheet music for the pianist and then multiple song sheets for the singers.

When the lyrics are printed without permission from the copyright owner, the song sheets are called bootleg song sheets. Song-sheet bootlegging was seen as a minor problem in Chicago in the early 1890s, but became a significant issue from 1929 through the 1930s. The first publishers and distributors of bootleg song sheets were charged with criminal copyright infringement in February, 1930. Through the efforts of the Music Publishers' Protective Association and law enforcement, as well as the advent of legal song sheet magazines, song-sheet bootlegging ended in the early 1940s.

The first legitimate song sheet magazines began in 1934, and Lyle Engel's Song Hits which was first published in 1937 was successful for decades. Song sheet magazines included advertisements, gossip columns, record reviews, and promotional biographies of celebrities.

== History ==
=== Precursors to sheet music ===
Musical notation was developed before parchment or paper were used for writing. The earliest form of musical notation can be found in a cuneiform tablet that was created at Nippur, in Sumer (today's Iraq), in about 2000 BC. The tablet represents fragmentary instructions for performing music, showing it was composed in harmonies of thirds using a diatonic scale.

A tablet from about 1250 BC shows a more developed form of notation. Although the interpretation of the notation system is still controversial, it is clear that the notation indicates the names of strings on a lyre, the tuning of which is described in other tablets. Although they are fragmentary, these tablets represent the earliest notated melodies found anywhere in the world.

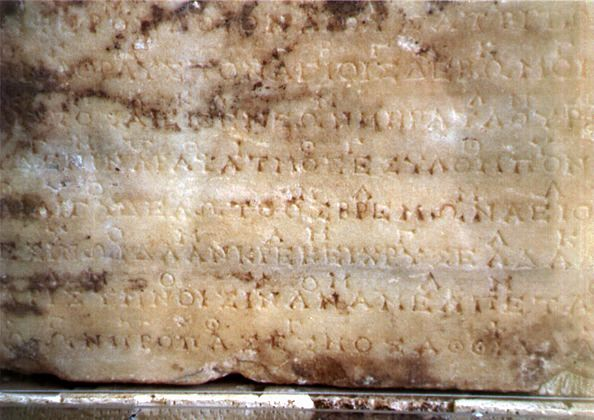
The original stone at Delphi containing the second of the two Delphic Hymns to Apollo. The music notation is the line of occasional symbols above the main, uninterrupted line of Greek lettering.

Ancient Greek musical notation was in use from at least the 6th century BC until approximately the 4th century AD; several complete compositions and fragments of compositions using this notation survive. The notation consists of symbols placed above text syllables. An example of a complete composition is the Seikilos epitaph, which has been variously dated between the 2nd century BC to the 1st century AD.

In ancient Greek music, three hymns by Mesomedes of Crete exist in manuscript. One of the oldest known examples of music notation is a papyrus fragment of the Hellenic era play Orestes (408 BC), which contains musical notation for a choral ode. Ancient Greek notation appears to have fallen out of use around the time of the decline of the Roman Empire.

=== Western manuscript notation ===
Before the 15th century, Western music was written by hand and preserved in manuscripts, usually bound in large volumes. The best-known examples of Middle Ages music notation are medieval manuscripts of monophonic chant. Chant notation indicated the notes of the chant melody, but without any indication of the rhythm. In the case of Medieval polyphony, such as the motet, the parts were written in separate portions of facing pages. This process was aided by the advent of mensural notation, which also indicated the rhythm and was paralleled by the medieval practice of composing parts of polyphony sequentially, rather than simultaneously (as in later times). Manuscripts showing parts together in score format were rare and limited mostly to organum, especially that of the Notre Dame school. During the Middle Ages, if an Abbess wanted to have a copy of an existing composition, such as a composition owned by an Abbess in another town, she would have to hire a copyist to do the task by hand, which would be a lengthy process and one that could lead to transcription errors.

Even after the advent of music printing in the mid-1400s, much music continued to exist solely in composers' hand-written manuscripts well into the 18th century.

=== Printing ===
==== 15th century ====
There were several difficulties in translating the new printing press technology to music. In the first printed book to include music, the Mainz Psalter (1457), the music notation (both staff lines and notes) was added in by hand. This is similar to the room left in other incunabula for capitals. The psalter was printed in Mainz, Germany, by Johann Fust and Peter Schöffer, and one now resides in Windsor Castle and another at the British Library. Later, staff lines were printed, but scribes still added in the rest of the music by hand. The greatest difficulty in using movable type to print music is that all the elements must line up – the note head must be properly aligned with the staff. In vocal music, text must be aligned with the proper notes (although at this time, even in manuscripts, this was not a high priority).

Music engraving is the art of drawing music notation at high quality for the purpose of mechanical reproduction. The first machine-printed music appeared around 1473, approximately 20 years after Gutenberg introduced the printing press. In 1501, Ottaviano Petrucci published Harmonice Musices Odhecaton A, which contained 96 pieces of printed music. Petrucci's printing method produced clean, readable, elegant music, but it was a long, difficult process that required three separate passes through the printing press. Petrucci later developed a process which required only two passes through the press. But it was still taxing since each pass required very precise alignment for the result to be legible (i.e., so that the note heads would be correctly lined up with the staff lines). This was the first well-distributed printed polyphonic music. Petrucci also printed the first tablature with movable type. Single impression printing, in which the staff lines and notes could be printed in one pass, first appeared in London around 1520. Pierre Attaingnant brought the technique into wide use in 1528, and it remained little changed for 200 years.

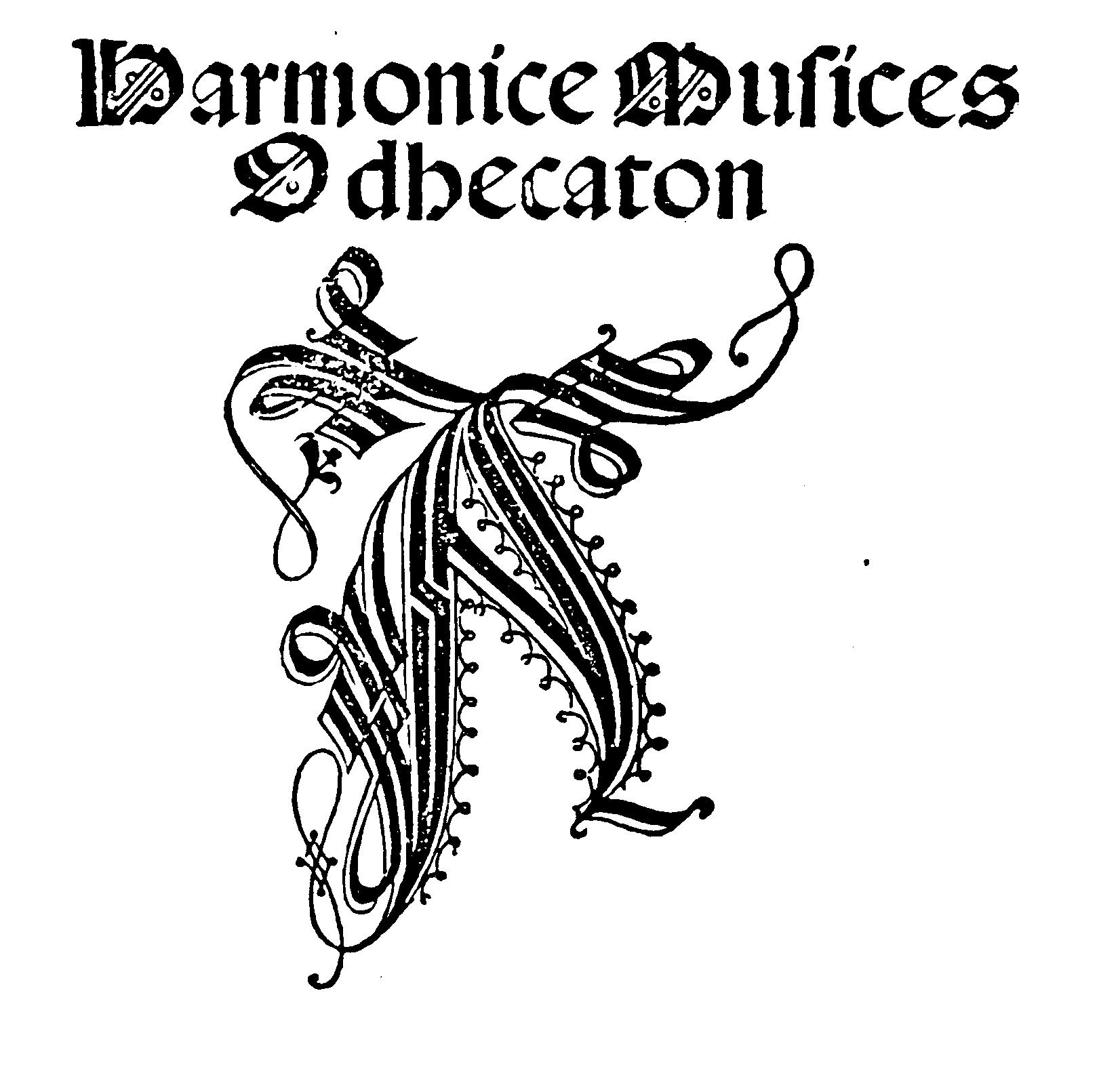
Frontispiece to Petrucci's Odhecaton or Harmonice Musices Odhecaton

A common format for issuing multi-part, polyphonic music during the Renaissance was partbooks. In this format, each voice-part for a collection of five-part madrigals, for instance, would be printed separately in its own book, such that all five partbooks would be needed to perform the music. The same partbooks could be used by singers or instrumentalists. Scores for multi-part music were rarely printed in the Renaissance, although the use of score format as a means to compose parts simultaneously (rather than successively, as in the late Middle Ages) is credited to Josquin des Prez, a composer of high-renaissance music.

The effect of printed music was similar to the effect of the printed word, in that information spread faster, more efficiently, at a lower cost, and to more people than it could through laboriously hand-copied manuscripts. It had the additional effect of encouraging amateur musicians of sufficient means, who could now afford sheet music, to perform. This in many ways affected the entire music industry. Composers could now write more music for amateur performers, knowing that it could be distributed and sold to the middle class.

This meant that composers did not have to depend solely on the patronage of wealthy aristocrats. Professional players could have more music at their disposal and they could access music from different countries. It increased the number of amateurs, allowing professional players to earn money by teaching them. Nevertheless, in the early years, the cost of printed music limited its distribution. Another factor that limited the impact of printed music was that in many places, the right to print music was granted by the monarch, and only those with a special dispensation were allowed to do so, giving them a monopoly. This was often an honour (and economic boon) granted to favoured court musicians or composers.

==== 16th century ====
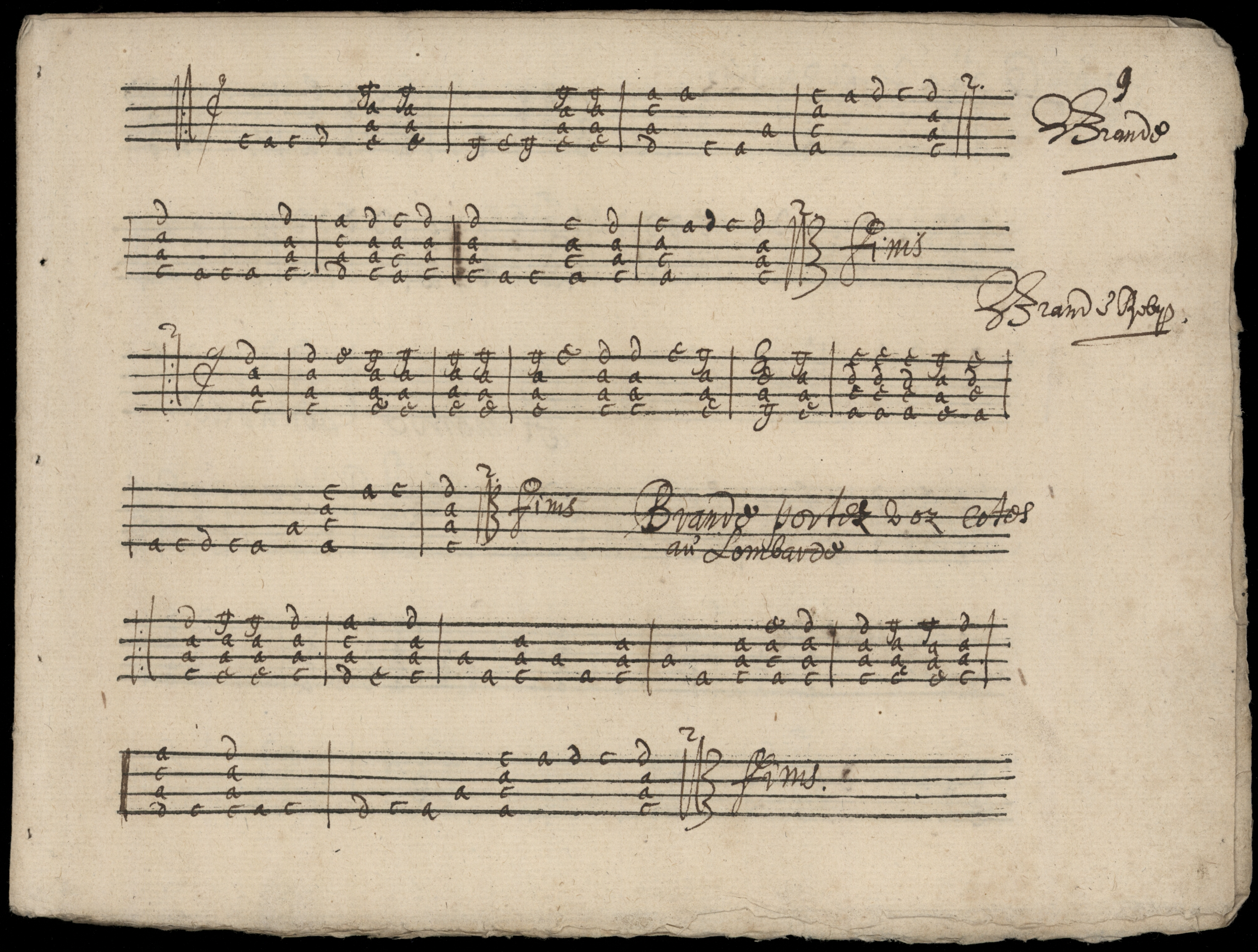
Example of 16th century handwritten sheet music and music notation. Excerpt from the manuscript "Muziek voor 4 korige diatonische cister".

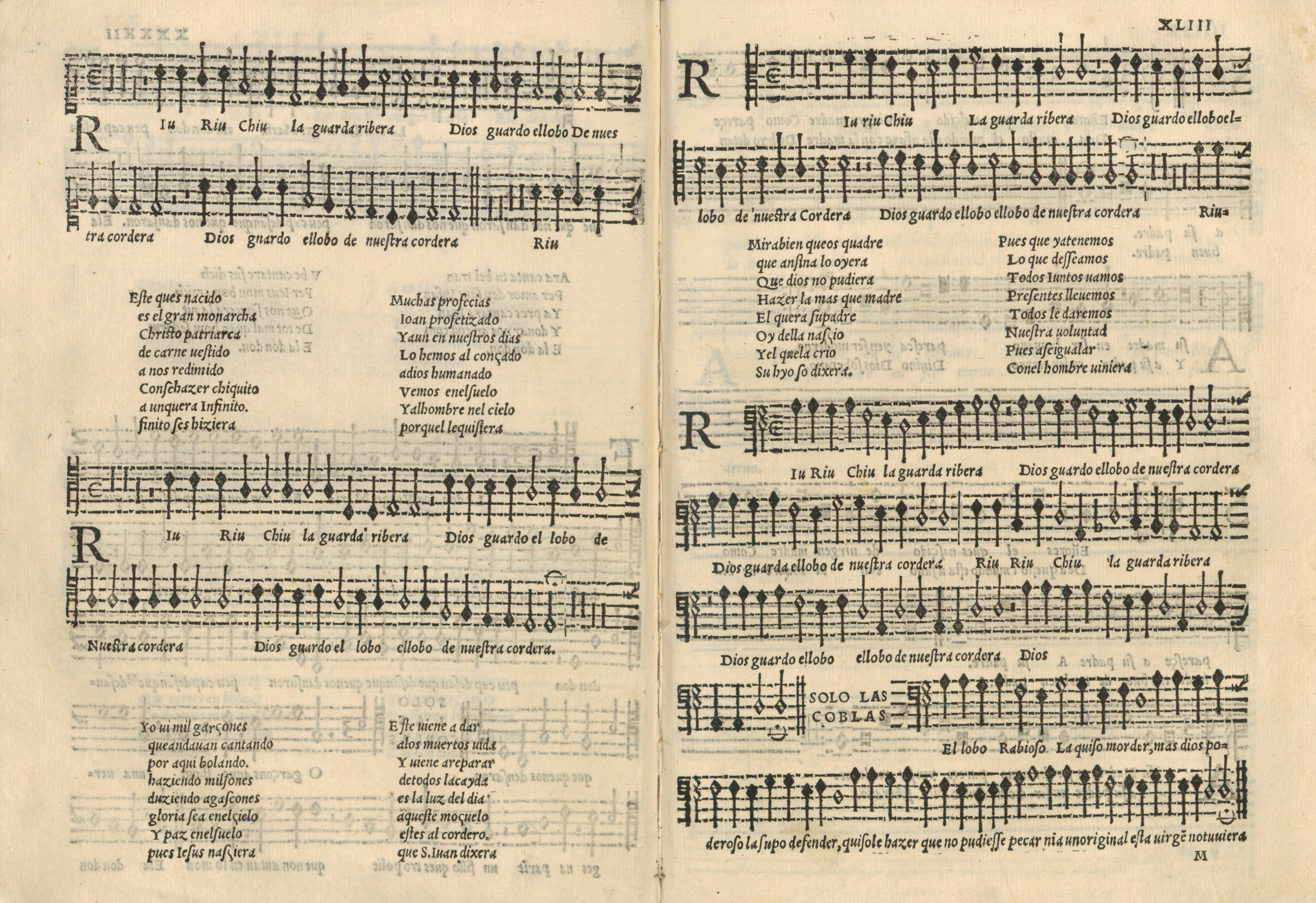
The musical score of Ríu Ríu Chíu printed 1556 in Venice by Girolamo Scotto.

Mechanical plate engraving was developed in the late sixteenth century. Although plate engraving had been used since the early fifteenth century for creating visual art and maps, it was not applied to music until 1581. In this method, a mirror image of a complete page of music was engraved onto a metal plate. Ink was then applied to the grooves, and the music print was transferred onto paper. Metal plates could be stored and reused, which made this method an attractive option for music engravers. Copper was the initial metal of choice for early plates, but by the eighteenth century, pewter became the standard material due to its malleability and lower cost.

Plate engraving was the methodology of choice for music printing until the late nineteenth century, at which point its decline was hastened by the development of photographic technology. Nevertheless, the technique has survived to the present day and is still occasionally used by select publishers such as G. Henle Verlag in Germany.

As musical composition increased in complexity, so too did the technology required to produce accurate musical scores. Unlike literary printing, which mainly contains printed words, music engraving communicates several different types of information simultaneously. To be clear to musicians, it is imperative that engraving techniques allow absolute precision. Notes of chords, dynamic markings, and other notation line up with vertical accuracy. If text is included, each syllable matches vertically with its assigned melody. Horizontally, subdivisions of beats are marked not only by their flags and beams, but also by the relative space between them on the page. The logistics of creating such precise copies posed several problems for early music engravers, and have resulted in the development of several music engraving technologies.

==== 19th century ====
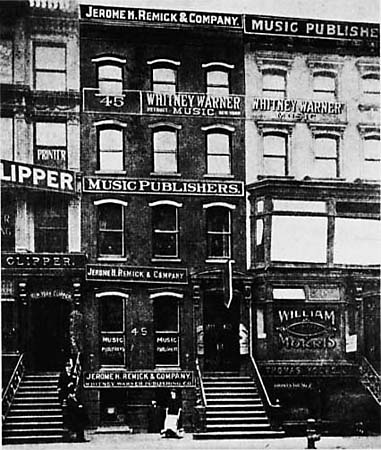
Buildings of New York City's Tin Pan Alley music publishing district in 1910.

In the 19th century, the music industry was dominated by sheet music publishers. In the mid-century, copyright control of melodies was not strict, and publishers would often print their own versions of the songs popular at the time. Some composers, such as J.N. Pattison, countered by publishing their own sheet music. Pattison operated out of a piano and organ salesroom in Union Square in downtown Manhattan. After 1885, New York music publishing was dominated by a group of songwriters and composers known as Tin Pan Alley. With stronger copyright protection laws late in the century, songwriters, composers, lyricists, and publishers started working together for their mutual financial benefit. New York City publishers concentrated on vocal music. The biggest music houses established themselves in New York City, but small local publishers – often connected with commercial printers or music stores – continued to flourish throughout the country. An extraordinary number of East European immigrants became music publishers and songwriters on Tin Pan Alley—the most famous being Irving Berlin. Songwriters who became established producers of successful songs were hired to be on the staff of the music houses.

In the United States, the sheet music industry rose in tandem with blackface minstrelsy, as well as parlour music. The late-19th century saw a massive explosion of parlour music, with ownership of, and skill at playing the piano becoming de rigueur for the middle-class family. In the late-19th century, if a middle-class family wanted to hear a popular new song or piece, they would buy the sheet music and then perform the song or piece in an amateur fashion in their home. But in the early 20th century the phonograph and recorded music grew greatly in importance. This, joined by the growth in popularity of radio broadcasting from the 1920s on, lessened the importance of the sheet music publishers. The record industry eventually replaced the sheet music publishers as the music industry's largest force.

==== 20th century and early 21st century ====
In the late 20th and into the 21st century, significant interest has developed in representing sheet music in a computer-readable format (see music notation software), as well as downloadable files. Music OCR, software to "read" scanned sheet music so that the results can be manipulated, has been available since 1991.

In 1998, virtual sheet music evolved further into what was to be termed digital sheet music, which for the first time allowed publishers to make copyright sheet music available for purchase online. Unlike their hard copy counterparts, these files allowed for manipulation such as instrument changes, transposition and MIDI (Musical Instrument Digital Interface) playback. The popularity of this instant delivery system among musicians has catalyzed new industry growth since the late 1990s.

An early computer notation program available for home computers was Music Construction Set, developed in 1984 and released for several different platforms. Introducing concepts largely unknown to the home user of the time, it allowed manipulation of notes and symbols with a pointing device such as a mouse; the user would "grab" a note or symbol from a palette and "drop" it onto the staff in the correct location. The program allowed playback of the produced music through various early sound cards, and could print the musical score on a graphics printer.

Boccherini (opus 54), e-sheet music (2026)

By 1999, a system and method for coordinating music display among players in an orchestra was patented by Harry Connick Jr. It is a device with a computer screen which is used to show the sheet music for the musicians in an orchestra instead of the more commonly used paper. Connick uses this system when touring with his big band, for instance. With the proliferation of wireless networks and iPads, similar systems have been developed. In the classical music world, some string quartet groups use computer screen-based parts. There are several advantages to computer-based parts. Since the score is on a computer screen, the user can adjust the contrast, brightness and even the size of the notes to make reading easier. In addition, some systems will do "page turns" using a foot pedal, which means that the performer does not have to miss playing music during a page turn, as often occurs with paper parts.

Of special practical interest for the general public is the Mutopia Project, an effort to create a library of public domain sheet music, comparable to Project Gutenberg's library of public domain books. The International Music Score Library Project (IMSLP) is also attempting to create a virtual library containing all public domain musical scores, as well as scores from composers who are willing to share their music with the world free of charge.

===== Scorewriters =====
A scorewriter (or music notation program) is software for creating, editing and printing sheet music. A scorewriter is to music notation what a word processor is to text, in that they typically provide flexible editing and automatic layout, and produce good-quality printed results.

Many software products for modern digital audio workstations – as well as general personal computers using scorewriter software – enable generation of sheet music from MIDI files, either by a performer playing the notes on a MIDI-equipped keyboard or other MIDI controller, or by manual entry using a mouse or other computer device.

Some scorewriter programs have a feature that is very useful for composers and arrangers: the ability to "play back" the notated music using synthesizer sounds or virtual instruments. Before computer programs becama available, the high cost of hiring a full symphony orchestra meant that many composers and arrangers could only hear their orchestral works by arranging them for piano, organ or string quartet. While a scorewiter program's playback lacks the nuances of a professional orchestra recording, it still conveys the piece's tone of colors and instrumental interplay.

== See also ==
- Choirbook – Large format music book for use by multiple singers, used for choral music during the Middle Ages and Renaissance
- Eye movement in music reading – Role of the eyes in reading music
- List of best-selling sheet music
- List of Online Digital Musical Document Libraries
- Manuscript paper – Paper preprinted with musical staves
- Music stand – A device that holds sheet music in position
- Musical notation – Visual representation of music
- Partbook – Book with music for just one of the voices – Common during the Renaissance and Baroque
- Shorthand for orchestra instrumentation – Notation for orchestra instrumentation
