= Ray Walker (singer) =

American retired singer (born 1934)

- Born: March 16, 1934 (age 92); Centerville, Mississippi, U.S.
- Genres: Gospel, country, rock and roll, folk
- Occupations: Singer, church minister
- Instrument: Bass vocals
- Years active: 1958–present
- Labels: Capitol, RCA Victor, Decca
- Formerly of: The Jordanaires
- Spouse: Marilyn DuFresne (m. 1954)

Ray Walker (born March 16, 1934) is a former member of the singing group the Jordanaires. Walker was the bass singer for the group from 1958 until the group split in 2013. During his tenure with the Jordanaires, the group was inducted into the Country Music Hall of Fame, the NACMAI (North American Country Music Association International) Hall of Fame, the Gospel Music Hall of Fame, Rockabilly Hall of Fame, and the Vocal Group Hall of Fame. Walker was also awarded the "Avalon Award," the highest award given for contribution and accomplishment by his alma mater, David Lipscomb University, in 2005.

== Career ==
During the early 1960s, Walker, Neal Matthews, Hoyt Hawkins, and Gordon Stoker helped mold the genre of country music known as "The Nashville Sound", singing backup harmonies to such artists as Patsy Cline and Jim Reeves.

Also known for his solo recordings, Walker has helped in the development of albums and CDs of a cappella composition performed by, among others, the Freed-Hardeman University Singers and the Harding University Choir. For years, Walker served as song director for "The Amazing Grace" bible program, produced by the Madison Church of Christ in the Nashville suburb. He has over 600 a cappella worship songs recorded, reportedly being heard in 77 nations. Walker has been recorded nearly every week since he was 13 years old. He began singing in public at 6 years old. In the 1960s, 1970s, 1980s and 1990s, he was sometimes recorded on 200 songs a week, as aids in church worship in spirit and truth series. Up to 2006, it is estimated that Walker has been recorded on more than 200,000 songs (including repeats for different services and classes), outside of his professional recording with the Jordanaires, and it is possible that he is the most recorded voice in the history of music over his 66 years of performing and teaching. The Jordanaires also backed up Elvis Presley for 15 years beginning in 1956 until he started doing two shows a night in Las Vegas.

Walker is currently one of the ministers of the Waverly Church of Christ in Waverly, Tennessee.

== Family and life today ==
In September 1954, Walker married Marilyn DuFresne. The couple have six children, fifteen grandchildren, and thirteen great-grandchildren.

As of 2019, Walker continues to perform as a solo artist; with the death of Gordon Stoker in 2013 and the Jordainaires' dissolution, Walker is the last surviving member of the group's classic lineup. The group, occasionally, performed with country crooner Ronnie McDowell in programs dedicated to the memory of Elvis Presley, as well as, other tribute artists in honor of Elvis. Ray also continues to lead singing at various congregations of the Churches of Christ.

As of 2011, Walker is called in about once per month on Sirius/XM satellite radio, chatting with longtime disc jockey and Elvis friend George Klein. Walker's most recent interview came in April 2016, with topics ranging from how he joined the Jordanaires, Elvis working in the recording studio, Elvis' first encounter with Priscilla, and the time singer/guitarist Jerry Reed sat in with Elvis.
