= CRD =

CRD or crd may refer to:

== Documents ==
- EU Capital Requirements Directive, for financial services
- Central Registration Depository, of US securities industry

== Organizations ==
- Capital Regional District, in British Columbia, Canada
- Cariboo Regional District, in British Columbia, Canada
- Central Research Department of E. I. du Pont de Nemours
- Centre for Reviews and Dissemination, health research institute, York University
- Conservative Research Department of UK Conservative Party
- CRD Records

== Science and technology ==
- Chord (geometry)
- .crd, ChordPro filename extension
- Chrome Remote Desktop
- Common Rail Diesel
- Completely randomized design
- Custom Resource Definition, a concept from Kubernetes

== Transport ==
- Air Corridor, Mozambique airline, ICAO airline designator
- Chester Road railway station, West Midlands, England, National Rail station code
- General Enrique Mosconi International Airport, Comodoro Rivadavia, Argentina, IATA code

== Other uses ==
- Concussion reduction device, for a firearm
- ISO 639-3 code for the Coeur d'Alene/snchitsu’umshtsn language
- CRD (film)
- Courtroom deputy, a deputy court clerk
