= Lead sheet =

Musical score describing the essential elements of a song

A lead sheet

The Wikipedia Song
(as five-second commercial television cue)

A lead sheet or fake sheet is a form of musical notation that specifies the essential elements of a popular song: the melody, lyrics and harmony. The melody is written in modern Western music notation, the lyric is written as text below the staff and the harmony is specified with chord symbols above the staff. This is in contrast to a full score, in which every note to be played in a piece is written out.

The lead sheet does not describe the chord voicings, voice leading, bass line or other aspects of the accompaniment. These are specified later by an arranger or improvised by the performers, and are considered aspects of the arrangement or performance of a song, rather than a part of the song itself. "Lead" refers to a song's lead part, the most important melody line or voice.

A lead sheet may also specify an instrumental part or theme, if this is considered essential to the song's identity. For example, the opening guitar riff from Deep Purple's "Smoke on the Water" is a part of the song; any performance of the song should include the guitar riff, and any imitation of that guitar riff is an imitation of the song. Thus the riff belongs on the lead sheet.

A collected volume of lead sheets may be known as a fake book, due to the improvisational nature of its use: when presented with a lead sheet, proficient musicians may be able to "fake it" by performing the song adequately without a full score. Since fake books and lead sheets only give a rough outline of the melody and harmony, the performer or arranger is expected to improvise significantly.

== Use in performance ==
A lead sheet is often the only form of written music used by a small jazz ensemble. One or more musicians will play the melody while the rest of the group improvises an appropriate accompaniment based on the chord progression given in the chord symbols, followed by an improvised solo also based on the chord progression. Similarly, a sufficiently skilled harmony player (e.g. a jazz pianist or a jazz guitarist) is able to accompany a singer or perform a song by themselves using only a lead sheet.

Lead sheets are not intended for novices. Sometimes, melodies with syncopation are written with the syncopation omitted, so the reader must be familiar with the songs "by ear" to play the melodies correctly. Some 32 bar forms do not have a printed melody during the "B" section, as the lead instrumentalist is expected to improvise one. Similarly, the chord progressions for some blues tunes omit the turnaround (often simply indicating two bars on the tonic), as it is expected that an experienced jazz player will know the appropriate turnarounds to insert (e.g., (I–VI^{7}–ii–V^{7}). The reader needs to have thorough familiarity with extended chords (e.g., C^{13}) and altered chords (e.g., C^{7♯11}). Introductions and codas are often omitted, as it is expected that players will know the familiar intros and codas used on specific songs. Lead sheets are often bound together in a fake book.

=== Chord chart ===
Sheets containing only the chord progressions to the song are often called chord charts or chord sheets, to distinguish them from lead sheets. These sheets could be used by the rhythm section instruments to guide their improvised accompaniment and by lead instruments for their improvised solo sections, but since they do not contain the melody, they can be used in performances only by players who have the melodies memorized. Chord charts are commonly used at informal "jam sessions" and at jazz shows at small nightclubs and bars.

== As legal definition of a song ==
The melody, lyrics, and harmony define what a song is. In the music industry and entertainment law, a lead sheet is the document used to describe a song for legal purposes. For example, a lead sheet is the form of a song to which copyright is applied—if a songwriter sues someone for copyright violation, the court will compare lead sheets to determine how much of the song has been copied. If a song is considered for an Academy Award or a Grammy, the song is submitted for consideration in the form of a lead sheet.

== History ==
A predecessor to lead sheets was created in May 1942 when George Goodwin, a radio station director, released the first Tune-Dex cards. Printing on 3-by-5-inch (7.6 by 12.7 cm) index cards that had the same size as library catalog cards, Goodwin provided lyrics, melody and chord symbols as well as copyright information. Goodwin also promoted the cards to professional musicians until 1963, when poor health forced his retirement. For many years the "standard" fake books were called simply "Fake Books". All were composed of songs unlawfully printed, with no royalties paid to the copyright owners. In 1964, the FBI's Cleveland, Ohio, office observed that "practically every professional musician in the country owns at least one of these fake music books as they constitute probably the single most useful document available".

The first two volumes, Fake Book Volume 1 and Fake Book Volume 2, issued in the late 1940s and 1950s, together comprised about 2000 songs dating from the turn of the 20th century through the late 1950s. In the 1950s the Modern Jazz Fake Book, Volumes 1 and 2 was issued, and Fake Book Volume 3, containing about 500 songs, came out in 1961. The music in Fake Books 1, 2, and 3 was photocopied or reset with a musical typewriter from the melody lines of the original sheet music. Usually chord symbols, titles, composer names, and lyrics were typewritten, but for a number of songs these were all photocopied along with the melody line.

The three Fake Books were well indexed, alphabetically as well as by musical genre and Broadway show. Although the tunes in the Fake Books were compiled illegally, the creators printed copyright information under every song — perhaps to give the false impression that the Fake Books were legal, or to show respect for the creators. The Modern Jazz Fake Book was divided into two sections, each indexed separately as Volume One and Volume Two. The music was transcribed by hand from recordings, and each transcription included performer name, record label, and catalog number. Unlike today's fake and "real" books that have "jazz" in their titles, the Modern Jazz Fake Book included no standards, but only original tunes written and recorded by jazz musicians. All these books have been long out of print, though music students have photocopied the books from other musicians. Fake books originally infringed copyrights, and their circulation was primarily underground.

During the school year of 1974–75, an unidentified group of musicians based at the Berklee College of Music in Boston published the Real Book. Bass guitarist Steve Swallow, who was teaching at Berklee at that time, said the students who edited the book intended "to make a book that contained a hipper repertoire, more contemporary repertoire". It was popular and in its turn spawned a number of "fake Real Books". Swallow's 1994 album Real Book features his original compositions, but the cover art mimics a spiral-bound, coffee-stained fake book used by jazz musicians.

In the 2000s, some types of "real books" have been published which fully respect copyright laws. In the same period, some electronic "fake books" became available, which offer instant transposition. This facilitates the performance of music at shows where some performers have transposing instruments, or in shows with a singer who wants the band to play in a different key to accommodate their vocal range.

== See also ==
- Chas. H. Hansen Music Corp., pioneer publisher of legitimate fake books
- Chord chart
- Chord letters and Roman numeral analysis
- The Fiddler's Fakebook
- Head (music)
- Jazz standard
- Ralph Patt, author of The Vanilla Book of 400 chord progressions for jazz standards
- Real Book
- Rise Up Singing
