= The Jordanaires =

1948–2013 American vocal group; back-up singers for Elvis Presley and other artists

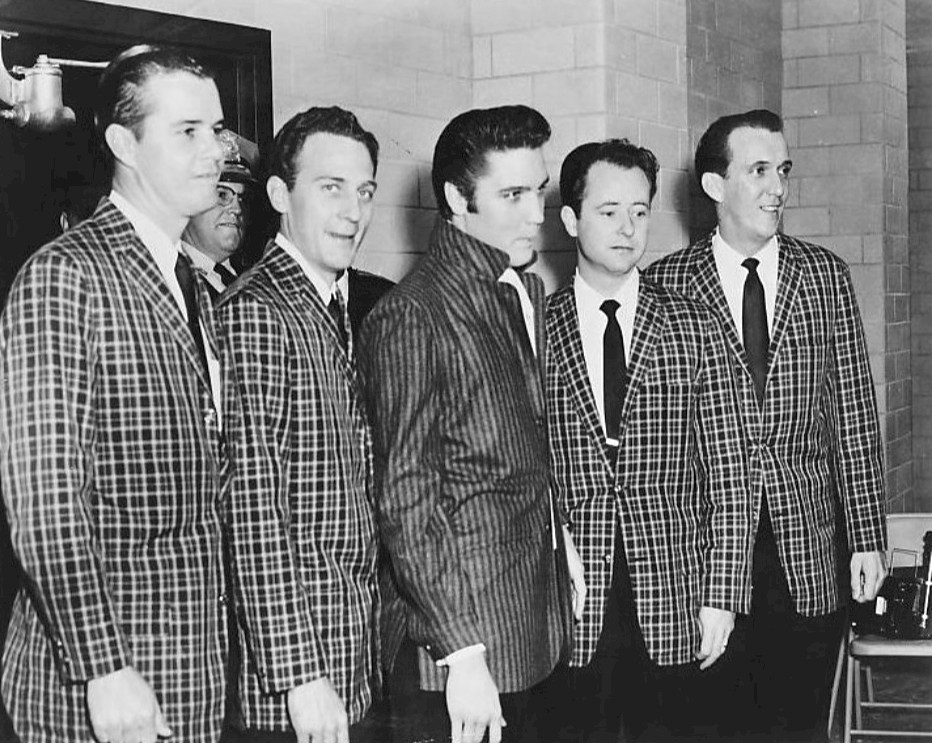
- The Jordanaires with Elvis Presley, 1957

Background information
- Origin: Springfield, Missouri, United States
- Genres: Gospel, country, rock and roll, folk
- Years active: 1948–2013
- Labels: Capitol, RCA Victor, Decca
- Past members: Ray Walker; Curtis Young; Gordon Stoker; Bill Matthews; Bob Hubbard; Warren (Monty) Matthews; Culley Holt; Hoyt Hawkins; Neal Matthews Jr.; Don Bruce; Hugh Jarrett; Duane West; Louis Nunley
- Website: jordanaires.net

The Jordanaires were an American vocal quartet that formed as a gospel group in 1948. Over the years, they recorded both sacred and secular music for recording companies such as Capitol Records, RCA Victor, Columbia Records, Decca Records, Vocalion Records, Stop Records, and many other smaller independent labels.

In the mid-1950s, with a lineup of Gordon Stoker (first tenor), Neal Matthews (second tenor and lead vocals), Hoyt Hawkins (baritone and lead vocals), and Hugh Jarrett (bass vocals), they also began lending their vocal talents to other artists as singers in recording sessions. They are widely known for having provided vocals for Elvis Presley in live appearances, recordings, and feature films from 1956 to 1970. Jarrett was replaced by then-teacher Ray Walker in 1958. The group worked in the recording studio, on stage, and on television with many country, gospel, and rock and roll artists.

They also provided background vocals using the names the Gordonaires (a play on the name of the group's first tenor Gordon Stoker), the Merry Melody Singers, and the Almanac Singers, sometimes using different personnel.

== Group history ==
=== Early years ===
The group was formed by brothers Monty and Bill Matthews, both of whom were evangelists, in the late 1940s. The original lineup included Bill Matthews, Monty Matthews, Bob Hubbard (baritone), and Culley Holt (bass vocals), who were soon joined by pianist Bob Money. By 1949, the group members had moved from Springfield, Missouri to Nashville, Tennessee.

They became members of the Grand Ole Opry in 1949, where they frequently provided harmony and backing vocals for Opry "headliner" Red Foley. In the early 1950s, the group had many lineup changes. Pianist Bob Money was replaced by Gordon Stoker, and founding members Bill and Monty Matthews left the group and moved back to Missouri. Stoker, who had been playing piano, also began singing with the group, taking on lead vocal and tenor roles, and new members Neal Matthews, Jr. (second tenor, and unrelated to Bill and Monty Matthews), Hoyt Hawkins (baritone), and Hugh Jarrett (bass vocals) joined in the early-to-mid-1950s.

Sister Rosetta Tharpe toured with the Jordanaires in the late forties and early fifties, one of the first multiracial gospel pairings.

They recorded for Capitol Records in the early 1950s, and began providing vocal accompaniment behind solo singers in Nashville.

The quartet became well known in the Southern gospel genre, and what made them stand out from other quartets of that time was how they would bring spirituals (such as "Dry Bones") to a predominantly white audience. While continuing to turn out gospel albums of their own, the group became better known for the signature background harmonies they provided on dozens of secular records.

In the late 1950s, member Neal Matthews, Jr. created the Nashville Number System for the Jordanaires (and the Nashville A-Team) to use to make recording easier and simplify any potential key changes during recording.

=== Elvis Presley ===
According to the Jordanaires' website, in 1955, they first met musician Elvis Presley, a fan of the group, backstage after a concert in Memphis, Tennessee with Eddy Arnold; at the time, Presley was signed to the Memphis-based label Sun Records. During this meeting, Presley told the group that he would like them to sing backup for him if he ever was signed to a major record label. Stoker later stated that the group "[wished] Elvis well, 'But we never expected to hear from him again,' ... 'People were always coming up and saying that. We're still told that.'"

After Presley's contract was sold to RCA Victor Records, he and his band the Blue Moon Boys (lead guitarist Scotty Moore, double bassist Bill Black, and drummer D. J. Fontana) had their first RCA sessions in January 1956. His co-producer, guitarist Chet Atkins, recruited Stoker to sing backup for "a 'new-probably-wouldn't-be-around-long kid, named Elvis Presley'". Instead of recruiting all of the Jordanaires, as Presley had wanted, Atkins hired Ben and Brock Speer of the vocal group the Speer Family, who had also recently signed to RCA, to sing with Stoker. Elvis, his band, Stoker, and Ben and Brock Speer, recorded "I Was The One" (the B-side of "Heartbreak Hotel") in January and "I Want You, I Need You, I Love You" in April. After the April session, Presley asked Stoker if the full group could join him in the studio for the next sessions. Stoker arranged this, and the full group began working with Presley shortly afterwards. They continued recording (and touring) with Presley regularly until 1968, and sporadically rejoined him for some sessions in 1970 and 1971.

=== Patsy Cline ===
The group appeared on all of Patsy Cline's Decca sessions from her first in November 1960 to her last in February 1963, during which time they backed her on songs such as:

- "A Poor Man's Roses (Or a Rich Man's Gold)"
- "Always"
- "Blue Moon of Kentucky"
- "Crazy"
- "Crazy Arms"
- "Faded Love"
- "Foolin' Around"
- "Half as Much"
- "Have You Ever Been Lonely (Have You Ever Been Blue)?"
- "Heartaches"
- "I Can't Help It (If I'm Still in Love with You)"
- "I Fall to Pieces"
- "Leavin' on Your Mind"
- "Love Letters in the Sand"
- "San Antonio Rose"
- "Seven Lonely Days"
- "She's Got You"
- "Someday (You'll Want Me to Want You)"
- "South of the Border (Down Mexico Way)"
- "Sweet Dreams"
- "That's My Desire"
- "The Wayward Wind"
- "True Love"
- "Walkin' After Midnight" (1961 recording)
- "You Belong to Me"
- "You Made Me Love You (I Didn't Want to Do It)"
- "Your Cheatin' Heart"

=== After Elvis and Cline ===
According to the Jordanaires' official website, in 1976 and 1979, the National Academy of Recording Arts and Sciences gave the group the "Superpickers" award "for having sung on more Top 10 discs than any other vocal group in history."

The group's lineup changed again in 1982, when Hoyt Hawkins died. His replacement was Duane West, formerly of Sonny James' backup group, the Southern Gentlemen, who had filled in for Hawkins on numerous occasions in the 1970s when Hawkins had been ill.

In 1984, they received the "'CMA Masters Award' for their lifetime contribution of music" from the Country Music Association.

In 1990, the group provided backing vocals for Presley's former Sun Records labelmate Johnny Cash on his Mercury Records album Boom Chicka Boom. The group also recorded with the Swedish group Vikingarna.

=== Later years and deaths ===
According to John Rumble and the Country Music Hall of Fame and Museum, in 2000, West left the group "due to illness". He was replaced by Louis Nunley. That same year, longtime member Neal Matthews, Jr. died, and he was replaced by Curtis Young.

In 2001, the Jordanaires were inducted into both the Country Music Hall of Fame and the Gospel Music Hall of Fame.

Hugh Jarrett died at 78 on May 31, 2008, from injuries sustained in an auto accident in March.

Gordon Stoker died at 88 at his Brentwood, Tennessee, home on March 27, 2013, after a long illness. His son Alan confirmed that the Jordanaires were formally dissolved, per his father's wishes.

Unreleased recordings featuring the Jordanaires continue to be released. In 2023, Dolly Parton's Rockstar album was released; it features a previously recorded version of "I Dreamed About Elvis" featuring the quartet. Parton performed this song in concert as early as 2007.

Surviving members include longtime member Ray Walker and later addition Curtis Young.

== Members ==
Partial credits from the Country Music Hall of Fame and Museum.

=== Classic lineup ===
- Hoyt Hawkins – baritone and lead vocals, piano, organ, percussion (1949–1980; died 1982)
- Neal Matthews Jr. – second tenor and lead vocals, rhythm guitar, lead guitar, double bass, bass guitar (1949–2000; died 2000)
- Gordon Stoker – tenor vocals, piano, organ, percussion (1951–2013; died 2013)
- Ray Walker – bass vocals (1958–2013)

=== Other members ===
- Bill Matthews – vocals (1948–1949; died 2003)
- Monty Matthews – vocals (1948–1949; died 2005)
- Bob Hubbard – baritone vocals (1948–1949; died 2020)
- Culley Holt – bass vocals (1949–1954; died 1980)
- Bob Money – piano (1949–1951; died 2005)
- Don Bruce – first tenor vocals (1949–1950)
- Hugh Jarrett – bass vocals (1954–1958; died 2008)
- Duane West – baritone vocals (1980–2000; died 2002)
- Louis Nunley – baritone vocals (2000–2012; died 2012)
- Curtis Young – lead vocals (2000–2013)

== Session appearances ==
The Jordanaires performed with many modern recording artists, as well as recent sessions with country musicians.

- 1957: Ricky Nelson's "Poor Little Fool", "Lonesome Town", "It's Late", "I Believe What You Say" and other hit recordings
- 1959: Several tracks on Johnny Cash's albums The Fabulous Johnny Cash and Songs of Our Soil, the 1978 album I Would Like to See You Again and others
- 1962: Faron Young's 1962 single "The Comeback"
- 1964: Cliff Richard's 1965 singles "The Minute You're Gone", "Wind Me Up (Let Me Go)", "On My Word" and a few other album and EP tracks
- 1970: Ringo Starr's second solo album, Beaucoups of Blues
- 1971: Gordon Lightfoot's "Summer Side of Life"
- 1973: Bobby Bare's hit single "Ride Me Down Easy"
- 1975: Jack Jersey two albums I Wonder (a live album) and Honky Tonk Man
- 1975: Gary Stewart's RCA debut Out of Hand, that spawned three top ten hits including the "She's Acting Single"
- 1980: Don McLean's album Chain Lightning
- 1981: Don McLean's album Believers
- 1981: On several tracks for Gene Summers' LP Gene Summers in Nashville
- 1984: Dolly Parton's song "Save the Last Dance for Me" on the album The Great Pretender
- 1985: Four songs by The Blasters' from their album Hard Line including "Samson and Delilah"
- 1988: Appeared in Sawyer Brown's music video "My Baby's Gone"
- 1993: "Bigger Than Elvis" on Chicago's album titled Chicago XXXII: Stone of Sisyphus, recorded in 1993 and published in 2008
- 1996: Ween's album 12 Golden Country Greats
- 1997: On "Who'll Be The One If Not Me" for the off-Broadway musical Violet
- 1998: On "You Better Move On" and "Tomorrow Night" on Sugar Ray Norcia's album Sweet & Swingin'
- 1999: Began their collaborative work with Art Greenhaw, which resulted in a Grammy Award for Best Southern, Country or Bluegrass Gospel Album for We Called Him Mr. Gospel Music: The James Blackwood Tribute Album (2003), and six Grammy nominations for Best Album of the Year in a gospel category for other album titles, including The Great Gospel Hit Parade (2001), God Is Love (2002), Always Hear The Harmony (2004), 20th Century Gospel (2005) and Southern Meets Soul (2006) AllMusic noted about the 20th Century Gospel album that "Greenhaw's manly baritone is warm and inviting, and when backed by vocal-group legends the Jordanaires ("Gospel Woman", "Welcome to My World"), the resultant sound suggests the glory days of Elvis Presley and Jim Reeves."
- 2002: Sang with The Tractors' Steve Ripley
- 2006: The Grascals album Long List of Heartaches, on the song "Did You Forget God Today?"
- 2006–07: Friends of Henry Golis Wish You A Merry Christmas with the Jordanaires, and Henry Golis Presents Good Music With Friends featuring the Jordanaires
- 2007: Appeared with the Christian pop band Chicago's Band of Praise on the songs "Between You & Me" and "Live Like A King" on the album A Road Less Traveled written by Howard Stanley
- 2007: "Save Your Dreams" by Americana artist Shark
- 2009: Today, Tomorrow & Forever EP by Pete Molinari
- 2010: Last Night In Nashville album by The Kingmakers
- 2011: Kristin Chenoweth's Some Lessons Learned, on "What Would Dolly Do"
- 2023: Dolly Parton's "I Dreamed About Elvis" (credited to "Dolly Parton with Ronnie McDowell and special guests The Jordanaires") from Parton's 2023 album Rockstar. While released in 2023, the song was recorded at some point prior to 2013, when the group disbanded after Gordon Stoker's death.

== See also ==
- The Nashville A-Team
