= Neal Matthews Jr. =

American vocalist

Neal Matthews Jr. (October 26, 1929 – April 21, 2000) was an American vocalist who achieved fame as part of The Jordanaires, one of country music's premier backup groups; most notably with Elvis Presley. Matthews played guitar, double bass, and bass guitar.

== Biography ==
Born in Nashville, Tennessee to Neal Matthews Sr., Matthews served with the United States Army during the Korean War and received a Bronze Star. Following his discharge in 1953, he became a member of the Nashville-based singing group, The Jordanaires. Matthews developed the Nashville Number System for chords in music that was instrumental in creating the Nashville sound.

As a member of The Jordanaires, he worked with artists such as Patsy Cline, Red Foley, Johnny Horton, Ferlin Husky, Jim Reeves, and George Jones. The group also served as backup vocalists for pop music artists such as Steve Lawrence and Eydie Gorme, Connie Francis, and Julie Andrews, but are best known as the backup vocalists for Elvis Presley for 15 years.

Matthews and the group also toured extensively around the world and recorded a number of their own albums, winning a Grammy Award for Best Southern, Country, or Bluegrass Album.

Matthews died of a heart attack at age 70 and was interred in the Woodlawn Memorial Park in Nashville. He was survived by his wife Charlsie Stewart Matthews, daughter Lisa Matthews Doster, son Gregory Stewart Matthews, and grandsons Matthew Thomas Doster and William Cole Doster.

As part of The Jordanaires, he was inducted posthumously into the Country Music Hall of Fame in 2001.
