= Chord chart =

Form of sheet music

A chord chart.

A chord chart (or chart) is a form of musical notation that describes the basic harmonic and rhythmic information for a song or tune. It is the most common form of notation used by professional session musicians playing jazz or popular music. It is intended primarily for a rhythm section (usually consisting of piano, guitar, drums and bass). In these genres the musicians are expected to be able to improvise the individual notes used for the chords (the "voicing") and the appropriate ornamentation, counter melody or bassline.

In some chord charts, the harmony is given as a series of chord symbols above a traditional musical staff. The rhythmic information can be very specific and written using a form of traditional notation, sometimes called rhythmic notation, or it can be completely unspecified using slash notation, allowing the musician to fill the bar with chords or fills any way they see fit (called comping). In Nashville notation the key is left unspecified on the chart by substituting numbers for chord names. This facilitates on-the-spot key changes to songs. Chord charts may also include explicit parts written in modern music notation (such as a musical riff that the song is dependent on for character), lyrics or lyric fragments, and various other information to help the musician compose and play their part.

== Rhythmic notation ==
Rhythmic notation specifies the exact rhythm in which to play or comp the indicated chords. The chords are written above the staff and the rhythm is indicated in the traditional manner, though pitch is unspecified through the use of slashes placed on the center line instead of notes. This is contrasted with the less specific slash notation.

== Slash notation ==
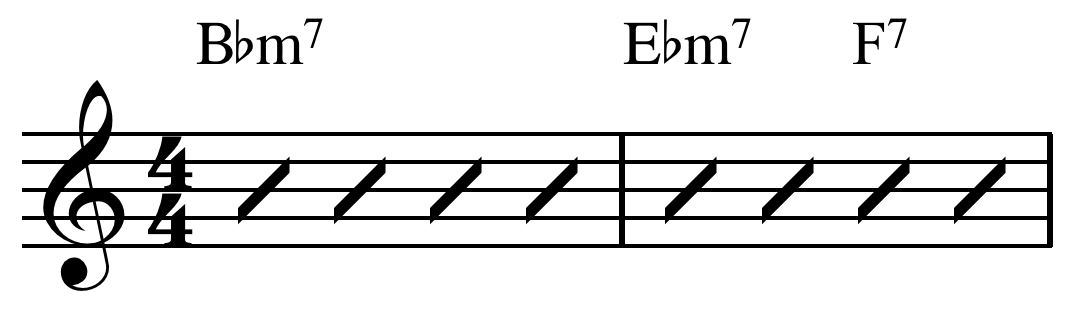
Slash notation in 4/4 with a slash on each beat under a i^{7}–iv^{7}–V^{7} chord progression in B♭ minor

Slash notation is a form of purposely vague musical notation which indicates or requires that an accompaniment player or players improvise their own rhythm pattern or comp according to the chord symbol given above the staff. On the staff a slash is placed on each beat (so that there are four slashes per measure in 4/4 time).

Slash notation and rhythmic notation may both be used in the same piece, for example, with the more specific rhythmic notation used in a section where the horn section is playing a specific melody or rhythmic figure that the pianist must support, and with slash notation written for the pianist for use underneath improvised solos.

== Nashville notation ==
Nashville notation or Nashville number system is a method of notating chord changes using numbers based on scale degrees, in lieu of chord names. For example, in the key of C major, the chord D minor seventh can be written as 2−^{7}, 2m^{7}, IIm^{7} or ii^{7}.

"The musicians in Nashville use the Nashville Number System almost exclusively for conveying a song's structure and arrangement in the recording studio."

In Nashville notation, the chord numbers map to the chord built diatonically on each scale degree in the major key or the closest relative major key – of the song.

Example mappings of chord numbers to chord letters and qualities
Chord number	Key of C	Key of G
1	C major	G major
2−	D minor	A minor
3−	E minor	B minor
4	F major	C major
5	G major	D major
6−	A minor	E minor
7°	B diminished	F♯ diminished

Chords can be built in the same way for all twelve Major keys.

Therefore, in the key of C, this chord progression

| C / / / | F / / / | G / / / | C / / / | 

and in the key of G, this chord progression

| G / / / | C / / / | D / / / | G / / / |

in Nashville notation, the chord chart for both would be notated as

1 4 5 1

By convention, Nashville notation eliminates the slashes and bar lines that denote the beats in the measure: "With the number system it’s understood that each number written on your chart is given the value of one measure of music. In 4/4 time, that’s a total of four beats per number on the chart."

This method of notation allows musicians who are familiar with basic music theory to play the same song in any key.

Note:
Although Nashville Notation can use either Arabic numerals or Roman numerals, the practice of using Roman numerals differs from Roman numeral analysis. Roman numeral analysis is intended to describe the harmonic function of chords in a musical composition during analysis, whereas Nashville notation is intended to describe the musical structure of a song and be used during a musical performance. As an example: in the key of C, Roman numeral analysis considers a D major chord as a "V/V" (pronounced "five of five"), that is, the fifth chord of the fifth chord, which is expected to resolve to the fifth chord (G major) of the tonic (C major). In Nashville notation, this same D major chord would be represented instead as a "two major" chord (2△ or 2M) with no implication as to its function.

== Grid notation ==
In some European countries (particularly France), pop and jazz musicians often use so-called "chord grids" that show in a graphical way the chord progression. To illustrate, below is an example of two-part tunes, each eight bars long. Each square stands for a bar, while the "•/•”symbol means to stay on the same chord as the previous bar. The song structure can then be written down as a succession of the different parts. For example A-A-B-A, that would mean to play twice the "A" part, once the "B" part, and then again once the "A" part.

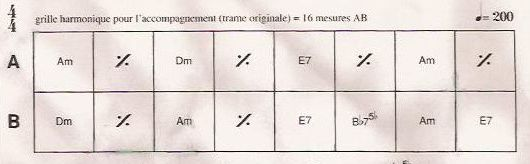

Squares can also be separated diagonally for bars having two chords, as in the example below:

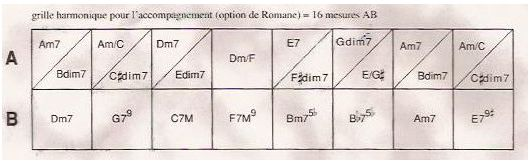

== Chord charts in computer files ==
Digital representations of chord charts enable musicians to create, store and distribute song arrangements using computer systems, computer networks and the internet.

=== Plain text (ASCII) representations of chord charts ===
A plain text (ASCII) representation of digital chord charts supports broad compatibility across computer systems and devices, since ASCII text files can be serialized to disk, transmitted via email, shared through cloud storage services, and displayed in text editors that are preinstalled on most operating systems.

Note:
Technically, modern computer systems support UTF-8, a standard Unicode character encoding whose first 128 characters map directly to the ASCII character set, making it compatible with ASCII.

Below is a non-exhaustive list of plain text chord chart representations, including examples for reference. (You can help improve this article by adding other plain text representations of chord charts to this section.)

==== Format: Pipes and slashes (ASCII) ====
Chord charts can be represented schematically, where:

- Bar lines are given as pipe symbols "|"
- Chord symbols are represented as text
- Beats are optionally indicated with a forward slash "/".

To illustrate, the following ASCII text represents the first verse of the public domain hymn Amazing Grace, in 3/4 meter:

Amazing Grace (Traditional)

Verse 1:
| G  / / | G7   / /  | C / / | G / /    |
| G  / / | G/B  / /  | D / / | D / /    |
| G  / / | G7/B / /  | C / / | G / G/F# |
| Em / / | G/D  / D7 | G / / | G / /    ||

The performer should interpret this such that each chord symbol occupies one beat, with each slash signifying that the preceding chord should be played for additional beats, represented by the number of additional slashes after the chord symbol. For example, the first measure (bar) of this chord chart consists of three beats of the G major chord.

A more compact form of this could be represented as:

Amazing Grace (Traditional)

Verse 1:
| G  | G7       | C | G        |
| G  | G/B      | D | D7       |
| G  | G7/B     | C | G / G/F♯ |
| Em | G/D / D7 | G | G        ||

==== Format: Chords over lyrics (ASCII) ====
The term "chord chart" can also describe a plain ASCII text, digital representation of a lyric sheet where chord symbols are placed above the syllables of the lyrics where the performer should change chords.

Continuing with the Amazing Grace example, a "chords over lyrics" version of the chord chart could be represented as follows:

Amazing Grace (Traditional)

[Verse 1]
 G      G7         C         G
Amazing grace, how sweet the sound
     G       G/B         D      D7
That saved a wretch like me
  G        G7/B      C       G
I once was lost, but now I'm found
G/F# Em         G/D D7 G
Was  blind, but now I  see

==== Format: ChordPro (ASCII) ====
ChordPro is one ASCII file representation standard for the aforementioned style of lyric sheet, but instead of placing the chords above the lyrics, the chords changes are placed inline with the lyrics, directly preceding the lyrical syllable where the chords should change. Given a ChordPro format input file, the ChordPro program outputs a format similar to the aforementioned "chords over lyrics" format.

In ChordPro format, Amazing Grace could be notated as follows:

{title: Amazing Grace}
{key: G}

{start_of_verse}
A-[G]mazing [G7]grace, how [C]sweet the [G]sound
That [G]saved a [G/B]wretch like [D]me [D7]
I [G]once was [G7/B]lost, but [C]now I'm [G]found
[G/F#]Was  [Em]blind, but [G/D]now [D7]I  [G]see
{end_of_verse}

ChordPro files often have the file extensions .cho, .crd, .chopro, .chord and .pro, but could also have the common .txt extension.

Multiple open source and commercial software support ChordPro format chord charts, including:

- ChordPro code libraries
  - ChordPro reference implementation (Github)
- Chord chart format conversion
  - Menees Chord Sheet Converter - for converting to ChordPro format from other, less-strict chord charts ASCII representations
  - Frederik Tesche's online Ultimate Guitar to ChordPro Converter - for converting Ultimate Guitar chord charts to Chord Pro format
- Chord chart organization & file management
  - OnSong natively works with ChordPro format chord charts
  - Gig Performer
  - The Charts app by WorshipTools natively works with ChordPro format chord charts
- Chord chart publishing
  - CCLI SongSelect publishes chord charts for songs in ChordPro format

== See also ==
- Chord notation
- Chord progression
- Lead sheet
