= Jazz improvisation =

Spontaneous composition in jazz

Jazz improvisation by Col Loughnan (tenor saxophone) at the Manly Jazz Festival with the Sydney Jazz Legends. Loughnan was accompanied by Steve Brien (guitar), Craig Scott (double bass, face obscured), and Ron Lemke (drums).

Jazz improvisation is the spontaneous invention of melodic solo lines or accompaniment parts in a performance of jazz music. It is one of the defining elements of jazz. Improvisation is composing on the spot, when a singer or instrumentalist invents melodies and lines over a chord progression played by rhythm section instruments (piano, guitar, double bass) and accompanied by drums. Although blues, rock, and other genres use improvisation, it is done over relatively simple chord progressions which often remain in one key (or closely related keys using the circle of fifths, such as a song in C Major modulating to G Major).

Jazz improvisation is distinguished from this approach by chordal complexity, often with one or more chord changes per bar, altered chords, extended chords, tritone substitution, unusual chords (e.g., augmented chords), and extensive use of ii–V–I progression, all of which typically move through multiple keys within a single song. However, since the release of Kind of Blue by Miles Davis, jazz improvisation has come to include modal harmony and improvisation over static key centers, while the emergence of free jazz has led to a variety of types of improvisation, such as "free blowing", in which soloists improvise freely and ignore the chord changes.

== Soloing ==
When soloing, a performer (instrumentalist or singer) creates a new melodic line to fit a song's chord progression. During a solo, the performer who is playing the solo is the main focus of the audience's attention. The other members of the group usually accompany the solo, except for some drum solos or bass solos in which the entire band may stop while the drummer or bassist performs.

When a singer improvises a new melody over chord changes, it is called scat singing. When singers are scat-singing, they typically use made-up syllables, rather than use the lyrics of the song. Soloing is often associated with instrumental or vocal virtuosity; while many artists do use advanced techniques in their solos, this is not always done. For example, some 1940s and 1950s-era bass solos consist of the bassist playing a walking bassline.

There are a number of approaches to improvising jazz solos. During the swing era, performers improvised solos by ear by using riffs and variations on the tune's melody. During the bebop era in the 1940s, jazz composers began writing more complex chord progressions. Saxophone player Charlie Parker began soloing using the scales and arpeggios associated with the chords in the chord progression.

== Accompaniment ==
In jazz, when one instrumentalist or singer is doing a solo, the other ensemble members play accompaniment parts. While fully written-out accompaniment parts are used in large jazz ensembles, such as big bands, in small groups (e.g., jazz quartet, piano trio, organ trio, etc.), the rhythm section members typically improvise their accompaniment parts, an activity called comping. In jazz, the instruments in the rhythm section depend on the type of group, but they usually include a bass instrument (double bass, electric bass), one or more instruments capable of playing chords (e.g., piano, electric guitar) and drum kit. Some ensembles may use different instruments in these roles. For example, a 1920s-style Dixieland jazz band may use tuba as a bass instrument and banjo as the chordal instrument. A 1980s-era jazz-rock fusion band may use synth bass for the bassline and a synthesizer for chords. Some bands add one or more percussionists.

In small groups, the rhythm section members typically improvise their accompaniment parts. Bass instrument players improvise a bassline using the chord progression of the key as a guide. Common styles of bass comping parts include a walking bassline for 1920s-1950s jazz; rock-style ostinato riffs for jazz-rock fusion; and Latin basslines for Latin jazz. Improvised basslines typically outline the harmony of each chord by playing the root, third, fifth and seventh of each chord, and playing any other notes that the composer has requested in the chord (e.g., if the chord chart indicates a sixth chord on the tonic in C Major, the bassist might include the sixth degree of the C Major scale, an "A" note, in their bassline).

The chordal instrument players improvise chords based on the chord progression. Chordal instrument players use jazz chord voicings that are different from those used in popular music and classical music from the common practice period. For example, if a pop musician or one from the Baroque music era (ca. 1600-1750) were asked to play a dominant seventh chord in the key of C Major, they would probably play a root position chord named G7 (or "G dominant seventh"), which consists of the notes G, B, D and F, which are the root, third, fifth and flat seventh of the G chord. A post-Bebop era jazz player who was asked to play a dominant seventh chord in the key of C Major might play an altered dominant chord built on G. An altered dominant contains flattened or sharpened "extensions" in addition to the basic elements of the chord. As well, in jazz, chordal musicians often omit the root, as this role is given to the bass player. The fifth of the chord is often omitted as well, if it is a perfect fifth above the root (as is the case in regular major chords and minor chords).

The altered extensions played by a jazz guitarist or jazz pianist on an altered dominant chord on G might include (at the discretion of the performer) a flatted ninth A♭ (a ninth scale degree flattened by one semitone); a sharp eleventh C♯ (an eleventh scale degree raised by one semitone) and a flattened thirteenth E♭ (a thirteenth scale degree lowered by one semitone). If the chordal playing musician were to omit the root and fifth of the dominant seventh chord (the G and D) and keep the third (B) and flatted seventh (F), and add the altered tones just listed (A♭, C♯ and E♭), the resulting chord would be the pitches B, C♯, E♭, F, A♭, which is a much different-sounding chord than the standard G7 played by a pop musician (G, B, D, F). In Classical harmony and in pop music, chord voicings often double the root to emphasize the foundation of the chord progression.

== Soloing techniques ==
=== Melodic variation and playing by ear ===
From the dixieland era through to the swing music era, many solo performers improvised by varying and embellishing the existing melody of a song and by playing by ear over the chord changes using well-known riffs. While this approach worked well during these musical eras, given that the chord progressions were simpler and used less modulation to unusual keys, with the development of bebop in the 1940s, the embellishment and "playing by ear" approach was no longer enough.

Although swing was designed for dancing, bebop was not. Bebop used complex chord progressions, unusual altered chords and extended chords, and extensive modulations, including to remote keys that are not closely related to the tonic key (the main key or home key of a song). Whereas Dixieland and swing tunes might have one chord change every two bars with some sections with one chord change per bar, bebop tunes often had two chord changes per bar with many changing key every four bars. In addition, since bebop was for listening rather than dancing, the tempo was not constrained by danceability; bebop tunes were often faster than those of the swing era.

With bebop's complex tunes and chords and fast tempo, melodic embellishments and playing by ear were no longer sufficient to enable performers to improvise effectively. Saxophone player Charlie Parker began to solo by using scales associated with the chords, including altered extensions such as flattened ninths, sharpened elevenths and flattened thirteenths, and by using the chord tones and themselves as a framework for the creation of chromatic improvisation.

=== Modes ===
Modes are all the different musical scales and may be thought of as being derived from various chords. Musicians can use these modes as a pool of available notes. For example, if a musician comes across a C7 chord in a tune, the mode to play over this chord is a C mixolydian scale.

These are various chord derivations that help musicians know which chord is associated with a certain scale or mode:

- C7 → C mixolydian
- C-7 → C dorian
- Cmaj7 → C Ionian (natural major)
- Cmaj7♯11 → C Lydian mode
- Csus♭9 → C phrygian
- C- → C Aeolian mode (natural minor)
- C^{ø}/C-7♭5 → C ..Locrian

=== Targeting ===
One of the key concepts of improvisation is targeting, a technique used by Charlie Parker. Targeting means landing on the tones of a chord. A chord is built of a root (1st) and the notes a 3rd, 5th, 7th, 9th, 11th and 13th above the root in the scale. There are a number of ways to target a chord tone.

The first is by ascending or descending chromatic approach (chromatic targeting). This means playing the note a semitone above or below one of the chord tones. In the key of C, the notes in the tonic chord are C(1st or root of chord), E(3rd), G(5th), and B(7th). So by playing a D sharp at the end of a line then resolving (moving up a semitone) to an E, this would be one basic example of targeting and would be targeting the third of the chord (E♮). This may be used with any factor of any type of chord, but rhythm is played so that the chord tones fall on the downbeats.

Enclosure is another way of targeting a chord tone, by using the scale tone(s) above the targeted note and chromatic tone(s) below, or scale tone(s) below and chromatic tone(s) above.. A chromatic enclosure surrounds the target note with a chromatic tone above and another chromatic tone below.Larsen, Jens (2026-10-26), Chromatic Enclosures

In Bebop melodic improvisation, targeting often focused on the 9th, 11th and 13th of the chord - the colour tones - before resolving later in the phrase to a 7th chord tone. In bebop the 9th, 11th and 13th notes were often altered by adding sharps or flats to these notes. Ninths could be flatted or sharpened. Elevenths were typically played sharpened. Thirteenths were often played flat.

=== "Flat 9" theory ===
Another technique in jazz improvisation used by Charlie Parker is known "three to flat nine". These numbers refer to degrees of the scale above the root note of a given chord in a chord progression. This is a bebop approach similar to targeting. This technique can be used over any dominant chord that can be treated as a flat nine (b9) dominant chord. It entails moving from the third of a dominant chord, to the flat nine of a dominant chord, by skipping directly to the ninth, or by a diminished arpeggio (ascending: 3rd, 5th 7th, ♭9th). The chord often resolves to a major chord a perfect fourth away. For example, the third of a G7 chord is B, while the flat ninth is A♭. The chord resolves to C and the note A♭ leads to G.

=== Pentatonics ===
Pentatonic scales are also commonly used in jazz improvisation, drawing perhaps from their use in the blues. Saxophone player John Coltrane used pentatonics extensively. Most scales are made up of seven notes: (in the key of C – the major scale) C D E F G A B). The major pentatonic scale comprises only five notes of the major scale (C pentatonic scale is C D E G A), whereas the minor pentatonic scale comprises the five notes (C E♭ F G B♭). Pentatonics are useful in pattern form and that is how they are usually played. One pattern using the pentatonic scale could be 3 6 5 2 3 5 (in C: E A G D E G). Pentatonic scales also became popular in rock music, jazz fusion and electric blues.

=== Cells and lines ===
Lines (also known as licks) are pre-planned musical passages that the artist plays during an improvised solo. Lines can be obtained by listening to jazz records and transcribing what the professionals play during their solos. Shortened versions of lines are called cells.

=== Phrasing ===
Phrasing is a very important part of jazz players' set of improvisational skills. Instead of just playing a sequence of scale and chord notes that would work based on the chords, harmony, etc., the player builds an idea based on a melodic motif or a rhythmic motif. The player in effect extemporizes a new melody for a tune's chord progression. Alto saxophonist Charlie Parker, who is considered to be an exemplar of jazz improvisation, paid special attention to the beginning and ending of his solos where he placed signature patterns that he developed over the years. The middle part of his solos used more extemporaneous material that was created in the moment. This shows a developed style of musical phrasing where the shape of the melody has a logical conclusion. With his strong beginning, Parker was free to create solos that demonstrated musical phrasing and led to a logical and memorable conclusion. Examples of this motif-based approach in a compositional context are found in classical music. In Beethoven's fifth symphony, the first rhythmic and melodic idea is played again with many variations.

== The social dimension ==
Jazz improvisation includes a multitude of social customs for which the musicians have to adhere to. However, "there is no Emily Post handbook for these protocols, but people who drink in the culture of jazz learn what these conventions are." There are no strict rules, but rather general social protocols that guide the players through when to begin their improvisational solo and when to end. These social protocols also tell the player vaguely what to solo about, for example it is a nice gesture to take parts or an end of the previous musician's solo to then incorporate into the new improviser's solo. For beginning jazz listeners, it can be difficult to understand the structure of a jazz solo and how it fits into the overall song. It may take some time for a listener to even recognize that there is a distinct format for solos in jazz music. Additionally, understanding the role of improvisation in jazz can be challenging to gain from just listening alone, which is why seasoned listeners may be able to recognize solos and formats after "drinking in the culture of jazz" for a longer period of time, therefore, the superficial aspect of a jazz solo is inherently tied to its situational context. The enjoyment and comprehension of a spectator who is unacquainted with the regulations or benchmarks of a sport is similarly lacking in comparison to the enjoyment and comprehension of a listener who is not conversant in the conventions of jazz. In summary, to appreciate jazz improvisation, it is important to not only consider the sound of the music, but also the social and moral dimensions of the art form, including the underlying social structures and the ways in which musicians interact and express themselves.

=== Search for the self ===
According to one model of repetition, defined by Gilles Deleuze, is the synthesis of time through memory that creates something new for the subject who is remembering. The past is repeated and related to other past events, creating a new understanding of the past. However, this repetition is still closed, as the subject only remembers things that confirm their existing identity. This means that any attempt at self-realization is ultimately unsuccessful. Jazz improvisers must use their memory in order to interpret the form of a song and to reference how other musicians have interpreted it in their own improvisations. The challenge for the improviser is to repeat the form in a recognizable way, but to also improvise on it in a way that is original and distinguishes them from other musicians. This repetition allows the audience to recognize the form and the improviser's own style, but according to Theodor Adorno, it ultimately only reinforces the improviser's existing ideas of themselves and does not allow for true self-realization. On the other hand, The concept of signifyin(g) as repetition with a difference, which means that the identity of any particular instance of signifyin(g) and the person engaging in it is constantly changing and influenced by what has come before. This idea, put forward by Henry Louis Gates and Jacques Derrida, also implies that all improvisation is connected to previous instances of the art form, making it impossible for an improviser to be truly autonomous. This complicates the identity of any particular improvisation and the improviser themselves.

In psychoanalysis, repetition is an important aspect of identity formation and is associated with what Sigmund Freud called the death drive. This drive goes against the pleasure principle, which states that people will avoid unpleasurable experiences, and instead compels people to repeat traumatic or unpleasant events. According to Freud, this drive is fundamental to the human psyche and is connected to the unconscious. It seeks to return the psyche to its original, quiescent state and to a sense of unity with itself. This repetition and the associated narcissism can be seen in some jazz improvisations, where the desire for self-realization can be self-absorbing and self-negating.

=== Influence ===
Improvisational music also has a social dimension that is influenced by the time, place, history, and culture in which it is performed. This means that listening to improvisational music can be a way to engage with these specific historical and cultural contexts. Improvisation not only shows how people create and shape music, but it can also provide insight into the ways that people think and act. Particular improvisations can have significance because of the specific historical situations in which they were created. Jazz performers pick up cultural attitudes and historical memory, making them their own through improvisation: “memory figures… in a memory of the form, in the first place, but also in a memory of all the ways that form has been rendered by other players and by the improviser herself”. Therefore, the memory of the Jazz piece and the reiteration of the piece helps to insert fragments of the player’s self into the music, as it's hard to remember exactly what a particular Jazz piece was, primarily if it wasn't composed. In other words, the player utilizes their knowledge of past sounds and reiterates a new song based on past precedents, intuition, and culture. A closer look at the influence of jazz improvisation reveals its deep connection with kinetic orality, as both concepts emphasize the physical and vocal expressions that drive jazz performance. Kinetic orality perpetuates embodied musical traditions—movement, rhythm, and spontaneous vocalization—which directly inform how jazz musicians improvise and interact on stage. Together, these elements foster a unique environment of musicking in jazz, where improvisation is not just a technical skill but a communal, lived experience. The interplay between kinetic orality and improvisation is fundamental, making each jazz performance a vibrant act of collective creativity and cultural expression.

=== Ethics ===
Many people believe that the social aspect of jazz improvisation can serve as a good foundation for ethics. Kathleen Higgins argues that the way that individuals and groups interact and improvise in jazz can be seen as a model for ethical interactions, particularly between minority and majority populations. This idea is supported by Ingrid Monson, a musicologist, and Jacques Attali, an economist and scholar. Eugene W. Holland has proposed jazz improvisation as a model for social and economic relations in general. Edward W. Sarath has proposed jazz improvisation as a model for change in music, education, and society.

Jazz improvisation can also be seen as a model for human interactions. Jazz improvisation presents an image or representation of the ways in which humans engage with and interact with one another and the world around them, through a variety of linguistic, gestural, and expressive means. Through this process, musicians can collectively negotiate and ultimately constitute their shared musical and cultural space, which is important to the ethics of jazz improvisation since it highlights the collaborative and interactive nature of jazz improvisation and how music reflects and engages with the world.
