= Nashville Number System =

Method of chord notation

The Nashville Number System is a shorthand method of music notation that represents chords using Arabic numerals rather than staff notation. Developed in Nashville, Tennessee, in the late 1950s by session musicians Neal Matthews Jr. and Charlie McCoy, the system enabled musicians to chart songs quickly during recording sessions in a compact key-independent format that subsequently gained international acceptance among musicians .

The system assigns numbers to chords according to the scale degree of their root, with the tonic of the song's key designated as 1. For example, the 1, 2, and 3 chords in C major have roots C, D, and E; when transposed to C♯ major, their roots become C♯, D♯, and E♯(F), but their numerical designations remain 1, 2, and 3. Because the numbers express relationships to the tonic rather than fixed pitches, the same chart can be used in different keys

Although conceptually similar to Roman numeral analysis, the Nashville system is primarily a practical notation for musical performance rather than harmonic analysis. Created primarily for vocal groups and instrumental rhythm sections, a Nashville Number System chart provides the harmonic and structural framework of a song without specifying every note to be played. Typically, musicians spontaneously improvise the voicings, solos, and other performance details from this framework. Its compact form, ease of rapid transcription, and ability to easily transpose, make it especially well-suited for studio recording.

== Background ==
In major recording centers such as New York in the 1950s, recording sessions were typically based on arrangements prepared in advance. An arranger developed the song from a demo recording and wrote individual parts for the musicians, who came to the studio and performed the parts as written, with little or no embellishment or alteration. Responsibility for the resulting product rested almost entirely on the arranger.

Producer Billy Sherrill later contrasted this approach with Nashville recording, observing that changes to a fully written arrangement could be costly and time-consuming. In a 1973 interview in Time Magazine Sherrill said, " In New York, you start to change something, you tear up a $700,000 arrangement."

A different working method existed in Nashville and other Southern recording centers, including Muscle Shoals. Rather than relying on complete arrangements prepared beforehand, session musicians often created the arrangement collectively in the studio. A demo recording might be played repeatedly until the musicians had memorized the song and could improvise their parts by ear. In studio parlance, this practice became known as a "head session".

What emerged was a way to capture an arrangement almost as quickly as it developed, with musicians jotting down numbers and other markings as they listened to the demo. The method reduced the need to memorize the song and provided a written format that could keep pace with changes made during the session.

== History ==
In the late 1950s, Neal Matthews Jr., a member and vocal arranger of the Jordanaires, developed this particular Nashville system initially for writing vocal parts using Arabic numerals for use by the group in recording sessions. The Country Music Hall of Fame and Museum credits Matthews with popularizing the system. In the early 1960s, Nashville session musician Charlie McCoy adapted Matthews's numerical approach to chart chords for bass, drums, piano, and guitar. Its flexibility in accommodating spontaneous arrangement changes and changes of key contributed to its usefulness in studio recording.

According to Chas Williams's history of the system, Matthews drew on his familiarity with shape-note notation, which had long been used by gospel quartets and assigned distinctive shapes to the notes of the scale. Because the Jordanaires often worked several recording sessions a day, Matthews sought a way to write vocal parts quickly rather than rely on memorization. He began replacing the shape-note symbols with numbers and developed a numerical notation for the group's vocal arrangements.

The Nashville numbering system provided us the shorthand that we needed so that we could depend on our ears rather than a written arrangement. It took far less time to jot the chords, and once you had the chart written, it applied to any key. The beauty of the system is that we don't have to read. We don't get locked into an arrangement that we may feel is not as good as one we can improvise.

— The Jordanaires' Neal Matthews Jr.

== Earlier systems of relative and numerical notation ==
The use of syllables or numbers to represent musical relationships long predates the Nashville Number System. In Western music, solmization developed during the Middle Ages as a method of teaching pitch relationships. In the 11th century, Guido of Arezzo introduced the syllables ut, re, mi, fa, sol, and la as an aid to teaching singers. The practice later developed into solfège, which in English-speaking countries commonly uses the seven syllables do, re, mi, fa, sol, la, and ti.

Numbered systems for representing musical notes appeared in Europe by the late 17th century and were further developed in the 18th century by Jean-Jacques Rousseau, who proposed representing the seven degrees of the diatonic scale with the numbers 1 through 7. In 19th-century France, the Galin-Paris-Chevé system further developed numbered notation, particularly for music education and sight-reading.

These earlier numbered systems primarily use numbers to represent individual notes or scale degrees. The Nashville Number System instead uses numbers primarily to represent chords, according to their relationship to the tonic. In this respect it resembles Roman numeral analysis, in which chords are likewise identified by scale degree rather than by absolute pitch. The Nashville system, however, uses Arabic rather than Roman numerals and incorporates additional symbols and conventions suited to the practical requirements of popular-music performance and recording.

== Notation and conventions ==
Charts are commonly arranged in lines of four measures, with each measure containing one or more numbers representing its chords. When more than one chord occurs within a measure, the chords may be grouped by underlining or other markings (example below). The chart's key center (tonic note) must be correctly determined to make the number system accurate. The tonic establishes the reference point from which all chord numbers are assigned. In the example below, the key center is not the first chord; this song starts on the 4 chord. The system represents chords by their scale degree relative to the tonic, using Arabic numerals rather than chord letters. In its simplest form, consider the C major scale on a piano— all white keys, numbered 1–7. If a musician is comfortable playing in all 12 keys, they can use those 7 numbers as mental template for any key. Thus, in the key of C major, the 1, 4, and 5 chords are C–F–G ; if the song is transposed to B major, the corresponding B–E–F# chords are still 1, 4, and 5. Because these numerical relationships remain unchanged when the key changes, a chart can ordinarily be transposed without being rewritten. All chords are considered as major chords (without applying diatonic theory) until chord qualities are applied. The chord qualities are designated with symbols commonly used in popular music chord notation such as sevenths, diminished, augmented, suspended, minor (usually indicated by a minus sign or m), and others.

Nashville charts may also convey information needed in performance, including rhythm, chord duration, articulation, rests, anticipated chord changes ("pushes"), and changes in song form or arrangement. Common conventions include a diamond around a number to indicate a sustained chord, and, for a staccato chord, a marcato symbol or a dot. Rests are generally indicated by conventional notation, although some musicians use other markings.

The symbols and conventions are not completely standardized, and individual musicians may use different methods of notation. Chas Williams illustrates this variation by reproducing charts of the same song prepared independently by seven professional Nashville session musicians, allowing their individual practices to be compared.

The number system has an exception to the chromatic rule— that is, when notes are ascending, sharps are written, and if descending, flats. The rule is typically ignored on 3b ("three flat") and the 7b ("seven flat"), because these have become such familiar harmonic concepts in popular music that have become conventional terms for chromatic roots measured from 1. They are rarely, if ever, written as 2# and 6#.

The amount of information included in a chart varies with the needs of the arrangement. A chart may provide little more than a skeletal harmonic and structural framework, leaving performers to develop individual parts and voicings, or it may include detailed rhythmic and performance instructions. Traditional staff notation may also be incorporated on occasion when a particular melodic or rhythmic passage must be played as written (example below).

Despite the amount of information that may be included, the system's compact format can usually represent the functional harmony and structure of an entire song on a single page.

== Example ==
The accompanying chart of “After You've Gone”, a song transcribed by Nashville studio musician Bobby Ogdin, illustrates the Nashville notation's typical song form, tempo, chord-quality, time signature, alternate bass notes, articulation markings, "pushes" (anticipatory chords), and held chords. Because Nashville Number System notation is not completely standardized, some of the symbols reflect the individual transcriber's practice.

A Demo of "After You've Gone" as written at left

"After You've Gone" by Creamer and Layton, 1918.

chord chart/arrangement in Nashville Number System

=== Notes on the example: ===
- The first note is not always the tonic note—this example begins on the 4 chord.
- Δ indicates major 7th chord.
- Minus sign indicates minor chord.
- Underlining indicates a split measure.
- Boxed measure indicates complex measure. Hashmarks denote individual beats.
- 1/5 means the 1 chord with a 5 bass note.
- Final measure has a "push", (anticipated beat), and sustained chord.

== See also ==
- Chord chart § Nashville notation
- Nashville tuning
- Numbered musical notation
