= 1930s in jazz =

Swing jazz emerged as a dominant form in American music, in which some virtuoso soloists became as famous as the band leaders. Key figures in developing the "big" jazz band included bandleaders and arrangers Count Basie, Cab Calloway, Jimmy and Tommy Dorsey, Duke Ellington, Benny Goodman, Fletcher Henderson, Earl Hines, Glenn Miller, and Artie Shaw. Duke Ellington and his band members composed numerous swing era hits that have become standards: "It Don't Mean a Thing (If It Ain't Got That Swing)" (1932), "Sophisticated Lady" (1933) and "Caravan" (1936), among others.

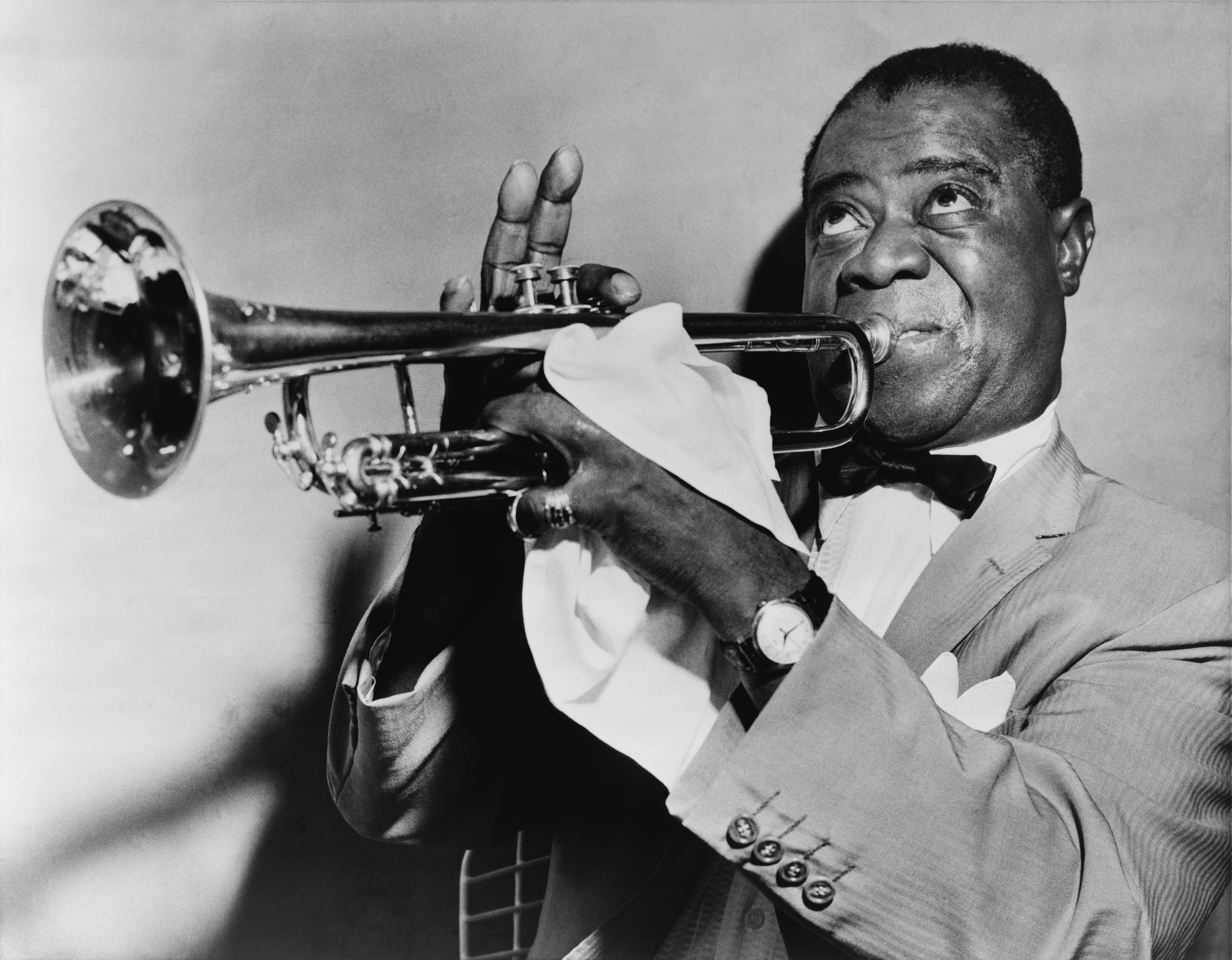
Trumpeter, bandleader and singer Louis Armstrong was a much-imitated innovator of early jazz.

Swing was also dance music. It was broadcast on the radio 'live' nightly across America for many years especially by Hines and his Grand Terrace Cafe Orchestra broadcasting coast-to-coast from Chicago, well placed for 'live' time-zones. Although it was a collective sound, swing also offered individual musicians a chance to 'solo' and improvise melodic, thematic solos which could at times be very complex and 'important' music. Over time, social structures regarding racial segregation began to relax in America: white bandleaders began to recruit black musicians and black bandleaders. In the mid-1930s, Benny Goodman hired pianist Teddy Wilson, vibraphonist Lionel Hampton, and guitarist Charlie Christian to join small groups. Kansas City Jazz in the 1930s as exemplified by tenor saxophonist Lester Young marked the transition from big bands to the bebop influence of the 1940s.

Outside of the United States the beginnings of a distinct European style of jazz emerged in France with the Quintette du Hot Club de France which began in 1934. Belgian guitar virtuoso Django Reinhardt popularised gypsy jazz, a mix of 1930s American swing, French dance hall "musette" and Eastern European folk with a languid, seductive feel. The main instruments are steel stringed guitar, violin, and double bass. Solos pass from one player to another as the guitar and bass play the role of the rhythm section. Some music researchers hold that it was Philadelphia's Eddie Lang (guitar) and Joe Venuti (violin) who pioneered the gypsy jazz form, which was brought to France after they had been heard live or on Okeh Records in the late 1920s.

Broadway theatre contributed some of the most popular standards of the 1930s, including George and Ira Gershwin's "Summertime" (1935), Richard Rodgers and Lorenz Hart's "My Funny Valentine" (1937) and Jerome Kern and Oscar Hammerstein II's "All the Things You Are" (1939). These songs still rank among the most recorded standards. Johnny Green's "Body and Soul" was introduced in Broadway and became a hit after Coleman Hawkins's 1939 recording. It is the most recorded jazz standard of all time. It is the bread and butter.

== 1930 ==
=== Standards ===
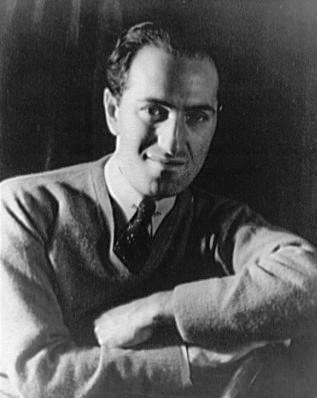
George Gershwin's songs have endured lasting popularity among both jazz and pop audiences. Among standards composed by him are "The Man I Love" (1924), "Embraceable You" (1930), "I Got Rhythm" (1930) and "Summertime" (1935).

Rhythm changes in the key of C
The chord progression from Gershwin's "I Got Rhythm". Sequenced stride piano version, with elaboration. No melody line.

- "Body and Soul" is a song composed by Johnny Green with lyrics by Frank Eyton, Edward Heyman and Robert Sour. The song was used in the successful Broadway revue Three's a Crowd and became an instant hit, despite being banned from the radio for almost a year for its sexually suggestive lyrics. The first jazz recording was by Louis Armstrong in 1930. Coleman Hawkins's 1939 recording consisted of three minutes of improvisation over the song's chord progression with only passing references to the melody. Hawkins's rendition was the first purely jazz recording that became a commercial hit and was inducted into the Grammy Hall of Fame in 1973. The song is the most recorded jazz standard of all time.
- "But Not for Me" is a song from the Broadway musical Girl Crazy, composed by George Gershwin with lyrics by Ira Gershwin. It was introduced by Ginger Rogers. The song failed to achieve significant pop success, charting only once in 1942. However, it became popular in the jazz world, especially for female vocalists.
- "Confessin'" is a song composed by Ellis Reynolds and Doc Daugherty, with lyrics by Al Neiburg. Louis Armstrong recorded it in 1930, and Rudy Vallée and Guy Lombardo both made the charts with their versions the same year. Saxophonist Lester Young recorded it several times during his career. Country singer Frank Ifield had a number one hit with the song in the United Kingdom in 1963. The song is also known as "I'm Confessin' (That I Love You)".
- "Embraceable You" is a song from the Broadway musical Girl Crazy, composed by George Gershwin with lyrics by Ira Gershwin. Originally written for an unfinished operetta East to West in 1928, it was introduced by Ginger Rogers and became a big hit. Billie Holiday's 1944 recording was inducted into the Grammy Hall of Fame in 2005.
- "Exactly Like You" is a song from the Broadway show Lew Leslie's International Revue, composed by Jimmy McHugh with lyrics by Dorothy Fields. It was introduced by Harry Richman and Gertrude Lawrence on stage. Louis Armstrong recorded the first jazz version in 1930. Benny Goodman's 1936 recording, sung by Lionel Hampton, revived interest in the song; the following year it was recorded by Count Basie and Quintette du Hot Club de France.
- "Georgia on My Mind" is a song composed by Hoagy Carmichael with lyrics by Stuart Gorrell. Bix Beiderbecke played cornet on the original 1930 recording by Hoagy Carmichael. Frankie Trumbauer recorded the first hit version of the song in 1931. Ray Charles's version on The Genius Hits the Road (1960) was a number one hit, won two Grammy Awards and is considered to be the definitive version of the song. The song was designated as the state song of Georgia in 1979.
- "I Got Rhythm" is a song from the Broadway musical Girl Crazy, composed by George Gershwin with lyrics by Ira Gershwin. First-timer Ethel Merman's performance on Girl Crazy stole the limelight from leading lady Ginger Rogers. The song's chord progression has been used in countless jazz compositions, and is commonly known as "rhythm changes". George Gershwin's last concert composition, Variations on "I Got Rhythm" was based on this song.
- "Love for Sale" is a song from the Broadway musical The New Yorkers, written by Cole Porter. Porter's prostitution-themed lyrics were considered bad taste at the time, and the song was banned from the radio. The ban, however, only increased the song's popularity. Porter himself was actually pleased that it could not be sung over the air. In the original musical the song was first sung by Kathryn Crawford and later by Elizabeth Welch. The song took time to catch on as a jazz standard, possibly because it was 72 measures long. When Sidney Bechet recorded it in 1947, the song was not yet a regular jazz number.
- "Memories of You" is a song from the musical revue Blackbirds of 1930, composed by Eubie Blake with lyrics by Andy Razaf. It was introduced by Minto Cato on Broadway and the first recording was made by Ethel Waters in 1930. Louis Armstrong's 1930 recording was Lionel Hampton's debut performance as a vibraphonist and rose to number 18 on the charts. Hampton later recorded the tune again with Benny Goodman's orchestra; this version has made the song a popular clarinet number.
- "Mood Indigo" is a jazz song composed by Barney Bigard and Duke Ellington, with lyrics by Irving Mills. Bigard has admitted borrowing parts of the song from a composition called "Dreamy Blues" by his teacher Lorenzo Tio. The lyrics were written by Mitchell Parish, who then sold them to Mills's publishing company for a fixed price. When the song became a hit, Parish was therefore left without royalties. Ellington's 1930 recording was inducted into the Grammy Hall of Fame in 1975.
- "On the Sunny Side of the Street" is a song from the Broadway musical Lew Leslie's International Revue, composed by Jimmy McHugh with lyrics by Dorothy Fields. Harry Richman sang it in the original revue. Although the musical was a flop, "On the Sunny Side of the Street" became instantly popular. Richman and Ted Lewis charted with it in 1930, and Louis Armstrong recorded his version in 1934. The song is readily associated with Armstrong today. Tommy Dorsey and Jo Stafford both brought the song to the charts in 1945. Jeremy Wilson of JazzStandards.com argues that the song may actually have been composed by Fats Waller, who then sold the rights for it.

=== Births ===
- April 16 – Herbie Mann

== 1931 ==
=== Standards ===
- "All of Me" is a song by Gerald Marks and Seymour Simons. It was introduced on the radio by vaudeville performer Belle Baker. Baker also performed the song on stage in Detroit's Fisher Theatre, reportedly breaking into tears in mid-performance. The first hit recording was made by Mildred Bailey with Paul Whiteman and His Orchestra, and by February 1932 both Louis Armstrong and Ben Selvin had risen to the charts with the song in addition to Whiteman. The song was rarely performed after 1932 until Frank Sinatra recorded it in 1948 and performed it in the 1952 film Meet Danny Wilson.
- "Beautiful Love" is a song composed by Wayne King, Egbert Van Alstyne and Victor Young with lyrics by Haven Gillespie.
- "I Surrender Dear" is a song from the film of the same name, composed by Harry Barris with lyrics by Gordon Clifford. Bing Crosby performed the song in the film, and his recording with the Gus Arnheim Orchestra became his first solo hit and helped him get a contract for his first radio show. The first jazz vocalist to record the song was Louis Armstrong in 1931. Thelonious Monk recorded it as the sole standard on his 1956 album Brilliant Corners.
- "Just Friends" is a ballad composed by John Klenner with lyrics by Sam M. Lewis. It was introduced by Red McKenzie and His Orchestra and popularized in modern jazz by Charlie Parker's 1950 recording. Chet Baker's 1955 version is considered the definitive vocal performance.
- "Lazy River" is a song by Hoagy Carmichael and Sidney Arodin. Online music guide Allmusic describes it as "[e]asily one of the true pop classics of all time". It is also known as "Up a Lazy River" or "Up the Lazy River".
- "Out of Nowhere" is a song composed by Johnny Green with lyrics by Edward Heyman. It was introduced by Bing Crosby and became his first number one hit as a solo artist. Coleman Hawkins's 1937 recording with Benny Carter and Django Reinhardt was the definitive version for years. The song's harmony has been reused in multiple jazz compositions, such as Tadd Dameron's "Casbah" and Fats Navarro's "Nostalgia".
- "When It's Sleepy Time Down South" is a song by Clarence Muse, Leon René and Otis René. Louis Armstrong used it as his theme song. It is also known as "Sleepy Time Down South".
- "When Your Lover Has Gone" is a song from the film Blonde Crazy, written by Einar Aaron Swan. Gene Austin, Louis Armstrong, Ethel Waters and Benny Goodman all recorded the song in 1931, and Austin's rendition was the first to hit the charts.

== 1932 ==
=== Standards ===
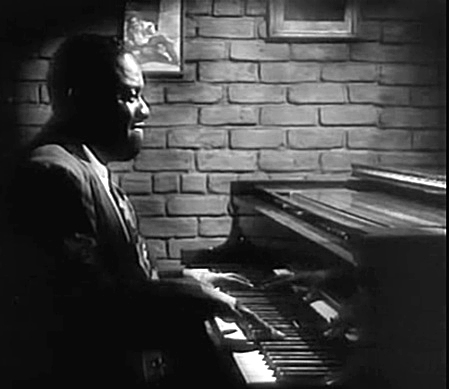
Virtuoso pianist Art Tatum mostly played Broadway and popular standards. He usually radically reworked the songs and had the ability to make standards sound like new compositions. Tatum's influential piano solos include "Tiger Rag", "Willow Weep for Me" and "Over the Rainbow".

- "Alone Together" is a ballad from the Broadway musical Flying Colors, composed by Arthur Schwartz with lyrics by Howard Dietz. It was introduced by Jean Sargent on stage, and Artie Shaw made the first jazz recording in 1939.
- "April in Paris" is a Broadway show tune from Walk a Little Faster, composed by Vernon Duke with lyrics by Yip Harburg. Count Basie's 1955 recording was inducted into the Grammy Hall of Fame in 1985.
- "How Deep Is the Ocean (How High Is the Sky)" is a song by Irving Berlin. It was first made a hit by Paul Whiteman and His Orchestra with vocalist Jack Fulton. The song's jazz popularity was established by the recordings of Benny Goodman (1941) and Coleman Hawkins (1943).
- "I Don't Stand a Ghost of a Chance With You" is a song composed by Victor Young with lyrics by Bing Crosby and Ned Washington. The first recording by Crosby became an immediate hit, reaching no. 5 on the pop singles chart. It is also known as "Ghost of a Chance".
- "It Don't Mean a Thing (If It Ain't Got That Swing)" is a jazz song composed by Duke Ellington with lyrics by Irving Mills. The recordings of Ivie Anderson (with the Duke Ellington Band) and the Mills Brothers popularized the song. Its title introduced the term "swing" into common usage and gave name to the swing era.
- "New Orleans" is a song by Hoagy Carmichael. First recorded by Bennie Moten's Kansas City Orchestra and the Casa Loma Orchestra as an up-tempo number, the song only achieved success after Carmichael recorded a slower version with vocalist Ella Logan. The song was based on the chord progressions of "You Took Advantage of Me" and "Wrap Your Troubles in Dreams".
- "Night and Day" is a song from the musical Gay Divorce, written by Cole Porter. It was introduced on stage by Fred Astaire, who also sung it in the 1934 film The Gay Divorcee, based on the musical. The song became Frank Sinatra's first hit under his own name.
- "Willow Weep for Me" is a song by Ann Ronell. It was first recorded by Ted Fio Rito and His Orchestra and, two weeks later, by Paul Whiteman and His Orchestra. The definitive instrumental version was Art Tatum's 1949 piano solo recording. Count Basie's "Taxi War Dance" was based on the song's harmony. Ronell dedicated the song to George Gershwin.

== 1933 ==
=== Standards ===
- "Don't Blame Me" is a song composed by Jimmy McHugh with lyrics by Dorothy Fields. It was introduced in the musical revue Clowns in Clover and included in the 1933 film Dinner at Eight. The film is often mistakenly given as the song's origin. The first hit recordings were by Guy Lombardo and Ethel Waters in 1933.
- "Drop Me Off in Harlem" is a jazz song composed by Duke Ellington with lyrics by Nick Kenny.
- "I Cover the Waterfront" is a song composed by Johnny Green with lyrics by Edward Heyman. It was included in the score of the film of the same name.
- "It's Only a Paper Moon" is a song from the Broadway show The Great Magoo, composed by Harold Arlen with lyrics by Yip Harburg and Billy Rose. Originally titled "If You Believed in Me", the current title was introduced in the 1933 film Take a Chance.
- "One Morning in May" is a song composed by Hoagy Carmichael with lyrics by Mitchell Parish.
- "Sophisticated Lady" is a jazz composition by Duke Ellington. Lyrics were later added by Irving Mills and Mitchell Parish. Lawrence Brown and Toby Hardwick have claimed to have written parts of the tune.
- "Yesterdays" is a song from the Broadway musical Roberta, composed by Jerome Kern with lyrics by Otto Harbach. It was introduced by Irene Dunne. Not as popular in the pop world as "Smoke Gets in Your Eyes" from the same musical, it has enjoyed much more success in jazz circles. The song is often associated with Billie Holiday, who recorded it in 1944.

== 1934 ==
=== Standards ===
- "Autumn in New York" is a song from the Broadway musical Thumbs Up!, written by Vernon Duke. Introduced on stage by J. Harold Murray, it was not until 1947 that the song became a hit with Jo Stafford's and Frank Sinatra's recordings.
- "Blue Moon" is a song composed by Richard Rodgers with lyrics by Lorenz Hart. Originally named "Prayer" and meant for the musical film Hollywood Party, the lyrics were rewritten two times for Manhattan Melodrama; eventually it was sung by Shirley Ross as "The Bad in Every Man". The song was later released commercially as "Blue Moon", with yet another set of lyrics. The final version was disliked by Hart but eventually became his most popular song. Apart from pop and jazz popularity, the song crossed over to rock and roll with the recordings by Elvis Presley and The Marcels.
- "Solitude" is a jazz song composed by Duke Ellington with lyrics by Eddie DeLange. Irving Mills received co-credit for the lyrics as Ellington's agent. Ellington claimed to have composed the song in 20 minutes. It is also known as "In My Solitude".
- "Smoke Gets in Your Eyes" is a song from the Broadway musical Roberta, composed by Jerome Kern with lyrics by Otto Harbach. Paul Whiteman and His Orchestra's recording reached number one on the pop charts in 1934. A million-selling, Billboard Hot 100 number one version was recorded by doo-wop group The Platters in 1958.
- "Stars Fell on Alabama" is a song composed by Frank Perkins with lyrics by Mitchell Parish. The first jazz recording was made by Benny Goodman in 1934.
- "Stompin' at the Savoy" is a jazz song composed by Edgar Sampson with lyrics by Andy Razaf. Originally recorded by Chick Webb in 1934, it was popularized by Benny Goodman's 1936 recording. Both Webb and Goodman received composer co-credit for the song.

== 1935 ==
=== Standards ===
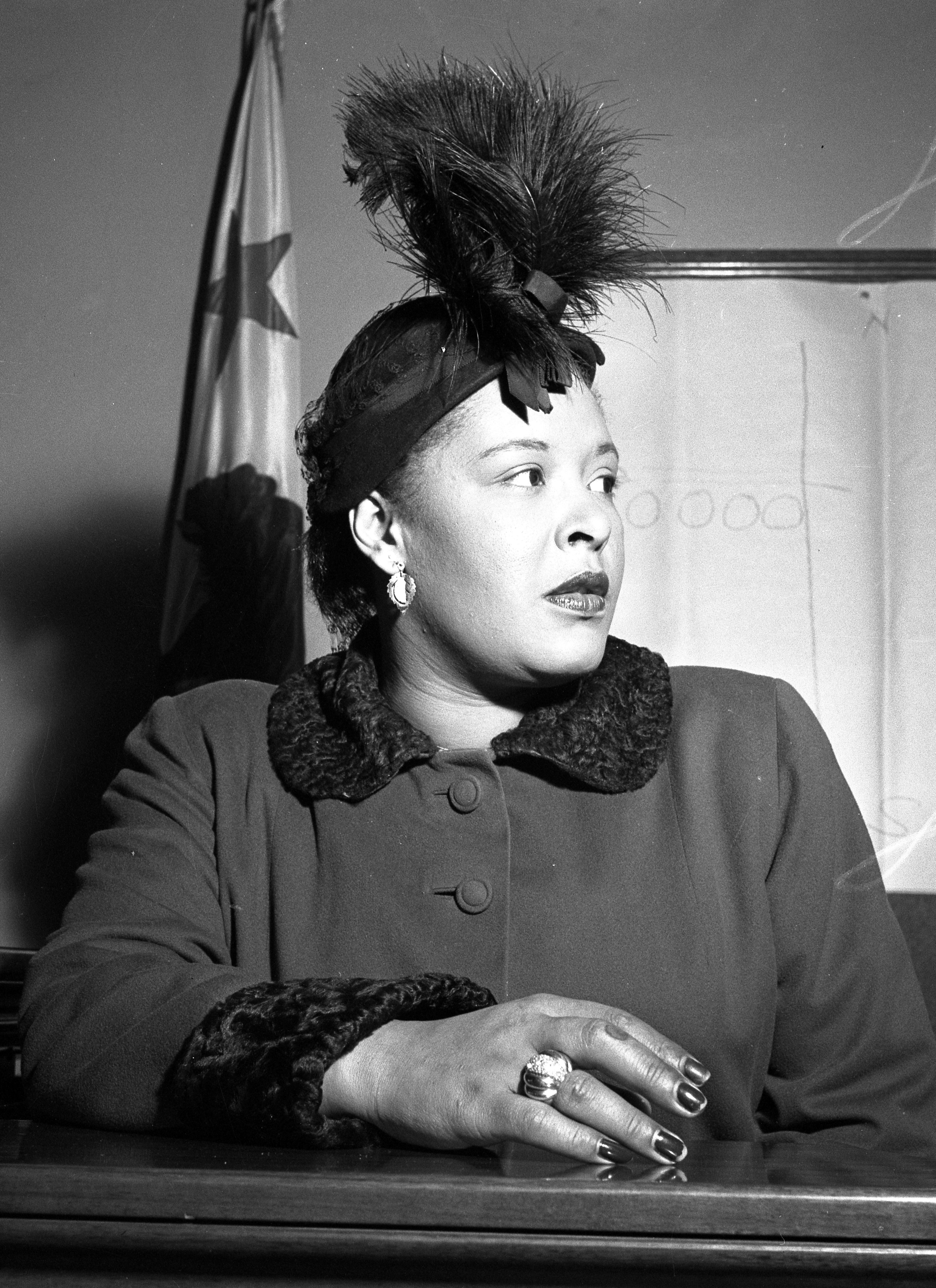
Many 1930s standards were popularized by jazz singer Billie Holiday's recordings, including "These Foolish Things", "Embraceable You", "Yesterdays".

- "Begin the Beguine is a show tune from the Broadway musical Jubilee, written by Cole Porter. It was popularized by Artie Shaw in 1938. It is considerably longer than the average song of the time (104 bars instead of the usual 32 bar AABA form). Fred Astaire and Eleanor Powell's tap dance to the tune in the 1940 film Broadway Melody of 1940 became one of the most popular dance scenes on film.
- "In a Sentimental Mood" is a jazz song composed by Duke Ellington with lyrics by Manny Kurtz and Irving Mills. Ellington's biographer James Lincoln Collier argues that the melody was originally composed by Toby Hardwick. The song is among Ellington's most popular compositions, and has been described "Simply the most beautiful song ever written" and "The perfect soundtrack for falling in love."
- "Just One of Those Things" is a show tune from the Broadway musical Jubilee written by Cole Porter. It is also known as "It Was Just One of Those Things".
- "My Romance" is a song from the Broadway musical Jumbo, composed by Richard Rodgers with lyrics by Lorenz Hart. Ben Webster has recorded the song several times as a ballad, and the definitive medium-tempo version is the 1961 recording by Bill Evans Trio on Waltz for Debby.
- "Summertime" is a song from the musical Porgy and Bess, composed by George Gershwin with lyrics from a poem by DuBose Heyward. Sidney Bechet's 1939 hit record helped establish the Blue Note record label. One of the best-known renditions is by Miles Davis and Gil Evans on Porgy and Bess (1958).
- "These Foolish Things" is a song from the British musical comedy Spread it Abroad, written by Harry Link, Holt Marvell and Jack Strachey. Billie Holiday's 1936 recording with Teddy Wilson and His Orchestra is considered the definitive version of the song. It is also known as "These Foolish Things Remind Me of You".
- "What a Little Moonlight Can Do" is a song by Harry M. Woods. It was originally recorded by Billie Holiday.

=== Births ===
- April 16 -Dudley Moore, English jazz and classical musician and actor
- June 6-Grant Green, American jazz guitarist and composer

== 1936 ==
=== Standards ===
- "Caravan" is a jazz song with Middle Eastern influences, composed by Duke Ellington and Juan Tizol with lyrics by Irving Mills.
- "I Can't Get Started" is a song from the Broadway musical Ziegfeld Follies of 1936, composed by Vernon Duke with lyrics by Ira Gershwin. It was introduced by Bob Hope. Bunny Berigan's 1937 recording was inducted into the Grammy Hall of Fame in 1975. It is also known as "I Can't Get Started with You".
- "Pennies from Heaven" is a song from the film of the same name, composed by Arthur Johnston with lyrics by Johnny Burke. It was introduced by Bing Crosby. Lester Young recorded several versions of the song in the 1940s and 1950s.
- "Sing, Sing, Sing" is a song written by Louis Prima. It is often associated with swing jazz bands, especially Benny Goodman, who recorded it in 1936. It is also known as "Sing, Sing, Sing (With a Swing)".
- "There Is No Greater Love" is a song composed by Isham Jones with lyrics by Marty Symes. It was the Isham Jones Orchestra's last hit before Woody Herman took over as bandleader.
- "The Way You Look Tonight" is a song from the film Swing Time, composed by Jerome Kern with lyrics by Dorothy Fields. Introduced by Fred Astaire, the song won the Academy Award for Best Original Song. Johnny Griffin's 1957 performance with John Coltrane and Hank Mobley on A Blowin' Session has been called Griffin's "defining moment".
- "Why Don't You Do Right?" is a blues song by Kansas Joe McCoy. Originally titled "The Weed Smoker's Dream", McCoy rewrote the lyrics for Lil Green, who recorded it with Big Bill Broonzy in 1941. Peggy Lee recorded a hit version with Benny Goodman in 1945; this version was performed in Who Framed Roger Rabbit by Jessica Rabbit at the Ink and Paint Club.

== 1937 ==
=== Standards ===
- "Azure" is a jazz song composed by Duke Ellington with lyrics by Irving Mills.
- "Easy Living" is a ballad from a film of the same name, composed by Ralph Rainger with lyrics by Leo Robin. The first hit version was recorded by Billie Holiday with Teddy Wilson's Orchestra.
- "A Foggy Day" is a song from the musical film A Damsel in Distress, composed by George Gershwin with lyrics by Ira Gershwin. It was introduced by Fred Astaire and originally called "A Foggy Day in London Town".
- "Have You Met Miss Jones?" is a ballad from the Broadway comedy I'd Rather Be Right, composed by Richard Rodgers with lyrics by Lorenz Hart. It was introduced on stage by Joy Hodges and Austin Marshall. The song's bridge may have served as an inspiration to John Coltrane's "Giant Steps" (1959). Female singers sometimes change the title to "Have You Met Sir Jones?".
- "I Ain't Got Nothin' But the Blues" is a jazz song composed by Duke Ellington with lyrics by Don George.
- "Minor Swing" is a Gypsy jazz composition by Django Reinhardt and Stéphane Grappelli.
- "My Funny Valentine" is a show tune from the Broadway musical Babes in Arms, composed by Richard Rodgers with lyrics by Lorenz Hart. Frank Sinatra recorded a hit version in 1955, and the song became later readily associated with his live performances. Other influential versions were recorded by Chet Baker (on My Funny Valentine, 1954) and Miles Davis (on Cookin', 1956).
- "Nice Work If You Can Get It was written by George and Ira Gershwin for the musical film A Damsel in Distress. It was introduced in the film by Fred Astaire and has been recorded many times by jazz singers and pianists.
- "Once in a While" is a song composed by Michael Edwards with lyrics by Bud Green. It became a number one hit for Tommy Dorsey and His Orchestra and later for The Chimes and Patti Page. Rahsaan Roland Kirk is credited with reviving interest in the song among jazz musicians with his 1960s recording.
- "Some Day My Prince Will Come" is a song from Walt Disney's animated film Snow White and the Seven Dwarfs, composed by Frank Churchill with lyrics by Larry Morey. The first jazz recordings were by Donald Byrd and The Dave Brubeck Quartet in 1957. Bill Evans has recorded the song several times. Miles Davis's rendition on Someday My Prince Will Come (1961) is notable for John Coltrane's memorable solo.
- "They Can't Take That Away from Me" is a song from the musical film Shall We Dance, composed by George Gershwin with lyrics by Ira Gershwin. It was introduced by Fred Astaire, whose recording with the Johnny Green Orchestra stayed at number one for ten weeks. A famous version was recorded by Charlie Parker in 1950 and released on Charlie Parker with Strings.

== 1938 ==
=== Standards ===
- "Cherokee" is a jazz song written by Ray Noble. Originally a part of a larger Indian Suite, it became a hit for Charlie Barnet in 1939 as an instrumental. Charlie Parker used the song's chord progression in his 1945 song "Ko-Ko". The song is also known as "Indian Love Song".
- "Heart and Soul" is a song composed by Hoagy Carmichael with lyrics by Frank Loesser. It was first performed by Larry Clinton and His Orchestra featuring Bea Wain.
- "Love Is Here to Stay" is a song from the musical film The Goldwyn Follies, composed by George Gershwin with lyrics by Ira Gershwin. It gained little attention from The Goldwyn Follies and is better known for the 1952 film An American in Paris. It was the last song George Gershwin composed. The song was originally titled "Our Love Is Here to Stay"; Ira Gershwin later said that he would have wanted to change the title back to the original one if the song hadn't already become popular under its new name.
- "The Nearness of You" is a song composed by Hoagy Carmichael with lyrics by Ned Washington. It was meant to be included in the film Romance in the Rough, which was never produced. The first hit version was made by Glenn Miller and His Orchestra in 1940. Sarah Vaughan recorded the song in 1949 and several times afterwards.
- "Old Folks" was composed by Willard Robison with lyrics by Dedette Lee Hill, the wife and occasional colleague of Billy Hill. It has been recorded many times by vocalists and instrumentalists and its most famous jazz version is by trumpeter Miles Davis on Someday My Prince Will Come (1961).
- "One O'Clock Jump" is an instrumental twelve-bar blues composition by Count Basie. It was used as the theme song of Basie's band. The song was partly written by saxophonist Buster Smith, but co-credit was denied by Basie. An influential performance was by Benny Goodman in his 1938 Carnegie Hall concert.
- "Prelude to a Kiss" is a jazz ballad composed by Duke Ellington with lyrics by Irving Mills and Mack Gordon. It was first recorded as an instrumental by the Duke Ellington Orchestra featuring Johnny Hodges, and later by Johnny Hodges and His Orchestra with vocalist Mary McHugh.
- "September Song" is a song from the Broadway musical Knickerbocker Holiday, composed by Kurt Weill with lyrics by Maxwell Anderson. It was introduced by Walter Huston, and later hit recordings were made by Frank Sinatra in 1946 and Sarah Vaughan in 1954.
- "You Go to My Head" is a song composed by J. Fred Coots with lyrics by Haven Gillespie. It was introduced by Glen Gray and the Casa Loma Orchestra. The song's harmonic sophistication has been praised by critics, who often describe Coots as a "one-hit wonder" despite his "Santa Claus Is Coming to Town" being even more popular in terms of mass appeal.

== 1939 ==
=== Standards ===
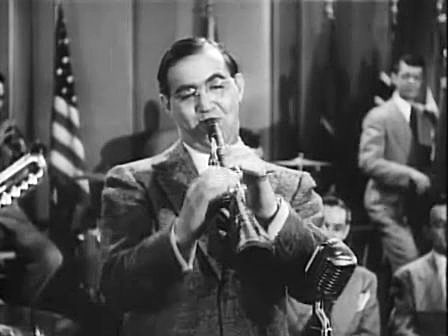
Clarinetist and bandleader Benny Goodman popularized many of the 1930s standards, including "Darn That Dream", How Deep Is the Ocean, and "Stompin' at the Savoy".

- "All the Things You Are" is a song from the Broadway musical Very Warm for May, composed by Jerome Kern with lyrics by Oscar Hammerstein II. Kern first felt the song, with its constantly shifting tonal centers, was too complex for mass appeal. However, it has enjoyed lasting popularity since then and is now one of the most recorded standards. It has been described as "the most perfectly constructed of all popular standards". The song's chord progression has been used for such tunes as "Bird of Paradise" by Charlie Parker and "Prince Albert" by Kenny Dorham.
- "Darn That Dream" is a song from the Broadway musical Swingin' the Dream, composed by Jimmy Van Heusen with lyrics by Eddie DeLange. Although the musical was a disappointment, Benny Goodman's version of the song featuring vocalist Mildred Bailey was a number one hit.
- "Frenesi" is a Latin jazz composition by Alberto Dominguez. Originally composed for the marimba, jazz arrangements were later made by Leonard Whitcup and others. A 1940 hit version recorded by Artie Shaw with an arrangement by William Grant Still was inducted into the Grammy Hall of Fame in 2000.
- "I Didn't Know What Time It Was" is a song from the musical Too Many Girls, composed by Richard Rodgers with lyrics by Lorenz Hart. It was introduced on stage by Richard Kollmar and Marcy Westcott. Benny Goodman recorded the first jazz version in 1939 with vocalist Louise Tobin.
- "I Thought About You" is a song composed by Jimmy Van Heusen with lyrics by Johnny Mercer. Mildred Bailey recorded the first hit version with the Benny Goodman Orchestra.
- "In the Mood" is a jazz song composed by Joe Garland with lyrics by Andy Razaf. It was popularized by Glenn Miller. The composition was based on a tune called "Tar Paper Stomp" by Wingy Manone.
- Moonlight Serenade was composed by Glenn Miller with lyrics added later by Mitchell Parish. The recording reached no. 3 on Billboard and was the no. 5 record on the 1939 Billboard year-end list of the top recordings of 1939.
- "Over the Rainbow" is a ballad from the film The Wizard of Oz, composed by Harold Arlen with lyrics by Yip Harburg. Introduced by Judy Garland on screen, the song was an immediate hit: four different versions, including Garland's, rose to top ten within a month after the film's release. An influential piano solo recording was made by Art Tatum in 1955, and a live solo piano recording was released by singer-songwriter Tori Amos in 1996. The song is also known as "Somewhere over the Rainbow".
- "Something to Live For" is a jazz ballad written by Billy Strayhorn. Strayhorn was Duke Ellington's pianist, and Ellington was co-credited with the song. Ella Fitzgerald has called it her favourite song.
- "What's New?" is a song composed by Bob Haggart with lyrics by Johnny Burke. It was originally an instrumental titled "I'm Free", written when Haggart was playing in Bob Crosby's Orchestra. The song was introduced by Crosby, and other hit versions from 1939 include Bing Crosby's and Benny Goodman's renditions. Australian singer Catherine O'Hara recorded the song in 1966 with her own lyrics, also titled "I'm Free".
- "Woodchopper's Ball" is a jazz composition by Joe Bishop and Woody Herman. Introduced by the Woody Herman Orchestra, it was the band's biggest hit. The original recording was inducted into the Grammy Hall of Fame in 2002.

== Bibliography ==
- The New Real Book, Volume I. Sher Music. 1988. ISBN 0-9614701-4-3.
- The New Real Book, Volume II. Sher Music. 1991. ISBN 0-9614701-7-8.
- The New Real Book, Volume III. Sher Music. 1995. ISBN 1-883217-30-X.
- The Real Book, Volume I (6th ed.). Hal Leonard. 2004. ISBN 0-634-06038-4.
- The Real Book, Volume II (2nd ed.). Hal Leonard. 2007. ISBN 1-4234-2452-2.
- The Real Book, Volume III (2nd ed.). Hal Leonard. 2006. ISBN 0-634-06136-4.
- The Real Jazz Book. Warner Bros. ISBN 978-91-85041-36-7.
- The Real Vocal Book, Volume I. Hal Leonard. 2006. ISBN 0-634-06080-5.
