= List of 1930s jazz standards =

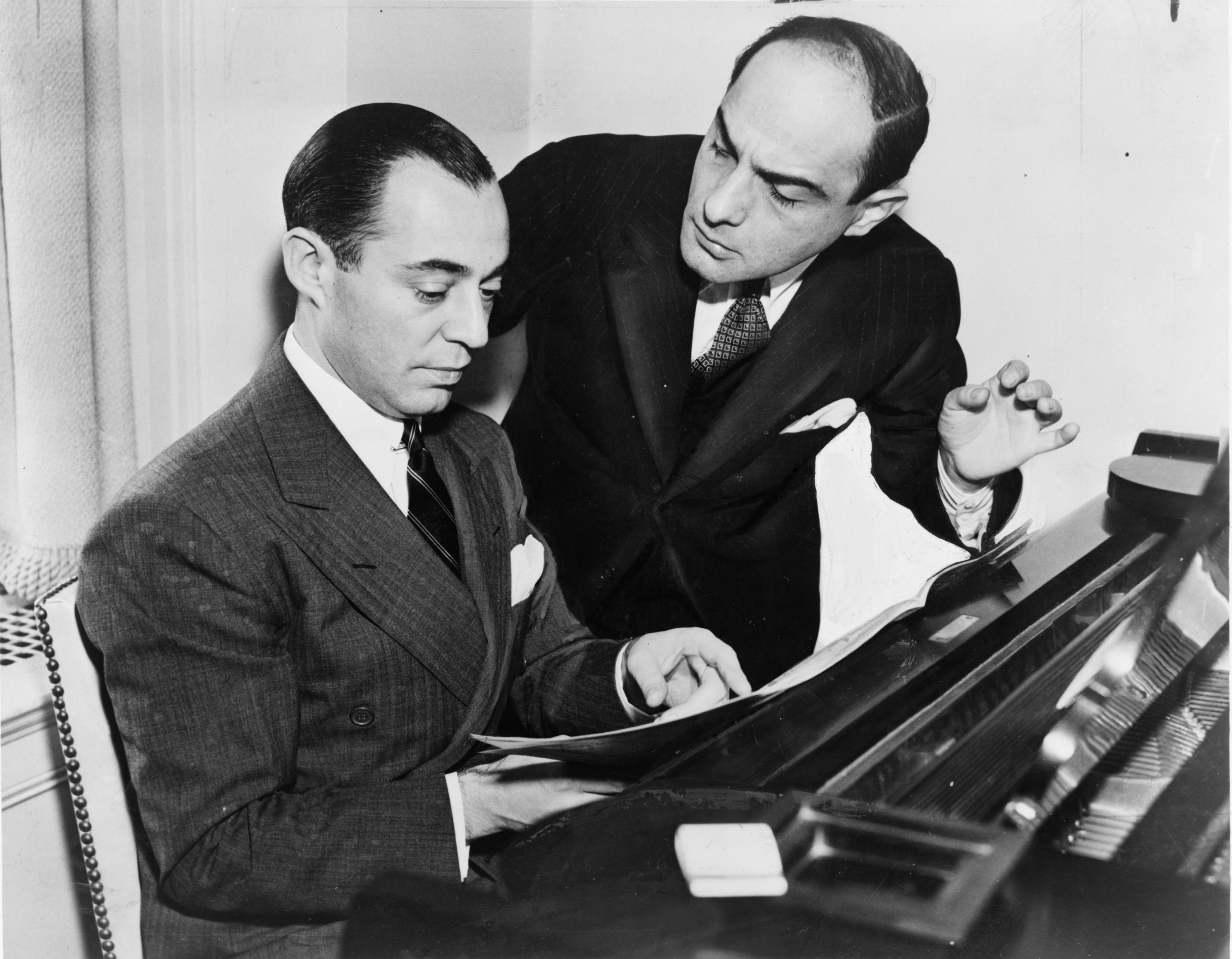
Richard Rodgers (left) and Lorenz Hart were responsible for a large number of 1930s standards, including "Blue Moon" (1934), "My Romance" (1935) and "My Funny Valentine" (1937).

Jazz standards are musical compositions that are widely known, performed and recorded by jazz artists as part of the genre's musical repertoire. This list includes compositions written in the 1930s that are considered standards by at least one major fake book publication or reference work. Some of the tunes listed were already well known standards by the 1940s, while others were popularized later. Where appropriate, the years when the most influential recordings of a song were made are indicated in the list.

Broadway theatre contributed some of the most popular standards of the 1930s, including George and Ira Gershwin's "Summertime" (1935), Richard Rodgers and Lorenz Hart's "My Funny Valentine" (1937) and Jerome Kern and Oscar Hammerstein II's "All the Things You Are" (1939). These songs still rank among the most recorded standards. Johnny Green's "Body and Soul" was used in a Broadway show and became a hit after Coleman Hawkins's 1939 recording. It is the most recorded jazz standard of all time.

In the 1930s, swing jazz emerged as a dominant form in American music. Duke Ellington and his band members composed numerous swing era hits that have become standards: "It Don't Mean a Thing (If It Ain't Got That Swing)" (1932), "Sophisticated Lady" (1933) and "Caravan" (1936), among others. Other influential bandleaders of this period were Benny Goodman, Louis Armstrong, Cab Calloway and Fletcher Henderson. Goodman's band became well known from the radio show Let's Dance and in 1937 introduced a number of jazz standards to a wide audience in the first jazz concert performed in Carnegie Hall.

== 1930 ==
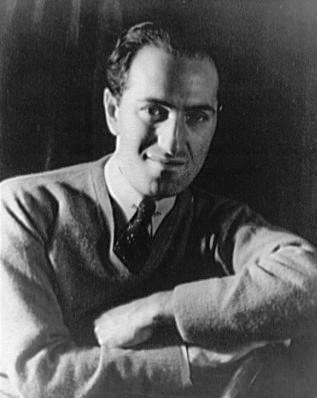
George Gershwin's songs have gained lasting popularity among both jazz and pop audiences. Among standards composed by him are "The Man I Love" (1924), "Embraceable You" (1930), "I Got Rhythm" (1930) and "Summertime" (1935).

Rhythm changes in the key of C
The chord progression from Gershwin's "I Got Rhythm". Sequenced stride piano version, with elaboration. The chord progression, known as "rhythm changes", has been used as the basis of numerous jazz compositions, including many standards.

- "Body and Soul" is a song composed by Johnny Green with lyrics by Frank Eyton, Edward Heyman and Robert Sour. The song was used in the successful Broadway revue Three's a Crowd and became an instant hit, despite being banned from the radio for almost a year for its sexually suggestive lyrics. The first jazz recording was by Louis Armstrong in 1930. Coleman Hawkins' 1939 recording consisted of three minutes of improvisation over the song's chord progression with only passing references to the melody. Hawkins's rendition was the first purely jazz recording that became a commercial hit and was inducted into the Grammy Hall of Fame in 1973. The song is the most recorded jazz standard of all time.
- "But Not for Me" was introduced by Ginger Rogers in the Broadway musical Girl Crazy. It was composed by George Gershwin with lyrics by Ira Gershwin. The song failed to achieve significant pop success, charting only once in 1942. However, it became popular in the jazz world, especially for female vocalists.
- "Confessin'" was composed by Ellis Reynolds and Doc Daugherty, with lyrics by Al J. Neiburg. Louis Armstrong recorded it in 1930, and Rudy Vallée and Guy Lombardo both made the charts with their versions the same year. Saxophonist Lester Young recorded it several times during his career. Country singer Frank Ifield had a number one hit with the song in the United Kingdom in 1963. The song is also known as "I'm Confessin' (That I Love You)".
- "Embraceable You" was originally composed by George Gershwin for an unfinished operetta East to West in 1928. It became a big hit after Ginger Rogers introduced it in the Broadway musical Girl Crazy, and was first recorded by Fred Rich and His Orchestra. Lyrics were written by Ira Gershwin. Billie Holiday's 1944 recording was inducted into the Grammy Hall of Fame in 2005.
- "Exactly Like You" was sung by Harry Richman and Gertrude Lawrence in Broadway show Lew Leslie's International Revue. It was composed by Jimmy McHugh with lyrics by Dorothy Fields. Louis Armstrong recorded the first jazz version in 1930. Benny Goodman's 1936 recording, sung by Lionel Hampton, revived interest in the song; the following year it was recorded by Count Basie and Quintette du Hot Club de France.
- "Georgia on My Mind" is a song composed by Hoagy Carmichael with lyrics by Stuart Gorrell. Bix Beiderbecke played cornet on Carmichael's original 1930 recording. Frankie Trumbauer recorded the first hit version of the song in 1931. Ray Charles's version on The Genius Hits the Road (1960) was a number one hit, won two Grammy Awards and is considered to be the definitive version of the song. The song was designated as the state song of Georgia in 1979.
- "I Got Rhythm" was composed by George Gershwin for the Broadway musical Girl Crazy, with lyrics by Ira Gershwin. First-timer Ethel Merman's performance on Girl Crazy stole the limelight from leading lady Ginger Rogers. The song's I-vi-ii-V7 chord progression has been used in countless jazz compositions, and is commonly known as "rhythm changes". George Gershwin's last concert composition, Variations on "I Got Rhythm" was based on this song.
- "Love for Sale" is a song from Cole Porter's Broadway musical The New Yorkers. Its prostitution-themed lyrics were considered bad taste at the time, and the song was banned from the radio. The ban, however, only increased the song's popularity. Porter himself was actually pleased that it could not be sung over the air. In the original musical the song was first sung by Kathryn Crawford and later by Elizabeth Welch. It was first recorded by Fred Waring and His Pennsylvanians. The song took time to catch on as a jazz standard, possibly because it was 72 measures long. When Sidney Bechet recorded it in 1947, the song was not yet a regular jazz number.
- "Memories of You" first appeared in the musical revue Blackbirds of 1930. It was composed by Eubie Blake and lyrics were written by Andy Razaf. It was introduced by Minto Cato on Broadway and the first recording was made by Ethel Waters in 1930. Louis Armstrong's 1930 recording was Lionel Hampton's debut performance as a vibraphonist and rose to number 18 on the charts. Hampton later recorded the tune again with Benny Goodman's jazz orchestra; this version has made the song a popular clarinet number.
- "Mood Indigo" is a jazz song composed by Barney Bigard and Duke Ellington, with lyrics by Irving Mills. Bigard has admitted borrowing parts of the song from a composition called "Dreamy Blues" by his teacher Lorenzo Tio. The lyrics were written by Mitchell Parish, who then sold them to Mills's publishing company for a fixed price. When the song became a hit, Parish was therefore left without royalties. Ellington's 1930 recording was inducted into the Grammy Hall of Fame in 1975.
- "On the Sunny Side of the Street" was written by composer Jimmy McHugh and lyricist Dorothy Fields for the Broadway musical Lew Leslie's International Revue. Harry Richman sang it in the original revue. Although the musical was a flop, "On the Sunny Side of the Street" became instantly popular. Richman and Ted Lewis charted with it in 1930, and Louis Armstrong recorded his version in 1934. The song is readily associated with Armstrong today. Tommy Dorsey and Jo Stafford both brought the song to the charts in 1945. Jeremy Wilson argues that the song may actually have been composed by Fats Waller, who then sold the rights for it.

== 1931 ==
- "All of Me" was written by Gerald Marks and Seymour Simons. It was introduced on the radio by vaudeville performer Belle Baker who also performed the song on stage in Detroit's Fisher Theatre, reportedly breaking into tears in mid-performance. The first hit recording was made by Mildred Bailey with Paul Whiteman and His Orchestra, and by February 1932 both Louis Armstrong and Ben Selvin had risen to the charts with the song in addition to Whiteman. The song was rarely performed after 1932 until Frank Sinatra recorded it in 1948 and performed it in the 1952 film Meet Danny Wilson.
- "Beautiful Love" is a popular song composed by Wayne King, Victor Young and Egbert Van Alstyne with lyrics by Haven Gillespie. It was introduced by the Wayne King Orchestra in 1931.
- "I Surrender Dear" is the title song of a 1931 film starring Bing Crosby. It was composed by Harry Barris with lyrics by Gordon Clifford. Bing Crosby performed the song in the film, and his recording with the Gus Arnheim Orchestra became his first solo hit and helped him get a contract for his first radio show. The first jazz vocalist to record the song was Louis Armstrong in 1931. Thelonious Monk recorded it as the sole standard on his 1956 album Brilliant Corners.
- "Just Friends" is a ballad composed by John Klenner with lyrics by Sam M. Lewis. It was introduced by Red McKenzie and His Orchestra. The song rose to the charts twice in 1932; Russ Columbo's recording with Leonard Joy's Orchestra peaked at number fourteen, as did a rendition by Ben Selvin and His Orchestra later the same year. Popularized in modern jazz by Charlie Parker's 1950 recording, the song became popular among West Coast cool jazz artists in the mid-1950s. Chet Baker's 1955 version is considered the definitive vocal performance.
- "Lazy River", a song by Hoagy Carmichael and Sidney Arodin, was a hit for the Mills Brothers in 1941. The Si Zentner Orchestra recorded it in 1962 and used it as their theme song. Online music guide Allmusic describes it as "[e]asily one of the true pop classics of all time". It is also known as "Up a Lazy River" or "Up the Lazy River".
- "Out of Nowhere" was introduced by Bing Crosby and became his first number one hit as a solo artist. The lyrics for the Johnny Green composition were written by Edward Heyman. Coleman Hawkins's 1937 recording with Benny Carter and Django Reinhardt was long the definitive version. The song's harmony has been reused in many jazz compositions, such as Tadd Dameron's "Casbah" and Fats Navarro's "Nostalgia".
- "When It's Sleepy Time Down South" is a song about the Great Migration, written by Clarence Muse, Leon René and Otis René. It was originally offered to Duke Ellington, who did not consider the song to be his style and declined. Louis Armstrong later adopted it as his theme song and recorded it almost a hundred times during his career. The song is also known as "Sleepy Time Down South".
- "When Your Lover Has Gone" was written by Einar Aaron Swan for the film Blonde Crazy. Louis Armstrong made the first jazz recording of the song in 1931. The same year it was recorded by Gene Austin, Ethel Waters and Benny Goodman, and Austin's rendition was the first to hit the charts. Frank Sinatra included the song on his 1955 album In the Wee Small Hours. Sarah Vaughan made an uptempo recording in 1962 with Count Basie's band.

== 1932 ==
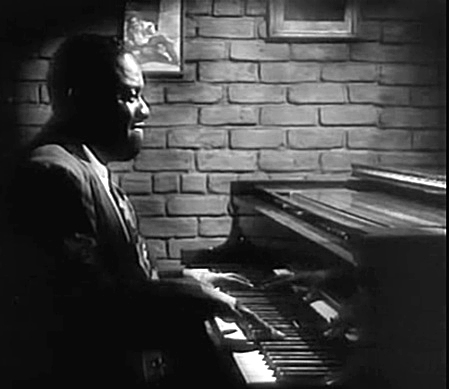
Virtuoso pianist Art Tatum mostly played Broadway and popular standards. He usually radically reworked the songs and had the ability to make standards sound like new compositions. Tatum's influential piano solos include "Tiger Rag", "Willow Weep for Me" and "Over the Rainbow".

- "Alone Together" is a ballad from Arthur Schwartz and Howard Dietz's Broadway musical Flying Colors. It was introduced by Jean Sargent on stage. A rendition by Leo Reisman and His Orchestra charted in 1932, and Artie Shaw made the first jazz recording in 1939. Dizzy Gillespie borrowed the harmony from the song's bridge for his 1942 composition "A Night in Tunisia".
- "April in Paris" is a Broadway show tune from Walk a Little Faster, composed by Vernon Duke with lyrics by Yip Harburg. It was sung by Evelyn Hoey in the musical, but did not become popular until after the Broadway production ended and blues singer Marian Chase started including it in her repertoire. The first recording was by Freddy Martin and His Orchestra in December 1933. Thelonious Monk's 1947 piano trio rendition helped popularize the song as a jazz vehicle. Count Basie's 1955 recording became his biggest hit and was inducted into the Grammy Hall of Fame in 1985.
- "How Deep Is the Ocean? (How High Is the Sky?)", a song written by Irving Berlin, was first made a hit by Paul Whiteman and His Orchestra with vocalist Jack Fulton. The song's jazz popularity was established by Benny Goodman's 1941 recording with singer Peggy Lee. Coleman Hawkins made a popular jazz version in 1943, and Charlie Parker recorded it as a ballad in 1947.
- "I Don't Stand a Ghost of a Chance with You" was composed by Victor Young with lyrics by Bing Crosby and Ned Washington. The first recording by Crosby became an immediate hit, reaching number five on the pop singles chart. Saxophonist Chu Berry made an influential jazz recording with Cab Calloway in 1940. The song's name is often shortened to "Ghost of a Chance".
- "It Don't Mean a Thing (If It Ain't Got That Swing)" is a jazz song that singer Ivie Anderson introduced with the Duke Ellington Band. The lyrics for the Ellington composition were written by Irving Mills. The same year, a rendition by the Mills Brothers rose to the charts. The song's title introduced the term "swing" into common usage and gave name to the swing era.
- "New Orleans" is a song by Hoagy Carmichael. First recorded by Bennie Moten's Kansas City Orchestra and the Casa Loma Orchestra as an up-tempo number, the song only achieved success after Carmichael recorded a slower version with vocalist Ella Logan. The song was based on the chord progressions of "You Took Advantage of Me" and "Wrap Your Troubles in Dreams".
- "Night and Day" was written by Cole Porter for the musical Gay Divorce. It was introduced on stage by Fred Astaire, who also sang it in the 1934 film The Gay Divorcee, based on the musical. The song remained popular throughout the swing era and charted five times in the 1930s and 1940s. It became Frank Sinatra's first hit under his own name in 1942.
- "Willow Weep for Me" is a song with music and lyrics by Ann Ronell. It was first recorded by Ted Fio Rito and His Orchestra and, two weeks later, by Paul Whiteman and His Orchestra. Art Tatum recorded the piece six times; his 1949 performance on Piano Starts Here is often considered the definitive instrumental version of the song. Count Basie's "Taxi War Dance" was based on the song's harmony. Ronell dedicated the song to George Gershwin.

== 1933 ==
- "Don't Blame Me" was introduced in the musical revue Clowns in Clover and included in the 1933 film Dinner at Eight. The film is often mistakenly given as the song's origin. The first hit recordings were by Guy Lombardo and Ethel Waters in 1933. Nat King Cole recorded it several times as an instrumental, and had a hit with a 1944 vocal version. Charlie Parker made an influential ballad rendition in 1947. The song was composed by Jimmy McHugh with lyrics by Dorothy Fields.
- "I Cover the Waterfront", composed by Johnny Green with lyrics by Edward Heyman, was inspired by the 1932 novel of the same name by Max Miller. The song was included in the score of the 1933 film I Cover the Waterfront, and was first recorded by Abe Lyman and His Orchestra. Louis Armstrong, Joe Haymes, Eddy Duchin and composer Green all made recordings of the song in 1933, and Haymes's and Duchin's versions made the pop charts. Billie Holiday recorded the song many times during her career. Art Tatum recorded it as a solo piano piece in 1949 and returned to it several times.
- "It's Only a Paper Moon" is a song from the short-lived Broadway show The Great Magoo, composed by Harold Arlen with lyrics by Yip Harburg and Billy Rose. Originally titled "If You Believed in Me", the current title was introduced in the 1933 film Take a Chance. The song first charted in 1933 with Paul Whiteman's and Cliff Edwards's recordings. Nat King Cole recorded a trio performance of it in 1943, and both Ella Fitzgerald and Benny Goodman charted with the song in 1945.
- "Moonglow" is a song composed by Will Hudson and Irving Mills, with lyrics written by Eddie DeLange. "Moonglow" was first recorded by Joe Venuti in 1933, with subsequent recordings by Duke Ellington, Cab Calloway, Benny Goodman, Ethel Waters, and Art Tatum in 1934. The tune has since become a jazz standard, performed and recorded numerous times by a wide array of musical talents. The Benny Goodman Quartet with Teddy Wilson, Gene Krupa and Lionel Hampton made a famous version of the song in 1936, Artie Shaw recorded it in 1941, and Harry James recorded it in 1946 (released in 1950) on Columbia 38943.
- "Sophisticated Lady" is a jazz composition by Duke Ellington. Lyrics were later added by Irving Mills and Mitchell Parish. Ellington's recording rose to number three on the charts. Glen Gray and Don Redman also charted with the song in 1933. Lawrence Brown and Toby Hardwick have claimed to have composed parts of the music; according to Stuart Nicholson's Ellington biography, the original composer credits included Ellington, Brown, Hardwick and Mills, but only Ellington was credited when the song was published.
- "Yesterdays" was composed by Jerome Kern for the Broadway musical Roberta, with lyrics by Otto Harbach. It was introduced by Irene Dunne. Not as popular in the pop world as "Smoke Gets in Your Eyes" from the same musical, it has enjoyed much more success in jazz circles. The song is often associated with Billie Holiday, who recorded it in 1944.

== 1934 ==
- "Autumn in New York" was written for the Broadway musical Thumbs Up! by Vernon Duke, who contributed both music and lyrics for the song. Introduced on stage by J. Harold Murray and first recorded by Richard Himber and His Ritz-Carlton Hotel Orchestra, it was not until 1947 that the song became a hit with Jo Stafford's and Frank Sinatra's recordings. It became a popular jazz number in the 1950s after Charlie Parker recorded it for his album Charlie Parker with Strings.
- "Blue Moon", composed by Richard Rodgers, was originally named "Prayer" and meant for the musical film Hollywood Party. Lorenz Hart rewrote the lyrics two times for Manhattan Melodrama, and eventually it was sung by Shirley Ross as "The Bad in Every Man". It was later released commercially as "Blue Moon", with yet another set of lyrics, and was first recorded by Glen Gray and the Casa Loma Orchestra. Hart disliked the final version, which nonetheless became his most popular song. A 1961 rock and roll version by The Marcels sold a million copies and was included in the Rock and Roll Hall of Fame's list of 500 Songs that Shaped Rock and Roll.
- "For All We Know" was written by composer John Coots and lyricist Sam Lewis. Two recordings of the song made the charts, one by Hal Kemp and vocalist Skinnay Ennis which hit number three, and another recording by Isham Jones and vocalist Joe Martin which hit number 16.
- "Solitude" is a Duke Ellington composition with lyrics by Eddie DeLange. Irving Mills received co-credit for the lyrics as Ellington's agent. Ellington claimed to have composed the song in 20 minutes. Two recordings made the charts in 1935, one by Ellington and one by the Mills Blue Rhythm Band. Ellington's first vocal recording was made in 1940 with singer Ivie Anderson. The song is also known as "In My Solitude".
- "Smoke Gets in Your Eyes" is a song from Jerome Kern and Otto Harbach's Broadway musical Roberta. Paul Whiteman and His Orchestra's recording reached number one on the pop charts in 1934. A million-selling, Billboard Hot 100 number one version was recorded by doo-wop group The Platters in 1958. Kern originally composed the song as a fast tap-dance number for his 1927 musical Show Boat, and converted it into a ballad for Roberta. The song is particularly favored by piano players; Teddy Wilson made an early influential piano version in 1941.
- "Stars Fell on Alabama" was written by composer Frank Perkins and lyricist Mitchell Parish. It was introduced by Guy Lombardo and His Royal Canadians, and the first jazz recording was made by Benny Goodman in 1934. Jack Teagarden recorded it many times; his first recording was made with Goodman's orchestra in 1934 and he performed it in a 1947 Boston Symphony Hall concert with Louis Armstrong's All Stars.
- "Stompin' at the Savoy" is a jazz composition by Edgar Sampson with lyrics by Andy Razaf. First recorded by Chick Webb in 1934, it was popularized by Benny Goodman's 1936 recording. Both Webb and Goodman received composer co-credit for the song. It was named after the Savoy Ballroom in New York; the song title is mentioned in a commemorative plaque the ballroom's former place.

== 1935 ==
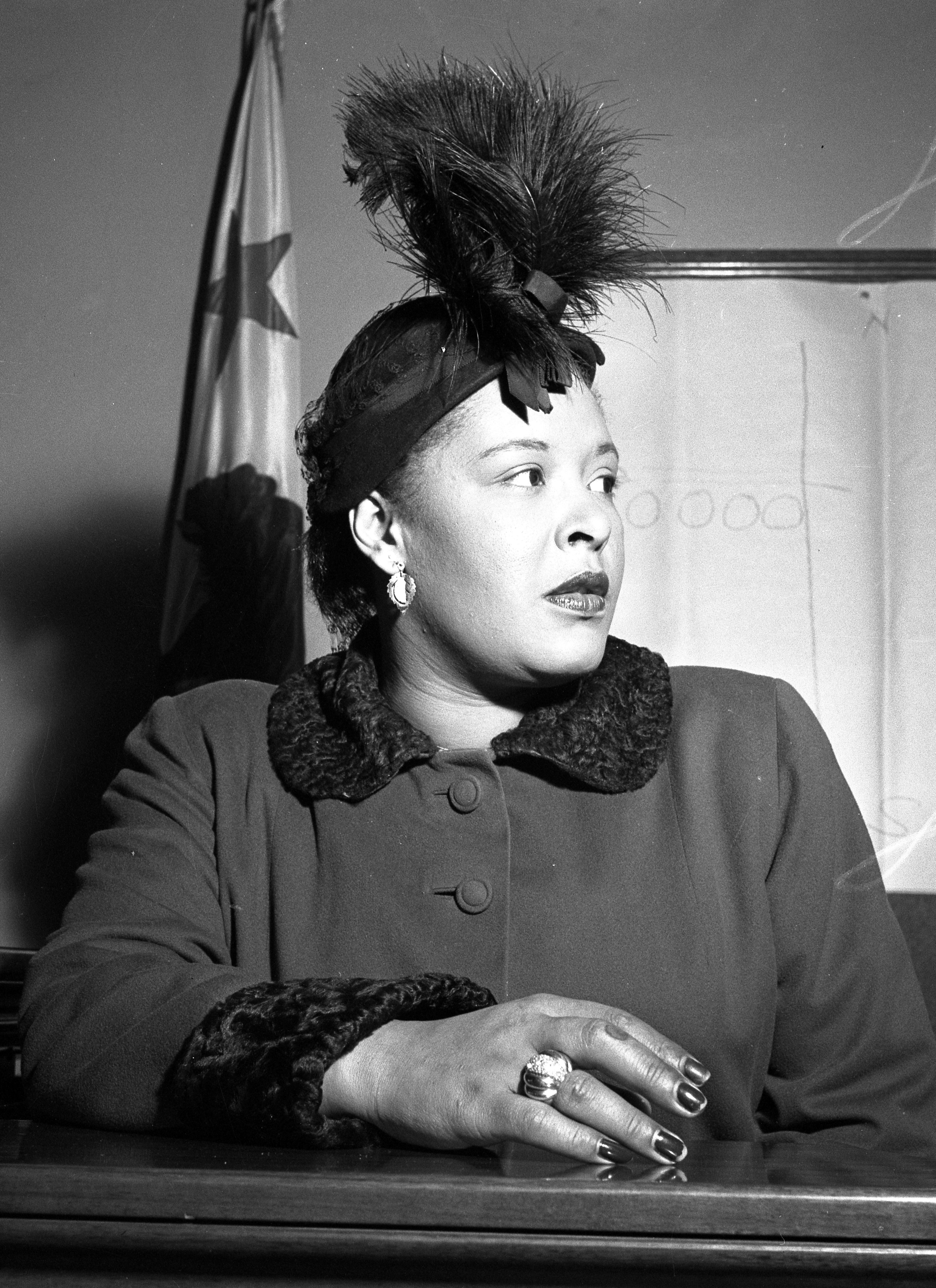
Many 1930s standards were popularized by jazz singer Billie Holiday's recordings, including "These Foolish Things", "Embraceable You" and "Yesterdays".

- "Begin the Beguine" is a show tune from Cole Porter's Broadway musical Jubilee, first recorded by Xavier Cugat and His Waldorf-Astoria Orchestra and popularized by Artie Shaw's recording in 1938. It is considerably longer than the average song of the time (104 bars instead of the usual 32 bar AABA form). Fred Astaire and Eleanor Powell's tap dance to the tune in the 1940 film Broadway Melody of 1940 became one of the most popular dance scenes on film.
- "In a Sentimental Mood" is a jazz song with music by Duke Ellington and lyrics by Manny Kurtz and Irving Mills. Ellington's biographer James Lincoln Collier argues that the melody was originally composed by Toby Hardwick. The song is among Ellington's most popular compositions. Both Benny Goodman and the Mills Blue Rhythm Band charted with the song in 1936. At one point, it was used as the theme song of nine different radio shows.
- "Just One of Those Things" was introduced by June Knight and Charles Walters in Broadway musical Jubilee. The song was written by Cole Porter. Richard Himber and His Orchestra was the first to chart with the song in late 1935. Red Garland recorded it in London in 1936. Teddy Wilson made a 1944 recording with Coleman Hawkins and recorded it the following year with the Benny Goodman Sextet. The song is also known as "It Was Just One of Those Things".
- "My Romance" is a song from Richard Rodgers and Lorenz Hart's Broadway musical Jumbo. Donald Novis and Gloria Grafton introduced the song on stage and recorded it with Paul Whiteman and His Orchestra. Doris Day sang it in Jumbo's 1962 film version. Ben Webster recorded the song several times as a ballad. Bill Evans Trio's 1961 recording on Waltz for Debby is among the many medium-tempo swing renditions of the song.
- "Summertime" was written by George Gershwin for the opera Porgy and Bess, based on a poem by DuBose Heyward. Introduced by Abbie Mitchell, it is one of Gershwin's best-known compositions. Sidney Bechet's 1939 hit record helped establish the Blue Note record label. One of the best-known renditions is by Miles Davis and Gil Evans on Porgy and Bess (1958). Billy Stewart had a top ten hit with the song in 1966.
- "These Foolish Things" is a song from the British musical comedy Spread it Abroad, written by Harry Link, Holt Marvell and Jack Strachey. It was introduced by French actor Jean Sablon, who also recorded it in French as "Ces petites choses". Billie Holiday recorded it in 1936 with Teddy Wilson and His Orchestra. Benny Goodman had a #1 hit with the song in 1936. Lester Young made a 1952 recording with Oscar Peterson's trio, replacing the original melody almost completely. The song is also known as "These Foolish Things Remind Me of You".

== 1936 ==
- "Caravan" is a jazz song with Middle Eastern influences, composed by Duke Ellington and Juan Tizol with lyrics by Irving Mills. It is mostly associated with Ellington, who recorded it many times in different arrangements. It was a permanent part of Ellington's concert repertoire and was always played as the second number. Barney Bigard made the first recording in 1936 with a band composed of members of Ellington's orchestra. The first vocal version to become a hit was made by Billy Eckstine in 1946.
- "I Can't Get Started" was introduced by Bob Hope in the Broadway musical Ziegfeld Follies of 1936. It was composed by Vernon Duke with lyrics by Ira Gershwin. Bunny Berigan's 1937 version became his most popular recording and was inducted into the Grammy Hall of Fame in 1975. Due to the success of Berigan's version, the piece is especially popular among trumpeters. Billie Holiday recorded the song in 1938 with Lester Young, and Young made a recording with his own trio in 1942. The song is also known as "I Can't Get Started with You".
- "Pennies from Heaven" was written by Arthur Johnston and lyricist Johnny Burke for the film Pennies from Heaven. It was introduced by Bing Crosby, whose version remained on the top of the charts for 10 weeks and was nominated for an Academy Award for Best Original Song. Lester Young played on Count Basie's 1937 recording and recorded the song several times in the 1940s and 1950s.
- "Sing, Sing, Sing" is often associated with swing jazz bands, especially Benny Goodman's. The piece was performed in Goodman's 1938 Carnegie Hall concert and was often used as the closing number in his live performances. Written by Louis Prima and originally titled "Sing, Bing, Sing" as a reference to Bing Crosby, the song is also known as "Sing, Sing, Sing (With a Swing)".
- "There Is No Greater Love" is an Isham Jones composition with lyrics by Marty Symes. Released by the Isham Jones Orchestra as a B-side to "Life Begins When You're in Love", it was the band's last hit before Woody Herman took over as bandleader. The first jazz recording was made by Duke Ellington. A part of the song's melody was borrowed from Pyotr Tchaikovsky's Piano Concerto No. 1.
- "The Way You Look Tonight" was introduced by Fred Astaire in the film Swing Time. It was composed by Jerome Kern with lyrics by Dorothy Fields. Astaire's recording reached number one on the charts and the song won the Academy Award for Best Original Song. Billie Holiday recorded it with Teddy Wilson's orchestra in 1936. Benny Goodman made a version with Peggy Lee in 1942 and Art Blakey's Jazz Messengers recorded their version in 1954. Johnny Griffin performed the piece with John Coltrane and Hank Mobley on the 1957 album A Blowin' Session. Kern wrote the song's melody in counterpoint with "A Fine Romance"; the songs are sung together on the film's closing scene.

== 1937 ==
- "Easy Living", a ballad composed by Ralph Rainger with lyrics by Leo Robin, was written for the film Easy Living and included on the soundtrack of the 1940 film Remember the Night. It is most closely associated with Billie Holiday, who recorded it with Teddy Wilson's Orchestra in 1937.
- "A Foggy Day" was written by George and Ira Gershwin for the musical film A Damsel in Distress. It was introduced in the film by Fred Astaire, whose recording rose to number three on the charts. Bob Crosby's orchestra charted with the song in 1938. The song is associated with London and begins with the chimes of Big Ben. It is also called "A Foggy Day in London Town".
- "Have You Met Miss Jones?" is a ballad from the Broadway comedy I'd Rather Be Right, introduced on stage by Joy Hodges and Austin Marshall. The song was composed by Richard Rodgers with lyrics by Lorenz Hart. Its bridge may have served as an inspiration to John Coltrane's 1959 composition "Giant Steps". Female singers often sing it as "Have You Met Sir Jones?".
- "My Funny Valentine" is Richard Rodgers and Lorenz Hart's show tune from the Broadway musical Babes in Arms. It was introduced on stage by Mitzi Green. Hal McIntyre and His Orchestra was the first to chart with the song in 1945. Frank Sinatra recorded a hit version in 1955, and later the song became readily associated with his live performances. Other influential versions were recorded by Chet Baker (on My Funny Valentine, 1954) and Miles Davis (on Cookin', 1956).
- "Nice Work If You Can Get It was written by George and Ira Gershwin for the musical film A Damsel in Distress. It was introduced in the film by Fred Astaire and has been recorded many times by jazz singers and pianists.
- "Once in a While" is a composition by Michael Edwards with lyrics by Bud Green. It became a hit for Tommy Dorsey and His Orchestra, whose recording stayed at the top of the charts for 14 weeks. It was later taken to the charts by Horace Heidt in 1937, Louis Armstrong in 1938, Patti Page in 1952 and doo-wop group The Chimes in 1961. Rahsaan Roland Kirk is credited with reviving interest in the song among jazz musicians with his 1965 recording, which mixed the original with Middle Eastern harmony.
- "One O'Clock Jump" is an instrumental twelve-bar blues composition by Count Basie. Used as the signature piece of Basie's band, it is strongly associated with the swing era and remains one of the best-known compositions of the period. Saxophonist Buster Smith wrote a part of the composition, but was denied co-credit by Basie. "One O'Clock Jump" was taken to the charts by Harry James in 1938 and by the Metronome All-Stars in 1941. Benny Goodman gave an influential performance of it in his 1938 Carnegie Hall concert.
- "Some Day My Prince Will Come" was written by composer Frank Churchill and lyricist Larry Morey for Walt Disney's animated film Snow White and the Seven Dwarfs. The first jazz recordings were by Donald Byrd and The Dave Brubeck Quartet in 1957. Bill Evans has recorded the song several times. Miles Davis's rendition on the album Someday My Prince Will Come (1961) is notable for John Coltrane's memorable solo.
- "They Can't Take That Away from Me" is a song from the musical film Shall We Dance, composed by George Gershwin with lyrics by Ira Gershwin. It was introduced by Fred Astaire, whose recording with the Johnny Green Orchestra stayed at number one for ten weeks. A famous version was recorded by Charlie Parker in 1950 and released on Charlie Parker with Strings.

== 1938 ==
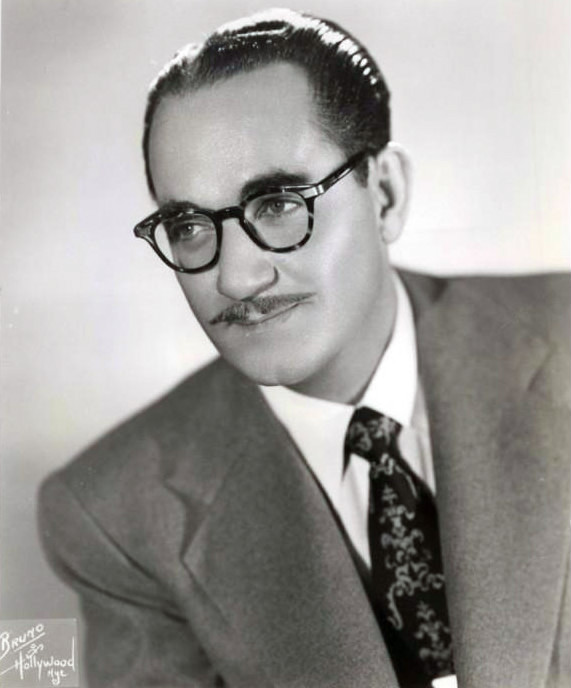
Shep Fields replaced Paul Whiteman with his own network radio show "The Rippling Rhythm Revue" and helped to introduce Thanks for the Memory with Bob Hope in the Paramount Pictures film The Big Broadcast of 1938

- "Cherokee" is a jazz song originally written by Ray Noble as a part of a larger Indian Suite. It became a hit for Charlie Barnet in 1939 as an instrumental. Barnet adopted an extended version of it into his theme song, credited to himself and titled "Redskin Rhumba". Don Byas recorded the piece in 1945, and the same year Charlie Parker used its harmonic progression in his composition "Ko-Ko". Buddy DeFranco's "Swinging the Indian" is also based on the same chord progression. The song is also known as "Indian Love Song".
- "Heart and Soul" is a Hoagy Carmichael composition with lyrics by Frank Loesser. It was first performed by Larry Clinton and His Orchestra featuring Bea Wain in the short film A Song Is Born; their version charted at number one in 1939. The song has been recorded by Ella Fitzgerald, Dean Martin, and Dave Brubeck, among others. It has become a popular piece among amateur pianists.
- "Love Is Here to Stay" was George Gershwin's last composition, written for the musical film The Goldwyn Follies. Lyrics were provided by Ira Gershwin. The song gained little attention from The Goldwyn Follies and is better known for the 1951 film An American in Paris. The song was originally titled "Our Love Is Here to Stay"; Ira Gershwin later said that he would have wanted to change the title back to the original one if the song had not already become popular under its new name.
- "The Nearness of You" was composed by Hoagy Carmichael with lyrics by Ned Washington. It was meant to be included in the film Romance in the Rough, which was never produced. The first hit version was made by Glenn Miller and His Orchestra in 1940. Sarah Vaughan recorded the song in 1949 and several times afterwards. Charlie Parker recorded it live with Woody Herman's Orchestra in 1951.
- "Old Folks" was composed by Willard Robison with lyrics by Dedette Lee Hill, the wife and occasional colleague of Billy Hill. It has been recorded many times by vocalists and instrumentalists and its most famous jazz version is by trumpeter Miles Davis on Someday My Prince Will Come (1961).
- "Prelude to a Kiss" is a jazz ballad composed by Duke Ellington with lyrics by Irving Mills and Mack Gordon. It was first recorded as an instrumental by the Duke Ellington Orchestra featuring Johnny Hodges, who later recorded it with his own orchestra and vocalist Mary McHugh. The composition was based on a melody by Ellington's saxophonist Otto Hardwick.
- "September Song" was introduced by Walter Huston in the Broadway musical Knickerbocker Holiday. It was composed by Kurt Weill with lyrics by Maxwell Anderson. Later hit recordings were made by Frank Sinatra in 1946 and Sarah Vaughan in 1954. Artie Shaw recorded it in 1945 with a big band featuring saxophonist Chuck Gentry. Don Byas made a 1946 recording with his quartet. Guitarist Django Reinhardt recorded the song four times, starting in 1947.
- "Thanks for the Memory" was introduced in the film The Big Broadcast of 1938 which earned the Academy Award for Best Original Song of 1938. It was composed by Ralph Rainger with lyrics by Leo Robin and performed in the film by Bob Hope and Shirley Ross. Hit recordings were made by Shep Fields and his Rippling Rhythm Orchestra and by Bob Hope himself who adopted the composition as his signature song at the close of his USO tours in Europe during World War II. Over the decades the song was frequently recorded and remains a standard in the jazz repertoire to this day.
- "You Go to My Head" was written by composer J. Fred Coots and lyricist Haven Gillespie and introduced by Glen Gray and the Casa Loma Orchestra, who charted at number nine in 1938. Teddy Wilson with vocalist Nan Wynn charted with it in 1938, as did Larry Clinton and His Orchestra with Bea Wain. The song's harmonic sophistication has been praised by critics, who often describe Coots as a "one-hit wonder" despite his "Santa Claus Is Coming to Town" being even more popular in terms of mass appeal.

== 1939 ==
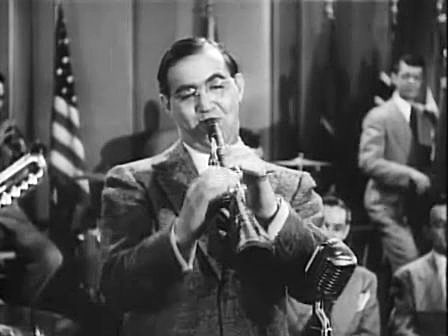
Clarinetist and bandleader Benny Goodman popularized many of the 1930s standards, including "Darn That Dream", "How Deep Is the Ocean", and "Stompin' at the Savoy".

- "All the Things You Are" is a song from Jerome Kern and Oscar Hammerstein II's Broadway musical Very Warm for May. Kern first felt the song, with its constantly shifting tonal centers, was too complex for mass appeal. However, it has enjoyed lasting popularity since then and is now one of the most recorded standards. The song's chord progression has been used for such tunes as "Bird of Paradise" by Charlie Parker and "Prince Albert" by Kenny Dorham.
- "Darn That Dream" was composed by Jimmy Van Heusen for the Broadway musical Swingin' the Dream. Lyrics were written by Eddie DeLange. Although the musical was a disappointment, Benny Goodman's version of the song featuring vocalist Mildred Bailey was a number one hit.
- "Frenesi" is a Latin jazz composition by Alberto Dominguez. Originally composed for the marimba, jazz arrangements were later made by Leonard Whitcup and others. A 1940 hit version recorded by Artie Shaw with an arrangement by William Grant Still was inducted into the Grammy Hall of Fame in 2000.
- "I Didn't Know What Time It Was" was sung by Richard Kollmar and Marcy Westcott in the Richard Rodgers and Lorenz Hart musical Too Many Girls. Benny Goodman recorded the first jazz version in 1939 with vocalist Louise Tobin.
- "I Thought About You" was composed by Jimmy Van Heusen with lyrics by Johnny Mercer. Mildred Bailey recorded the first hit version with the Benny Goodman Orchestra. Guitarist Johnny Smith recorded it in the 1950s for the Roost label. Miles Davis included the song on his 1961 album Someday My Prince Will Come.
- "In the Mood" is a jazz composition by Joe Garland based on Wingy Manone's "Tar Paper Stomp". Andy Razaf wrote the lyrics for the song. Garland recorded "In the Mood" with Edgar Hayes and offered it to Artie Shaw, who never recorded the piece. It was popularized by the Glenn Miller Orchestra in 1939. The final arrangement was the result of work by Garland, Miller, Eddie Durham, and pianist Chummy MacGregor, although only Miller profited from its financial success. The song remains popular and is almost always performed as an instrumental.
- "Moonlight Serenade" was composed by Glenn Miller with lyrics by Mitchell Parish. Miller's orchestra used it as their signature tune, and their recording charted at number three in 1939. The song was recorded by rhythm and blues group The Rivieras in 1959. Carly Simon sang it on her 2005 album Moonlight Serenade.
- "Over the Rainbow" is a ballad introduced by Judy Garland in the film The Wizard of Oz, composed by Harold Arlen with lyrics by Yip Harburg. It was an immediate hit: four different versions, including Garland's, rose to top ten within a month after the film's release. An influential piano solo recording was made by Art Tatum in 1955, and a live solo piano recording was released by singer-songwriter Tori Amos in 1996. The song is also known as "Somewhere over the Rainbow".
- "Something to Live For" is a jazz ballad written by Billy Strayhorn. Based on a poem the composer had written as a teenager, the song was introduced by Duke Ellington's orchestra with composer Strayhorn on the piano. Ellington was co-credited with the composition. The song has been recorded by Ella Fitzgerald, who has called it her favorite song.
- "What's New?" started out as an instrumental titled "I'm Free", composed by Bob Haggart when he was playing in Bob Crosby's Orchestra, and was later retitled when Johnny Burke wrote lyrics for it. The song was introduced by Crosby, and other hit versions from 1939 include Bing Crosby's and Benny Goodman's renditions. Australian singer Catherine O'Hara recorded the song in 1966 with her own lyrics, also titled "I'm Free".
- "Woodchopper's Ball" is a jazz composition by Joe Bishop and Woody Herman. Introduced by the Woody Herman Orchestra, it was the band's first and biggest hit selling over a million records. The original recording was inducted into the Grammy Hall of Fame in 2002. The composition is also known as "At the Woodchopper's Ball".

== Bibliography ==
=== Reference works ===
- Banfield, Stephen; Block, Geoffrey (2006). Jerome Kern. Yale University Press. ISBN 978-0-300-11047-0.
- Bogdanov, Vladimir; Woodstra, Chris; Erlewine, Stephen Thomas (2002). All Music Guide to Jazz: The Definitive Guide to Jazz Music. Backbeat Books. ISBN 978-0-87930-717-2.
- Bradbury, David (2005). Duke Ellington. Haus Publishing. ISBN 978-1-904341-66-6.
- Clayton, Buck; Miller Elliott, Nancy (1995). Buck Clayton's Jazz World. Continuum International Publishing Group. ISBN 978-1-871478-55-6.
- Daniels, Douglas Henry (2006). One O'Clock Jump: The Unforgettable History of the Oklahoma City Blue Devils. Beacon Press. ISBN 978-0-8070-7136-6.
- Dregni, Michael (2004). Django: The Life and Music of a Gypsy Legend. Oxford University Press US. ISBN 978-0-19-516752-8.
- Driggs, Frank; Haddix, Chuck (2006). Kansas City Jazz: From Ragtime to Bebop – A History. Oxford University Press US. ISBN 978-0-19-530712-2.
- Forte, Allen (1995). The American Popular Ballad of the Golden Era, 1924–1950. Princeton University Press. ISBN 978-0-691-04399-9.
- Furia, Philip (1997). Ira Gershwin: The Art of the Lyricist. Oxford University Press US. ISBN 978-0-19-511570-3.
- Giddins, Gary (2000). Visions of Jazz: The First Century. Oxford University Press US. ISBN 978-0-19-513241-0.
- Gioia, Ted (2012). The Jazz Standards: A Guide to the Repertoire. Oxford University Press. ISBN 978-0-19-993739-4.
- Greenberg, Rodney (1998). George Gershwin. Phaidon Press. ISBN 978-0-7148-3504-4.
- Grudens, Richard (2005). The Italian Crooners Bedside Companion. Celebrity Profiles Publishing. ISBN 978-0-9763877-0-1.
- Hersch, Charles (2008). Subversive Sounds: Race and the Birth of Jazz in New Orleans. University of Chicago Press. ISBN 978-0-226-32867-6.
- Hischak, Thomas S. (2007). The Rodgers and Hammerstein Encyclopedia. ABC-CLIO. ISBN 978-0-313-34140-3.
- Hodeir, André; Pautrot, Jean-Louis (2006). The André Hodeir Jazz Reader. University of Michigan Press. ISBN 978-0-472-06883-8.
- Kirchner, Bill (2005). The Oxford Companion to Jazz. Oxford University Press US. ISBN 978-0-19-518359-7.
- Schuller, Gunther (1991). The Swing Era: The Development of Jazz, 1930–1945. Oxford University Press US. ISBN 978-0-19-507140-5.
- Shaw, Arnold (1989). The Jazz Age: Popular Music in the 1920s. Oxford University Press US. ISBN 978-0-19-506082-9.
- Stanton, Scott (2003). The Tombstone Tourist: Musicians. Simon and Schuster. ISBN 978-0-7434-6330-0.
- Studwell, William Emmett; Baldin, Mark (2000). The Big Band Reader: Songs Favored by Swing Era Orchestras and Other Popular Ensembles. Haworth Press. ISBN 978-0-7890-0914-2.
- Studwell, William Emmett (1994). The Popular Song Reader: A Sampler of Well-Known Twentieth-Century Songs. Routledge. pp. 56–57. ISBN 978-1-56024-369-4.
- Sudhalter, Richard M. (2003). Stardust Melody: The Life and Music of Hoagy Carmichael. Oxford University Press US. ISBN 978-0-19-516898-3.
- Tucker, Mark; Ellington, Duke (1995). The Duke Ellington Reader. Oxford University Press US. ISBN 978-0-19-509391-9.
- Van de Leur, Walter (2002). Something to Live For: The Music of Billy Strayhorn. Oxford University Press US. ISBN 978-0-19-512448-4.
- Warner, Jay (2006). American Singing Groups: A History from 1940 to Today. Hal Leonard Corporation. ISBN 978-0-634-09978-6.
- Wilder, Alec; Maher, James T. (1972). American Popular Song: The Great Innovators, 1900–1950. Oxford University Press US. ISBN 978-0-19-501445-7.

=== Fake books ===
A fake book is a collection of musical lead sheets intended to help a performer quickly learn new songs.

- The New Real Book, Volume I. Sher Music. 1988. ISBN 978-0-9614701-4-2.
- The New Real Book, Volume II. Sher Music. 1991. ISBN 978-0-9614701-7-3.
- The New Real Book, Volume III. Sher Music. 1995. ISBN 978-1-883217-30-3.
- The Real Book, Volume I (6th ed.). Hal Leonard. 2004. ISBN 978-0-634-06038-0.
- The Real Book, Volume II (2nd ed.). Hal Leonard. 2007. ISBN 978-1-4234-2452-9.
- The Real Book, Volume III (2nd ed.). Hal Leonard. 2006. ISBN 978-0-634-06136-3.
- The Real Jazz Book. Warner Bros. ISBN 978-91-85041-36-7.
- The Real Vocal Book, Volume I. Hal Leonard. 2006. ISBN 978-0-634-06080-9.
