= Woodchopper's Ball =

1939 jazz composition

Single by Woody Herman And His Orchestra
- B-side: "Indian Boogie Woogie"
- Released: 1939
- Genre: jazz
- Length: 3:17
- Label: Decca
- Songwriters: Joe Bishop, Woody Herman

"Woodchopper's Ball", also known as "At the Woodchopper's Ball" is a 1939 jazz composition by Joe Bishop and Woody Herman. The up-tempo blues tune in D-flat major was the Woody Herman Orchestra's biggest hit, as well as the most popular composition of either composer, selling a million records.

The tune has been performed by numerous artists and is considered a jazz standard. It is included in the first volume of Hal Leonard's Real Book. The song was covered by the British blues/rock band Ten Years After on their album, Undead. The original recording by Woody Herman and His Orchestra received the Grammy Hall of Fame Award in 2002.

== Twistin' at the Woodchopper's Ball ==
"Twistin' at the Woodchopper's Ball"

Single by The Ronn Metcalfe Orchestra

from the album Twistin' at the Woodchopper's Ball
- B-side: "The Big Band Twist"
- Released: February 19, 1962
- Genre: rock and roll
- Length: 2:30
- Label: Quality Records
- Songwriters: Joe Bishop, Woody Herman, Ronn Metcalfe

"Twisting at the Woodchopper's Ball" was a hit recording written by Ronn Metcalfe, based on "Woodchopper's Ball". It was recorded by the 19 piece Ronn Metcalfe Orchestra (of St. Catharines, Canada) on the Barry label and distributed by Quality Records Ltd., of Toronto (released on February 19, 1962). It rose to the top of the charts in Canada (Hit Parade Charts), and made the WLS (Chicago) Top 40 in 1962. The song was the first Canadian single to top the International Charts.

Metcalf released an LP named after the title track, "Twistin' at the Woodchopper's Ball", which garnered him a gold record. The album was a good example of high calibre musicianship combined with well written arrangements. Metcalfe would ride the success of this album to create a rock and roll scene in Niagara, Canada. Metcalfe, "Canada's King of Swing", paid $7000 to produce the LP, including the single release from the album, which was chosen "Pick of the Week" in Cash Box magazine. Metcalfe said of the song, "This is the way back to the big bands."

== See also ==
- List of 1930s jazz standards
