= Beautiful Love (1931 song) =

Song
- Released: 1931
- Genre: Popular music
- Composers: Wayne King, Victor Young, Egbert Van Alstyne
- Lyricist: Haven Gillespie

"Beautiful Love" is a popular song composed by Wayne King, Victor Young and Egbert Van Alstyne with lyrics by Haven Gillespie. It was introduced by the Wayne King Orchestra in 1931. The song has been called the "second favourite number" of King, after the Orchestra's theme song "The Waltz You Saved for Me".

As a popular jazz standard, the song is included in the first volume of the Real Book as well as the New Real Book.

It appears as a love theme both in the 1932 film The Mummy (when it is played during the ball sequence where Helen is telepathically called to the museum), and in the film Hotel Continental, also 1932. The song is included in the film Sing a Jingle (1944) and it was also included in the 1989 film Crimes and Misdemeanors by Woody Allen.

Joe Pass performed the song at the Brecon Jazz Festival in 1991 and stated in good jest that he couldn't remember if it was by Victor Herbert, Victor Young or Victor Mature.

== Other recordings ==
- Bing Crosby recorded the song on July 24, 1944 with Victor Young and His Orchestra for Decca Records.
- Anita O'Day - for her album Anita (1956).
- Edna Savage (1959).
- Bill Evans - Explorations (1961)
- New York alternative metal band Helmet included a cover version of the song on their 1994 album Betty.
- Michel Petrucciani with Jim Hall and Wayne Shorter for their live album Power of three (Blue Note, 1987).
- Jacky Terrasson and Tom Harrell - Moon and Sand (1991)
- The song has been recorded by Sophie Milman on her album Take Love Easy in 2009.

== See also ==
- List of 1930s jazz standards
