= Michael Edwards (American composer) =

American composer and musician

- Born: 1893
- Died: 1962 (aged 68–69)
- Occupations: composer and musician
- Known for: one-hit composer
- Notable work: "Once in a While"

Michael Edwards (1893–1962) was an American composer and musician, known for composing the 1937 hit "Once in a While". He was also a classical violinist, organist and music arranger.

Edwards's most famous composition, "Once in a While", became a number one hit for Tommy Dorsey and His Orchestra, and later for Patti Page (1957) and The Chimes (1961). The song is now considered a jazz standard. None of Edwards's other songs achieved the popularity of "Once in a While", and he has been called "a perfect example of a one-hit composer".
