= Walk a Little Faster =

- Sheet music cover (cropped)
- Music: Vernon Duke
- Lyrics: E. Y. Harburg
- Book: S. J. Perelman and Robert MacGunigle
- Productions: 1932 Broadway

Walk a Little Faster is a musical revue with sketches by S. J. Perelman and Robert MacGunigle, music by Vernon Duke, and lyrics by E. Y. Harburg.

== Production ==
The Broadway production opened on December 7, 1932, at the St. James Theatre and then moved to the Selwyn Theatre, closing on March 18, 1933, for a total of 119 performances. Staged by Monty Woolley, the cast starred Beatrice Lillie, the comedy team of Bobby Clark and Paul McCullough, and Evelyn Hoey. The production design, by Boris Aronson, featured an innovative use of stage curtains; for example, one was shaped like an iris lens.

=== April in Paris ===
The show was only a moderate success but contained the famous song April in Paris. It was introduced by Evelyn Hoey. According to an account by Stanley Green, the idea for this song title came about as Duke and friends were talking about Paris in a restaurant. When someone said 'Oh, to be in Paris now that April's here', Duke started composing on the spot. According to Harburg, the song came from Aronson's model of a set of Paris. "Aronson was in love with Paris...he designed one of the most beautiful, sensitive sets that ever was seen." The producer wanted a song to match the set.

== Sketches ==
Bea Lillie was a 1906 college girl, Penelope Goldfarb ("Scamp of the Campus"); the belle of the Yukon, "Frisco Fanny"; a radio songstress,
and a French chanteuse ("Quel Bijou"). Clark and McCullough provided additional humor with their usual outfits and props, including a cigar
for Clark. One of the sketches was a take-off on another show, Flying Colors, in which Clark pretended to be Clifton Webb
and Lillie was Tamara Geva.

== Songs ==
- Where Have We Met Before?
- Speaking of Love
- A Penny for Your Thoughts
- April in Paris
- That's Life
- So Nonchalant
- Off again, On Again
