= April in Paris (song) =

Jazz standard from 1932 by Yip Harburg and Vernon Duke

Song
- Written: 1932 by Harms
- Composer: Vernon Duke
- Lyricist: E. Y. Harburg

"April in Paris" refrain, mm. 8–11.

"April in Paris"

Song by Count Basie Orchestra

from the album April in Paris
- Released: 1957
- Genre: Jazz
- Length: 2:58
- Label: Verve
- Songwriter: Vernon Duke (composer)
- Producer: Norman Granz

"April in Paris" is a popular song with music by Vernon Duke and lyrics by Yip Harburg in 1932 for the Broadway musical Walk a Little Faster. The original 1933 hit was performed by Freddy Martin, and the 1952 remake (inspired by the movie of the same name) was by the Sauter-Finegan Orchestra, whose version made the Cashbox Top 50. Songwriter Alec Wilder writes: "There are no two ways about it: this is a perfect theater song. If that sounds too reverent, then I'll reduce the praise to 'perfectly wonderful', or else say that if it's not perfect, show me why it isn't."

== Recordings ==
=== Count Basie version ===
Count Basie's 1955 recording on the album of the same name is the most famous, and that particular performance was inducted into the Grammy Hall of Fame. The arrangement was by Wild Bill Davis. On this recording, trumpeter Thad Jones played his famous "Pop Goes the Weasel" solo, trombonist Benny Powell performed his much noted bridge, and Basie directs the band to play the shout chorus "one more time" and then "one more once".

A revised arrangement of the song, played by the Count Basie Orchestra in a cameo appearance, is also featured in the 1974 film Blazing Saddles.

Freddy Martin and Henry King had the earliest hits of this song, at the very end of 1933.

It has been performed by many artists, including: Alex Chilton, Benny Goodman, Bill Evans, Billie Holiday, Billy Eckstine, Blossom Dearie, Bud Powell, Charlie Parker, Count Basie, Doris Day, Ella Fitzgerald, Frank Sinatra, Glenn Miller, Louis Armstrong, Mary Kaye Trio, Sammy Davis Jr., Sarah Vaughan, Thelonious Monk, Tommy Dorsey, Tony Bennett, and Wynton Marsalis.

== See also ==
- List of 1930s jazz standards
- April in Paris (film)

== Literature ==
- Ted Gioia The Jazz Standards: A Guide to the Repertoire Oxford University Press; Oxford 2012; ISBN 978-0199937394
