= Once in a While (1937 song) =

Popular song performed by Tommy Dorsey

"Once In Awhile"
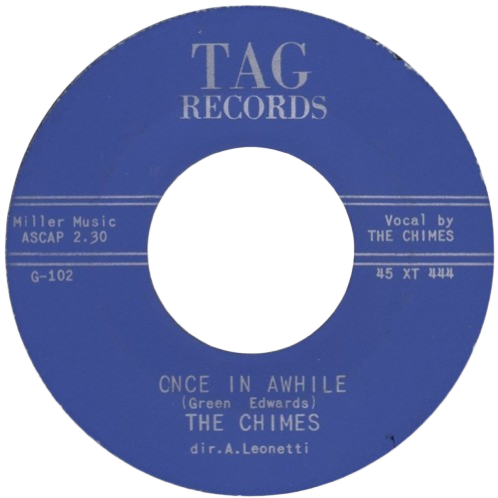

Single by The Chimes
- B-side: "Summer Night"
- Released: October 1960
- Recorded: 1960
- Genre: Doo-wop
- Length: 2:30
- Label: Tag Records
- Songwriter: Michael Edwards

The Chimes singles chronology
"Once In Awhile" (1960)	"Only Love" (1961)

"Once in a While" is a popular song, written by Michael Edwards with lyrics by Bud Green. The song was published in 1937. The song is a much-recorded standard.

== Popular recordings ==
- Tommy Dorsey's recording in 1937 went to number one in the United States.
- One of the best-known recordings was made by Patti Page in 1952 (on Mercury 5867). It reached the US pop top-ten.
- The song was revived in doo-wop style by the Chimes in 1960, and their version peaked at number eleven on the Billboard Hot 100 in January 1961.

== Other recordings ==
Year	Performer	Album	Source
1937	Louis Armstrong		
1947	Sarah Vaughan		
1951	The Dinning Sisters		
1954	The Art Blakey Quintet	A Night at Birdland, Volume 1	
1954	Sonny Clark	Jimmy Raney Visits Paris, Volume 1	
1954	Jackie Gleason Orchestra	Music, Martinis and Memories	
1957	The Pied Pipers	A Tribute to Tommy Dorsey	
1958	Lem Winchester and Ramsey Lewis	A Tribute to Clifford Brown	
1961	Fats Domino	I Miss You So	
1968	Ella Fitzgerald	30 by Ella	
1974	Dean Martin	Once in a While	
1976	Bing Crosby	Feels Good, Feels Right	
1976	Jack Jones	The Full Life	
1977	Liza Minnelli	New York, New York	
1984	Elkie Brooks	Screen Gems	
1986	Cleo Laine	That Old Feeling	
2010	Mose Allison	The Way of the World	
2011	Eddie Vedder	Ukulele Songs	
2019	Seth MacFarlane	Once in a While	

== Popular culture ==
- At the end of the instrumental "Stucco Homes" on the third volume of Frank Zappa's 1981 album Shut Up 'n Play Yer Guitar, drummer Terry Bozzio sings the hook of this song.

== See also ==
- List of 1930s jazz standards
