= Ronn Metcalfe =

Canadian musician

- Born: July 20, 1930; Canada
- Origin: St. Catharines, Ontario, Canada
- Died: May 18, 1969 (aged 38); Ottawa, Ontario, Canada
- Genres: Big band; rock and roll
- Occupation: Band leader

Ronn Metcalfe (July 20, 1930 – May 18, 1969) was a Canadian big band leader from St. Catharines and a music industry leader.

He released an LP named after the title track "Twistin' at the Woodchopper's Ball" which garnered him a gold record. He used this success to start a rock and roll band scene in Niagara, Canada. He created the Image Artist Representatives booking/managing agency, and opened The Castle in St. Catharines, the premiere club for bands between Buffalo and Toronto.

Another hit from Metcalfe (which he wrote) was a song called "Back to T.O." (T.O. is vernacular for Toronto)

This Niagara scene spawned many musicians such as Neil Peart from Rush, Glen Gratto from Lee Aaron, Bullrush, and The Mad Cats, Gary Storin from The Stampeders, The Hunt's Paul Dickinson, and Brian Gagnon and other music industry "behind the scene" types such as Jimmy Johnson from Rush and Styx.

Some of Metcalfe's band include:

- Drummer Chico Fernandez who went on to work with Motown and Vegas acts
- Alto sax Fred Lipsius who went on to create Blood, Sweat & Tears
- Bass trombonist Tony Salvatore who later joined Doc Severinsen's Tonight Show Band
- Sam Falzone who later joined up with Don Ellis.

Metcalfe died of a sudden heart attack at the age of 38 while on a business/family trip to Ottawa. At the time he was securing a deal with Polydor Records, for songwriter Pete Dowan and others.
