= Variations on "I Got Rhythm" =

Work for piano and orchestra by George Gershwin

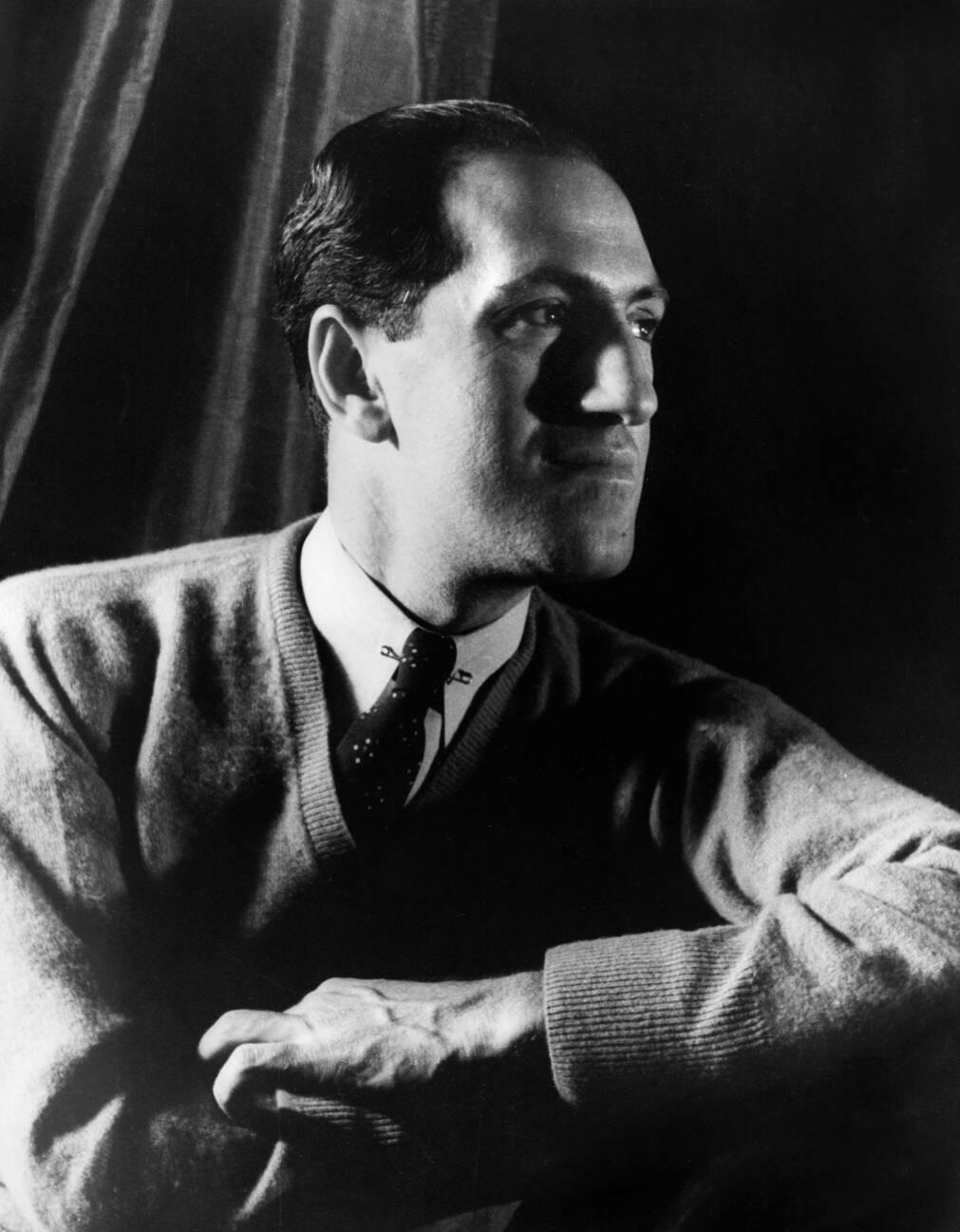
George Gershwin in 1937

Variations on "I Got Rhythm" is a set of variations for orchestra and piano solo composed by George Gershwin in 1933–34. The piece is dedicated "to [his] brother Ira".

Gershwin composed the new piece for his forthcoming concert tour with the Leo Reisman Orchestra, as an alternative to his Rhapsody in Blue and Concerto in F. He took the melody of his hit song "I Got Rhythm" from the musical Girl Crazy as the base of the piece. Most of the piece was composed during a three-week vacation in Palm Beach, and it was completed on January 6, 1934, after he returned to New York. It received its première in Boston at the Symphony on January 14, 1934, by the orchestra, conducted by Charles Previn.

The piece starts off with the repetitions of four rising innocent clarinets notes on pentatonic scale, which opens the melody of the original song. The orchestra joins in after a brief piano answer to the clarinet. The piano and the orchestra state the main themes of the song which then is followed by a series of variations in the styles of waltz, atonal/serialist, oriental, jazz, a variation where the treble and bass sections are inverted, and then a grand restatement and finale.

== Preservation status ==
On September 22, 2013, it was announced that a musicological critical edition of the full orchestral score would eventually be released. The Gershwin family, working in conjunction with the Library of Congress and the University of Michigan, are working to make scores available to the public that represent Gershwin's true intent. The critical score should restore the original orchestrations, but it is unknown if it will also include the subsequent reorchestration by William Schoenfeld to provide context to historical recordings of the work.

The entire Gershwin project may take 30 to 40 years to complete, and it is unknown when the score to the I Got Rhythm Variations will be released.

Meanwhile, the German publisher B-Note has released a new edition of Gershwin's original orchestration based on the manuscript full score, though due to copyright law, this edition is not yet public domain in the United States nor can it be distributed there.

== Bibliography ==
- Greenberg, Rodney (1998). George Gershwin, pp. 152–155. Phaidon Press. ISBN 0-7148-3504-8.
