= Joe Bishop =

American jazz musician

- Born: November 27, 1907 Monticello, Arkansas, U.S.
- Died: May 12, 1976 (aged 68) Houston, Texas, U.S.
- Genres: Jazz
- Instruments: Tuba; piano

Joe Bishop (November 27, 1907 – May 12, 1976) was an American jazz multi-instrumentalist and composer.

== Early life and education ==
Bishop was born in Monticello, Arkansas. He learned piano, trumpet, and tuba when he was young, and also played flugelhorn and mellophone. He attended Hendrix College and played professionally with the Louisiana Ramblers in 1927, including in Mexico.

== Career ==
Bishop played with Mart Britt, Al Katz, and Austin Wylie before joining Isham Jones's band for five years. He was a founding member of Woody Herman's band in the 1930s, but he contracted tuberculosis in 1940 and had to leave the group. He was rehired by Herman as a staff arranger later in the 1940s, and his arrangements and compositions were recorded frequently by Herman, appearing on some 50 of Herman's albums. As a performer, Bishop played with Cow Cow Davenport and Jimmy Gordon's Vip Vop Band, but retired from studio work due to his health in the 1950s. He quit music and opened a store in Saranac Lake, New York, and later retired to Texas. he died in Houston Texas on May 12 1976.

Bishop's compositions include "Midnight Blue", "Woodchopper's Ball", and "Blue Prelude" (with Gordon Jenkins), and his work has been covered by musicians as diverse as Ten Years After and Lawrence Welk.
