= Evelyn Hoey =

American actress

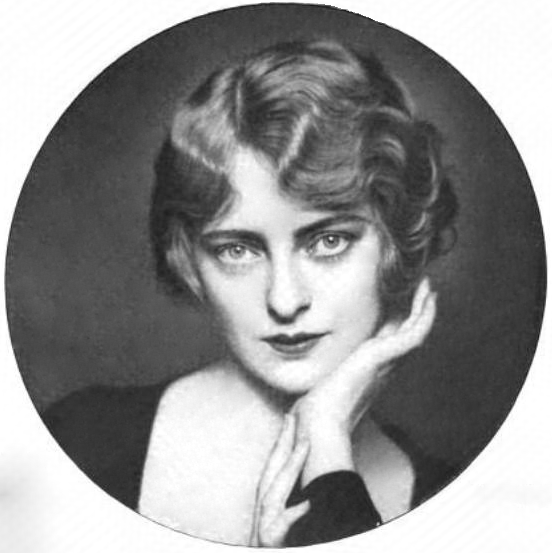
- Born: December 15, 1910; Minneapolis, Minnesota, US
- Died: September 11, 1935 (aged 24); Wallace Township, Pennsylvania, US
- Cause of death: Gunshot
- Occupations: Singer, actress

Evelyn Hoey (December 15, 1910 – September 11, 1935) was a Broadway theatre torch singer and actress.

== Life and career ==
Evelyn Hoey was born in Minneapolis on December 15, 1910. She was noted for her performances in Fifty Million Frenchmen and Good News. She began performing at the age of 10 in Minneapolis. As an adult she appeared in London, England and Paris, France. She had one movie credit with a role in the 1930 comedy Leave It To Lester. The film was directed by Frank Cambria and co-starred Lester Allen and Hal Thompson.

== Hoey's death ==
Hoey was found shot to death in an upstairs bedroom of oil heir Henry H. Rogers III's Indian Run Farm house, Wallace Township near Downingtown, Pennsylvania, in 1935. A bullet was discharged in her brain on the night of September 11. She had been a guest at the home for a week. Others present were Rogers, photographer William J. Kelley, a Japanese cook, George Yamada, a butler, and Rogers' chauffeur, Frank Catalano. Later the body was taken to the county hospital in West Chester, Pennsylvania, for an autopsy.

=== Coroner's inquest ===
At the inquest, Rogers and Kelley said they were seated in the living room on the first floor when they heard the shot that caused Hoey's death. Their testimony was supported by Yamada, Catalano, and a farmer who was present when he called to collect some wages he was owed. The coroner's jury returned an open verdict that Hoey killed herself in the second floor bedroom.

=== Grand jury ===
In October 1935 District Attorney William E. Parke requested that a grand jury investigate Hoey's death. He also asked for an investigation into the conduct of members of the coroner's jury and the people with whom they had been in contact. He wanted to identify any association with certain newspaper men who covered the inquest.

A jury convened in West Chester on November 12, 1935. Among the witnesses was Hoey's singing coach Victor Andoga. Andoga testified that he believed Hoey committed suicide because of anguish over a love affair with a New York theatrical man. He said she was also worried that her voice was failing. She twice told him she wanted to end her life. Hoey confided to Andoga in 1932 that a man wanted to marry her but she was unwilling because of her affection for the theater man. She asked him to test her voice when she returned from a trip to Bermuda in 1934. Hoey told Andoga that she took the trip with the idea of jumping overboard, but lost her nerve.

The grand jury concluded on November 18 that Hoey committed suicide by shooting herself in the head. They found that members of the coroner's jury were too intimately associated with news reporters. The grand jury found no criminal interference with any juryman or the deputy coroner.
