= The Chimes (American band) =

Doo wop group from Brooklyn

The Chimes (later Lenny Cocco & the Chimes) were an American doo wop group from Brooklyn. The group came together under the direction of lead singer Lenny Cocco in the mid-1950s. Their first single was a version of "Once in a While"—a 1937 hit for Tommy Dorsey—released on Tag Records. The song became a hit in the U.S., peaking at No. 11 on the Billboard Hot 100 in January 1961, and No. 15 in Canada. The follow-up single was "I'm in the Mood for Love", a song from the 1930s. This hit No. 38 later that year. In 1962, they began recording as Lenny & the Chimes, and moved to Metro Records and then to Laurie Records in 1963. In 1964, they released the single "Two Times" on Vee-Jay, but broke up shortly after.

In subsequent decades they have re-formed for the doo-wop revival circuit, usually under the name Lenny Cocco and the Chimes. Cocco died in 2015 at age 78.

== Members ==
=== Original ===
- Lenny Cocco – lead singer and founder (born Leonard Cocco in Brooklyn in 1936; died on May 8, 2015, in Holbrook)
- Pat DePrisco – first tenor; died September 21, 2022
- Richard Mercado – second tenor; died October 12, 2015
- Joseph Croce – baritone; died 1993 approx
- Pat McGuire – bass; died 1963, car accident
