= The Real Book =

Compilation of lead sheets

- Author: Various
- Subject: Jazz
- Genre: Sheet music
- Publisher: Bootleg (1st–5th eds.); Hal Leonard (6th ed.)
- Publication date: c.1974 (1st ed.); 2004 (6th ed.)
- Pages: 512 (1st ed.); 462 (6th ed.)
- Followed by: The Real Book, Volume II

The Real Book is a compilation of lead sheets for jazz standards. It was created in the mid-1970s by two students at the Berklee College of Music. In its original form, it was an illegal publication made at local copy shops. It quickly became a standard reference for musicians. Two additional volumes were bootlegged in subsequent decades.

In 2004, Hal Leonard published a new, legal edition of The Real Book with all songs licensed from their respective copyright holders and with royalties paid to the composers.

== Background ==
Jazz is largely an aural form where musicians learn music and improvise by ear. Much of the music was not expressly written down. When a song was notated, it often employed the sort of shorthand notation familiar to continuo players in the Baroque era: a melody would be accompanied by numbers and symbols to indicate the harmony. Jazz notation would typically include a song's melody and an outline of its chords. This shorthand notation became known as a "lead sheet". By the 1940s, lead sheets were being collected into books and marketed to musicians in trade journals. Because a musician could credibly bluff their way through a song they did not know by playing off a lead sheet, these collections were called "fake books".

One precursor to The Real Book was George Goodwin's Tune-Dex service, which was designed to help radio programmers keep up with the newest songs. Each Tune-Dex card included publishing information on one side and a lead sheet on the other. Goodwin began marketing Tune-Dex to musicians as well, even though he was breaking his licensing agreements with music publishers by doing so. Eventually, Tune-Dex cards were bundled into fake books and sold widely.

In order to legally print music, the copyright holder must give permission. In the 1960s, the United States Code Section 104 of Title 17 allowed for a punishment of a year in prison or a fine of $100–1,000 for each instance of copyright infringement for profit. Fake books with hundreds of songs created massive criminal liabilities for their publishers. The FBI took notice and prosecuted some of the more egregious distributors of such books. The first prosecution under the law took place in 1962. This coincided with the rapid decline of sheet music sales. Recordings had long displaced sheet music as the most lucrative profit center in the music industry. By the late 1950s, sales were so low that hit songs were not guaranteed a sheet music publication because it might not be profitable.

A music publishing sea change was underway in the 1960s as musicians gained a general understanding of how it worked. Composers frequently lose out on income by signing away or being tricked out of maximizing their publishing rights. Duke Ellington was exploited by people like Irving Mills, who would make dubious writing claims to siphon off part of the publishing income from a song like "Mood Indigo". Ellington established the publishing company Tempo Music in 1941 to control his intellectual property. In the 1960s, more musicians began to create publishing companies as they possessed a more sophisticated understanding of the business. Jazz musicians also realized the benefit of writing their own tunes, however inane, in order to earn publishing fees from their performances and recordings. Jazz standards written by other composers began to lose market share to original compositions.

== Composition ==
The Real Book was created by two Berklee College of Music students. Because of the illegality of their project, the compilers of The Real Book have remained anonymous, even though their identities are an open secret. One was Pat Metheny's student and the other was in Gary Burton's studio.

Burton's office had a filing cabinet full of precious lead sheets that would often be raided by curious students. The charts were for Burton's band, and they included tunes by Metheny, Steve Swallow, Chick Corea, Mike Gibbs, and Keith Jarrett. The two students created a music folio that combined their teachers' songs along with jazz standards. Metheny recalls the students as "funny guys" who loved the joke of dubbing their fake book The Real Book.

Their primary motivation was to pay for their Berklee tuition. Their teachers briefly wrestled with the legal issue of allowing their songs to appear in the book. However, as the project picked up steam, the students noticed that there was a need for more accurate charts than the ones found in most fake books. Berklee faculty discreetly pitched in to help with the project. Both Steve Swallow and Herb Pomeroy edited charts for the book.

The charts were mainly written by Pat Metheny's student. He had a very legible hand and became a successful copyist in the film industry. His manuscript style was widely imitated and became a standard font option in scorewriter softwares. The legibility of The Real Book played a large role in its popularity.

Compiling the charts took many months. When they were ready, the authors took their book to a local copy shop and ordered a run of several hundred copies. They sold the books out of their dorm room and in the cafeteria. They also made consignment arrangements with smoke shops and bookstores, which would often sell the books under the counter.

== Content ==
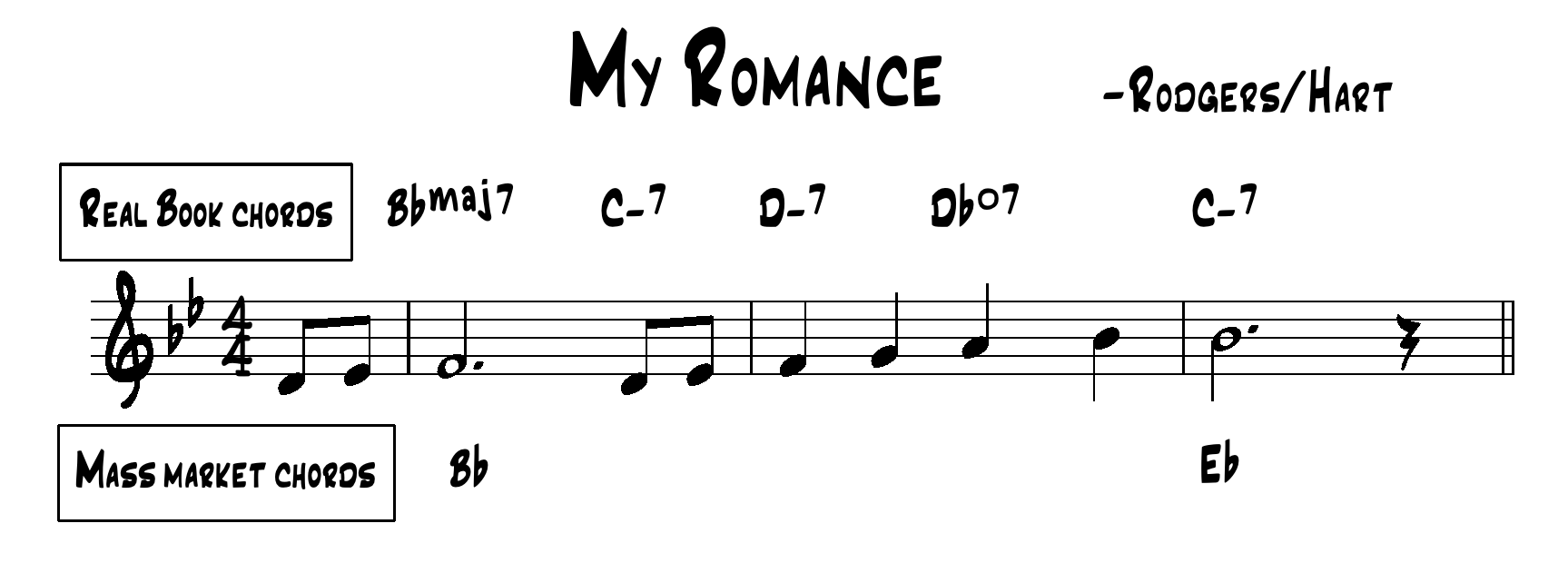
Incipit to "My Romance" with Real Book and mass market chords.

The goal to create more accurate charts for The Real Book was centered on including chord progressions that reflected the state of the art. A typical sheet music publication of a show tune would be arranged in order to be playable at home by an amateur musician. The Real Book lead sheet for a tune like "My Romance" did not reflect the standard mass market harmonization of Richard Rodgers and Lorenz Hart's song. Instead, it used the kind of sophisticated chord substitutions found in a Bill Evans' performance. In the opening bars of "My Romance" edited for a general audience, there are two chords. In The Real Book, there are two chords per measure.

Creating contemporary charts required painstaking transcription of recordings. Unfortunately, editorial errors were legion in the book. Even though it was an improvement on its competition, there were often inaccurate chord progressions or melodic errors. As much as The Real Book became a standard reference, it also was a whipping boy, constantly ridiculed for such mistakes.

The compilers of The Real Book included songs that reflected the ecumenical nature of jazz in the 1970s. Show tunes like "Blue Room" sat beside avant-garde platforms like Ornette Coleman's "Broadway Blues". Frank Zappa's "Peaches en Regalia" is perched a few pages after Antonio Carlos Jobim's "One Note Samba". The Beatles' "Yesterday" is included along with Stevie Wonder's "You Are the Sunshine of My Life", which was released in 1973 while the students were still in the process of compiling the book.

Several of Pat Metheny's charts were brand new and untitled. They appear in The Real Book as Exercises #3 & 6. Metheny recorded them for his solo debut in December 1975 and gave them the respective titles "Missouri Uncompromised" and "Unity Village". The album was released as Bright Size Life in March 1976. The placeholder titles help establish when the book took its final shape.

== Impact ==
Within weeks of its publication, the book had been copied hundreds of times. In the following years, it ballooned to the thousands. The Real Book quickly became the most respected and utilized resource in the industry.

Because it was a bootleg product, its creators had no way to protect it. Copy shops quickly realized they could bootleg the bootleggers, which helped fuel the rapid dissemination of The Real Book. It also gave rise to the five subsequent editions of The Real Book. Because the books authors were being cut out of the profits by copy shops selling their own copies of the illegal book, they created new editions of the book. Each new edition incorporated the mountains of feedback and corrections the authors received from their teachers and peers. A new edition would be printed in a much larger initial run, to maximize their profits before their ripoff was ripped off. The fifth edition of The Real Book was the last by its original authors. They finished school and put the project behind them.

A variety of dates have been attributed to the book. The April 1990 issue of Esquire featured The Real Book in the "Man at His Best" column by Mark Roman in an article called "Clef Notes". He stated, "I don't know a jazzman who hasn't owned, borrowed, or Xeroxed pages from a The Real Book at least once in his career," and he quoted John F. Voigt, music librarian at Berklee. "The Real Book came out around 1971. The only material available in print then was crap."

Another feature surfaced on April 10, 1994, in The New York Times article "Flying Below the Radar of Copyrights". Guitarist Bill Wurtzel was quoted as saying, "Everyone has one, but no one knows where they come from." The writer of the article, Michael Lydon, said, "I got mine in 1987 from a bassist who lives in Queens and who attended the Berklee School of Music in Boston; many in jazz circles suspect that students there reproduced the first copies of it in the mid-70s."

The Real Book, Volume II appeared in the mid 1980s, followed by Volume III in the 1990s. Neither volume was created by the original authors. Though they emulate the style of the original, both were considered inferior and had little influence in professional circles.

=== Hal Leonard ===
In 2004, the music publisher Hal Leonard obtained the rights to most of the tunes contained in the original The Real Book and published the first legal edition, calling it The Real Book Sixth Edition in tacit acknowledgment of the five previous illegal versions. The cover and binding are identical to the "old" The Real Book, and the books employ a font similar to the handwritten style of the originals. One hundred and thirty-seven tunes were omitted from the sixth edition that were in the fifth, and 90 new tunes were added.

Hal Leonard released The Real Book, Volume II Second Edition in answer to the illicit The Real Book, Volume II. This was followed by The Real Book, Volume III Second Edition (July 2006), The Real Book, Volume IV (December 2010), The Real Book, Volume V (June 2013), and The Real Book, Volume VI (June 2016). These books contain much of the same material as their counterparts, and in most cases charts from Hal Leonard books are compatible with the original Real Book charts. In some cases, compatibility issues occur where corrections have been made to some of the mistakes in the fifth edition charts; in other cases, sixth edition charts reference changes on different recordings from those cited in the previous edition. For example, the old Real Book notates the Thelonious Monk tune "Straight, No Chaser" in the key of F, as that is the key used by trumpeter Miles Davis both on his album Milestones and in live performances throughout his career, while the sixth edition notates the tune in B♭, as that is the key used by Monk himself in several of his own recordings.

In addition to the main series, Hal Leonard has published artist-specific editions of The Real Book focusing on tunes written by specific jazz artists; artists spotlighted in this fashion include Miles Davis, Duke Ellington, Charlie Parker (The Bird Book), John Coltrane (The Trane Book), Bud Powell, and Pat Metheny. Hal Leonard has also published fake books inspired by the aesthetic of The Real Book for a variety of genres, including blues, country, Latin, and rock.

In 2025, Berklee Press partnered with Hal Leonard on a branded The Berklee Real Book. The 300-song book imitates the bootleg original that began as a student scheme half a century earlier.

== Selected editions ==
1. The Real Book 2nd edition, Hal Leonard (publisher) (2004) ("The Real Book", 2nd edition from 2004 encompasses volumes II and III only, where as "The Real Book" 2nd edition (1980) is the second edition of Volume I and was published many years before Hal Leonard got involved)
  Volume II OCLC 605194191, 60841601
  Volume II, C OCLC 213853072
  Volume III OCLC 795309725, 787732883, 317729978
  Volume III, E♭ OCLC 605194255
2. The Real Book, 2nd edition, (1980) OCLC 314155091
3. The Real Book, Pacific edition, Real Book Press (1980) OCLC 9593108
4. The Real Book, 6th edition (2007) OCLC 56846058, 189624769, 750243800 (Confusingly, there are also "European Edition" versions of the 6th edition (ISBN 9781844498413) that contain slightly differing contents.)
1. The New Real Book, compiled & edited by Chuck Sher (Charles D. Sher; born 1947) & Sky Evergreen (aka Bob Bauer; né Robert E. Bauer; 1956–1997), Sher Music (publisher) (1988)
  1st Edition, C & vocal version OCLC 311905162
  Volume I
  Volume II
  Volume III ISBN 978-1-883217-03-7

== Similar books ==
Some other music publishers also apply the term Real Book to their own publications.

- The Associated Board of the Royal Schools of Music publishes The AB Real Book.
- Alfred Publishing Co. has several Real Books.
- Sher Music Co. publishes The New Real Book, in 3 volumes. The collection of tunes differs from that of the original Real Book. This edition offers some of the same songs, with different transcriptions and notation.

== See also ==
- Ralph Patt, author of The Vanilla Book of 400 chord progressions for jazz standards
- Chas. H. Hansen Music Corp., pioneer publisher of legitimate fake books
