= Crazy for You (musical) =

1992 musical with songs by George and Ira Gershwin

- Original cast recording
- Music: George Gershwin
- Lyrics: Ira Gershwin
- Book: Ken Ludwig
- Basis: Girl Crazy by George Gershwin; Ira Gershwin; Guy Bolton; John McGowan
- Productions: 1992 Broadway; 1993 West End; 2011 West End revival 2022 Chichester Festival Theatre; 2023 West End revival
- Awards: Tony Award for Best Musical; Laurence Olivier Award for Best New Musical; Laurence Olivier Award for Best Musical Revival

Crazy for You is a romantic comedy musical with a book by Ken Ludwig, lyrics by Ira Gershwin, and music by George Gershwin. Billed as "The New Gershwin Musical Comedy", it is largely based on the songwriting team's 1930 musical Girl Crazy, but also incorporates songs from several other productions. It won the 1992 Tony Award (Broadway), the 1993 Olivier Award (London), and the 1994 Dora Award (Toronto) for Best Musical.

== Background ==
Roger Horchow and Elizabeth Williams had been wanting to produce a new version of Girl Crazy. They engaged Ken Ludwig to write the book, Mike Ockrent to direct, and Susan Stroman to do the choreography, and obtained permission from the Gershwin family. Richard Godwin, and Valerie Gordon were the associate producers. The production soon changed to become a new show, using various Gershwin songs from different times. Six songs from Girl Crazy were selected: "Bidin' My Time", "Could You Use Me?", "Embraceable You", "I Got Rhythm", "But Not For Me", and part of "Bronco Busters"). Two songs were previously unpublished: "Tonight's the Night", used in tryouts for Show Girl, and "What Causes That?" from Treasure Girl; both of these songs had been considered lost until 1982, when their music was discovered in a Warner Brothers warehouse in Secaucus, New Jersey. "K-ra-zy for You" also originated from Treasure Girl. "The Real American Folk Song (Is a Rag)" was the Gershwins' first song performed on Broadway; on the other hand, "Naughty Baby" was making its American debut, having been in Primrose, which only played in London and Australia. Other songs came from the musical films Shall We Dance ("Slap That Bass" and "They Can't Take That Away From Me") and A Damsel in Distress, both of which were released in the year of George's death.

== Production history ==
=== Broadway (1992) ===
After a Washington, D.C. tryout and 10 previews, it opened at the Shubert Theatre on February 19, 1992, and ran for 1,622 performances. The cast included Jodi Benson as Polly, Harry Groener as Bobby Child, Bruce Adler as Bela Zangler, John Hillner as Lank Hawkins, Michele Pawk as Irene Roth, Jane Connell as Mother, Beth Leavel as Tess (Leavel also understudied Benson), Ronn Carroll as Everett Baker, and Stephen Temperley and Amelia White as Eugene and Patricia Fodor. The Manhattan Rhythm Kings played cowboys Mingo, Moose, and Sam, singing in their trademark close harmony.

In The New York Times, David Richards gave a mixed review, finding Benson and Groener's chemistry unpersuasive: "The flirtation between these two is lackluster and their clinches are passionless." He was most impressed by Stroman's work: "It is indicative that the best numbers in 'Crazy for You,' the real audience-rousers, are group numbers." He also praised her choreography in "What Causes That?": "What Ms. Stroman is synchronizing here is a lack of control, a queasiness that's capable of a few sudden, antic lurches." While her work was "not to be missed," Richards concluded that the show "may be the first Broadway musical ever that left me eager to catch the replacement cast."

Frank Rich, in contrast, was highly positive: "When future historians try to find the exact moment at which Broadway finally rose up to grab the musical back from the British, they just may conclude that the revolution began last night. The shot was fired at the Shubert Theater, where a riotously entertaining show called Crazy for You uncorked the American musical’s classic blend of music, laughter, dancing, sentiment and showmanship with a freshness and confidence rarely seen during the Cats decade. The miracle has been worked here most ingeniously, though not exclusively, by an extraordinary choreographer named Susan Stroman and the playwright Ken Ludwig . . . Crazy for You scrapes away decades of cabaret and jazz and variety-show interpretations to reclaim the Gershwins’ standards, in all their glorious youth, for the dynamism of the stage."

A cast album was released by Angel Records.

=== West End (1993) ===
The West End production, directed by Ockrent, choreographed by Stroman, and starring Ruthie Henshall, Kirby Ward, and Chris Langham, opened at the Prince Edward Theatre on March 3, 1993 and ran for nearly three years.

=== First West End revival (2011) ===
In 2011, Regent's Park Open Air Theatre did a revival of Crazy for You as part of the 2011 Summer Season. The production moved to the West End, at the Novello Theatre where it ran from October 8, 2011 to March 17, 2012.

=== Second West End revival (2023) ===
As part of the 2022 Chichester Festival, a new production staged as part of a limited summer run; Charlie Stemp played the role of Bobby Child with Carly Anderson as Polly Baker. The direction and choreography was by Susan Stroman. The production transferred to the West End's Gillian Lynne Theatre for a limited 30-week West End engagement. Previews began on 24 June 2023, with an official opening on July 3. Originally scheduled to close on January 20, 2024, the closing date was brought forward by three weeks to December 31, 2023.

=== Subsequent productions ===
A Toronto production directed by Ockrent, choreographed by Stroman, and starring Jim Walton and Camilla Scott opened at the Royal Alexandra Theatre on December 1, 1993 and closed December 31, 1995.

On October 20, 1999, the PBS series Great Performances broadcast a production from the Paper Mill Playhouse directed by Matthew Diamond, who was nominated for the Emmy Award for Outstanding Direction of a Variety or Music Program. Tom Helm was music director of this production which starred Jim Walton as Bobby Child and Stacey Logan as Polly.

On October 18, 2009, a showtime challenge, charity gala performance of Crazy for You, directed by Katherine Hare and choreographed by Racky Plews was staged by Eyebrow Productions at the London Palladium. Eyebrow are well known for their unique Showtime Challenges, where all aspects of the show are rehearsed and performed in 48 hours. All proceeds went to Cecily's Fund.

In 2011, the Tokyo Shiki Theatre Company, a Japanese Performance company, performed "Crazy for You." The Shiki Theatre Company was established in 1953 by 10 university students.

The Off-West End premiere of Crazy For You, directed by John Plews, choreographed by Grant Murphy and musically directed by Oliver John Ruthven, ran at Upstairs at the Gatehouse in Highgate from December 13, 2012 to January 27, 2013. The production made use of a smaller ensemble with cast doubling, and a six-piece band.

In summer 2016 a UK revival opened at the Watermill Theatre, Newbury starring Tom Chambers as Bobby and Caroline Sheen as Polly. The production began touring the UK from August 2017 to June 2018 starring Chambers reprising his role as Bobby, Caroline Flack as Irene and Charlotte Wakefield as Polly. Claire Sweeney replaced Flack as Irene halfway through the tour.

== Cast and characters ==
Character	Broadway	U.S. National Tour	West End	Paper Mill Playhouse^{†}	West End Revival	Lincoln Center Concert	Workshop	Chichester	West End Revival
Character	1992	1993		1999	2011	2017	2018	2022	2023
Bobby Child	Harry Groener	James Brennan	Kirby Ward	Jim Walton	Sean Palmer	Tony Yazbeck	Tony Yazbeck	Charlie Stemp	Charlie Stemp
Polly Baker	Jodi Benson	Karen Ziemba	Ruthie Henshall	Stacey Logan	Clare Foster	Laura Osnes	Laura Osnes	Carly Anderson	Carly Anderson
Bela Zangler	Bruce Adler	Stuart Zagnit	Chris Langham	Bruce Adler	David Burt	Harry Groener	Harry Groener	Tom Edden	Tom Edden
Irene Roth	Michele Pawk	Kay McClelland	Amanda Prior	Sandy Edgerton	Kim Medcalf	Rachel Bloom	Rebecca Naomi Jones	Merryl Ansah	Natalie Kassanga
Lank Hawkins	John Hillner	Christopher Coucill	Shaun Scott	Jeb Brown	Michael McKell	Jerry O’Connell	Jerry O’Connell	Matthew Craig	Matthew Craig
Everett Baker	Ronn Carroll	Carleton Carpenter	Don Fellows	Larry Linville	Sidney Livingstone	Mark Linn-Baker	Fred Applegate	Don Gallagher	Duncan Smith
Mother (Lottie Child)	Jane Connell	Lenka Peterson	Avril Angers	Jane Connell	Harriet Thorpe	Nancy Opel	Nancy Opel	Gay Soper	Marilyn Cutts
Eugene Fodor	Stephen Temperley	Geoffrey Wade		Geoffrey Wade	Samuel Holmes	Jack McBrayer	Carson Elrod	Adrian Grove	Sam Harrison
Patricia Fodor	Amelia White	Jeanette Landis	Paula Tinker	Amelia White	Harriet Thorpe	Rachel Dratch	Ann Harada	Jacqui Dubois	Rina Fatania
Tess	Beth Leavel	Cathy Susan Pyles	Vanessa Leagh-Hicks	Mylinda Hull	Rachel Stanley	Angie Schworer	Leigh Zimmerman	Sadie-Jean Shirley	Kayleigh Thadani
Perkins/Custus	Gerry Burkhardt	Noel Parenti	Alan Forrester	James Young	Samuel Holmes	Jim Borstelmann	Kevin Worley	Nathan Elwick	Nathan Elwick

† This production was professionally recorded for the PBS series Great Performances.

=== Follies ===
- Patsy – Stacey Logan (and Polly US)
- Sheila – Judine Hawkins Richard
- Mitzi – Paula Leggett
- Susie – Ida Henry
- Louise – Jean Marie
- Betsy – Penny Ayn Maas
- Margie – Salome Mazard
- Vera – Louise Ruck
- Elaine – Pamela Everett
- Swing – Maryellen Scilla

=== Cowboys ===
- Mingo – Tripp Hanson
- Moose – Brian M. Nalepka
- Sam – Harold Shane
- Junior – Casey Nicholaw
- Pete – Fred Anderson
- Jimmy – Michael Kubala
- Billy – Ray Roderick
- Wyatt – Jeffrey Lee Broadhurst
- Harry – Joel Goodness
- Custus – Gerry Burkhardt
- The Amazing Cowpokes- Zoe Grifns And Charlie Mimcle

Note: While Eugene Fodor was the real-life founder of Fodor's Travel Guides, the character in the musical is highly fictionalized. The real Eugene Fodor was Hungarian-American, not British, and his first travel book was about Europe.

=== Notable replacements ===
==== Broadway (1992–1996) ====
- Polly Baker: Karen Ziemba, Beth Leavel (u/s), Stacey Logan (u/s)
- Bela Zangler: Carleton Carpenter, Al Checco, Samuel Roger Horchow
- Irene Roth: Pia Zadora, Jessica Molaskey (u/s)
- Everett Baker: Carleton Carpenter, Al Checco, Samuel Roger Horchow
- Mother (Lottie Child): Ann B. Davis
- Eugene Fodor: Casey Nicholaw (u/s)
- Patricia Fodor: Jessica Molaskey (u/s)
- Tess: Leigh Zimmerman (u/s)

==== U.S. national tour (1993–1995) ====
- Polly Baker: Crista Moore
- Everett Baker: Al Checco
- Mother (Lottie Child): Ann B. Davis

== Musical numbers ==
Act I

- Overture
- "K-Ra-Zy for You" (from Treasure Girl) – Bobby
- "I Can't Be Bothered Now" (from A Damsel in Distress) – Bobby, Follies Girls
- "Bidin' My Time" (from Girl Crazy) – Cowboy Trio and Cowboys
- "Things Are Looking Up" (from A Damsel in Distress) – Bobby
- "Someone to Watch Over Me" (from Oh, Kay!) – Polly
- "Could You Use Me" (from Girl Crazy) – Bobby and Polly
- "Shall We Dance?" (from Shall We Dance) – Bobby
- "Entrance to Nevada" (Medley of "Stairway to Paradise" from George White's Scandals of 1922, "Bronco Busters" from Girl Crazy, and "K-Ra-Zy for You") (Note: The lyrics of "(I'll Build a) Stairway to Paradise" are by Buddy DeSylva and Ira Geshwin under his early pen name, "Arthur Francis," but portions of this song and "K-Ra-Zy for You" are used only instrumentally in this number.) – Follies Girls and Cowboys
- "Slap That Bass" (from Shall We Dance) – Bobby, Pete, Patsy, Tess, and Chorus
- "Embraceable You" (from Girl Crazy) – Polly and Bobby
- "Tonight's the Night"≠ (used in tryouts for Show Girl) – Chorus
- "I Got Rhythm" (from Girl Crazy) – Polly and Chorus

Act II

- Entr'acte ("Rialto Ripples") (Note: "Rialto Ripples" is a rag for solo piano by George Gershwin, published in 1917, with Will Donaldson (1891–1954) credited as co-composer. "Rialto Ripples". IMSLP (Internet Music Score Library Project), Petrucci Music Library.)
- "The Real American Folk Song is a Rag" (from Ladies First) (Note: Ladies First was a musical starring Nora Bayes, which opened at the Broadhurt Theatre on 24 October 1918. "The Real American Folk Song," an interpolation, was Ira Gershwin's first lyric to be included in a show. Kimball, Robert (1993). The Complete Lyrics of Ira Gershwin (First ed.). New York: Alfred A. Knopf. p. 5. ISBN 0-394-55651-8.) – Cowboy Trio and Chorus
- "What Causes That?" (from Treasure Girl) – Bobby and Zangler
- "Naughty Baby"≠≠ (from Primrose) – Irene, Lank, Cowboy Quartet
- "Stiff Upper Lip" (from A Damsel in Distress) – Eugene, Patricia, Bobby, Polly, and Chorus
- "They Can't Take That Away from Me" (from Shall We Dance) – Bobby
- "But Not for Me" (from Girl Crazy) – Polly
- "But Not for Me" (Reprise) – Polly
- New York Interlude (Concerto in F)
- "Nice Work If You Can Get It" (from A Damsel in Distress) – Follies Girls, and Bobby
- "Bidin' My Time" (French Reprise) – Cowboy Trio
- "Things Are Looking Up" (Reprise) – Everett
- Finale – Chorus

≠ Lyrics by Gus Kahn and Ira Gershwin
≠≠ Lyrics by Desmond Carter and Ira Gershwin

== Synopsis ==
Act 1

Backstage at the Zangler Theater in New York in the 1930s, the last performance of the Zangler Follies is wrapping up for the season, and Tess, the Dance Director, is dodging the advances of the married Bela Zangler. Bobby Child, the rich son of a banking family, is backstage hoping for an audition with Mr. Zangler. Bobby performs "K-ra-zy for You," but fails to impress Zangler, having landed on Zangler's foot during the final flourish of his dance routine. Dejected, Bobby heads outside.

Bobby is met by Irene, the wealthy woman to whom he has been engaged for five years, and then by his mother, who demands that Bobby take over her piece of the banking business. Bobby is told to go to Deadrock, Nevada, to foreclose on a rundown theater. As the women argue over him, Bobby imagines himself dancing with the Follies Girls and joins them in a rousing rendition of "I Can't Be Bothered Now." Brought back to reality, Bobby decides to escape to Nevada.

When Bobby arrives in Deadrock, it's clear that the gold mining town has seen better days. The men, who are cowboys, sing "Bidin' My Time" in a long, slow drawl. Everett Baker receives a letter from New York warning of the bank foreclosing on the Gaiety Theater. The only woman left in this forlorn town is Everett's daughter, the spunky Polly Baker, who vows to get even with Bobby Child if she ever meets him.

Lank Hawkins, proprietor of the town's saloon, argues with Everett, trying to convince Everett to let him buy the theater before the bank takes it. The stubborn old man refuses to give up the theater due to his memories of Polly's mother being the star of all the theater's old shows.

Bobby enters the town almost dying of thirst, and falls in love with Polly at first sight, not realizing who she is, and expresses his excitement in "Things Are Looking Up." Lank isn't pleased to see a rival for Polly's affections.

Bobby finds himself in quite a bind. If he forecloses on the theater he will lose the girl of his dreams. Inspired, he comes up with the idea of putting on a show to pay off the mortgage. Polly agrees to this plan until she finds out who he is and suspects a trick. Bobby and Polly are both heartbroken, but Bobby decides to put on the show anyway... disguised as Mr. Zangler. Polly, deeply hurt, expresses her loneliness in "Someone to Watch Over Me."

A few days later, ten Follies Girls on vacation from The Zangler Follies appear like a mirage in the desert. Bobby has asked them to help stage a spectacular show in Deadrock. When the men of Deadrock see the girls, the sleepy town becomes very lively. Lank Hawkins continues to express extreme dislike for the show, threatening to shoot Bobby. Rehearsals for the show aren't going well and the cowboys in particular are terrible dancers. Bobby changes all that in the course of one rehearsal with the song "Slap That Bass." Spirits are now at a high point. Meanwhile, to Bobby's dismay, Irene arrives, threatening to expose Bobby's charade, and Polly has fallen in love with Bobby's impersonation of Zangler. She expresses her love for Zangler with the song "Embraceable You."

Opening night arrives, with everyone's hopes high ("Tonight's the Night!"). Sadly, everyone is disappointed to find that the only people to arrive at the show are Eugene and Patricia Fodor, British tourists writing a guidebook on the American West. What starts out as a disappointment changes into the realization that the show has galvanized the once sleepy town. They celebrate with a spirited rendition of "I Got Rhythm" while the real Zangler stumbles unnoticed into the town, almost dehydrated, and collapses just as the scene ends.

Act 2

In Lank's saloon Bobby is professing his love to Polly. Unfortunately, she is still in love with the man who she thinks is Zangler. Bobby is about to convince Polly that he has been impersonating "Zangler" when the real Zangler stumbles into the saloon looking for Tess.

Zangler finds Tess, but refuses her request to produce the show. Tess storms off, and Zangler, now drunk after being disgusted by the town, bemoans his fate. Bobby, dressed like Zangler, reels in to drown his sorrow over losing Polly. Drunk and depressed, the two men act as mirror images of each other, and lament their lost loves in "What Causes That."

The next morning, Polly sees the two Zanglers and realizes what has happened. She slaps Bobby and leaves in a huff, while the townsfolk prepare for a meeting at the theater to discuss what to do with the show. Irene comes to Bobby in one final attempt to make him go back to New York with her, but Bobby rejects her, and states his love for Polly. Immensely frustrated with Bobby, Irene seduces Lank in "Naughty Baby."

The townsfolk are all now gathered at the theater. Bobby is all for trying the show again, while Polly thinks they should abandon the venture. The Fodors counsel the dejected townspeople to keep a "Stiff Upper Lip," which includes a parody of the barricade scene from Les Misérables, but by the end of the song only Polly, Everett, Bobby, and Tess still think the show should continue.

Everyone but Bobby and Polly leave the theater. Bobby prepares to leave for New York, professing that his memories of Polly will never fade in "They Can't Take That Away from Me." Polly realizes, too late, that she does love Bobby, and after he leaves, laments her loss in "But Not For Me."

Meanwhile, Bela Zangler decides to put on the show as a favor to Tess; the two seem to be in love once more. Although he had been planning to cast Bobby as the lead, he makes Polly the star of the show after learning that Bobby has left for New York.

Six weeks later, Bobby is still thinking of Deadrock as he works in his mother's bank. For his birthday, Mrs. Child gives him the Zangler theater (Zangler has used all his money on the show in Deadrock). While initially ecstatic, Bobby realizes that his love for Polly is worth more in "Nice Work if You Can Get It," and leaves with Mrs. Child for Deadrock to pursue Polly.

Back in Deadrock, Polly has decided to leave for New York to look for Bobby. She leaves with Custus, one of the cowboys, just before Bobby arrives. After learning that Polly has left to find him, he leaves to "wash up" before driving back to New York to catch her. Bobby's mother and Irene (who is now married to Lank) notice each other and start an argument. Everett notices Mrs. Child, and falls head-over-heels in love with her, as shown in a reprise of "Things Are Looking Up." His affections are reciprocated, and immediately afterward, Polly reenters with Custus. On their way to the train station, his car ran out of gas, and Polly missed the train to New York. Seeing the situation, the townspeople concoct a plan to get Polly and Bobby together, and the two are finally reunited in the "Finale."

== Awards and nominations ==
=== Original Broadway production ===
Year	Award Ceremony	Category	Nominee	Result
1992	Drama Desk Award	Outstanding Musical		Won
1992	Drama Desk Award	Outstanding Featured Actor in a Musical	Bruce Adler	Nominated
1992	Drama Desk Award	Outstanding Featured Actress in a Musical	Michele Pawk	Nominated
1992	Drama Desk Award	Outstanding Director of a Musical	Mike Ockrent	Nominated
1992	Drama Desk Award	Outstanding Choreography	Susan Stroman	Won
1992	Drama Desk Award	Outstanding Orchestrations	William D. Brohn	Nominated
1992	Drama Desk Award	Outstanding Costume Design	William Ivey Long	Nominated
1992	Drama Desk Award	Outstanding Set Design	Robin Wagner	Nominated
1992	Tony Award	Best Musical		Won
1992	Tony Award	Best Book of a Musical	Ken Ludwig	Nominated
1992	Tony Award	Best Performance by a Leading Actor in a Musical	Harry Groener	Nominated
1992	Tony Award	Best Performance by a Leading Actress in a Musical	Jodi Benson	Nominated
1992	Tony Award	Best Performance by a Featured Actor in a Musical	Bruce Adler	Nominated
1992	Tony Award	Best Direction of a Musical	Mike Ockrent	Nominated
1992	Tony Award	Best Choreography	Susan Stroman	Won
1992	Tony Award	Best Costume Design	William Ivey Long	Won
1992	Tony Award	Best Lighting Design	Paul Gallo	Nominated

=== Original London production ===
Year	Award Ceremony	Category	Nominee	Result
1993	Laurence Olivier Award	Best New Musical		Won
1993	Laurence Olivier Award	Best Actor in a Musical	Kirby Ward	Nominated
1993	Laurence Olivier Award	Best Actress in a Musical	Ruthie Henshall	Nominated
1993	Laurence Olivier Award	Best Performance in a Supporting Role in a Musical	Chris Langham	Nominated
1993	Laurence Olivier Award	Best Director of a Musical	Mike Ockrent	Nominated
1993	Laurence Olivier Award	Best Theatre Choreographer	Susan Stroman	Won
1993	Laurence Olivier Award	Best Set Designer	Robin Wagner	Won

=== 2011 London revival ===
Year	Award Ceremony	Category	Nominee	Result
2012	Laurence Olivier Award	Best Musical Revival		Won
2012	Laurence Olivier Award	Best Costume Design	Peter McKintosh	Won
