= Sam and Delilah =

Song composed by George Gershwin

"Sam and Delilah" is a song composed by George Gershwin, with lyrics by Ira Gershwin. It was introduced by Ethel Merman in the 1930 musical Girl Crazy. The song is an interpretation of the biblical story of Samson and Delilah in the Book of Judges of the Hebrew Bible.

== Setting ==
"Sam and Delilah" appeared late in the first act of the musical, surprising audiences who had assumed that Merman was a non-singing member of the cast. Merman was unknown at the time of her appearance in the musical, which made her a star on Broadway. The historian Robert Payne described Merman as being dressed in a "black satin skirt, a low-cut red blouse and bangles up her arms" when performing the song which "stopped the play" due to its popularity with the audience. Ira Gershwin's biographer, Philip Furia, described the song as the first "full-scale rhythmic number" of Girl Crazy which "bowled [the audience] over". Merman subsequently recalled that "everybody screamed" in the audience in appreciation to her performance of the song on the opening night. Merman initially assumed the pandemonium was caused by something falling from the loft of the theater or the snapping of her garter. Ira Gershwin recalled that he was particularly relieved by the audience's appreciation of the song as he had not felt that his lyrics were his best work, but Merman had saved the song with her "ability to sustain any note for any human or humane length of time" feeling that "Few singers could give you koo-for seven beats and come through with a terrifically-tch at the end". Merman also performed "I Got Rhythm" and "Boy! What Love Has Done to Me!" in the musical. George Gershwin visited Merman in her dressing room in the interval and told her never to " ... let anybody ever give you a singing lesson. It'll ruin you".

== Context ==
In the musical the song is performed by Frisco Kate, a "floozy" from the Barbary Coast of San Francisco, and the lyrics are resplendent with contemporary slang and guttural consonants. Furia likened the tale told in the lyrics of "Sam and Delilah" to the story of the late 19th-century American ballad "Frankie and Johnny". George Gershwin's biographer Ean Wood describes the song as a "New York Jewish" version of "Frankie and Johnny". The musicologist Larry Starr describes the song as "dark, bluesy character with lyrics conveying an overtly sexual and ultimately violent story" and one of several songs in Girl Crazy that do not have earlier precedents in George and Ira Gershwin's musicals. In his 2009 book Daring, Disreputable and Devout: Interpreting the Hebrew Bible's Women in the Arts and Music the theologian Dan Clanton describes the song as being one of a number of songs that portray Delilah as being "completely responsible for Samson's demise" and that the motive of jealousy ascribed to Delilah in the lyrics of the song are absent in the Biblical account. The song also warns listeners against involvement with Delilah-like women, a theme later echoed in Neil Sedaka's 1960 song "Run Samson Run". The song refers to Delilah seducing Sam with her hoochie coochie dancing, to rhyme with the slang term "hooch" for illicit alcohol.

== Recordings ==
It was recorded by Louise Carlyle in Columbia Records's 1951 cast recording of Girl Crazy featuring Mary Martin and Eddie Chappell. Ella Fitzgerald performed it on her 1959 George and Ira Gershwin Songbook in an arrangement by Nelson Riddle released on Verve Records. Riddle's arrangement utilised an oboe to insinuate the "vamp" like nature of the song.
