= Nice Work If You Can Get It (musical) =

Broadway musical by the Gershwins

- Music: George Gershwin
- Lyrics: Ira Gershwin
- Book: Joe DiPietro
- Productions: 2012 Broadway; 2014 US tour 2015 Melbourne; 2018 London; 2021 Tokyo

Nice Work If You Can Get It is a musical featuring songs by George and Ira Gershwin, with a book written by Joe DiPietro, and based on material by Guy Bolton and P. G. Wodehouse. Nice Work premiered on Broadway in April 2012.

== Background ==
The musical was initially produced in 2001 at the Goodspeed Opera House titled They All Laughed!, with the book by Joe DiPietro and direction by Christopher Ashley. The musical received "mixed notices" according to Frank Rizzo, writing in the Hartford Courant. New collaborators and producers then became involved.

A workshop was held in November 2007, featuring Harry Connick, Jr. and Erin Dilly. At that time, the show was titled Heaven on Earth. The musical was first scheduled to debut at the Colonial Theatre in Boston, running from December 2008 through January 2009. The production was expected to open on Broadway in Spring 2009, with Harry Connick, Jr. However, in 2008 it was announced that the musical was "officially postponed", due to a change in the producing team; Connick ultimately left the project.

== Productions ==
Preview performances began on Broadway at the Imperial Theatre on March 29, 2012 with the opening on April 24, 2012. Directed and choreographed by Kathleen Marshall, the cast starred Matthew Broderick (Jimmy Winter) and Kelli O'Hara (Billie Bendix). The production closed on June 15, 2013, after 27 previews and 478 regular performances.

A US national tour started on September 2, 2014 at the Music Hall at Fair Park in Dallas, Texas, and ran, with an extended break for the winter holidays, until March 22, 2015. It finished at the Segerstrom Center for the Arts in Costa Mesa, California.

The Australian production, a non-replica production directed by Roger Hodgman for The Production Company, played at the State Theatre, Arts Centre Melbourne from August 15 to 23, 2015. It featured Rohan Browne, Esther Hannaford, Christie Whelan-Browne, John Wood, Gina Riley, George Kapiniaris, and Nicki Wendt.

The UK premiere ran at Upstairs at The Gatehouse in London from December 12, 2018 to January 27, 2019. It was directed by John Plews, with choreography by Grant Murphy, musical supervision by Charlie Ingles, musical direction by Chris Poon, design by Pollyanna Elston, sound design by Nico Menghini (assisted by Alistair Warr & Rachel Darwood), lighting design by Sam Waddington (assisted by Bethany Gupwell), costume supervision by Nadine Froehlich, wigs by Jessica Plews, and produced by Katie Plews for Ovation Productions.

The Japanese production of the musical by all-female theater troupe Takarazuka Revue ran from January 8 to February 9, 2021. Due to COVID-19 original schedule was heavily changed. It was directed by Ryou Harada with musical arrangement by Shouichi Tama.

The Queanbeyan production ran from 1 to 10 November 2024. The run opened to overwhelmingly positive reviews, with local publication CityNews describing the show as "not difficult to see".

== Cast and characters ==
Character	Goodspeed	Broadway	U.S. tour	Off West End	Japan
Character	2001	2012	2014	2018	2021
Jimmy Winter	James Ludwig	Matthew Broderick	Alex Enterline	Alistair So	Rei Yuzuka
Billie Bendix	Marla Schaffel	Kelli O'Hara	Mariah MacFarlane	Jessica-Elizabeth Nelson	Yuuki Hana
Cookie McGee	Michael McGrath	Michael McGrath	Reed Campbell	David Pendlebury	Kazuya Seto
Eileen Evergreen	Donna English	Jennifer Laura Thompson	Rachel Scarr	Charlotte Scally	Sea Towaki
Duke Mahoney	Mark Lotito	Chris Sullivan	Aaron Fried	Fraser Fraser	Tsukasa Hiryuu
Duchess Estonia Dulworth	Mary Beth Peil	Judy Kaye	Stephanie Harter Gilmore	Nova Skipp	Yume Marika
Senator Max Evergreen	Dennis Kelly	Terry Beaver	Benjamin Perez	Stuart Simons	Shou Kazumi
Jeannie Muldoon	Amanda Watkins	Robyn Hurder	Stephanie Gandolfo	Abigail Earnshaw	Kurisu Oto
Chief Berry	David Dollase	Stanley Wayne Mathis	Thomas Schario	Harry Cooper-Millar	Rei Natori
Millicent Winter	Diane J. Findlay	Estelle Parsons	Barbara Weetman	Grace McInerny	Aki Itsumine
Elliot				Adam Crossley	
Rosie				Kirsten Mackie	
Marco	Kevin Crewell				
Telegram Boy	Mike McGowan				

=== Notable Broadway replacements ===
- Jimmy Winter: Will Chase (August 2012)
- Billie Bendix: Erin Dilly (July 2012), Jessie Mueller (April 2013)
- Cookie McGee: Brad Oscar (January 2013-March 2013)
- Millicent Winter: Blythe Danner (December 2012-April 2013)
- Chief Berry: John Treacy Egan (March 2013-April 2013)
- Rosie: Emily Tyra (January 2013-April 2013)

== Plot ==
Act I
It's 1927, in the midst of a riotous bachelor party for the oft-married Jimmy Winter ("Sweet and Lowdown"). Outside, a trio of bootleggers – Cookie, Billie and Duke – are trying to figure out where to hide the 400 cases of gin they have stashed on their boat. As a stranger approaches, Duke and Cookie rush off. A drunken Jimmy staggers and comes across the pants-wearing Billie and is immediately smitten. He explains his plight – he must marry someone respectable or his mother will disinherit him, so he's marrying someone he doesn't truly love. Billie isn't all that interested in his tale of woe, until he reveals that he has a huge Long Island beach house that he never uses, so she swipes his wallet to discover the address. Jimmy assumes Billie is falling for him, but Billie insists that love is for suckers. Jimmy vehemently disagrees ("Nice Work If You Can Get It"). Jimmy passes out, and Billie focuses on this interesting man unconscious on the ground before her ("Nice Work If You Can Get It - Reprise"). Cookie and Duke rush back on, and Billie tells them that she found a place to store their bootleg – a Long Island beach house. A police whistle pierces the air, and the bootleggers scatter. Senator Max Evergreen and Chief Berry enter, along with Duchess Estonia Dulworth, who has brought along her Vice Squad and vows to rid society of its greatest evil ("Demon Rum").

The next morning, Billie, Cookie and Duke have stored their 400 cases of gin in the cellar of Jimmy's ritzy beach house. Eileen Evergreen, the finest interpreter of modern dance in the world, enters with Jimmy. They were married that morning, and they are on their honeymoon, though Eileen has yet to allow Jimmy to touch her. Cookie, disguised as a butler, enters and they naturally assume he's their servant. They send him off, and Eileen tells Jimmy that she's ready for the honeymoon shenanigans to begin – as soon as she takes a bath. She exits into the house as Billie enters, stunned to see Jimmy. Jimmy has no memory of meeting her last night, and as Jimmy flirts with her, Billie confesses that she's never been kissed. Strictly for educational purposes, Jimmy kisses Billie, and she realizes what she's been missing ("Someone to Watch Over Me").

Four and a half hours later, Eileen is still bathing ("Delishious"). In the ritzy living room, Cookie and Billie devise a plan for Billie to distract Jimmy from the 400 cases of gin in his cellar. Billie runs off as Jimmy enters, followed by a gaggle of chorus girls who invite him for a group swim, which Jimmy almost accepts ("I've Got to be There"). Eileen enters with a flourish, and just as she is about to let Jimmy touch her, he receives a telegram revealing that his last wife has refused to sign the annulment, and an irate Eileen storms off to get her father. That night in Jimmy's ritzy bedroom, Billie breaks in and tries to seduce him, badly ("Treat Me Rough"). Chief Berry, who has been pursuing Billie, barges in to arrest her. But Jimmy convinces him that Billie is actually his newest wife ("Let's Call the Whole Thing Off") and Billie and Jimmy are forced to spend the whole night together in his bedroom.

The next morning, Jeannie, a happy-go-lucky chorus girl, comes upon Duke, a lug from New Jersey, and mistakes him for an actual English Duke. Duke, who is perpetually nervous around women, tries to escape, but Jeannie does everything in her power to get him to notice her ("Do it Again").

In the ritzy living room, Jimmy and Billie realize that they are hopelessly in love ("'S Wonderful") But Eileen returns with her father – the ultra-conservative Senator Evergreen – and her aunt – the Duchess Estonia Dulworth – to demand that Jimmy and Eileen have a legal wedding. Jimmy has no choice but to marry Eileen, and Billie pretends to be a cockney maid so she can stick around and guard the bootleg. As Eileen beelines towards the cellar to get the wedding china, Jimmy and Cookie frantically distract the wedding party away from the basement ("Fascinating Rhythm") as the curtain falls.

Act II
On the ritzy terrace, the Vice Squad and Chorus Girls revel ("Lady Be Good"). Billie enters and realizes she'll never be as happy as the dancing revelers around her ("But Not For Me"). Cookie and Duke enter and, since they're all now disguised as servants, they plot how they can get the impending wedding luncheon over and done with as quickly as possible. The Duchess barrels on to instruct Cookie in the finer points of luncheon preparation. She insists on hiring a string quartet for entertainment, but Cookie has other ideas ("By Strauss" / "Sweet and Lowdown - Reprise").

As Billie sets the ritzy luncheon table, Jimmy makes one last attempt to appease her ("Do, Do, Do"). But Billie will have none of it. As the luncheon begins, Cookie and Duke frantically serve the luncheon guests, and the Duchess continues to annoy Cookie, who spikes her lemonade with Gin. Billie entertains them all with a cockney song ("Hangin' Around With You") which mainly serves as an excuse to keep pouring hot soup on Jimmy's lap. But Billie accidentally pours some steaming soup onto Eileen, who immediately fires her. The Duchess, now happily drunk, defends Billie and reveals a deep secret as she grabs onto Cookie, climbs on the luncheon table and swings from a chandelier ("Looking for a Boy"). After he drags off the Duchess, an angry Jimmy calls Billie a common criminal, and they realize that they can never be together. Jimmy goes to prepare for his wedding, as Jeannie enters looking for Duke, who Billie accidentally reveals isn't a real duke. Jeannie is furious, so Duke tries to win her over with a poem ("Blah Blah Blah"), but Jeannie rushes away.

In the ritzy bedroom, Cookie is dressing Jimmy for his wedding as Billie enters to return his wallet. Jimmy and Billie both realize that this is the last time they'll ever see each other ("Will You Remember Me?").

The Chorus Girls and Vice Squad set up the wedding ("I've Got To Be There - Reprise"). As Senator Evergreen presides, Eileen makes her very grand entrance ("I've Got a Crush on You"). But just before vows are exchanged, Cookie and Duke rush in, pretending to be Prohibition Agents, though Chief Berry quickly enters and reveals their true identities. As they're arrested, Jeannie rushes in and proclaims her love for Duke, then the now sober Duchess proclaims her love for Cookie. Still, Senator Evergreen insists the bootleggers must be arrested, but Jimmy's mother, Millicent, makes an appearance, revealing the true nature of her son's heritage – Senator Evergreen is Jimmy's father. The senator proclaims the day a joyous one and all are free to pursue their new and surprising loves. Jimmy realizes that Billie has rushed to the boathouse to sail away forever, and he rushes to swear his devotion to her. Millicent follows and reveals that she happens to be the biggest rum-runner on Long Island, and she'd like Billie to marry her son and take over her business. Billie happily accepts ("Someone to Watch Over Me - Reprise"). And on the ritzy terrace under a starry night, love has blossomed, the bootleg is opened and the company celebrates their newfound joy ("They All Laughed!").

== Musical numbers ==
Act 1

- "Sweet and Lowdown" – Jimmy, Jeannie, Chorus Girls and Society Guys
- "Nice Work If You Can Get It" – Jimmy and Billie
- "Nice Work If You Can Get It" (Reprise) – Billie
- "Demon Rum" – Duchess, Chief Berry, Senator and Vice Squad
- "Someone to Watch Over Me" – Billie
- "Delishious" – Eileen, Bubble Girls and Boys
- "I've Got to Be There" – Jimmy, Jeannie and Chorus Girls
- "I've Got to Be There" (Reprise) – Jeannie and Chorus Girls
- "Treat Me Rough" – Billie
- "Let's Call the Whole Thing Off" – Jimmy, Billie and Chief Berry
- "Do It Again" – Jeannie and Duke
- "'S Wonderful" – Jimmy and Billie
- "Fascinating Rhythm" – Jimmy, Cookie and Company

Act 2

- "Lady Be Good" – Orchestra
- "But Not for Me" – Billie
- "By Strauss" – Duchess
- "Sweet and Lowdown" (Reprise) – Cookie
- "Do, Do, Do" – Jimmy, Elliot, Vic and Floyd
- "Hangin' Around With You" – Billie
- "Looking for a Boy" – Duchess and Cookie
- "Blah, Blah, Blah" – Duke
- "Let's Call the Whole Thing Off" (Reprise) – Billie and Jimmy
- "Will You Remember Me?" – Billie and Jimmy
- "I've Got to Be There" (Reprise) – Chorus Girls and Vice Squad
- "I've Got a Crush on You" – Eileen, Chorus Girls and Vice Squad
- "Blah, Blah, Blah" (Reprise) – Jeannie and Duke
- "Looking for a Boy" (Reprise) – Cookie and Duchess
- "Delishious" (Reprise) – Chief Berry and Eileen
- "Someone to Watch Over Me" (Reprise) – Jimmy and Billie
- "They All Laughed" – Full Company

== Reception ==
Reviews of the Broadway production were mixed. Ben Brantley, in his New York Times review, wrote: "Every now and then, a bubble of pure, tickling charm rises from the artificial froth of “Nice Work if You Can Get It,” the pastiche of a 1920s musical featuring songs by George and Ira Gershwin. Most of this show, which opened on Tuesday night at the Imperial Theater, registers as a shiny, dutiful trickle of jokes and dance numbers performed by talented people who don't entirely connect with the whimsy of a bygone genre. [...] But then, all at once, there's a moment of delicate ridiculousness, of utterly credible improbability, that signals what Kathleen Marshall, the production's director and choreographer, must have been aiming for."

The USA Today reviewer wrote: "[...] director/choreographer Kathleen Marshall and a stellar cast ensure that the show is as charming in execution as it is disheartening in theory. [...] For every sharp line, there are a couple that will make you wince — or would, if they weren't delivered with such disarming spirit and skill. [...] Broderick fares predictably well in the kind of role he does best: a sweetly deadpan social doofus. O'Hara proves once again that there's pretty much nothing she can't do on stage. [...] [T]he excellent Judy Kaye, playing a smug Prohibition advocate, sips spiked lemonade and gets flamboyantly frisky."

The Newsday reviewer wrote: "Kathleen Marshall [...] has put together a rowdy, dopey-smart, dance-driven screwball comedy that never shies from the extravagant edge of clunky silliness. Kelli O'Hara and Matthew Broderick may not seem a likely romantic couple. But their different styles -- her crisp and sublime professionalism, his sleepy-faced cunning naiveté and low-watt skills -- spark unexpected chemistry. At least they are very sweet together. Joe DiPietro [...] has used some outlines of "Oh, Kay," a genuine Prohibition fluff ball from 1926, for his new story. He switches the power of the illegal-hooch gang from the guys to a plucky woman in guy's clothes—O'Hara."

== Original cast recording ==
An original Broadway cast recording was recorded in May 2012 for the Shout! Factory label and distributed by Sony Records. The album was released in September 2012.

== Awards and nominations ==
=== Original Broadway production ===
Year	Award	Category	Nominee	Result
2012	Tony Award	Best Musical		Nominated
2012	Tony Award	Best Book of a Musical	Joe DiPietro	Nominated
2012	Tony Award	Best Performance by a Leading Actress in a Musical	Kelli O'Hara	Nominated
2012	Tony Award	Best Performance by a Featured Actor in a Musical	Michael McGrath	Won
2012	Tony Award	Best Performance by a Featured Actress in a Musical	Judy Kaye	Won
2012	Tony Award	Best Direction of a Musical	Kathleen Marshall	Nominated
2012	Tony Award	Best Choreography	Kathleen Marshall	Nominated
2012	Tony Award	Best Orchestrations	Bill Elliott	Nominated
2012	Tony Award	Best Costume Design	Martin Pakledinaz	Nominated
2012	Tony Award	Best Sound Design	Brian Ronan	Nominated
2012	Drama Desk Award	Outstanding Musical		Nominated
2012	Drama Desk Award	Outstanding Book of a Musical	Joe DiPietro	Won
2012	Drama Desk Award	Outstanding Actress in a Musical	Kelli O'Hara	Nominated
2012	Drama Desk Award	Outstanding Featured Actor in a Musical	Michael McGrath	Won
2012	Drama Desk Award	Outstanding Featured Actress in a Musical	Judy Kaye	Won
2012	Drama Desk Award	Outstanding Director of a Musical	Kathleen Marshall	Nominated
2012	Drama Desk Award	Outstanding Choreography	Kathleen Marshall	Nominated
2012	Drama Desk Award	Outstanding Costume Design	Martin Pakledinaz	Nominated
2012	Grammy Award	Best Musical Theater Album		Nominated
