= When the Boys Meet the Girls (film) =

1965 film

- Directed by: Alvin Ganzer
- Screenplay by: Robert E. Kent
- Based on: Girl Crazy; 1930 musical by: Guy Bolton; Jack McGowan
- Produced by: Sam Katzman
- Starring: Connie Francis; Harve Presnell
- Cinematography: Paul C. Vogel
- Edited by: Ben Lewis
- Music by: Fred Karger
- Production company: Four Leaf Productions
- Distributed by: Metro-Goldwyn-Mayer
- Release date: October 10, 1965
- Running time: 97 minutes
- Country: United States
- Language: English

When the Boys Meet the Girls is a 1965 American musical film directed by Alvin Ganzer and starring Connie Francis and Harve Presnell based on the musical Girl Crazy and a remake of MGM's 1943 film Girl Crazy.

== Plot ==
A playboy (Harve Presnell) helps a young woman (Connie Francis) turn her father's Nevada ranch into a haven for divorcees.

== Cast ==
- Connie Francis – Ginger Gray
- Harve Presnell – Danny Churchill
- Peter Noone – Himself (as Herman's Hermits)
- Karl Green – Himself (as Herman's Hermits)
- Derek Leckenby – Himself (as Herman's Hermits)
- Keith Hopwood – Himself (as Herman's Hermits)
- Barry Whitwam – Himself (as Herman's Hermits)
- Louis Armstrong – Himself
- Buddy Catlett – Himself
- Domingo Samudio – Sam the Sham (as Sam the Sham)
- Dave Martin – Pharaoh (as The Pharaohs)
- Ray Stinnet – Pharaoh (as The Pharaohs)
- Jerry Patterson – Pharaoh (as The Pharaohs)
- Butch Gibson – Pharaoh (as The Pharaohs)
- Liberace – Himself
- Sue Ane Langdon – Tess Rawley
- Fred Clark – Bill Denning
- Frank Faylen – Phin Gray
- Joby Baker – Sam
- Hortense Petra – Kate
- Stanley Adams – Lank
- Romo Vincent – Pete
- Susan Holloway – Delilah
- Russell Collins – Mr. Stokes (as Russ Collins)
- Pepper Davis – Himself
- Bill Quinn – Dean of Colby (as William I. Quinn)
- Tony Reese – Himself

== Production ==
The film was a remake of MGM's Girl Crazy. The remake was produced by Sam Katzman, who made it as the first of five films he did for the studio in 1965. In April 1965 Connie Francis was attached as star.

In June 1965 Jeffrey Hayden was to direct and the stars were announced as Connie Francis, Harve Presnell, Paul Anka, Fran Jeffries and Louis Armstrong.

The title was changed to I've Got Rhythm then When the Boys Meet the Girls.

Presnell played the same role as Mickey Rooney in the original. Presnell said "When we did Molly Brown on Broadway, we had a standing joke whenever I didn't do something right. I said 'Well why don't you get Mickey Rooney?'."

Filming began in mid-July and lasted until early August. Herman's Hermits filmed their scenes in two days before departing for New York City. MGM were so pleased with their performance they put them in a series of films.

== Soundtrack ==
When the Boys Meet the Girls

Soundtrack album by Various artists
- Released: 1966
- Length: 29:51
- Label: MGM

Herman's Hermits British chronology
A Must to Avoid (1966)	When the Boys Meet the Girls (1966)	Hold On! (1966)

Herman's Hermits American chronology
Herman's Hermits on Tour (1965)	When the Boys Meet the Girls (1966)	Hold On! (1966)

All tracks are written by George Gershwin (music), Ira Gershwin (lyrics) except where noted.

Side one
No.	Title	Writer(s)	Artist(s)	Length
1.	"When the Boys Meet the Girls"	Jack Keller, Howard Greenfield	Connie Francis	2:04
2.	"Monkey See, Monkey Do"	Johnny Farrow	Sam the Sham and The Pharaohs	2:33
3.	"Embraceable You"		Harve Presnell	2:56
4.	"Throw It Out of Your Mind"	Billy Kyle, Louis Armstrong	Louis Armstrong & Orchestra	2:10
5.	"Mail Call"	Fred Karger, Sid Wayne, Ben Weisman	Connie Francis	2:17
6.	"I Got Rhythm"		Connie Francis & Harve Presnell	3:34

Side two
No.	Title	Writer(s)	Artist(s)	Length
1.	"Listen People"	Graham Gouldman	Herman's Hermits	2:31
2.	"Bidin' My Time"		Herman's Hermits	2:26
3.	"Embraceable You"		Connie Francis	2:12
4.	"Aruba Liberace"	Liberace	Liberace	2:46
5.	"But Not for Me"		Connie Francis & Harve Presnell	2:58
6.	"I Got Rhythm"		Louis Armstrong & Orchestra	1:24

== Reception ==
Upon the film's release The New York Times reported that "If the music of the Gershwin brothers can survive a terrible little musical such as "When the Boys Meet the Girls" [...] chances are it could outlast atomic annihilation," described the film overall as "a dull, silly scramble," and described the talents of Francis and Presnell as "strictly middling" and "teamed romantically, they look like Mutt and Jeff, and their vocal wrestling with the grand Gershwin melodies is slippery at best." A contemporary review in Variety described the film as "a spotty comedy film, loaded with often extraneous tunes, also limited to some okay performances and gags," and reported that "Langdon remains the most impressive of the principals; she makes a first rate shrew." Writing for Turner Classic Movies, critic Roger Fristoe described the film as "a very loose reworking of the George and Ira Gershwin musical Girl Crazy," and noted that "the film allows for musical performances from an eclectic gathering of guest stars."

FilmInk argued the movie was "it’a variety show grab bag, indicating MGM was unsure how to pitch the film. Presnell is not convincing in the lead, and Francis sings well but lacks energy – in her defence, she doesn’t really have a character to play. The film is bright and colourful at least."

== Awards ==
In 1966, the year after the film was released, it received some prestigious awards at that year's Laurel Awards ceremony. Harve Presnell was nominated for a Golden Laurel in the category of Musical Performance, Male for his talented musical numbers. Though he did not win, he was awarded 3rd place. Connie Francis was also nominated for a Golden Laurel in the category of Musical Performance, Female for her musical numbers. She did not win either, but came in a gratifying 4th place.
