= Samuel Roger Horchow =

American entrepreneur and stage producer (1928–2020)

Samuel Roger Horchow (July 3, 1928 – May 2, 2020) was an American retailer and Broadway producer.

Horchow was born in Cincinnati, Ohio, the son of Beatrice (Schwartz) and Reuben Horchow, an attorney. In 1971, he started The Horchow Collection, the first luxury mail-order catalog that was not preceded by a brick-and-mortar presence. The first catalogs (which were called books by Roger) were photographed by The Photograpers Incorporated, in Dallas, Texas. He sold the Horchow Collection to Neiman Marcus in 1988.

In 1992, he produced his first Broadway show, Crazy for You, a George Gershwin musical, for which he won the Tony Award for Best Musical. The London version of Crazy for You won the Laurence Olivier Award for Best Musical. Though Crazy for You was inspired by an earlier Gershwin musical, Girl Crazy, which opened in 1930, theater critics and the American Theater Wing ultimately considered it to be a "new musical." Crazy for You was directed by Mike Ockrent and choreographed by Susan Stroman.

In 2000, Horchow and co-producer Roger Berlind staged a revival of Cole Porter's Kiss Me, Kate, for which he won his second Tony Award, for Best Musical Revival.

In 2007, Horchow along with other producers produced Curtains, a comedic murder mystery nominated for 8 Tony awards and 10 Drama Desk awards and in 2008 was a minor producer in the Broadway revival of Gypsy with Patti LuPone.

Horchow was a member of The Hill School Class of 1945. In 2002 he received the school's highest alumni honor, The Sixth Form Leadership Award. Horchow was awarded an honorary doctorate by his alma mater, Yale University, in 1999, and is one of the subjects of The Tipping Point (Little, Brown, 2000) 2002 edition ISBN 0-316-34662-4, an influential book by Canadian writer Malcolm Gladwell in The New Yorker.

Horchow was the author of three books, "The Art of Friendship: 70 Simple Rules for Making Meaningful Connections" (St. Martin's Press, 2006 and Neiman Marcus Exclusive, 2005) ISBN 0-312-36039-8, Elephants in Your Mailbox: How I Learned the Secrets of Mail-Order Marketing Despite Having Made 25 Horrendous Mistakes (Times Books, 1980) ISBN 0-8129-0891-0, and Living in Style: In A Time When Taste Means More Than Money (Rawson Assoc, 1981) ISBN 0-89256-166-1.

Horchow was on the Board of Selectors of Jefferson Awards for Public Service. Horchow served on the board of the Museum of Modern Art, New York, Whitney Museum, Dallas Museum of Art and Yale University Art Gallery. He was Vice-Chairman of KERA Public Radio, Dallas, TX. Dallas Theater Center, Foundation for Arts and Preservation in Embassies, Direct Relief International (Advisory Board). His wife, Carolyn Pfeifer, died in 2009.

Horchow lived in Dallas and had three daughters and five granddaughters.
