= I Got Rhythm =

1930 song by George and Ira Gershwin

Song
- Published: 1930 by New World Music
- Composer: George Gershwin
- Lyricist: Ira Gershwin

Audio sample
- Rendition of "I Got Rhythm" by Damien Riehl, recorded for Public Domain Day 2026: file; help

"I Got Rhythm" is a piece composed by George Gershwin with lyrics by Ira Gershwin and published in 1930, which became a jazz standard. Its chord progression, known as "rhythm changes", is the foundation for many other jazz tunes such as Charlie Parker's and Dizzy Gillespie's bebop standard "Anthropology (Thrivin' on a Riff)".

== Composition ==
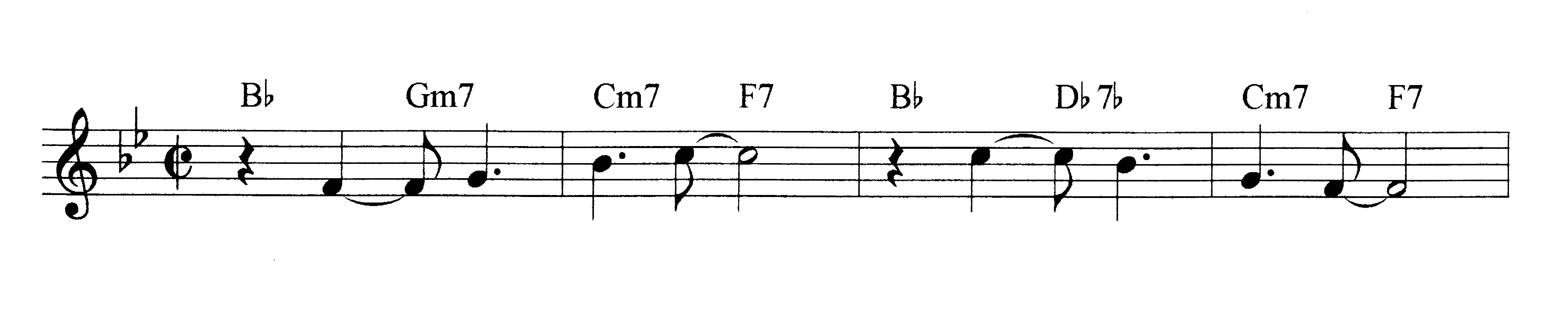
First four bars of "I Got Rhythm"

The song came from the musical Girl Crazy, which also includes two other hit songs, "Embraceable You" and "But Not for Me", and has been sung by many jazz singers since. It was originally written as a slow song for Treasure Girl (1928) and found another, faster setting in Girl Crazy. Ethel Merman sang the song in the original Broadway production and Broadway lore holds that George Gershwin, after seeing her opening reviews, warned her never to take a singing lesson. Her performance of the song made her an instant star.

The piece was originally penned in the key of D♭ major. The song melody uses four notes of the five-note pentatonic scale, first rising, then falling. A rhythmic interest in the song is that the tune keeps behind the main pulse, with the three "I got..." phrases syncopated, appearing one beat behind in the first bar, while the fourth phase "Who could..." rushes in to the song. The song's chorus is in a 34-bar AABA form. Its chord progression (although often reduced to a standard 32-bar structure for the sake of improvised solos) is known as the "rhythm changes" and is the foundation for many other popular jazz tunes. The song was used as the theme in Gershwin's last concert piece for piano and orchestra, Variations on "I Got Rhythm", written in 1934. The song has become symbolic of the Gershwins, of swing and of the 1920s.

As usual, George Gershwin wrote the melody first and gave it to Ira to set, but Ira found it an unusually hard melody for which to compose lyrics. He experimented for two weeks with the rhyme scheme he felt the music called for — sets of triple rhymes — but found that the heavy rhyming "seemed at best to give a pleasant and jingly Mother Goose quality to a tune which should throw its weight around more". Finally, he began to experiment with leaving most of the lines unrhymed. "This approach felt stronger," he wrote, "and I finally arrived at the present refrain, with only 'more-door' and 'mind him-find him' the rhymes." He added that this approach "was a bit daring for me who usually depended on rhyme insurance".

Ira also wrote that, although the phrase "Who could ask for anything more?" is repeated four times in the song, he decided not to make it the title because "somehow the first line of the refrain sounded more arresting and provocative".

=== Disputed authorship ===
The four-note opening riff bears a striking resemblance to an opening countermelody of the third movement of William Grant Still's Symphony No. 1, "Afro-American.", which was premiered in 1931, a year after "Girl Crazy" opened on Broadway. In the 1920s, Still played in the pit orchestra for Shuffle Along, and speculated that Gershwin may have borrowed the melody from his improvisations in the pit, which were later used in his own symphony.

The allegation of plagiarism was summarized by Gershwin biographer Joan Peyser in 1993:

"In 1987 Still's daughter, Judith Anne Still, wrote in a letter (to Paul Hoeffler, a Canadian photographer) that Gershwin stole the song from her father. 'I think that, to a certain extent, inspiration is "in the air" waiting to be plucked out by refined and spiritual individuals. Sorry, but Gershwin doesn't qualify as such a rare and special creature: my father said that Gershwin came to the Negro shows in Harlem to get his inspiration, stealing melodies wholesale from starving minority composers and then passing them off as his own. I Got Rhythm was my father's creation, according to Eubie Blake.'

"Reconstructing the precise chronology opens up all manner of interpretation. Gershwin's I Got Rhythm was written for Girl Crazy, which had its first public hearing on September 29, 1930, in Philadelphia's Schubert Theater. One month later, on October 30, William Grant Still, according to In One Lifetime by Verna Arvey, his widow, began composing the Afro-American Symphony, a work that contains a Scherzo movement with a "brief accompanying figure" similar to the motif of I Got Rhythm. However, in an article published in November 1969 in Music, Arvey writes that her husband was playing oboe in the pit orchestra in Shuffle Along, the breakthrough black musical of 1921, composed by Eubie Blake and Noble Sissle. Arvey writes that the players, "tired of playing the same thing over and over", improvised from time to time, and her husband's improvisation, she maintains, took the form of the particular melodic fragment that appears in Gershwin's I Got Rhythm and Still's Afro-American Symphony. The Gershwins, she believes, were undoubtedly there because the show drew celebrities from Broadway.

"This narrative has Still creating the fragment nine years before either he or Gershwin used it. But the fragment itself can hardly be said to have been "composed". It jumps right out of the fingers of the right hand of anyone playing the black notes on a piano. ...It is only when several measures present a series of pitches, harmonies, and durations that mirror the same combination of elements in a different work that a case for plagiarism can be made.

== History ==
An instrumental arrangement for piano and orchestra appears in the 1945 Hollywood Victory Caravan.

The song is featured in the 1951 musical film An American in Paris. Gene Kelly sang the song and tap-danced, while French-speaking children whom he had just taught a few words of English shouted the words "I got" each time they appeared in the lyrics. This version finished at number 32 in AFI's 100 Years...100 Songs survey of top tunes in American cinema.

The song appears in the fifth episode of the third season of Amazon Prime's streaming series The Boys. While watching the 1943 version of Girl Crazy, The Female (Karen Fukuhara) daydreams about performing "I Got Rhythm" as a Broadway-style song-and-dance number with Frenchie (Tomer Capone). Fukuhara performed her own vocals for the scene.

It is also featured in the film Mr. Holland's Opus, during a scene in which students are trying out for a Gershwin revue, and in the movie My Girl, during a dinner scene in which the grandmother sings it, oblivious of the other characters.

An extensive list of notable singers have recorded this song. The most popular versions are those of The Happenings (number 3 on the US charts in 1967), Judy Garland, Ethel Merman, Ella Fitzgerald and, more recently, Jodi Benson.

The song immediately became a jazz standard with recordings occurring already the year of publication. One of the first in jazz style is by Loring "Red" Nichols and his Orchestra on Brunswick (4957) recorded 23 October 1930. Many songs use its chord progression, such as Duke Ellington's "Cotton Tail". Charlie Parker alone based many songs on its chord progression, such as "Moose the Mooche". Gary Larson referenced the song in The Far Side.

In 1939, "I Got Rhythm" was arranged and orchestrated by Bruce Chase for a premiere performance by the Kansas Philharmonic, now the Kansas City Symphony.

A version of the song set to a disco beat was recorded by Ethel Merman for her Ethel Merman Disco Album in 1979.

In 1992, the show Crazy for You featured the song sung by Jodi Benson.

Another version of the song was arranged for solo guitar by Ton Van Bergeyk. It appears on the album Black and Tan Fantasy. Mike Oldfield and Wendy Roberts performed a version on Oldfield's Platinum album.

The song was satirized in an episode of The Muppet Show where Rowlf and Fozzie attempt to perform it but Fozzie is unable to keep in tempo. To compensate, Rowlf changes the lyrics to "I don't got rhythm."

The song has appeared in several film versions of Girl Crazy:

- Girl Crazy (1932), performed by Kitty Kelly
- Girl Crazy (1943), performed by Judy Garland and Mickey Rooney with Six Hits and a Miss, The Music Maids and Tommy Dorsey with his Orchestra
- When the Boys Meet the Girls (1965), performed by Harve Presnell and Connie Francis

This song can also be seen in one episode of Season 1 of Young Sheldon during a theatrical performance. In June 2026, CBS News included the song in its list of the 250 essential American songs of the past 250 years.

The song entered the public domain in the United States on January 1, 2026. However, the earliest sound recordings of it remain under copyright owing to the 100-year term of protection for sound recordings established by the CLASSICS Act.

== Other recordings ==
- George Gershwin – 1931
- Louis Armstrong – 1931
- Casa Loma Orchestra – 1933
- Fats Waller - 1935
- Duke Ellington
- Jimmy Dorsey and his Orchestra – 1937
- Benny Goodman – 1938
- Metronome All Stars (Count Basie, Benny Carter, Benny Goodman) – 1942
- Esquire All Stars (Louis Armstrong, Roy Eldridge, Art Tatum) – 1944
- Jazz at the Philharmonic (Coleman Hawkins, Charlie Parker, Lester Young) – 1946
- Willie "The Lion" Smith – 1949
- The Happenings – Psycle (1967)
- Bing Crosby included the song in his 1976 album At My Time of Life.
- Ethel Merman – including a disco version for The Ethel Merman Disco Album (1979)
- Mike Oldfield (with Wendy Roberts) arranged the song as a ballad - Platinum (1979)
- Stephane Grappelli and McCoy Tyner – One on One (1990)
- Thelonious Monk
- Red Nichols
- Charlie Parker
- Hiromi's Sonicbloom – Beyond Standard (2008)
- The Puppini Sisters – Hollywood (2011)
- Ethel Waters
- Tony Glausi - My Favorite Tunes (2020)

== See also ==
- List of 1930s jazz standards
- Thirty-two-bar form

== Sources ==
- Greenberg, Rodney (1998). George Gershwin. Phaidon Press. ISBN 0-7148-3504-8.
- Gershwin, George (1996). The Complete Gershwin Keyboard Works. Warner Brothers Publications. ISBN 978-1-57623-743-4.
