= Boy! What Love Has Done to Me! =

Song by George and Ira Gershwin

"Boy! What Love Has Done to Me!" is a song composed by George Gershwin, with lyrics by Ira Gershwin. It was introduced by Ethel Merman in the 1930 musical Girl Crazy. In the 1943 film version, the song was performed by Tommy Dorsey and His Orchestra.

== Notable recordings ==
- Jane Froman on Boy! What Love Has Done to Me! /Tonight We Love, Columbia 36414, 1941
- Ella Fitzgerald on Ella Fitzgerald Sings the George and Ira Gershwin Song Book (1959)
