= Ladies First (musical) =

Musical by A. Baldwin Sloane and Harry B. Smith

Ladies First is a musical in three acts with music by A. Baldwin Sloane and both book and lyrics by Harry B. Smith. It was based on Charles H. Hoyt's 1897 play A Contented Woman. Directed by Frank Smithson and produced by Harry Frazee, it premiered at Broadway's Broadhurst Theatre on October 24, 1918. In the middle of its New York run it transferred to the Nora Bayes Theatre where it closed on March 15, 1919, after 164 performances.

Ladies First was created as a starring vehicle for Nora Bayes who played the role of Betty Burt. It was originally titled Look Who's Here during tryout performances prior to its Broadway run. The musical interpolated a song by George Gershwin and Ira Gershwin under the pseudonym "Arthur Francis," "The Real American Folk Song (is a Rag)"—the first of Ira's lyrics to be performed on Broadway. (This song later opened the second act of Crazy for You.) Two other songs with George's music were used in tryouts of Look Who's Here: "Some Wonderful Sort of Someone" (lyrics by Schuyler Greene) and "Something about Love" (lyrics by Lou Paley).
