= Stacey Logan =

American actress

Stacey (Loach) Logan graduated from Oklahoma City University 1985 and has been in six Broadway shows, including Sweet Smell of Success (musical), Crazy for You, Beauty and the Beast, Hal Prince's revival of Candide, Big, and High Society. She has been seen on television in PBS's Great Performances as Polly Baker in Crazy For You filmed at the famous Paper Mill Playhouse. At CityRep in Oklahoma City, she has played Diana in Next to Normal, Barbara in August Osage County, Georgie in Heisenberg, Nora in A Doll's House Part 2, Beatrice in Much Ado About Nothing, Masha in Vanya, Sonia, Masha, and Spike, Dr. Emma Brookner in The Normal Heart, and starred as Haley in the one-woman-show, Bad Dates.
