= Rohan Browne =

Australian dancer, actor and singer

- Born: 6 August 1979 (age 46); Melbourne, Victoria, Australia
- Occupations: Dancer; actor; singer
- Spouse: Christie Whelan-Browne (m. 2012)

Rohan Browne (born 1979 or 1980) is an Australian dancer, actor and singer.

== Career ==
Browne's career started at age 18 in the original The Boy From Oz production. He went on to appear in over 20 musicals in Australia and internationally. Musicals include: Grease, "Wing" in Hot Shoe Shuffle, Kiss Me Kate (Green Room Award nomination for best featured ensemble member), Mame and Follies.

Browne played the role of "Herod" in Jesus Christ Superstar throughout Europe and Asia. He played various roles in Cats and starred as "The Rum Tum Tugger" throughout Asia.

He returned to Australia and landed the role of "Fred Casely" in Chicago and then went on to play the role of George in The Drowsy Chaperone at MTC alongside Geoffrey Rush. He was nominated for a Green Room Award for his performance. In July 2010 he starred in the national Australian tour of West Side Story as "Riff", (Green room nomination).

He has worked for Melbourne's The Production Company in nine of their shows. Roles include; "The Purser" in Anything Goes, "Carmen Ghia" in The Producers, and in leading roles of Don Lockwood in Singin' In The Rain (Green Room Award Nomination, Australian Dance Award Nomination) and Jimmy Winter in Nice Work If You Can Get It.

He appeared as a Protean in the 2012 production of A Funny Thing Happened on the Way to the Forum at Her Majesty's Theatre in Melbourne. He was "The Leading Player" in Pippin for "Magnormos". In the 2013 national tour, he played the role of "Gregory Gardner" in A Chorus Line and stepped up to play the role of "Zach" in Singapore.

In 2014, he was cast by Baz Luhrmann in Strictly Ballroom in the role of "Ken Railings" and he also understudied and performed the lead role of Scott Hastings. In 2015, he appeared in the Australian premiere of City Of Angels at the Arts Centre Melbourne.

Browne also been an ensemble member in productions of Grease, Dirty Dancing, Anything Goes, Kiss Me, Kate, Thoroughly Modern Millie, Follies, Mame and the original Boy From Oz. Brown was nominated for a Green Room Award for his role in Kiss Me Kate.

Rohan was a finalist in the International Ballet Competition in South Africa in 1997, and was a part of the Sydney Dance Company's Tivoli. He also performed as Zeus in Idomeneo for Opera Australia, and in The Nutcracker and Sleeping Beauty with National Theatre Ballet.

He has appeared in Dance Academy and Miss Fisher's Murder Mysteries". He appears in the 2016 released film The Divorce and was a featured dancer in the 2006 animated film Happy Feet.

Browne has been featured in numerous television shows including Rove Live and Top of the Pops (Germany), and in the film Happy Feet. He worked as assistant choreographer for a show which later toured the New York Musical Theatre Festival, Virgins – A Musical Threesome. He was also a part of workshops for Priscilla Queen of the Desert, and Chita Rivera's Australian workshop.

== Personal life ==
Browne is married to actor and singer Christie Whelan Browne.
