= Live at Rockland Palace =

Live album by Charlie Parker
- Released: 1997
- Recorded: September 26, 1952
- Venue: Rockland Palace, Harlem, New York City
- Genre: Jazz
- Length: 106:36
- Label: Jazz Classics

Charlie Parker chronology
Complete Charlie Parker on Dial (1996)	Live at Rockland Palace (1997)	Cool Bird (2000)

Live at Rockland Palace, also released as The Complete Legendary Rockland Palace Concert, is a live album by jazz saxophonist Charlie Parker, recorded in 1952 with strings at Rockland Palace in Harlem. The event was a benefit concert for local politician Benjamin Davis.

== History ==
A dance had been organized for Benjamin J. Davis Jr., who had been convicted during the Smith Act trials of Communist Party leaders. Charlie Parker's quintet was hired in addition to a string section; none of the string personnel have been identified. Unusually for a Parker quintet record, the second soloist of the band was a guitarist (Mundell Lowe) rather than a trumpet player.

The recordings at the dance hall were made on bootleg private tapes, and most in circulation were of poor quality prior to the restoration carried out for the 1997 release. One track, "Lester Leaps In" was recorded simultaneously by two bootleg tape recorders, and the two were brought together to create stereo sound.

== Reception ==
Professional ratings
Review scores
Source	Rating
AllMusic	4/5 stars
The Penguin Guide to Jazz	3/4 stars

Cub Koda of AllMusic wrote positively of the album, describing it as "[a]n important chapter in Parker's musical history". Tom Storer wrote, "there is Bird at the front of the proceedings, playing at all times with sheer joy and thrilling aplomb. There is no point listing high points, since there are so many."

The authors of The Penguin Guide to Jazz noted, "the general standard is high and the string settings are not too egregious."

== Track listing ==
1. "Rocker" (Gerry Mulligan) (take 1) — 3:57
2. "Moose The Mooche" (Parker) — 4:56
3. "Just Friends" (John Klenner) — 3:04
4. "My Little Suede Shoes" (Parker) — 4:10
5. "I'll Remember April" (Gene de Paul, Don Raye) — 1:15
6. "Sly Mongoose" (traditional) — 4:54
7. "Laura" (David Raksin, Johnny Mercer)— 3:01
8. "Star Eyes" (Gene de Paul, Don Raye) — 2:30
9. "This Time The Dream's On Me" (Harold Arlen, Johnny Mercer) — 6:08
10. "You'd Be So Easy to Love" (Cole Porter) — 1:54
11. "Cool Blues" (Parker) — 3:18
12. "What Is This Thing Called Love?" (Porter) — 2:07
13. "I Didn't Know What Time It Was" (Richard Rodgers, Lorenz Hart) — 2:37
14. "Repetition" (Neal Hefti) — 2:40
15. "Lester Leaps In" (Lester Young) — 3:47
16. "East of the Sun" (Brooks Bowman) — 3:10
17. "April In Paris" (Vernon Duke) — 2:51
18. "Out of Nowhere" (Johnny Green) — 2:47
19. "Rocker" (Mulligan) (take 2) — 5:18

== Personnel ==
- Charlie Parker — alto saxophone
- Mundell Lowe — guitar
- Walter Bishop Jr. — piano
- Teddy Kotick — bass
- Max Roach — drums
- Unknown — strings (tracks 1, 3, 5, 7, 10, 12–14, 16–19)
