= Girl Crazy (1943 film) =

1943 film by Norman Taurog and Busby Berkeley

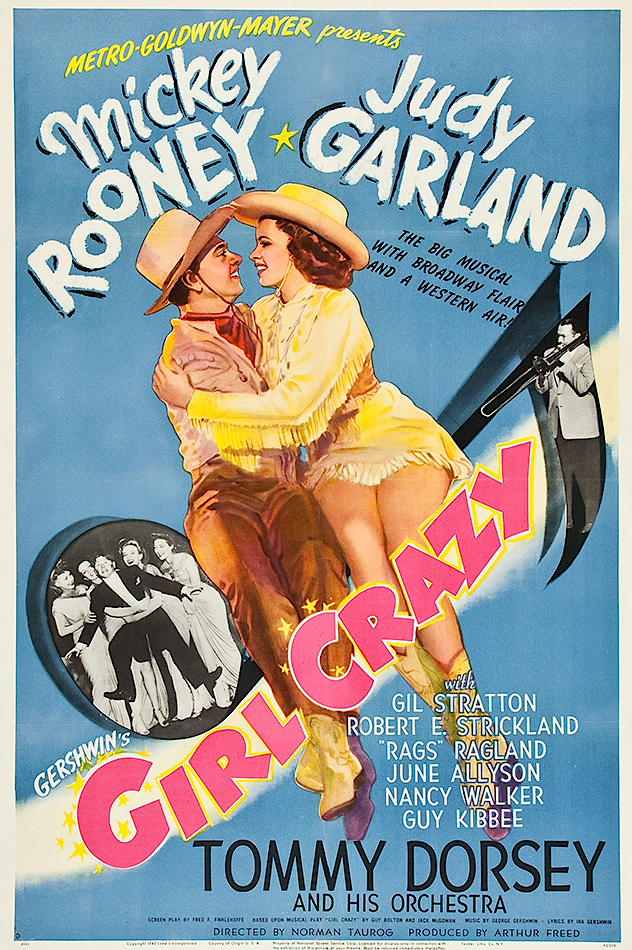
- Theatrical release poster
- Directed by: Norman Taurog; Busby Berkeley
- Screenplay by: Fred F. Finklehoffe; Dorothy Kingsley (uncredited); William Ludwig (uncredited); Sid Silvers (uncredited)
- Based on: Based on Girl Crazy; 1930 musical by Guy Bolton (book); Jack McGowan (book); George Gershwin (music); Ira Gershwin (lyrics)
- Produced by: Arthur Freed
- Starring: Mickey Rooney; Judy Garland
- Cinematography: William H. Daniels; Robert H. Planck
- Edited by: Albert Akst
- Music by: George Gershwin
- Production company: Metro-Goldwyn-Mayer
- Distributed by: Loew's Inc.
- Release date: November 26, 1943 (US)
- Running time: 97 or 99–100 minutes
- Country: United States
- Language: English
- Budget: $1,469,000
- Box office: $3,771,000

Girl Crazy is a 1943 American musical film starring Judy Garland and Mickey Rooney. Produced by the Freed Unit of Metro-Goldwyn-Mayer, it is based on the stage musical Girl Crazy – which was written by Guy Bolton and Jack McGowan, with music and lyrics by George and Ira Gershwin. It was the last of Garland and Rooney's nine movies as co-stars, the pair appearing only once more together on film, with Garland as a guest star in 1948's Words and Music in which Rooney played songwriter Lorenz Hart.

Production began with Busby Berkeley as director, but he was soon replaced by Norman Taurog. The film used six songs from the original stage musical, plus another Gershwin song, "Fascinating Rhythm".

== Plot ==
Dan Churchill, Jr., a young playboy, is a headache for his concerned tycoon father. In hopes that isolation from girls will help Junior concentrate on his studies, Churchill senior takes Danny out of Yale University and packs him off to the all-male Cody College of Mines and Agriculture somewhere deep in the saguaroed American West.

Walking endless miles from the train depot to the isolated college he meets Ginger Gray, the local postmistress and favorite of all the students. He immediately falls for her. Though he is initially not pleased with what he finds at the school, including the primitive facilities, rough-riding, and practical-joking fellow students, he eventually settles in - and resumes pitching woo at Ginger.

The couple become attracted to each other, and are devastated when they learn that the college, run by her grandfather, must close due to falling enrollment. Using his father's name, Danny wheedles his way into seeing the state governor, and extracts a one-month reprieve to boost applications and avoid a shuttering. Danny divines that an Old West show that crowns a "Queen of the Rodeo" will attract not only desired attention but that of the fairer sex.

Tommy Dorsey's band is engaged to play and the event is a success, but Danny crowns the governor's daughter Queen instead of Ginger. Applications surge, the school's future is secured, but he must win back the heart of his true love. He does, and a celebration of dance and music caps their reconciliation.

== Cast ==
- Mickey Rooney as Danny Churchill, Jr.
- Judy Garland as Ginger Gray
- Gil Stratton as Bud Livermore
- Robert E. Strickland as Henry Lathrop
- Rags Ragland as Rags
- June Allyson as specialty singer
- Nancy Walker as Polly Williams
- Guy Kibbee as Dean Phineas Armour
- Frances Rafferty as Marjorie Tait
- Henry O'Neill as Danny Churchill Sr.
- Howard Freeman as Governor Tait
- Tommy Dorsey and His Orchestra as themselves
- Irving Bacon as John, the Governor's secretary (uncredited)
- Charles Walters as specialty dancer (uncredited)

Cast notes:

- Girl Crazy was June Allyson's film debut.
- Judy Garland's part, Ginger Gray, was played in the original Broadway stage production by Ginger Rogers.

== Songs ==
All songs by George Gershwin (music) and Ira Gershwin (lyrics) except where noted

1. "Treat Me Rough" - June Allyson, Mickey Rooney and chorus with Tommy Dorsey's orchestra
2. "Bidin' My Time" - Judy Garland, The King's Men
3. "Could You Use Me?" - Mickey Rooney and Judy Garland
4. "Happy Birthday Ginger" (written by Roger Edens)
5. "Embraceable You" - Rags Ragland and chorus, Judy Garland and chorus, Charles Walters (dancer with Garland)
6. "Fascinating Rhythm" - Tommy Dorsey's orchestra
7. "But Not For Me" - Rags Ragland with vocal by Judy Garland
8. "I Got Rhythm" - Judy Garland, Mickey Rooney and chorus with Tommy Dorsey's orchestra

Choreography for the musical numbers is by Jack Donohue, with Charles Walters responsible for "Embraceable You". An additional production number, "Bronco Busters", which was sung by Garland, Rooney and Nancy Walker, was cut from the film.

The musical numbers were recorded in stereophonic sound but mixed into mono for release to theaters. Rhino Records released a compact disc featuring the original stereo recordings, which include probably the only stereo tracks of Tommy Dorsey and his orchestra.

== Production ==
Fred Astaire and Eleanor Powell were originally announced to star in the film as a follow-up to Broadway Melody of 1940.

MGM's Roger Edens – the Freed Unit's musical arranger and associate producer, and Garland's mentor – convinced Garland, who was eager to play more adult roles, that one more pairing with Rooney would be a good idea.

Production began in early January 1943 with Busby Berkeley as director. Berkeley had previously directed Rooney and Garland in Babes in Arms (1939), Strike Up the Band (1940) and Babes on Broadway (1941), their biggest hits together, but he was fired for a number of reasons. He and Edens conflicted over Berkeley's staging of I Got Rhythm, with Edens complaining later about Berkeley's "big ensembles and trick cameras [...] with people cracking whips and guns and cannons going off all over my arrangements and Judy's voice". M-G-M was also not happy with the amount of money Berkeley spent on the elaborate production number. The final straw may have been conflicts with Garland, who bridled under Berkeley's demanding style of direction. "I used to feel as if he had a big black bull whip and he was lashing me with it", she wrote. "Sometimes I used to think I couldn't live through the day". "I Got Rhythm" was to be Berkeley's only major contribution to the final film.

Norman Taurog took over for Berkeley in early February. His calmer style of direction contrasted sharply with Berkeley's. Film historian Frank N. Magill wrote that Taurog's work "reflected the beginnings of a new style in film musicals", in which the musical numbers were used for the development of the film's characters.

Girl Crazy was partly filmed on location in the desert near Palm Springs, California.

== Critical reception ==
Contemporary reviews of Girl Crazy were generally positive. In The New York Times, Theodore Strauss wrote,

the immortal Mickey [Rooney] [...] is an entertainer to his fingertips. And with Judy [Garland], who sings and acts like an earthbound angel, to temper his brashness, well, they can do almost anything they wish, and we'll like it even in spite of ourselves.

In The Nation in 1943, critic James Agee wrote,

Mickey Rooney [is] much more bearable since he quit putting his soul into his comedy—he seems now just a detached and very competent vaudeville actor [...] Miss Garland is a good strident vaudeville actor too; and has an apparent straightness and sweetness with which I sympathize. Judging by her infrequent "emotional" moments I would like very much to see her in straight dramatic roles.

== Box office ==
According to MGM records the film earned $2,608,000 in the US and Canada and $1,163,000 elsewhere resulting in a profit of $1,068,000. It was one of the top box office hits of 1943.

The film recorded admissions in France of 898,335.

== Home media ==
Girl Crazy's VHS format was first released on March 22, 1991 as part of the MGM Musicals lineup. MGM also released the laserdisc format while Warner Bros. re-released the former format in 2001.

The DVD was released as part of The Mickey Rooney & Judy Garland Collection on September 25, 2007. A fifth bonus disc includes one number ("I Got Rhythm") in stereo, although stereo tracks exist for all the film's musical numbers. MGM technicians transferred the original multi-channel optical film tracks to 1/4" audiotape when ordered to destroy all the elements in the early 1950s; these surviving tracks were released on a stereo CD in 1995.

The individual DVD and Blu-ray format were released through Warner Archive Collection on October 2, 2018 and July 28, 2020 respectively.

== Other versions ==
The 1943 film was the second adaptation of the stage musical. The earlier, also called Girl Crazy, was released by RKO in 1932, and starred Bert Wheeler, Robert Woolsey and Dorothy Lee. Another version, with Connie Francis and Herman's Hermits, was released by MGM in 1965 as When the Boys Meet the Girls.
