= Christie Whelan Browne =

Australian actress (born 1982)

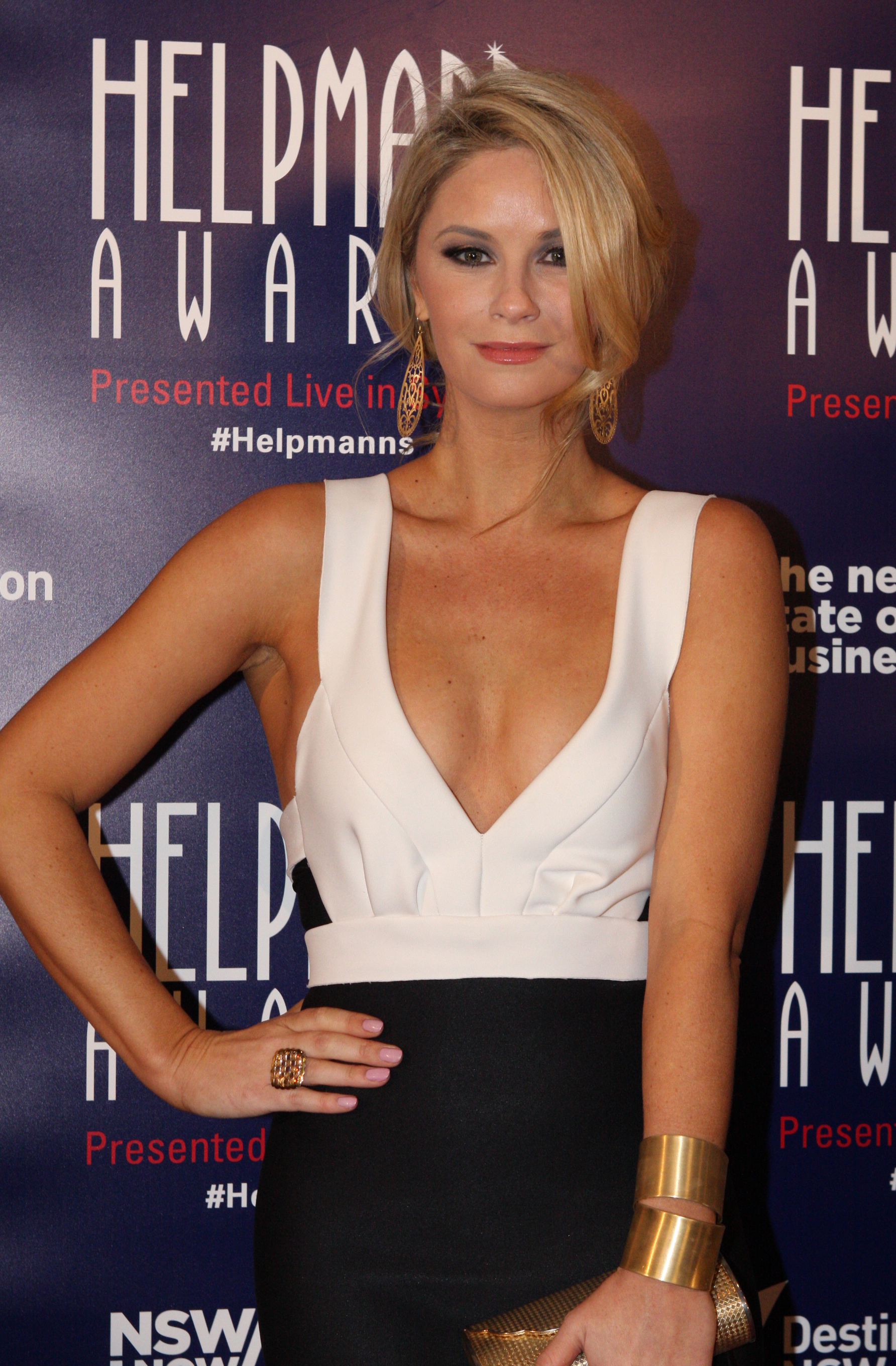
- Whelan Browne at the 2015 Helpmann Awards
- Born: Christine Whelan; 6 August 1982 (age 44); Melbourne, Victoria, Australia
- Education: St Helena Secondary College. Melbourne
- Occupation: Actress
- Years active: 2005–present
- Spouse: Rohan Browne (m. 2012)

Christine Whelan Browne (born 6 August 1982) is an Australian performer who has worked extensively in musical theatre as an actress, dancer and singer. She has also appeared on television shows and in films. In March 2012, she married fellow performer, Rohan Browne.

== Early years ==
Christie Whelan Browne was born as Christine Whelan on 6 August 1982 in Melbourne. She grew up in the suburb of Eltham, and attended St Helena Secondary College. Whelan performed in school musicals every year from Year 7. The musicals included, "The King and I and doing everything from Fiddler on the Roof to Little Shop of Horrors, as well as Grease." She later reflected on her Year 12 school production, "I was choreographing and playing a part. It was the first time I realised this was something that came naturally to me. It is the only thing that was born in me." The Whelan family were fervent basketballers.

Whelan's first amateur theatre role was in Les Misérables, followed by works with the Catchment Players and then as Roxie in Chicago. She recalled being inspired by seeing Mamma Mia!, "At the end the audience stood up and everyone was singing – I just thought this would be the best thing ever but I didn't think 'that'll be me one day'." A talent manager caught her performance in Chicago and recommend she turn professional. Whelan Browne acknowledged her teachers, "Susan Anne Walker and Rosie Harris for singing, I danced at Bev Palmer's for a couple of years when I was younger and more recently have been doing some TV and film courses around Melbourne and Sydney." In the early 2000s, she contracted glandular fever, which resulted in chronic fatigue syndrome, "I think with hindsight I hadn't found my place in the world and I didn't know what life was going to look like and actually, just as I was recovering, I was cast in Grease."

== Career ==
Whelan Browne's professional career began in 2005 in Grease: The Arena Spectacular, playing the role of Patti Simcox. She reprised the role in the United Kingdom. In both productions she understudied Sandy's role. On returning to Sydney, she portrayed April in Gale Edwards's production of Company from June to August 2007 at Theatre Royal. Due to illness, Whelan missed the 18 July performance, and with no understudy available, Peter Cousens of Kookaburra Musical Theatre decided the production would continue with "key songs, scenes and dialogue" removed. Despite criticism of Company, and Cousens, in 2008 Whelan received the Sydney Theatre Award for Best Newcomer for her role in Company.

The actress provided a one-woman performance in 'Tegrity: Britney Spears Live in Cabaret in the titular role, which began at the Adelaide Cabaret Festival (June 2009) and continued, as Britney Spears: the Cabaret, in Sydney (October 2009) and Melbourne (October 2010). The show was co-written by Mathew Frank and Dean Bryant. According to Andrew Stephens of The Sydney Morning Herald, it is "her first big hit. That's little wonder, given it is a searing and unexpectedly compassionate work." In subsequent years, Britney Spears: the Cabaret was toured around Australia annually until 2019. She played the role of Lucy in Bryant and Frank's Australian musical Once We Lived Here, in September 2009 for which she was nominated for the Green Room Award for Female Actor in a Featured Role (Music Theatre). Other credits include Maisy in The Boy Friend (2009), as well as chorus member in 42nd Street (2007) and various characters in Starting Here, Starting Now (June–July 2010). Her debut film role was a brief appearance as "Woman Runner" in the romantic comedy, I Love You Too (May 2010).

Whelan appeared in The Drowsy Chaperone (January–February 2010) for Melbourne Theatre Company (MTC) as Janet van de Graaf, for which she was a nominated for a Helpmann Award for Best Female Actor in a Musical. The lead role of Man in the Chair was portrayed by Geoffrey Rush, while Whelan's then-boyfriend Rohan Browne took the role of George. She played the title role in The Production Company's Sugar (September–October 2010), for which she was a Green Room Award nominee for Best Actress. Sugar is based on the 1959 film, Some Like It Hot, with Marilyn Monroe as Sugar "Kane" Kowalczyk. Whelan took the lead role of Clio/Kira in the musical, Xanadu (March 2011), which had her roller skating in a big top tent. She obtained the sought-after role over fellow actress/singer contenders, Natalie Bassingthwaighte, Ricki-Lee Coulter, Erika Heynatz, Margot Robbie and Holly Valance. She followed with the role of Erma in Anything Goes (July 2011).

Whelan Browne was a guest panellist on an episode of Spicks and Specks in June 2011 on ABC Television and on TV talk show, The Circle. She undertook the role of Kylie McDonald in the episode "Covert Aggression in Netball" of TV series Winners & Losers (March 2011). She appeared in Offspring Season 2, Episode 11 "Complications" (July 2011) as Jenny. Other TV credits include Leila Esperance in Miss Fisher's Murder Mysteries (March 2012) and Katarina in Conspiracy 365 (December 2012). She played Gwendolen in The Importance of Being Earnest (November 2011–January 2012) for MTC. Cameron Woodhead of The Sydney Morning Herald felt despite the presence of Rush in the production, Whelan's "piping Gwendolyn steals the show, from the subtle subversions of her flirting behind her mother's back, to the ritualised cattiness of her scene with Cecily" (portrayed by Emily Barclay).

She played Philia in the Melbourne season of A Funny Thing Happened on the Way to the Forum (October 2012) opposite Rush for which she was nominated for a Green Room Award for Best Supporting Actress. Whelan Browne starred in Eddie Perfect's updated version of Shane Warne: The Musical as Elizabeth Hurley for five shows at the Adelaide Cabaret Festival and two shows at Melbourne's Hamer Hall in June 2013. The actress portrayed Lina Lamont opposite Browne as Don Lockwood in Singin' in the Rain in August for The Production Company at the State Theatre, Melbourne. Also in that year, she hosted the Helpmann Awards alongside Perfect, held at the Sydney Opera House. On TV she had an arc of four episodes in Network Ten's drama series Wonderland as Kristen.

In 2014, Whelan Browne took the role of Janet Weiss in the 40th anniversary tour of The Rocky Horror Show. Lead actor Craig McLachlan portrayed Frank-N-Furter, reprising his role from 1992 Australian production. In 2015, she played the role of Olivia Newton-John in the TV miniseries, Peter Allen: Not the Boy Next Door on the Seven Network. The actress provided a cameo in House Husbands as an inappropriate dance teacher. She starred in another one-woman show Pure Blonde, written by Bryant and Frank, which played at the 2015 Adelaide Cabaret Festival. Her portrayal of Eileen Evergreen in The Production Company's Nice Work If You Can Get It (August 2015) was described by Katie Purvis of AussieTheatre.com as displaying, "considerable comic chops."

Whelan Browne appeared in the first season of The Wrong Girl (September–November 2016) as Nikkii Steadman for Network 10. She portrayed Sacha in another romantic comedy film, Spin Out (September 2016); alongside Lincoln Lewis. Greg King's review of Spin Out determined, "[Whelan Browne and Lewis] are wasted in thankless roles as a couple of city slickers who rock up to the ute muster looking for a bit of excitement, and find themselves bemused by some of the bizarre rituals at play here. But their characters mainly exist to draw some humour out of the old city versus country rivalry." She portrayed one of the Pigeon sisters in MTC's production of The Odd Couple. from November 2016, and as Billie Dawn in its 2017 production of Born Yesterday. In 2018, she played Olivia in Simon Phillips' production of Shakespeare's Twelfth Night at the MTC. In both 2020 and 2021 she played Rosalind in As You Like It at the MTC with Phillips directing. In 2018, Whelan Browne appeared as herself in the comedy film That's Not My Dog!. Whelan Browne joined the cast of Neighbours as Scarlett Brady in June 2019, which was broadcast in September. She reprised the role the following year. The actress joined the ensemble cast of the comedy news television program Shaun Micallef's Mad as Hell from 2019 to its last season in 2022, appearing as more than 130 sketch characters. She also appeared in the 2020 web series Loving Captivity.

In 2023, Whelan Browne participated in the twentieth series of Dancing with the Stars, paired with Craig Monley.

In 2026 she played both lead roles, the fading Margo Channing and the upstart Eve Harrington, in Ivo van Hove's stage adaptation of the 1950 film All About Eve for the Melbourne Malthouse Theatre. In March 2027, Wheelan Browne played Sal Kerrigan in Working Dog's stage adaptation of their 1997 film The Castle at Her Majesty's Theatre, Melbourne.

== Personal life ==
Whelan and her then-boyfriend Rohan Browne first appeared on stage together in The Drowsy Chaperone from January 2010. In March 2012, Whelan and Browne married and she changed her surname to Whelan Browne. In July of that year they performed together at The Production Company's The Producers, in which she played Ulla opposite Browne's Carmen Ghia. The couple have a child.

In January 2018, Whelan Browne, Erika Heynatz and Angela Scundi made allegations of indecent assault by Craig McLachlan during the 2014 production of The Rocky Horror Show. At the end of the subsequent criminal trial, in December 2020, McLachlan was found not guilty of all charges. McLachlan had filed defamation suits against Whelan Browne and the reporting media (Australian Broadcasting Corporation and Fairfax Media) in February 2018. However, the trial for these suits was postponed pending the related criminal trial, in October 2021 the presiding judge announced the defamation trial was expected in April 2022 or later. In May 2022, McLachlan dropped the suit. In September 2023 Whelan Browne sued Oldfield Entertainment, the company that employed her on The Rocky Horror Show, claiming she was sexually harassed and sexually discriminated against. She settled that suit for an undisclosed amount in 2024.

== Filmography ==
Title	Year	Role	Notes	Ref.
I Love You Too	2010	Woman Runner	Debut film role	
Winners & Losers	2011	Kylie McDonald	Season 1, episode 1: "Covert Aggression in Netball"	
Offspring	2011	Jenny	Season 2, episode 11: "Complications"	
Miss Fisher's Murder Mysteries	2012	Leila Esperance	Season 1, episode 6: "Ruddy Gore"	
Conspiracy 365	2012	Katarina	Three episodes: "February", "June", "December"	
Paper Giants: Magazine Wars	2013	Tracy	TV miniseries	
INXS: Never Tear Us Apart	2014	Shelley Blanks	TV miniseries	
Peter Allen: Not the Boy Next Door	2015	Olivia Newton-John	TV miniseries	
House Husbands	2015	Miss Karley	Series 4, episode 4	
The Wrong Girl	2016	Nikkii Steadman	Season 1, 8 episodes	
Spin Out	2016	Sacha		
That's Not My Dog!	2018	Herself		
Neighbours	2019–2020	Scarlett Brady	36 episodes	
Shaun Micallef's Mad as Hell	2019–2022	>130 characters	50 episodes	
Loving Captivity	2020	Ally	Web series	
Spreadsheet	2021	Nancy	5 episodes	
Colin from Accounts	2022	Belinda	1 episode	

== Theatre roles ==
Title	Year	Role	Notes	Ref.
Grease: The Arena Spectacular	2005	Patty Simcox	Debut role	
Company	2007	April	Sydney Theatre Award for Best Newcomer	
42nd Street	2007	Chorus member		
'Tegrity: Britney Spears Live in Cabaret	2009	Britney Spears	One-woman show	
The Boy Friend	2009	Maisie		
Once We Lived Here	2009	Lucy	World premiere	
Light the Night	2009	Soloist		
Starting Here, Starting Now	2010	Various characters		
The Drowsy Chaperone	2010	Janet van de Graaf	Helpmann Award for Best Female Actor in a Musical nominee	
Hats Off 2010	2010	The Divine Sisters	Benefit concert	
Sugar	2010	Sugar Kane		
OzMade Musicals 2010	2010	Actor		
Xanadu	2011	Clio/Kira	Roller skating in a big top tent	
Anything Goes	2011	Erma		
The Importance of Being Earnest	2011	Gwendolen		
The Producers	2012	Ulla		
A Funny Thing Happened on the Way to the Forum	2012	Philia		
Shane Warne: The Musical	2013	Elizabeth Hurley	New role for updated version	
Singin' in the Rain	2013	Lina Lamont		
The Rocky Horror Show	2014	Janet Weiss	40th anniversary tour	
Pure Blonde	2015	various characters	One-woman show	
Nice Work If You Can Get It	2015	Eileen Evergreen		
Jerry's Girls	2015	Herself		
The Beast	2016	Gen		
The Odd Couple	2016	Pigeon sister		
Born Yesterday	2017	Billie Dawn		
Vigil	2017	Herself		
Muriel's Wedding the Musical	2017	Tania Degano		
An Ideal Husband	2018	Mrs Cheveley		
Twelfth Night	2018	Olivia		
Muriel's Wedding the Musical	2019	Tania Degano		
As You Like It	2020 and 2021	Rosalind		
All About Eve	2026	Margo Channing and Eve Harrington	Ivo van Hove's adaptation of the 1950 film All About Eve	
The Castle	2027	Sal Kerrigan	stage adaptation of the 1997 film The Castle	
