= The Real American Folk Song (is a Rag) =

1918 song by George and Ira Gershwin

Song by Ella Fitzgerald

from the album Ella Fitzgerald Sings the George and Ira Gershwin Song Book
- Written: 1918
- Published: June 1958
- Released: 1959
- Recorded: July 18, 1959
- Studio: Capitol Studio A (Hollywood)
- Genre: Ragtime
- Length: 3:43
- Label: Verve
- Composer: George Gershwin
- Lyricist: Ira Gershwin
- Producer: Norman Granz

"The Real American Folk Song (is a Rag)" is a 1918 song composed by George Gershwin, with lyrics by Ira Gershwin.

It was the first song by the Gershwin brothers to be performed on Broadway, where it was introduced by Nora Bayes in the 1918 musical Ladies First. The song was first published in June 1958, although the copyright date on the publication (Gershwin Publishing Corporation, Plate 118–5) is 1959. In 1992, it was included at the beginning of the second act of Crazy for You.

== Notable recordings ==
- Ella Fitzgerald - Ella Fitzgerald Sings the George and Ira Gershwin Songbook (1959) (first recording)
