= Cool Bird =

Compilation album by Charlie Parker
- Released: 2000
- Recorded: October–December 1947
- Genre: Jazz

Charlie Parker chronology
Live at Rockland Palace (1997)	Cool Bird (2000)

Cool Bird is a compilation album released by Magnum Collectors of recording sessions undertaken during October–December 1947 by Charlie Parker's 'classic quintet' for the Dial label featuring Parker, Miles Davis, Duke Jordan, Tommy Potter and Max Roach. They are joined by J. J. Johnson on six of the 22 tracks.

== Track listing ==
1. "Dexterity" (C. Parker)
2. "Bongo Bop"
3. "Dewey Square"
4. "The Hymn (Superman)"
5. "Bird of Paradise"
6. "Embraceable You" (G. Gershwin & I. Gershwin)
7. "Bird Feathers"
8. "Klact-Oveeseds-Tene"
9. "Scrapple from the Apple" (C. Parker)
10. "My Old Flame"
11. "Out Of Nowhere"
12. "Don't Blame Me"
13. "Drifting on a Reed"
14. "Quasimodo"
15. "Charlie's Wig"
16. "Bongo Beep"
17. "Crazeology"
18. "How Deep Is the Ocean" (I. Berlin)
19. "Another Hair Do"
20. "Blue Bird"
21. "Klaunstance"
22. "Bird Gets the Worm" (C. Parker)

== Personnel ==
- Charlie Parker - (alto sax)
- Miles Davis (trumpet)
- Duke Jordan (piano)
- Tommy Potter (double bass)
- Max Roach (drums)
- J. J. Johnson (trombone) - appears on tracks 13–18
