= Loving Captivity =

- Genre: romantic comedy
- Created by: Libby Butler; Lewis Mulholland
- Written by: Libby Butler; Lewis Mulholland
- Directed by: Libby Butler
- Starring: Christie Whelan Browne; Lewis Mulholland
- Country of origin: Australia
- Original language: English
- No. of seasons: 1
- No. of episodes: 6

Production
- Producers: Lewis Mulholland; Libby Butler; Scarlett Koehne
- Camera setup: Single-camera
- Production companies: Heroine Productions; Nicey Pole Films

Original release
- Network: Facebook
- Release: 2020

Loving Captivity is a 2020 Australian webseries written and created by Libby Butler and Lewis Mulholland.

== Premise ==
Ally, a 30-something single mum, agrees to isolate with Joe – who dated and dumped her before the pandemic.

== Cast ==
- Christie Whelan Browne as Ally
- Lewis Mulholland as Joe
- Lyra Green as Ally's daughter

== Production ==
The series was created by writers Libby Butler and Lewis Mulholland who met in 2019 an event put on by the Australian Writers' Guild with the aim of pairing writers and directors. They bonded over a shared love of romantic comedies and decided to collaborate on a series. It was based on their personal experiences. "I was dumped on Wednesday, March 18," Butler says. "By Saturday, March 21 Lewis and I had started writing."

Libby Butler said the show was "our love letter to the pandemic. As a mum slash writer, the lockdown wasn’t so different to my normal life; I work at home and can’t go out hunting the next love of my life at night because of a sleeping six-year-old. It was liberating to write about my dating experiences – and limitations – in the context of COVID-19."

The series was shot in the creators’ homes. Production finance came in part from a City of Melbourne COVID-19 arts grant. Some post production finance came from Screen Australia.

== Reception ==
The Guardian said "The one constant delight of the series is the direction and cinematography. So many film-makers still struggle with depicting digital communication... But Butler, in her directorial debut, does a great job."

The Conversation said "Both actors have comedy experience and the pacing and delivery is natural and unforced, a testament to human versatility in the face of compulsory computer-mediated communication. "
