= Girl Crazy =

1930 musical by George and Ira Gershwin

- Original Broadway programme from 1931
- Music: George Gershwin
- Lyrics: Ira Gershwin
- Book: Guy Bolton; John McGowan
- Productions: 1930 Broadway; 1932 film 1943 film

Girl Crazy is a 1930 musical by George Gershwin with lyrics by Ira Gershwin and book by Guy Bolton and John McGowan. Co-leads Ginger Rogers and Ethel Merman made their stage debuts in the first production and Rogers became an overnight star.

Rich in song, it follows the story of spoiled rich boy Danny Churchill, who has been sent to fictional Custerville, Arizona, to manage his family's ranch. His father wants him there to focus on matters more serious than alcohol and women but Danny turns the place into a dude ranch, importing showgirls from Broadway and hiring Kate Forthergill (Merman's role) as entertainer. Visitors come from both coasts and Danny falls in love with the local postmistress, Molly Gray (Rogers' role).

Three subsequent film adaptations adjusted the plot. The most notable, Girl Crazy (1943 film), starred Mickey Rooney and Judy Garland, with the latter playing a combined Kate and Molly.

== Productions ==
The musical opened at the Alvin Theatre on October 14, 1930, and closed on June 6, 1931, after 272 performances. It was directed by Alexander Leftwich, with choreography by George Hale and sets by Donald Oenslager. This musical made a star of Ginger Rogers, who, with Allen Kearns, sang "Could You Use Me?" and "Embraceable You" and, with Willie Howard, "But Not for Me". Ethel Merman, in her Broadway debut sang "I Got Rhythm", "Sam and Delilah", and "Boy! What Love Has Done To Me!" and "became an overnight sensation...that launched her fifty year career." Also of note is the opening night pit orchestra, which was composed of many well-known jazz musicians, including Benny Goodman, Gene Krupa, Glenn Miller and Jimmy Dorsey.

"The score was one of the Gershwins' best" according to theatre writer Ken Bloom.

A version with a heavily revised book was presented in 1975 by the St. Louis Municipal Opera Theatre and in 1979 by the Coachlight Dinner Theater in East Windsor, Connecticut.

In 1992 the show appeared on Broadway in a heavily revised version. It was given a new title, Crazy for You, and a completely new plot, and interpolated with material from other Gershwin stage shows and films, specifically songs written for the Fred Astaire movies of the 1930s such as "Nice Work If You Can Get It" from A Damsel in Distress and "They Can't Take That Away From Me" from Shall We Dance.

"Musicals Tonight!", New York City, presented a staged concert in September 2001.

An abridged version of Girl Crazy was presented at the Kennedy Center in Washington, DC October 2–5, 2008 as part of their Broadway: Three Generations production. Max von Essen played Danny, Jenn Colella played Molly, and Randy Graff played Kate, directed by Lonny Price.

The New York City Center Encores! staged concert was held in November 2009. Directed by Jerry Zaks, it starred Ana Gasteyer, Marc Kudisch, Becki Newton, and Wayne Knight.

The two-time Olympic champion and Emmy-winning television commentator Dick Button starred as Danny in a 1958 production, which also co-starred Jane Connell as Kate and Gordon Connell as Pete; it interpolated Gershwin's "They All Laughed" and "Nice Work If You can Get It" into the score.

== Songs (per 1954 published score from Harms, Inc. – New World Music Corp.) ==
Act I

- Overture
- 1. Opening Number, Scene I: "The Lonesome Cowboy Won't Be Lonesome Now!" — The Foursome & Cowboys
- 2. Incidental (Entrance of Molly)
- 3. "Bidin' My Time" — The Foursome
- 4. "Could You Use Me" (with dance) — Danny & Molly
- 5. "Bidin' My Time" (reprise) — The Foursome
- 6. Opening Number, Scene II: "Bronco Busters" (with dance & lariat specialty) — Bronco Busters; Dudeens & Cowboys
- 7. Change of Scene ("Bronco Busters")
- 8. "Barbary Coast" (with specialty dance and encore) — Patsy, Tess & Ensemble; Specialty Dance by Flora & Girls
- 9. "Embraceable You" (with dance and encore) — Danny & Molly
- 10. Finaletto: "Goldfarb, That's I'm!" — Gieber, Slick & Chorus
- 11. "Bidin' My Time" (reprise) — The Foursome
- 12. Incidental: Change of Scene ("Goldfarb")
- 13. "Embraceable You" (Reprise) — Danny & Molly
- 14. "Sam and Delilah" — Frisco Kate & Ensemble
- 15. "I Got Rhythm" (with dance, quartet vocal, eccentric dance and encore) — Kate, The Foursome & Specialty Dancers
- 16. Finale I: "Bronco Busters" (reprise), "Embraceable You" (reprise), Melodrama, and "Sam and Delilah" (reprise) — Danny, Kate & Ensemble

Act II

- 17. Entr'Acte (Cornet Specialty) — A Singer
- 18A. Opening Number, Scene I: "Land of the Gay Caballero" — Chorus & Specialty Dancers
- 18B. Solo Dance Specialty ("Gay Caballero") — Flora
- 19. "But Not For Me" — Molly & Gieber
- 20. "Treat Me Rough" (with dance) — Slick & Girls; Dance by Flora, Girls and Cowboys
- 21. "Boy! What Love Has Done to Me!" (with dance finish and encore) — Kate
- 22. Incidental: Torch Song ("Boy! What Love Has Done to Me!")
- 23. For Change of Scene II ("Boy! What Love Has Done to Me!")
- 24A. Following Blackout ("Lonesome Cowboy")
- 24B. "When It's Cactus Time in Arizona" (with Ukulele & Guitar specialty dance; then girls rope number to "Treat Me Rough") — Molly & Boys
- 25. Finale II: "Embraceable You" (reprise) and "I Got Rhythm" (reprise) — Entire Company

== Original cast ==
- Willie Howard as Gieber Goldfarb
- Allen Kearns as Danny Churchill
- Ginger Rogers as Molly Gray
- William Kent as Slick Fothergill
- Ethel Merman as Frisco Kate Fothergill
- Eunice Healy as Flora James
- Olive Brady as Tess Parker
- Peggy O'Connor as Patsy West
- Clyde Veaux as Pete
- Carlton Macy as Lank Sanders
- Ray Johnson, Del Porter, Marshall Smith and Dwight Snyder as The Foursome

The pit orchestra included "Red" Nichols, Glenn Miller, Gene Krupa, Tommy Dorsey, Benny Goodman and Jack Teagarden. Roger Edens was the onstage pianist for Ethel Merman. It was conducted on opening night by George Gershwin himself. The 1953 biopic The Glenn Miller Story recreated the "I'm Biding My Time" scene, with Miller (Stewart) playing trombone in the orchestra.

== Reception ==
It was said by one critic to be "fresh, ingenious...a rich delight".

The Brooklyn Standard Union was highly pleased: "one of the most pleasant nights I have spent in any theatre….George Gershwin has given it one of his finest scores. It is a possessor of a cast that furnishes 200 cents of entertainment value for every dollar, and it has a beauteous, talented, hard-working, peppy chorus….the standout attraction is…Ethel Merman….Willie Howard has never been better….Ginger Rogers is pert and pretty as ever as the leading woman. Allen Kearns does well enough as the leading man but shouldn't try to sing….The remainder of the cast is uniformly good….Red Nichols has the best band of the year in the pit."

The New York Sun commented that "Before the first act was half over, this musical comedy was established as a hit….'Girl Crazy' is a 1930 pattern of a musical comedy success."

The New York Evening Post found the production to be "one of the best shows [Aarons and Freedley]--or anybody else for that matter--have put on in what seems like a long, long time….Add to this promising beginning one of the best musical scores George Gershwin has ever turned out, garnished with graceful lyrics by Brother Ira; some fetching comedy, excellent dancing, a competent cast of performers, tasteful production--and you have an uncommonly pleasant musical play."

The Brooklyn Daily Eagle, too, was complimentary: "It has everything that all good musical comedies should have and quite a number of things many of them have not, including notably Willie Howard chanting at top speed, Ethel Merman chanting her haunting melodies to Al Siegel's inimitable piano accompaniment, and 36 chorus ladies looking and dancing exceptionally well under Georgie Hale's tutelage."

== Film adaptations ==
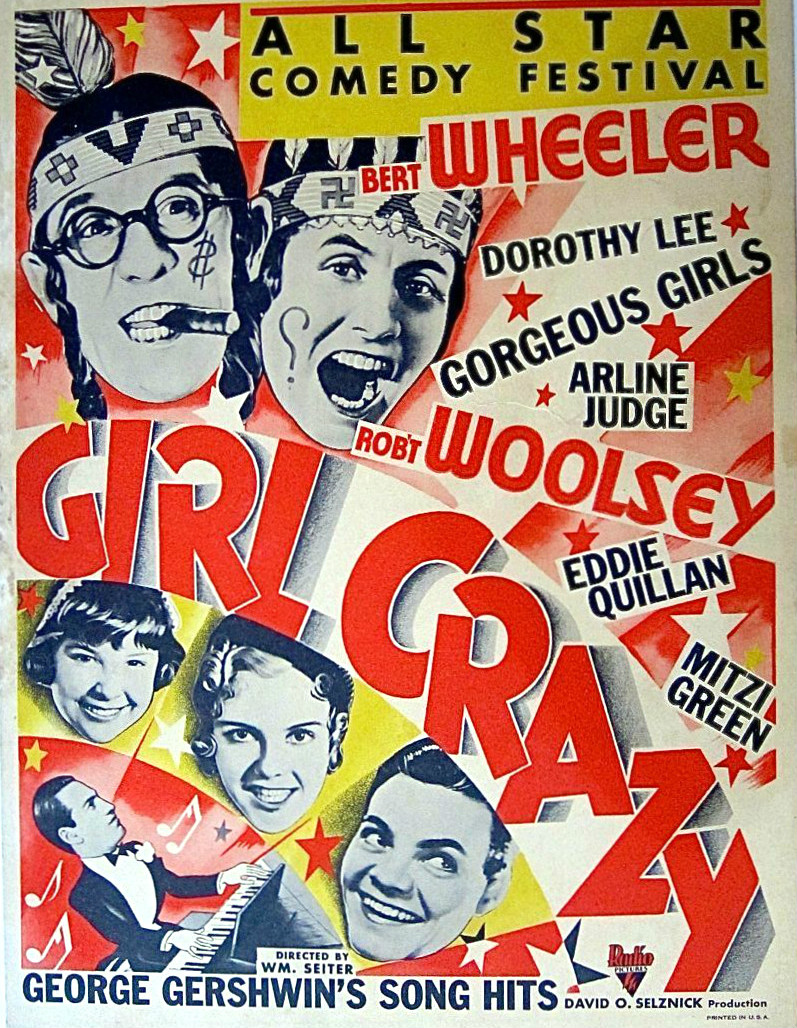
Poster for Girl Crazy (1932)

The 1932 RKO Radio Pictures production was very unlike the stage play except for its score. The film was tailored for the comic talents of Wheeler & Woolsey, a then-popular comedy team. In 1943, Metro-Goldwyn-Mayer produced a lavish version starring Mickey Rooney and Judy Garland. In 1965, MGM once again made the musical into a film, for Connie Francis. Unlike the previous two versions, the title was changed to When the Boys Meet the Girls. It co-starred Herman's Hermits, Sam the Sham and the Pharaohs, Louis Armstrong, and Liberace. A number of Gershwin songs were retained, including "Embraceable You", "Bidin' My Time", "But Not for Me", "Treat Me Rough", and "I Got Rhythm".

== Recordings ==
No original cast recording was ever made, as original cast recordings did not exist in the U.S. prior to 1943. Several studio recordings of the score have been released, including an early 1950s version with Mary Martin, but the only one using the full score and original 1930 orchestrations was released by Nonesuch Records (Nonesuch 9 79250–2) in 1990 with Lorna Luft (Kate), Frank Gorshin (Gieber Goldfarb), David Carroll (Danny), and Judy Blazer (Molly).
