= Treat Me Rough =

Song by William Kent

from the album Girl Crazy
- Published: 1930
- Genre: Traditional pop
- Songwriters: George Gershwin; Ira Gershwin

"Treat Me Rough" is a song composed by George Gershwin, with lyrics by Ira Gershwin. It was introduced by William Kent in the 1930 musical Girl Crazy. It was later sung by June Allyson in the 1943 film version.

As Larry Starr wrote in his 2010 book on Gershwin, "'Treat Me Rough,' essentially a throwaway comic number that in another composer's hands might have called forth a minimal effort, becomes through Gershwin's artistry a celebration of aggressive rhythmic virtuosity.". The song's lyrics ask a lover to dominate the singer, even to the point of violence ("Keep on beatin' me"); writer Dan Dietz referred to it as "perhaps the first musical comedy ode to masochism."

== Notable recordings ==
- Ella Fitzgerald - Ella Fitzgerald Sings the George and Ira Gershwin Songbook (1959)
