= Embraceable You =

1930 song by George and Ira Gershwin

Song by Ginger Rogers
- Written: 1928
- Published: 1930 by Harms Inc.
- Composer: George Gershwin
- Lyricist: Ira Gershwin

Cover of Embraceable You on tenor saxophone by Jules Grandgagnage

"Embraceable You" is a jazz standard song with music by George Gershwin and lyrics by Ira Gershwin. The song was written in 1928 for an unpublished operetta named East Is West. It was published in 1930 and included in that year's Broadway musical Girl Crazy, performed by Ginger Rogers in a song and dance routine choreographed by Fred Astaire.

Billie Holiday's 1944 recording was inducted into the Grammy Hall of Fame in 2005. In June 2026, CBS News included the song in its list of the 250 essential American songs of the past 250 years.

== Other versions ==
- Irene Cara in City Heat
- Nat King Cole – (1943)
- Bing Crosby (recorded November 12, 1947) – included in the album Bing Crosby Sings Songs by George Gershwin.
- Ella Fitzgerald – Ella Fitzgerald Sings the George and Ira Gershwin Songbook (1959)
- Jane Froman – With a Song in My Heart
- Judy Garland – Girl Crazy, film (1943)
- Frank Sinatra – 1944 for Columbia, 1960 for Capitol on Nice 'n' Easy
- Erroll Garner
- Herbie Hancock – Gershwin's World (1998)
- Billie Holiday – 1944
- Billie Holiday – Body and Soul (1957)
- Chet Baker – Embraceable You (album) (1957)
- Charlie Parker – Cool Bird (1947)
- Hazel Scott – 1942
- Idina Menzel – 2010
- Ornette Coleman – This Is Our Music (1961)
- Harve Presnell – When the Boys Meet the Girls (1965)
- Martin Taylor – Love Songs (2019)
- Brent Spiner – Ol' Yellow Eyes Is Back (1991)
- Joe Lovano – 52nd Street Themes (2000)
- Geri Allen – Timeless Portraits and Dreams (2006)
- Johnny Mathis – Open Fire, Two Guitars (1959)
- Cliff Richard – Cliff Sings (1959)

== See also ==
- List of 1930s jazz standards
