= But Not for Me (song) =

Song by George and Ira Gershwin

Song
- Published: 1930 by New World Music
- Songwriters: George Gershwin and Ira Gershwin

"But Not for Me" is a popular song originally written by George Gershwin and Ira Gershwin for the musical Girl Crazy (1930), where it was introduced by Ginger Rogers in her Broadway debut.

Ella Fitzgerald's 1959 version of "But Not for Me," which appeared on Ella Fitzgerald Sings the George and Ira Gershwin Songbook, won the 1960 Grammy Award for Best Female Vocal Performance.

The song is recognized as a Jazz standard.

Singer Ketty Lester remade "But Not for Me" with a gospel arrangement. The song reached No. 10 on the US Adult Contemporary chart, No. 41 on the Billboard Top 40, and No. 45 in the UK in 1962.

The composition entered the American public domain on January 1, 2026.

== Other recordings ==
- Harry James with Helen Forrest – recorded for Columbia on December 30, 1941 and reached No. 12 in the Billboard charts in 1942.
- Bing Crosby – recorded both in 1942 and 1954 for his radio show. It was included in the box set The Bing Crosby CBS Radio Recordings (1954–56) issued by Mosaic in 2009.
- Judy Garland – for the 1943 film Girl Crazy.
- Miles Davis – Bags' Groove (1954).
- Chet Baker – Chet Baker Sings (1954).
- Doris Day on Day by Day (1956).
- Buddy De Franco on Mr. Clarinet (1956).
- Modern Jazz Quartet – Django (1956).
- Kenny Burrell – Introducing Kenny Burrell (1956).
- Red Garland – Red Garland's Piano (1956).
- Polly Bergen – on The Polly Bergen Show (1957).
- Ahmad Jamal – At the Pershing: But Not for Me (1958).
- Anita O'Day – Anita O'Day at Mister Kelly's (1958)
- Ella Fitzgerald – Ella Fitzgerald Sings the George and Ira Gershwin Songbook (1959).
- The Flamingos – Flamingo Serenade (1959).
- Diahann Carroll - The Magic of Diahann Carroll (with the André Previn Trio) (1960)
- John Coltrane – My Favorite Things (1961).
- Sam Cooke – My Kind of Blues (1961).
- Dexter Gordon – Take the A Train (1967).
- Frank Sinatra – Trilogy: Past Present Future (1980)
- Linda Ronstadt – For Sentimental Reasons (Linda Ronstadt album) (1986).
- Harry Connick Jr. – for the 1989 film and subsequent soundtrack When Harry Met Sally.
- Elton John – in 1993 for the 1994 film Four Weddings and a Funeral.
- Elvis Costello - 1994 recording for the album The Glory of Gershwin, tribute album by various singers and performers in celebration of American musician Larry Adler's 80th birthday.
- Olivier Caillard and Hélène Bohy – C'est pas pour moi (French version) in Les P'tits Loups du Jazz (1993).
- Timothy Levitch – The Cruise (1998) The film starts with Levitch singing the song a cappella.
- Rod Stewart – Stardust: The Great American Songbook, Volume III (2004)
- James Moody with Kenny Barron – Moody 48 (2008).
- Barry Manilow – Night Songs (Barry Manilow album) (2014)
- Diana Krall – Love Is Here to Stay (2018). Krall talks about and performs the song while interviewed by Elton John on Spectacle: Elvis Costello with...
- Esperanza Spalding and Fred Hersch - Alive at the Village Vanguard (2023)
- grentperez - Chet Baker Re:imagined (2025)

== See also ==
- List of 1930s jazz standards
