= That's What Life Is All About (album) =

That’s What Life Is All About

Studio album by Bing Crosby
- Released: August 29, 1975
- Recorded: October 17, 1974, February, 1975
- Genres: Vocal, Jazz
- Length: 42:01
- Label: United Artists (UAG-29730)
- Producer: Ken Barnes

Bing Crosby chronology
A Southern Memoir (1975)	That’s What Life Is All About (1975)	A Couple of Song and Dance Men (w/ Fred Astaire) (1975)

Professional ratings
Review scores
Source	Rating
Allmusic	3/5 stars

That's What Life Is All About is the thirty-ninth solo studio album by American singer and actor Bing Crosby for United Artists at Chappells in London in February 1975. He was accompanied by Pete Moore and his Orchestra.

The songs from the album were included on a 3-CD set called Bing Crosby: The Complete United Artists Sessions issued by EMI Records (7243 59808 2 4) in 1997. This included several previously unreleased alternate takes and studio chat.

== Background ==
In January 1974, Crosby was seriously ill and after two weeks of tests, he underwent three and a half hours of major surgery. Two-fifths of his left lung and an abscess the size of a small orange were removed. The tumor was a rare fungus called nocardia. There were concerns initially that he would not be able to sing again and his recuperation took many months. Record producer Ken Barnes later heard that Crosby was thinking of recording again and he quickly presented his credentials and eventually met Crosby on September 9, 1974, at the singer's home. Arrangements were soon made for two albums to be made in London. As a prelude, two songs were recorded with Johnny Mercer and a rhythm section at Mercer's own “Heritage” recording studio at Oak Street in Burbank, California on October 17, 1974. Orchestra was added in February 1975.

Crosby flew to London on February 18 and that afternoon visited the Chappells recording studio. He was shown the vocal booth where he would be singing but said that he did not want to work in that way. He wanted to be with the band and said, “I didn’t come seven thousand miles to sing to a pane of glass.” This worried sound engineer John Timperley who was concerned about separation problems because of the large orchestra which was to be used. Crosby was adamant however and, in the event, he successfully overcame the problems of recording in front of a full orchestra.

Over a period of eight days, Crosby, in six sessions, recorded twenty five tracks. Eleven of the tracks, plus the two Crosby had recorded with Johnny Mercer were issued on this LP. Thirteen, with the addition of another song to be recorded in 1976, were issued on an LP called At My Time of Life and the final recording was included with eleven others made in 1976 and issued on an LP called Beautiful Memories.

== Personnel ==
Rhythm section - October 17, 1974: Jimmy Rowles (piano); Joe Mondragon (bass) and Alvin Stoller (drums).
Full details are not given for the recordings in February 1975 but the 3-CD set Bing Crosby: The Complete United Artists Sessions mentions the following:

"The Best Things in Life Are Free" - Kenny Baker, muted trumpet

"Have a Nice Day" - Tommy Reilly, harmonica

== Reception ==
The album entered the UK album charts on September 20, 1975, and peaked at No. 28 during its 6 weeks in the charts.

The UK magazine The Gramophone reviewed the album saying:

"...Crosby’s voice has lost very little power and presence despite his septuagenarian status and the major lung operation he underwent last year, and, estimably aided by the outstanding arrangements of Pete Moore and the first-class orchestra directed by Moore, this album is another landmark in a uniquely long and distinguished career.”

Variety commented: “All right, Bing Crosby's voice isn’t as great as it was 20, 30 or whatever years ago. So what? He’s a brilliant stylist and there’s plenty of voice left as he demonstrates here on 13 tracks…”

== Track listing ==
Side one
No.	Title	Writer(s)	Length
1.	"That's What Life Is All About"	Les Reed, Peter Dacre, Ken Barnes, Bing Crosby	3:28
2.	"Breezin' Along with the Breeze"	Richard Whiting, Haven Gillespie, Seymour Simons	2:58
3.	"No Time at All"	Stephen Schwartz	3:52
4.	"I Love to Dance Like They Used to Dance"	Billy Goldenberg, Alan and Marilyn Bergman	3:00
5.	"Have a Nice Day"	Hoyt Axton	3:22
6.	"The Pleasure of Your Company" / "Roamin' in the Gloamin'" (with Johnny Mercer)	André Previn, Johnny Mercer, Harry Lauder	4:08

Side two
No.	Title	Writer(s)	Length
7.	"The Best Things in Life Are Free"	Buddy DeSylva, Lew Brown, Ray Henderson	2:26
8.	"Some Sunny Day"	Irving Berlin	3:11
9.	"Bon Vivant"	Robert Emmett Dolan, Johnny Mercer	3:49
10.	"Good Companions – And Points Beyond" (with Johnny Mercer)	André Previn, Johnny Mercer	3:39
11.	"Send in the Clowns"	Stephen Sondheim	3:16
12.	"The Good Old Times"	Pete Moore, Ken Barnes,	3:34
13.	"That's What Life Is All About" (reprise)	Les Reed, Peter Dacre, Ken Barnes, Bing Crosby	1:18
