= That's What Life Is All About =

1975 single by Bing Crosby

- 1975 United Artists 45 single released in the UK, UP 35852A.

Single by Bing Crosby

from the album That's What Life Is All About
- Released: August 29, 1975
- Recorded: February 19, 1975
- Studio: Chappell & Co.
- Genre: Vocal; Jazz
- Length: 3:28
- Label: United Artists (UAG-29730)
- Songwriters: Les Reed; Peter Dacre; Ken Barnes; Bing Crosby
- Producer: Ken Barnes

Bing Crosby singles chronology
"I Love To Dance Like They Used To Dance" (1975)	"That's What Life Is All About" (1975)	"Peace on Earth/Little Drummer Boy" (1982)

"That's What Life Is All About" is a song by American singer and actor Bing Crosby from his thirty-ninth studio album, That's What Life Is All About (1975), released on August 29, 1975. It was originally written by Peter Dacre (lyrics) and Les Reed (music). Later, Crosby re-wrote the lyrics with Ken Barnes.

== Background ==
Crosby recorded the song on February 19, 1975 at Chappells in London with the Pete Moore Orchestra. The session was produced by Ken Barnes. It was included on the album That's What Life Is All About.

== Charts ==
The song was released as a single by United Artists, and the recording peaked at no. 35 in the U.S. on the Billboard Easy Listening chart, also reaching no. 41 in the UK Singles Chart. It only reached #99 on the Australian Singles Chart, staying on the chart just one week.

== Performances ==
Crosby used the song in his various concerts in 1976, including at the London Palladium (June 21–July 4, 1976), as well as promoting the song on television shows in the United Kingdom such as Parkinson, The Vera Lynn Show, Stars on Sunday and Top of the Pops. His appearance on the latter show prompted former British Prime Minister Edward Heath to attend the taping as Heath was a huge fan of Crosby's. The version sung at the Palladium was captured on the album Bing Crosby Live at the London Palladium.
