= At My Time of Life =

Studio album by Bing Crosby
- Released: June 1976
- Recorded: February 1975
- Genre: Vocal
- Length: 45:00
- Label: United Artists (UAS-29956)
- Producer: Ken Barnes

Bing Crosby chronology
Tom Sawyer (1976)	At My Time of Life (1976)	Bing Crosby Live at the London Palladium (1976)

Professional ratings
Review scores
Source	Rating
Allmusic	3/5 stars

At My Time of Life is the forty-first solo studio album by American singer and actor Bing Crosby for United Artists, mostly at Chappells Studios in London in February 1975. He was accompanied by Pete Moore and his Orchestra.

The songs from the album were included on a 3-CD set called Bing Crosby – The Complete United Artists Sessions issued by EMI Records (7243 59808 2 4) in 1997. This included several previously unreleased alternate takes and studio chat.

== Background ==
In January 1974, Crosby was seriously ill and after two weeks of tests, he underwent three and a half hours of major surgery. Two-fifths of his left lung and an abscess the size of a small orange were removed. The tumor was a rare fungus called nocardia. There were concerns initially that he would not be able to sing again and his recuperation took many months. Record producer, Ken Barnes, later heard that Bing was thinking of recording again and he quickly presented his credentials and eventually met Crosby on September 9, 1974 at the singer’s home. Arrangements were soon made for two albums to be made in London. Bing flew to London on February 18, 1975 and that afternoon visited the Chappells recording studio. He was shown the vocal booth where he would be singing but said that he did not want to work in that way. He wanted to be with the band and said, “I didn’t come seven thousand miles to sing to a pane of glass.” This worried sound engineer John Timperley who was concerned about separation problems because of the large orchestra which was to be used. Crosby was adamant however and, in the event, he successfully overcame the problems of recording in front of a full orchestra.

Over a period of eight days, Crosby, in six sessions, recorded twenty five tracks. Eleven of the tracks were issued on an LP called That's What Life Is All About. Thirteen, with the addition of the title song to be recorded in 1976, were issued on this album and the final recording was included with eleven others made in 1976 and issued on an LP called Beautiful Memories.

== Personnel ==
Full details are not given but the 3-CD set Bing Crosby – The Complete United Artists Sessions mentions the following:

"Something to Remember You By" - Don Lusher, trombone.

"Great Day" - Duncan Lamont, tenor saxophone

"Cabaret" - Keith Bird, clarinet; Ronnie Price, piano.

"Thou Swell" - Ronnie Price / Pete Moore, keyboards.

== Reception ==
The UK magazine The Gramophone reviewed the album saying: "The arrival for review of “At My Time of Life” by Bing Crosby coincided with his outstanding triumph at the London Palladium heading a bill shared by members of his family and Rosemary Clooney…Crosby brings his special brand of affable authority to all fourteen numbers, aided and embellished by Pete Moore’s arrangements and orchestrations which incorporate some deft modern touches without jeopardizing the essential nostalgia of much of this material. The sympathetic and totally aware production work of Ken Barnes also asserts itself in a practical but unobtrusive fashion, and this album is a genuine piece of popular music history of inestimable value.

== Track listing ==
Side one
No.	Title	Writer(s)	Length
1.	"At My Time of Life"	Cyril Ornadel, Hal Shaper	3:09
2.	"Cabaret"	John Kander, Fred Ebb	3:21
3.	"Something to Remember You By"	Arthur Schwartz, Howard Dietz	3:55
4.	"Heat Wave"	Irving Berlin	3:52
5.	"My Heart Stood Still"	Richard Rodgers, Lorenz Hart	2:59
6.	"Razzle Dazzle"	John Kander, Fred Ebb	2:50
7.	"Hello, Dolly"	Jerry Herman	2:34

Side two
No.	Title	Writer(s)	Length
8.	"How Are Things in Glocca Morra?"	Burton Lane, E. Y. "Yip" Harburg	3:38
9.	"I Got Rhythm"	George Gershwin, Ira Gershwin	3:02
10.	"Looking at You"	Cole Porter	3:02
11.	"I'll Never Fall in Love Again"	Burt Bacharach, Hal David	3:18
12.	"Thou Swell"	Richard Rodgers, Lorenz Hart	3:26
13.	"With a Song in My Heart"	Richard Rodgers, Lorenz Hart	3:05
14.	"Great Day"	Vincent Youmans, Billy Rose, Edward Eliscu	2:18
