= Tom Sawyer (disambiguation) =

Tom Sawyer is a fictional character created by Mark Twain.

Tom Sawyer may also refer to:

- The Adventures of Tom Sawyer, Twain's original novel featuring the character
- The Adventures of Tom Sawyer (disambiguation)

== Art, entertainment, and media ==
=== In film and television ===
- Tom Sawyer (1907 film), a silent film produced by Kalem Studios
- Tom Sawyer (1917 film), a silent film produced by Paramount Pictures, starring Jack Pickford
- Tom Sawyer (1930 film), first sound film version, starring Jackie Coogan
- Tom Sawyer (1938 film), first Technicolor film version, produced by David O. Selznick and starring Tommy Kelly
- Tom Sawyer (1956 musical), a TV musical starring John Sharpe as Tom Sawyer
- Tom Sawyer (1973 film), a musical film starring Johnny Whitaker as Tom Sawyer and Jodie Foster as Becky Thatcher
- Tom Sawyer (2000 film), an animated film that features anthropomorphic animal characters
- Anthony Cooper (Lost) or Tom Sawyer, a fictional character in the TV series Lost

=== Other media ===
- "Tom Sawyer" (song), a 1981 rock song by Rush
- Tom Sawyer (album), a reading by Bing Crosby of an abridged version of The Adventures of Tom Sawyer

== Politicians ==
- Tom Sawyer (Kansas politician) (born 1958), American politician, member of the Kansas House of Representatives
- Tom Sawyer (Maine politician) (born 1949), American politician and businessman from Maine
- Tom Sawyer (Ohio politician) (1945–2023), Democratic congressman from Ohio from 1987 to 2003
- Tom Sawyer, Baron Sawyer (1943–2025), British politician and trade unionist

== Other people ==
- Tom Sawyer (American football), American college football coach
- Tom Sawyer (darts player) (born 1969), American darts player
- Thomas Sawyer (footballer) (1874–?), British footballer
- Thomas Jefferson Sawyer, American Universalist minister and educator
