= A Couple of Song and Dance Men =

Studio album by Fred Astaire, Bing Crosby
- Released: 1975
- Recorded: July 15–17, 1975, at CTS, Wembley, Middlesex, London
- Genre: Vocal jazz
- Length: 34:05
- Label: United Artists (UAS 29888)
- Producer: Ken Barnes

Bing Crosby chronology
That's What Life Is All About (1975)	A Couple of Song and Dance Men (1975)	Tom Sawyer (1976)

Fred Astaire chronology
Attitude Dancing (1975)	A Couple of Song and Dance Men (1975)	They Can't Take These Away from Me (1976)

Professional ratings
Review scores
Source	Rating
Allmusic	4/5 stars

A Couple of Song and Dance Men is a 1975 vinyl album made by Fred Astaire and Bing Crosby for United Artists. It was recorded with Pete Moore and his Orchestra, and the Johnny Evans Singers in July 1975 at the Music Centre, Wembley.

The songs from the album were included on a 3-CD set called “Bing Crosby – The Complete United Artists Sessions” issued by EMI Records (7243 59808 2 4) in 1997. This included several studio chat sound bites.

In 1999, all the tracks from the album were also included on a 3-CD set called "Fred Astaire - The Complete London Sessions" issued by EMI Records (7243 5 20045 2 2) which included session sound bites.

== Background ==
Fred Astaire had agreed to producer Ken Barnes' request to make recordings for two long-playing albums in London. When it was found that Astaire's visit would coincide with Bing Crosby's stay in the UK, Barnes obtained the agreement of both artists to make an album together. In three morning sessions, held on consecutive days, they recorded thirteen tracks of which eleven were duets and two were solos in which they each sang a number famously associated with the other.

== Reception ==
Billboard summed it up by saying: "Enjoyable set from two of the finer singers of our time, cut in London, produced by Ken Barnes and featuring the Pete Moore Orchestra. Lots of cuts from movies the two have appeared in with material from Berlin, Mercer, Carmichael and Scott Joplin. All standards well done, with the pair singing together or taking solos."

The UK magazine The Gramophone reviewed the album saying: "Two indestructibles of show business, united on one record is an invincible formula, particularly when the two involved are “A Couple of Song And Dance Men” like Fred Astaire and Bing Crosby. The rapport and mutual esteem between these two splendid troupers are obvious and delightful, although the verbal adlibbing and asides are occasionally overdone and not always intelligible to the listener..."

== Track listing ==
Side One
No.	Title	Writer(s)	Length
1.	"Roxie"	John Kander, Fred Ebb	2:50
2.	"Top Billing"	Ken Barnes, Pete Moore	3:16
3.	"Sing"	Joe Raposo	3:22
4.	"It's Easy to Remember (And So Hard to Forget)" (Fred Astaire only)	Lorenz Hart, Richard Rodgers	3:06
5.	"In the Cool, Cool, Cool of the Evening"	Hoagy Carmichael, Johnny Mercer	3:22
6.	"Pick Yourself Up"	Dorothy Fields, Jerome Kern	5:04

Side two
No.	Title	Writer(s)	Length
1.	"How Lucky Can You Get"	Kander, Ebb	3:30
2.	"I've a Shooting Box in Scotland"	Cole Porter, T. Lawrason Riggs	2:43
3.	"Change Partners" (Bing Crosby only)	Irving Berlin	2:52
4.	"Mr. Keyboard Man ("The Entertainer")"	Barnes, Scott Joplin, Moore	2:47
5.	"Spring, Spring, Spring"	Gene de Paul, Mercer	4:02
6.	"A Couple of Song and Dance Men"	Berlin	4:02
7.	"Top Billing" (reprise; finale)	Barnes, Moore	1:48

== Personnel ==
=== Performance ===
- Fred Astaire – vocals, tap
- Bing Crosby – vocals
- Pete Moore;– arranger

=== Production ===
- Ken Barnes – producer
