= Bing Crosby Live at the London Palladium =

1976 live album by Bing Crosby

Live album by Bing Crosby
- Released: 1976
- Recorded: June 24–25, 1976
- Genre: Vocal
- Label: K-Tel Records (NE-951)
- Producer: Ken Barnes

Bing Crosby chronology
At My Time of Life (1976)	Bing Crosby Live at the London Palladium (1976)	Feels Good, Feels Right (1976)

Bing Crosby Live at the London Palladium is a 1976 vinyl 2-LP live recording of the show put on by Bing Crosby, Rosemary Clooney, Kathryn Crosby and Ted Rogers at the London Palladium from June 21 to July 4, 1976. Musical support was provided by the Pete Moore Big Band and the Joe Bushkin Quartet. The Crosby children (Harry, Mary and Nathaniel) also took part.

The performances on June 25 and 26 were recorded by Ken Barnes and issued as a double album by K-Tel International under licence from United Artists Records.

The album entered the UK charts in November 1977 and peaked at No. 9.

Most of the songs from the album were issued on CD for the first time in 1997 by EMI Records on a CD called “Bing Crosby 50th Anniversary Concert at the London Palladium” (catalogue No. 7243 8 57547 2 2). Omissions were the Crosby Family “Round” and tracks 15–17, 33–34 and 36. An additional track – “Great Day” – was included and it is suspected that this came from the recording session for the At My Time of Life album.

The 3-CD set called “Bing Crosby – The Complete United Artists Sessions” issued by EMI Records (7243 59808 2 4) in 1997 included tracks 15–16, 33–34 and 36 but not track 17 and the Crosby Family “Round” neither of which have ever been issued in digital form.

== Background ==
Bing Crosby had been tempted back into the recording studios by producer Ken Barnes and quickly made three albums with him in London. He also made two LPs which he financed himself and during an extended stay in the U.K. in the summer of 1975, he made many appearances on radio and television shows. His appetite for show business seemed to have returned and then he decided to give a series of concerts to celebrate his fifty years as an entertainer. Starting in California, and then coming across to the London Palladium for a two-week stint, his performances were a revelation to many and Crosby was clearly enjoying himself.

The opening of the show was clever, featuring as it did a British 1944 newsreel of Crosby singing at the opening of the Stage Door Canteen in London. The screen then lifted away, the orchestra played the opening bars of “Where the Blue of the Night,” and Crosby walked onto the stage to tumultuous applause. In unusually high temperatures, he was on stage at the Palladium for most of the two and a half hour show and he wound up with a thirty-five minute medley of his old hits, with the audience joining in enthusiastically, before closing with the song “That's What Life Is All About.”

The proceeds of the show went to the National Society for Cancer Relief, the Playing Fields Association, and the Duke of Edinburgh’s Award Scheme.

== Personnel ==
No details for the Pete Moore Big Band.

Joe Bushkin Quartet

- Joe Bushkin – piano
- Johnny Smith – guitar
- Jake Hanna – percussion
- Lennie Bush – bass

== Reception ==
Variety reviewed the show itself. "On opening night (21) the vet turned in a superlative performance and one perhaps not expected from a performer of his years. Though he looked frail, even tottery at times, the power and warmth of his voice is remarkably preserved, his charisma still intact, his wit still keen and his sense of showbiz paramount…Crosby was on stage — and on his feet, yet — for a good deal of the three hour initialer. He managed, moreover, to finish in a sprint noticeably stronger than his start. The Crosby show majors in sentimentality, but cleverly so, stopping short of goo, gush or schmaltz. He introduced his family who went through some musical romps while wife Kathryn showed a real talent for dancing. Crosby’s nostalgic repertory was spiked with a handful of new songs, indicating an awareness of what gives these days, though the crowd stood after his reprise in singalong style some 30 or so standards from the ‘20s, ‘30s and ‘40s… Show was well balanced, perfectly paced, expertly interlinked and a satisfyingly complete presentation."

Also Geoffrey Wansell writing for the prestigious newspaper The Times saw the show and commented: "The voice of the Old Groaner may not be quite as smooth now at 72. The range and register are only just there, but the pitch is still perfect and the tone and phrasing are magical. No one has ever missed a single word, or a single meaning, of a song that Crosby has sung. The “strolling player” as he calls himself, treated a rapturous audience to a cross section of some of his four-thousand songs he has recorded in fifty years or more of show business. Still looking more like a bank clerk than a star, he reminded them of the 300 million records he has sold in 27 languages and 88 countries in that time …"

== Track listing ==
All tracks featuring Bing Crosby unless annotated.

SIDE ONE

No.	Title	Writer(s)	Length
1.	"Where the Blue of the Night (orchestra)"	Fred E. Ahlert, Roy Turk, Bing Crosby	0:40
2.	"The Pleasure of Your Company"	André Previn, Johnny Mercer	1:36
3.	"Mary Lou"	Abe Lyman, George Waggner, J. Russel Robinson	0:57
4.	"Where the Morning Glories Grow"	Richard Whiting, Gus Kahn, Raymond B. Egan	3:23
5.	"At My Time of Life"	Cyril Ornadel, Hal Shaper	3:11
6.	"On a Slow Boat to China (Bing Crosby & Rosemary Clooney)"	Frank Loesser	2:55
7.	"By Myself (Rosemary Clooney)"	Arthur Schwartz, Howard Dietz	3:46
8.	"Tenderly (Rosemary Clooney)"	Walter Gross, Jack Lawrence	2:15
9.	"50 Ways to Leave Your Lover (Rosemary Clooney)"	Paul Simon	5:04

SIDE TWO

No.	Title	Writer(s)	Length
10.	"Send in the Clowns"	Stephen Sondheim	3:32
11.	"Gone Fishin' (Bing Crosby & Ted Rogers)"	Charles Kenny, Nick Kenny	2:48
12.	"Now You Has Jazz (Bing Crosby & Joe Bushkin Quartet)"	Cole Porter	1:04
13.	"Medley (The Man That Got Away / Hallelujah!) (Joe Bushkin Quartet)"	Harold Arlen, Ira Gershwin / Vincent Youmans, Clifford Grey, Leo Robin	4:34
14.	"Sing (Bing Crosby and his family)"	Joe Raposo	2:57
15.	"You've Got a Friend (Bing Crosby & Harry Crosby)"	Carole King	2:44

SIDE THREE

No.	Title	Writer(s)	Length
16.	"My Cup Runneth Over (Bing Crosby & Kathryn Crosby)"	Harvey Schmidt	3:00
17.	"Play a Simple Melody (Bing Crosby & Harry Crosby)"	Irving Berlin	1:55

Crosby Family “Round” (Bing Crosby and his family) (7:59)

No.	Title	Writer(s)	Length
18.	"Row, Row, Row Your Boat"	Traditional
19.	"Frère Jacques"	Traditional
20.	"A Kookaburra sits in the Old Gum Tree"	Marion Sinclair
21.	"Loch Lomond"	Traditional
22.	"Annie Laurie"	Alicia Scott, William Douglas
23.	"My Bonnie"	Traditional
24.	"The Daring Young Man on the Flying Trapeze"	Gaston Lyle, George Leybourne
25.	"The Whiffenpoof Song"	Tod B. Galloway, Meade Minnigerode, George S. Pomeroy, Rudy Vallée
26.	"The Drinking Song"	Sigmund Romberg, Dorothy Donnelly
27.	"Drink to Me Only with Thine Eyes"	Traditional
28.	"Dark Eyes"	Traditional
29.	"You Are My Sunshine"	Jimmie Davis, Charles Mitchell
30.	"She'll Be Coming 'Round the Mountain"	Traditional
31.	"Swing Low, Sweet Chariot"	Traditional
32.	"Row, Row, Row Your Boat (reprise)"	Traditional

SIDE THREE (continued)

No.	Title	Writer(s)	Length
33.	"The Way We Were"	Marvin Hamlisch, Alan and Marilyn Bergman	2:20
34.	"Cuando calienta el sol"	Carlos Martinoli, Carlos Rigual, Mario Rigual	3:57
35.	"Just One of Those Things (Rosemary Clooney, drums Miguel Ferrer)"	Cole Porter	3:08
36.	"A Song for You (Rosemary Clooney, drums Miguel Ferrer)"	Leon Russell	3:36

SIDE FOUR

The Crosby Medley – Bing Crosby and the Joe Bushkin Quartet (30:18)

No.	Title	Writer(s)	Length
37.	"I Surrender Dear"	Harry Barris, Gordon Clifford
38.	"Swinging on a Star"	Jimmy Van Heusen, Johnny Burke
39.	"Wrap Your Troubles in Dreams"	Harry Barris, Ted Koehler, Billy Moll
40.	"True Love (Bing Crosby & Mary Crosby)"	Cole Porter
41.	"Don't Fence Me In"	Cole Porter
42.	"Pennies from Heaven"	Arthur Johnston, Johnny Burke
43.	"Blue Hawaii"	Ralph Rainger, Leo Robin
44.	"Sweet Leilani"	Harry Owens
45.	"Too-Ra-Loo-Ra-Loo-Ral (That's an Irish Lullaby)"	J. R. Shannon
46.	"Just One More Chance"	Arthur Johnston, Sam Coslow
47.	"Them There Eyes"	Maceo Pinkard, Doris Tauber, William G. Tracey
48.	"Moonlight Becomes You"	Jimmy Van Heusen, Johnny Burke
49.	"I'll Be Seeing You"	Sammy Fain, Irving Kahal
50.	"The White Cliffs of Dover"	Walter Kent, Nat Burton
51.	"When the Lights Go On Again"	Eddie Seiler, Sol Marcus, Bennie Benjamin
52.	"Ac-Cent-Tchu-Ate the Positive"	Harold Arlen, Johnny Mercer
53.	"Please"	Ralph Rainger, Leo Robin
54.	"Baby Face"	Harry Akst, Benny Davis
55.	"South of the Border"	Jimmy Kennedy, Michael Carr
56.	"Galway Bay"	Arthur Colahan
57.	"Dinah"	Harry Akst, Sam M. Lewis, Joe Young
58.	"San Fernando Valley"	Gordon Jenkins
59.	"I Found a Million Dollar Baby (in a Five and Ten Cent Store)"	Harry Warren, Billy Rose, Mort Dixon
60.	"San Antonio Rose"	Bob Wills
61.	"I'm an Old Cowhand"	Johnny Mercer
62.	"In a Little Spanish Town"	Mabel Wayne, Sam M. Lewis, Joe Young
63.	"Wait 'Till the Sun Shines, Nellie (Bing Crosby & Kathryn Crosby)"	Harry Von Tilzer, Andrew B. Sterling
64.	"It's Easy To Remember"	Richard Rodgers, Lorenz Hart
65.	"Blue Skies"	Irving Berlin
66.	"It's Been a Long, Long Time"	Jule Styne, Sammy Cahn
67.	"Mississippi Mud"	Harry Barris, James Cavanaugh
68.	"Ol' Man River"	Jerome Kern, Oscar Hammerstein II

SIDE FOUR (continued)

No.	Title	Writer(s)	Length
69.	"That's What Life Is All About"	Les Reed, Peter Dacre, Ken Barnes, Bing Crosby	3:14
70.	"Where the Blue of the Night (reprise) (orchestra)"	Fred E. Ahlert, Roy Turk, Bing Crosby	1:26
