= Devonshire Sound Studios =

Recording studio in California, USA

Coordinates: 34.16512°N 118.3645°W

- Industry: Recording studio
- Founded: 1959
- Defunct: 1992
- Fate: Refurbished
- Headquarters: North Hollywood, California, United States
- Key people: David Mancini

Devonshire Sound Studios was an American music recording studio designed and built by David Mancini located at 10733 Magnolia Boulevard in North Hollywood, California. Mancini is also known for designing and building the California Hollywood Recording Studios. The original Devonshire Studio was located in Granada Hills and the original partners were Ray Dewey, Glen Pace, Dick Stricklin and a little later Bill Comstock of The Four Freshmen. Ray met Bill when The Freshmen were recording Ray's song "Girls" for Liberty Records. Originally designed as a production studio, Devonshire soon required more space, more studios, a live chamber, parking, etc. The studio relocated to North Hollywood in 1971 and Mancini became a partner and builder.

At its peak as a music recording studio, Devonshire was more than 8,800 square feet (820 m^{2}) and housed four studios, the largest of which was 25 feet (7.6 m) by 46 feet (14 m). The facility also included control rooms, three acoustical echo chambers, a lounge, a bar, a billiard and ping-pong table room, and a whirlpool spa.

== Selected recordings ==
Many hits songs and albums were recorded at Devonshire. Billy Joel's album Streetlife Serenade was recorded at the studios in the spring of 1974.

Jackie DeShannon's album New Arrangement was recorded at Devonshire in September 1975 under the direction of Michael Stewart on the Columbia label. Session artists and arrangers who worked on the album included Brian Wilson who sang backing vocals with his then wife Marilyn Wilson-Rutherford, Richard Carpenter who would go onto record Boat To Sail on the 1976 album Kind Of A Hush, Larry Knechtel, drummer Ronnie Tutt, Randy Edelman, Kenny Rankin, bassist John Kahn, and Buddy Emmons.

In October and November 1976, Bing Crosby recorded tracks at the studios under the direction of Ken Barnes for the album Beautiful Memories.

In 1976 Weather Report recorded Heavy Weather at the studios. Brian Risner, the engineer for Weather Report from 1972 to 1984, described the "air" in Weather Report's recordings as a product of the room acoustics at Devonshire.

Ringo Starr recorded at the studios in August 1980 for the album Stop and Smell the Roses.

The Jacksons recorded parts of their 1980 album Triumph at the studios.

Kelle Musgrave took over as studio manager in 1988 and bought in Warner rep and producer Rob Cavallo who had recorded and mixed Green Day’s breakout record Dookie and The Muffs eponymous first album. Additionally, Musgrave convinced producers John Purdell and Duane Baron to give the studio a shot. They went on to produce Ozzy Osbourne's legendary No More Tears, plus albums for Cinderella, Heart and many more. Tom Petty recorded parts of Full Moon Fever at Devonshire. Many other acts recorded at the studio including Bell Biv Devoe, Tupac, Beastie Boys, Suicidal Tendencies, Mötley Crüe, Fleetwood Mac, Crosby, Stills & Nash, The Hollies, Popular Glove and Roger Waters.

== Nirvana's Nevermind: The Devonshire mixes ==
The Devonshire mixes were released as part of the 20th Anniversary Edition of Nirvana's Nevermind album. Producer Butch Vig began mixing Nevermind at Devonshire as soon as they were finished recording the album in May 1991; however, the label ultimately hired Andy Wallace to mix the record at a different studio. Vig pulled out the original mixes years later as Nirvana was getting ready to release the 20th Anniversary Edition. These original mixes are now known as "the Devonshire mixes".

== Location site today ==
The original North Hollywood Devonshire Studios building is now owned and operated by Salami Studios who refurbished it in 1992. Salami is a recording studio used primarily for cartoon voice-over work. Notable shows include SpongeBob SquarePants, The Ricky Gervais Show, Hey Arnold!, Dexter's Laboratory, The Adventures of Jimmy Neutron, Boy Genius, Johnny Bravo, The Proud Family, and the Kung Fu Panda film series.

The original Granada Hills Devonshire Studios buildings were demolished and replaced with apartments.
