= Beautiful Memories (album) =

Studio album by Bing Crosby
- Released: 1977
- Recorded: 1976
- Genre: Vocal
- Label: United Artists Records (UAS 30116)
- Producer: Ken Barnes

Bing Crosby chronology
Feels Good, Feels Right (1976)	Beautiful Memories (1977)	Bingo Viejo (1977)

Beautiful Memories is the forty-third solo studio album by American singer and actor Bing Crosby for United Artists Records. It was Crosby’s final album of new material to be released during his lifetime. Eight of the songs were recorded at Devonshire Sound Studios, Magnolia Boulevard, North Hollywood on October 19 and 29, 1976. The orchestral accompaniment was recorded in London on September 10 and 11, 1976 and Crosby dubbed his voice in Los Angeles. Of the other four songs on the LP, one had been recorded on February 26, 1975 (track 9) (see That's What Life Is All About) and two were recorded on January 19, 1976 (tracks 4 and 12) at United Western Studios, Los Angeles. The title song was dubbed by Crosby on November 5, 1976, also at United Western Studios, using the track recorded in London. Crosby was accompanied by Pete Moore and his Orchestra throughout the album and by The Johnny Evans Singers on certain tracks.

The songs from the album were included on a 3-CD set called “Bing Crosby – The Complete United Artists Sessions” issued by EMI Records (7243 59808 2 4) in 1997.

== Personnel ==
Full details are not given for the recordings but the 3-CD set “Bing Crosby – The Complete United Artists Sessions” mentions the following:

The More I See You – Tommy Whittle (tenor sax)

Déjà Vu (As Tho’ You Never Went Away) – Duncan Lamont (tenor sax)

== Reception ==
The UK magazine The Gramophone reviewed the album saying: "Sadness inevitably surrounds “Beautiful Memories” by the late Bing Crosby, which must be one of the last LPs we will enjoy by this splendid gentleman with fifty years of consummate artistry to his credit, although we are advised of at least one more in the pipeline from Polydor. It is not his best album by any means, but Crosby never made a bad one to my knowledge, and there is much of value and interest in his versions of mostly recent pop ballads such as “A Little Love and Understanding,” “My Resistance Is Low,” “When a Child Is Born,” and “The Woman on Your Arm.” It is certainly a very adequate valedictory souvenir from a singer who has left beautiful memories for a multitude around the world."

== Track listing ==
SIDE ONE

No.	Title	Writer(s)	Length
1.	"Beautiful Memories"	Roger Cook, Herbie Flowers	3:46
2.	"A Little Love and Understanding"	Gilbert Bécaud, Marcel Stellman	3:17
3.	"My Resistance Is Low"	Hoagy Carmichael, Harold Adamson	2:18
4.	"Children"	Cyril Ornadel, Hal Shaper	3:52
5.	"Déjà Vu (As Tho’ You Never Went Away)"	Pete Moore, Ken Barnes	3:12
6.	"When a Child Is Born"	Ciro Dammicco, Fred Jay	3:22

SIDE TWO

No.	Title	Writer(s)	Length
7.	"The More I See You"	Harry Warren, Mack Gordon	2:26
8.	"What I Did for Love"	Marvin Hamlisch, Edward Kleban	3:22
9.	"Yours Sincerely"	Richard Rodgers, Lorenz Hart	2:43
10.	"We've Only Just Begun"	Roger Nichols, Paul Williams	3:55
11.	"The Woman on Your Arm"	Randy Edelman	3:53
12.	"The Only Way to Go"	Marvin Hamlisch, Tim Rice	2:56
