= List of awards and nominations received by Fred Astaire =

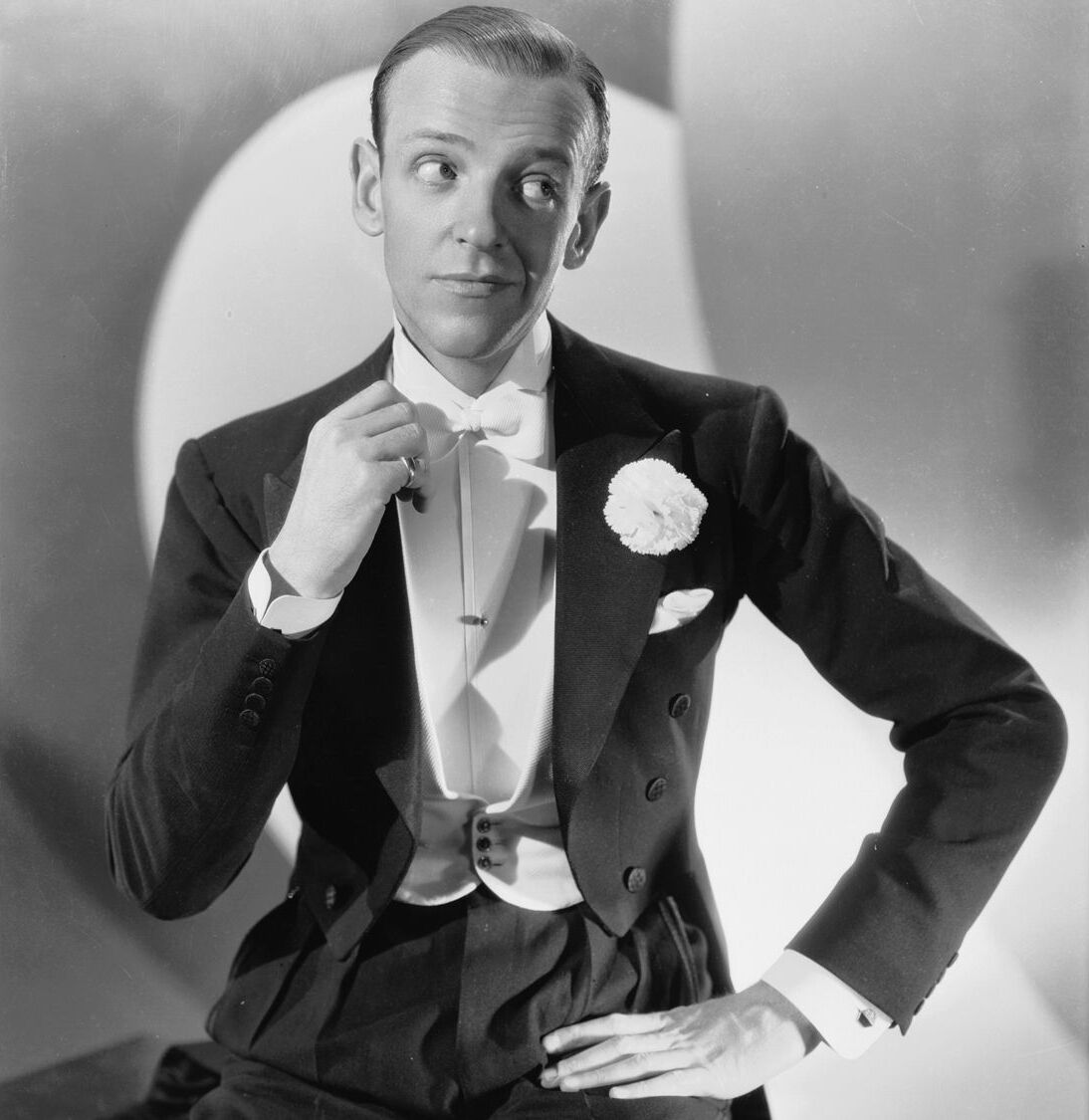
Fred Astaire in 1941

This article is a List of awards and nominations received by Fred Astaire.

Fred Astaire was an American actor, dancer, and singer. Over his career he received several awards, including a BAFTA Award, three Primetime Emmy Awards, and two Golden Globe Awards. He also received several honorary awards including the academy Honorary Award in 1950, the Golden Globe Cecil B. DeMille Award in 1960, the Kennedy Center Honors in 1970, and the AFI Life Achievement Award in 1981.

For his role as a flirty conman in The Towering Inferno (1974), he received the BAFTA Award for Best Actor in a Supporting Role and the Golden Globe Award for Best Supporting Actor – Motion Picture as well as a nomination for the Academy Award for Best Supporting Actor. He also earned the Golden Globe Award for Best Actor – Motion Picture Musical or Comedy for playing Bert Kalmar in the musical Three Little Words (1950).

== Major associations ==
=== Academy Awards ===
Year	Category	Work	Result	Ref.
1950	Academy Honorary Award		Won	
1974	Best Supporting Actor	The Towering Inferno	Nominated	

=== BAFTA Awards ===
Year	Category	Work	Result	Ref.
1975	Best Actor in a Supporting Role	The Towering Inferno	Won	

=== Emmy Awards ===
Year	Category	Work	Result	Ref.
Primetime Emmy Awards
1959	Best Single Performance by an Actor	An Evening with Fred Astaire	Won	
1960	Outstanding Performance in a Variety Program	Another Evening with Fred Astaire	Nominated	
1961	Outstanding Performance in a Variety Program	Astaire Time	Won	
1968	Outstanding Musical or Variety Program	The Fred Astaire Show	Nominated	
1978	Outstanding Lead Actor in a Drama or Comedy Special	A Family Upside Down	Won	

=== Golden Globe Awards ===
Year	Category	Work	Result	Ref.
1950	Best Actor in a Motion Picture – Comedy or Musical	Three Little Words	Won	
1959	Best Supporting Actor – Motion Picture	On the Beach	Nominated	
1960	Cecil B. DeMille Award	—N/a	Won	
1961	Best Actor in a Motion Picture – Comedy or Musical	The Pleasure of His Company	Nominated	
1968	Best Actor in a Motion Picture – Comedy or Musical	Finian's Rainbow	Nominated	
1974	Best Supporting Actor – Motion Picture	The Towering Inferno	Won	

== Honorary awards ==
Organizations	Year	Notes	Ref.
Hollywood Walk of Fame	1960	Inducted into the with a motion pictures star at 6756 Hollywood Boulevard	
George Eastman House	1965	The George Eastman Award for "outstanding contributions to motion pictures"	
American Theater Hall of Fame	1972	Inducted	
Film Society at Lincoln Center	1973	Lincoln Center Gala	
Kennedy Center Honors	1978	First recipient of the award	
American National Theatre Association	1978	National Artist Award for "contributing immeasurably to the American Theatre"	
American Film Institute	1981	Lifetime Achievement Award	
National Museum of Dance	1987	Mr. & Mrs. Cornelius Vanderbilt Whitney Hall of Fame	
Recording Academy	1989	Posthumous award of Grammy Lifetime Achievement Award	
Television Hall of Fame	1989	Posthumous induction	

== Tributes ==
- 1938: Invited to place his hand and footprints in cement at Grauman's Chinese Theatre, Hollywood
- 1959: Dance Magazine award
- 1961: Voted Champion of Champions – Best Television performer in annual television critics and columnists poll conducted by Television Today and Motion Picture Daily
- 1968: Inducted into the Hall of Fame of the International Best Dressed List
- 1972: Named Musical Comedy Star of the Century by Liberty: The Nostalgia Magazine
- 1975: Won the David di Donatello Award for The Towering Inferno.
- 1975: "You Gave Me the Answer", a song by Wings written by Paul McCartney in Astaire's style and dedicated to him in concert.
- 1982: The Anglo-American Contemporary Dance Foundation announced creation of the Astaire Awards "to honor Fred Astaire and his sister Adele and to reward the achievement of an outstanding dancer or dancers"
- 1987: The Capezio Dance Shoe Award (co-awarded with Rudolf Nureyev)
- 1988: Posthumous dedication in Michael Jackson's autobiography Moonwalk
- 1990: "Vogue", a single by Madonna, mentions Astaire in its lyrics
- 1991: Posthumous induction into the Ballroom Dancer's Hall of Fame
- 1991: "Fred Astaire", a song by Donna Summer on her Mistaken Identity album
- 1992: The Dancing House in Prague is originally named "Fred and Ginger"
- 1999: Posthumous award of Grammy Hall of Fame Award for the 1952 album The Astaire Story
- 1999: "Just Like Fred Astaire", a single by the English rock band James
- 2000: Ava Astaire McKenzie unveiled a plaque in honor of her father, erected by the citizens of Lismore, County Waterford, Ireland
- 2000: "Fred Astaire", a song by Lucky Boys Confusion
- 2003: Referenced in the animated feature The Triplets of Belleville, in which Astaire is eaten by his shoes after a fast-paced dance act
- 2004: "Take You On A Cruise", a single by Interpol, references Astaire in its lyrics
- 2004: The "Adele and Fred Astaire Ballroom" added on the top floor of Gottlieb Storz Mansion in Astaire's hometown of Omaha
- 2004: "I Am Fred Astaire", a song by Taking Back Sunday
- 2006: "Fred Astaire" single released by the California rock band Lamps
- 2008: Life and work honored at Oriel College, Oxford
- 2008: Posthumous induction into the Online Film & Television Association (Film Hall of Fame)
- 2011, 2013: "Fred Astaire", a song, in a Portuguese and a later English version by Clarice Falcão
- 2012: "Fred Astaire", a single and video by San Cisco
- 2018: "Fred Astaire", a single by Jukebox The Ghost
- 2018: Posthumous induction into the Online Film & Television Association (Television Hall of Fame)
- 2019: "Movement", a single by Hozier, references Astaire in its lyrics
- 2021: "Balcony Man", the final track on the album Carnage by Nick Cave and Warren Ellis, references Astaire in its lyrics.
- TBA: An untitled biopic is in development at Sony Pictures, starring Tom Holland. Lee Hall is rewriting a script originally written by Noah Pink and Paul King will be the director. The project centers on the relationship between Fred and his sister Adele.
