= Robyn Smith =

American jockey

Personal information
- Full name: Robyn Smith Astaire
- Born: August 14, 1944 (age 82) San Francisco, California, US
- Occupation: Jockey
- Height: 5 ft 7 in (1.70 m)
- Weight: 110 lb (50 kg)
- Spouse: Fred Astaire (m. 1980; died 1987)

Horse racing career
- Sport: Horse racing
- Career winnings: $2,692,848
- Career wins: 247

Major racing wins
- $27,450 Paumonok Handicap

Honors
- New York Turf Writers Association

Significant horses
- North Sea, Ramblin Robyn, Swift Yorky

Robyn Smith Astaire (born August 14, 1944) is an American retired jockey. Active from 1969 to 1980, Smith accumulated 247 wins in California and New York race tracks, and became the first female jockey to win a stakes race in 1973.

== Early life ==
Smith is largely evasive about the details of her early life. She told Sports Illustrated in her 1972 cover profile that she was born in San Francisco, California, on August 14, 1944, but the journal could find no birth record of a Robyn Caroline Smith for several years around that time. Claims that she had attended Stanford University as an English major, and that she was under contract with Metro-Goldwyn-Mayer were similarly debunked. In 1997, she told the Los Angeles Times that she was "sold" as an infant, and went through a series of foster homes.

== Jockey career ==
In April 1969, Kjell Qvale agreed to let Smith ride one of his horses, and on April 3, Smith became the first female jockey in Northern California, finishing second at a race at Golden Gate Fields upon Swift Yorky. When Money Road finished last at the same track a week later, however, the decision to grant her an apprentice jockey license came into question. The decision of whether or not to award her the license was dependent upon Al Shelhamer, who had not seen Smith ride in person and would have to consult film of her first two Golden Gate races. Her license was granted, and in her first race as a licensed jockey, Smith and Swift Yorky finished in ninth place at Golden Gate Fields on April 16, 1969. The next year, Smith secured her first New York victory atop Hill Cloud at Aqueduct Racetrack in Queens.

Smith's early victories in New York and California were seen as an inspiration to future woman riders. In 1973, leading up to the "Battle of the Sexes" tennis match, Smith challenged Bobby Riggs to a horse race, while joking that he would turn down the challenge because "He doesn't want to get himself killed." While many Thoroughbred owners were reluctant to lend their horses to a female rider, Smith found an ally in Alfred Gwynne Vanderbilt Jr., the chairman of the New York Racing Association during her jockey career. Their business connection led to rumors of a romantic involvement between Vanderbilt and Smith.

Smith appeared on the cover of Sports Illustrated on July 31, 1972. Shortly afterwards, it was announced that she would become the first female rider to be honored by the New York Turf Writers Association in Saratoga Springs, New York. Retired textile executive Nathan Isaacs named a filly, Ramblin Robyn, after Smith, and she rode the horse to victory at Aqueduct in December 1973.

After starting her 1973 racing season with a spill atop Faithville Ruler at Santa Anita Park, on March 1, 1973, Smith became the first female jockey to win a stakes race, winning the $27,450 Paumonok Handicap at Aqueduct Racetrack on the back of North Sea. On October 3, 1975, Smith became the first female jockey to win three races in one afternoon at a major New York track. She turned three victories at Belmont Park, riding Lead Line, Slink, and Togs Drone.

By 1978, Smith's career had largely come to a standstill, recording only one victory in 55 races, and struggling to find trainers. Most of her income was provided by television endorsement deals. After a final ride at Saratoga on July 30, 1980, Smith announced her official retirement from the sport on August 9.

== Later life ==
On January 1, 1973, a friend introduced Smith to Fred Astaire at Santa Anita. She went on to marry Astaire on June 24, 1980, at the Astaire home in Beverly Hills, California. At the time of their marriage, Astaire was 81 and Smith was 35. After Astaire's death in 1987, Smith became embroiled in a series of legal battles over the use of her late husband's image. Most notably, Smith prevented the John F. Kennedy Center for the Performing Arts from using video footage of Astaire during its 1992 televised tribute to his longtime Hollywood collaborator Ginger Rogers. In 1997, Smith agreed to a deal which resulted in commercials in which old footage was digitally altered such that Astaire appeared to dance with Dirt Devil brand mops and vacuum cleaners, over the objections of Astaire's daughter Ava. In 1998, the U.S. 9th Circuit Court of Appeals ruled against Smith in a decision over whether an instructional videotape manufacturer could use public domain footage of Astaire in the films Second Chorus and Royal Wedding to teach dance steps.

Following Astaire's 1987 death, Smith took up aviation, earning pilot certification in a series of airplanes and helicopters.
