= The Adventures of Tom Sawyer (disambiguation) =

The Adventures of Tom Sawyer is an 1876 novel by Mark Twain.

The Adventures of Tom Sawyer may also refer to:

- The Adventures of Tom Sawyer (1938 film), a 1938 American adaptation
- The Adventures of Tom Sawyer (1973 film), a 1973 musical film adaptation by the Sherman Brothers
- The Adventures of Tom Sawyer (1986 film), an animated film produced by Burbank Films Australia
- The Adventures of Tom Sawyer (musical), a musical comedy
- The Adventures of Tom Sawyer (video game), a video game for the Nintendo Entertainment System
- The Adventures of Tom Sawyer (1960 TV series), a British television serial
- The Adventures of Tom Sawyer (1980 TV series), a Japanese anime series

== See also ==
- Tom Sawyer (disambiguation)
