= News Review =

British news magazine

- Staff writers: Reg Freeson, Peter Dacre
- Categories: News, Commentary
- Frequency: Weekly
- First issue: 1936; 90 years ago
- Final issue: 1950; 76 years ago; merged into Illustrated magazine
- Company: Cosmopolitan Press; Odhams Press
- Country: United Kingdom
- Based in: 198 High Holborn, London
- Language: English

News Review was a British news magazine, first published by Cosmopolitan Press in 1936. Its publishers, who also launched Cavalcade around the same time, envisaged News Review as a competitor to the U.S. Time magazine. It was later sold to Odhams Press. The headquarters was in London. The magazine ended its run by eventually being amalgamated into Odhams' Illustrated magazine in 1950.

Writers for the News Review included Reg Freeson and a young Peter Dacre.
