= They Can't Take These Away from Me =

Studio album by Fred Astaire
- Released: 1976
- Recorded: 1976
- Genre: Vocal jazz
- Length: 40:53
- Label: United Artists
- Producer: Ken Barnes

Fred Astaire chronology
A Couple of Song and Dance Men (1975)	They Can't Take These Away from Me (1976)

They Can't Take These Away from Me is a 1976 studio album by Fred Astaire recorded in London.

This was Astaire's last solo studio album, and the second of the three albums he recorded for Ken Barnes and United Artists Records.

== Track listing ==
1. "Top Hat, White Tie and Tails" (Irving Berlin)
2. "A Fine Romance" (Jerome Kern, Dorothy Fields)
3. "Cheek to Cheek" (Berlin)
4. "I Wanna Be a Dancin' Man" (Harry Warren, Johnny Mercer)
5. "They Can't Take That Away From Me" (George Gershwin, Ira Gershwin)
6. "One for My Baby (and One More for the Road)" (Harold Arlen, Mercer)
7. "Night and Day" (Cole Porter)
8. "Something's Gotta Give" (Mercer)
9. "A Foggy Day" (G. Gershwin, I. Gershwin)
10. "Isn't This a Lovely Day?" (Berlin)
11. "They All Laughed" (G. Gershwin, I. Gershwin)
12. "That's Entertainment" (Arthur Schwartz, Howard Dietz)

== Personnel ==
- Fred Astaire - vocals
