= Feels Good, Feels Right =

Studio album by Bing Crosby
- Released: 1976
- Recorded: July 20–22, August 17, 1976
- Genre: Vocal
- Length: 37:16
- Label: Decca Records (SKL 5261)
- Producer: Kevin Daly

Bing Crosby chronology
Bing Crosby Live at the London Palladium (1976)	Feels Good, Feels Right (1976)	Beautiful Memories (1977)

Feels Good, Feels Right is the forty-second solo studio album by American singer and actor Bing Crosby for Decca Records during four morning sessions in 1976 at Decca Studio No.3, Broadhurst Gardens, London. He was accompanied by Alan Cohen and his Orchestra. Cohen also did all the orchestral arrangements.

All of the tracks recorded in July were issued on the LP with the addition of "What’s New?" recorded on August 17. The other three tracks recorded on August 17 were issued for the first time on a Decca double album called “Bing – 1931” and “Bing – 1975-76”

The expanded album was first issued on CD by London Records in 1988 as No. 820 586-2.

== Reception ==
Billboard was not impressed saying: “The spirit’s willing, but Bing’s tired pipes aren’t what they once were despite his choice of nine splendid standards and three more recent tunes recorded last summer in London. One must overlook faulty intonation, an inability to sustain notes and an overall feeling of fatigue in this program produced by Kevin Daly and with orchestra conducted by Alan Cohen. For Crosby filberts, however, the LP will hit the mark."

Bert Bishop, writing for BING magazine felt that the album was "...a superb surprise bonus that keeps us reeling in amazement at the resurgence of our new, top-form, Bing. Yes, let's not lose sight of the fact that Bing is singing better than he was, and this LP is as good an example as any to prove the point". Bishop described the orchestrations as "...mostly traditional without losing sight of the contemporary big band sound and there’s no doubt that the modern recording techniques do full justice to every member of the orchestra", and concluded by writing that "In several recent recordings Bing has given us verses which must be quite new to many listeners and happily, that’s a prominent feature of the presentation of the ballads to which Bing brings his unique vocal nuances on this LP."

== Track listing ==
Side One

No.	Title	Writer(s)	Length
1.	"Feels Good, Feels Right"	Ken Welch, Mitzi Welch	3:26
2.	"Once in a While"	Michael Edwards, Bud Green	3:02
3.	"As Time Goes By"	Herman Hupfeld	3:22
4.	"Old Fashioned Love"	James P. Johnson, Cecil Mack	2:22
5.	"Time on My Hands"	Vincent Youmans, Mack Gordon, Harold Adamson	3:21
6.	"The Way We Were"	Marvin Hamlisch, Alan and Marilyn Bergman	3:01

Side Two

No.	Title	Writer(s)	Length
7.	"There's Nothing That I Haven't Sung About"	Lyn Duddy, Jerry Bresler	3:46
8.	"The Night Is Young and You're So Beautiful"	Dana Suesse, Irving Kahal, Billy Rose	3:03
9.	"Nevertheless"	Harry Ruby, Bert Kalmar	3:20
10.	"The Rose in Her Hair"	Harry Warren, Al Dubin	3:55
11.	"What’s New?"	Bob Haggart, Johnny Burke	4:22
12.	"When I Leave the World Behind"	Irving Berlin	2:51

Additional tracks on Decca double album

No.	Title	Writer(s)	Length
13.	"That Old Black Magic"	Harold Arlen, Johnny Mercer	2:36
14.	"I'm Getting Sentimental Over You"	George Bassman, Ned Washington	2:59
15.	"At Last"	Harry Warren, Mack Gordon	4:06
