= Tom Sawyer (album) =

Studio album by Bing Crosby
- Released: 1976
- Recorded: September 3, 5, 1975
- Genre: Reading
- Label: Argo Records (UK) (ZSW 561-3)
- Producer: Kevin Daly

Bing Crosby chronology
A Couple of Song and Dance Men (w/ Fred Astaire) (1975)	Tom Sawyer (1976)	At My Time of Life (1976)

Tom Sawyer is the fortieth solo studio album by American singer and actor Bing Crosby. It was a 3-LP box set containing a reading by Crosby of an abridged version of Mark Twain’s classic story The Adventures of Tom Sawyer. It was recorded for Argo Records (UK) on September 3 and 5, 1975 at Argo Studios, 115 Fulham Road, London.

Background music in the natural breaks in the story was composed by David T. Reilly and played by his father Tommy Reilly on the harmonica.

The album has never been issued on CD.

== Background ==
Executive producer Geoff Milne described the background in a magazine article after Crosby’s death. “Argo wanted to do something to commemorate the American Bicentennial celebrations, and it seemed a good idea to do Tom Sawyer - we all agreed that the only person who could relate the story was Bing Crosby…The recordings were done in two sessions, one lasting four hours and the other two and one-half hours...It was interesting to watch him in the studios. He was on his feet throughout the sessions. And he didn’t just read Tom Sawyer, he was actually acting the parts. His voice took on different tones and characters. He put a lot into it and I believe that it comes across in the records.”

Most of the sound effects on the album were done by Geoff Milne himself – the sound in the cave for instance was achieved by recording a dripping tap in the Decca washroom and then doctoring the effect appropriately.

== Reception ==
Mary Postgate writing in the UK publication, the Gramophone liked the box set. "This abridged version of a well-loved story is one of the most enjoyable sets to have come my way in recent years. It was a master stroke to get Bing Crosby to read it, for the ‘Old Groaner’ has a devastatingly charming manner, compounded of a relaxed and sympathetic delivery and a lovely speaking voice. The vocal cords that kept him at the very top in music and musical films for so many years are just as velvety now...Crosby's masterly reading needs little help. Delicate, dry, humorous but never whimsical or condescending, he is one of the most delightful readers Argo has offered us. The quality of the sound is exceptionally fine. Highly recommended."

Crosby researcher and author Fred Reynolds summed the album up saying, "the exploits of Tom, living with his Aunt Polly in a small town on the Missouri, and his companion Huckleberry Finn are refreshingly recaptured in Crosby’s reading. . . . Bing’s expressive narrative and his dialect voicing of the characters enhance an impressive and entertaining story."

== Track listing ==
SIDE ONE

1. Tom Escapes from Aunt Polly
2. The new boy
3. Whitewash!
4. Becky Thatcher is admired
5. Huckleberry Finn
6. At School
7. Tom Meets Becky

SIDE TWO

1. An engagement
2. Tom and Huck in the graveyard
3. Muff Potter and Injun Joe
4. The murder
5. A solemn oath
6. Pain-killer!
7. Becky rejects Tom

SIDE THREE

1. Tom, Huck and Joe Harper run away
2. Jackson's Island
3. Supper and homesickness
4. Exploring the Island
5. Have the boys drowned?
6. The Storm
7. A Resurrection
8. Tom and Amy Lawrence
9. A blotted spelling book and a torn picture.

SIDE FOUR

1. Mr. Dobbins discovers the books
2. Muff Potter in jail
3. The Trial
4. Injun Joe escapes
5. Digging for Treasure
6. The haunted house
7. Injun Joe returns

SIDE FIVE

1. The Temperance Tavern
2. Injun Joe's 'Number Two'
3. The Picnic
4. McDougal's Cave
5. Huck saves the Widow Douglas
6. Tom and Becky are lost
7. At Church
8. The Searchers

SIDE SIX

1. In the cave
2. Injun Joe returns
3. The children are found
4. Tom and Huck explore the cave
5. The Treasure
6. A Party
7. Huck is introduced into society
