= Thomas Sawyer (footballer) =

British footballer

Personal information
- Date of birth: 1874
- Place of death: London England
- Position: Forward

Senior career*
Years	Team	Apps	(Gls)
1894–1895	Derby County	2	(0)
1901–1902	Chesterfield	9	(0)
1899–1901	Newton Heath	6	(0)
- * Club domestic league appearances and goals

Thomas Sawyer (1874 – unknown) was an English footballer who played as a forward.

He played for Derby County (2 appearances as an inside forward in 1894–95 season), Newton Heath (6 appearances as an outside right in 1899–1900 and 1900–01 seasons) and Chesterfield (9 appearances in 1901–02 season).
