= Peter Dacre =

British journalist (1925–2003)

- Born: 8 June 1925
- Died: 16 March 2003 (aged 77)
- Education: Batley Grammar School
- Occupation: Journalist
- Children: 5, including Paul Dacre
- Relatives: James Dacre (grandson); Dai Jenkins (stepfather)

Peter Dacre (8 June 1925 – 16 March 2003) was a journalist on the Sunday Express whose work included show business features. He was a former chairman of the London Press Club.

== Early life ==
Peter Dacre was born 8 June 1925 in Yorkshire, the son of a carpenter and joiner father who died in a building site accident when he was six. His mother later married the Welsh international rugby player Dai Jenkins. He was educated at Batley Grammar School.

== Career ==
Dacre's first job was at the Doncaster Gazette, shortly after leaving school at the age of 16. According to Michael White in The Guardian, Dacre spent World War II writing show business journalism. His obituary in The Times reports him as writing for the News Review at the age of 19, and his obituary in The Daily Telegraph confirms that he worked on the News Review around that time. He worked with the Sunday Express for over forty years, and was the first English journalist to interview Elvis Presley.

== Personal life ==
Dacre was the father of the British journalists Nigel and Paul from his first marriage to Joan Hill. Later, in September 1979, Dacre married Ann Elizabeth Jarvis; both of his wives survived him.
