= Pete Moore (composer) =

British composer and arranger (1924–2013)

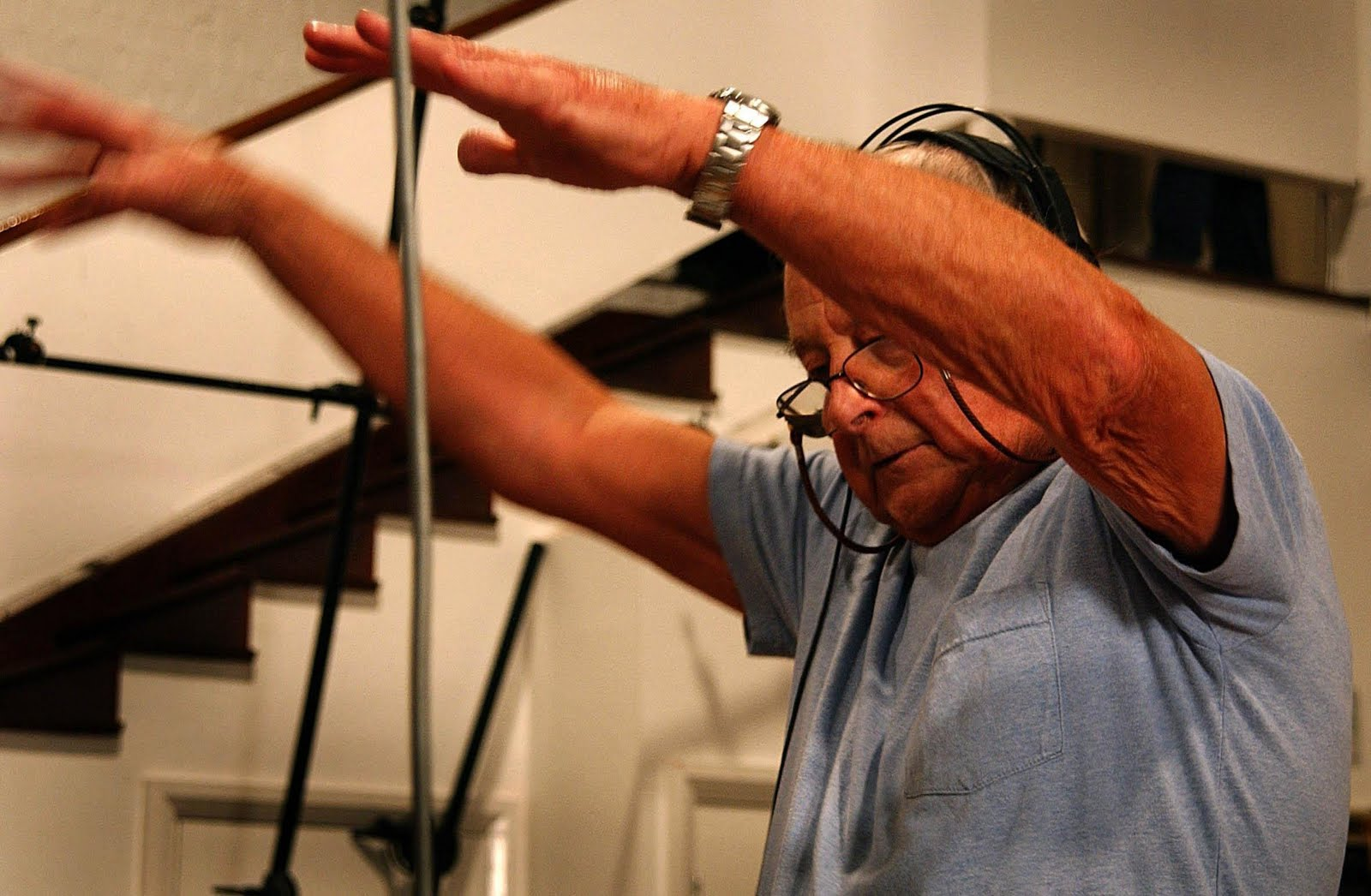
- Pete Moore conducting

Background information
- Also known as: Peter Moore
- Born: Pete Moore; 20 August 1924; Essex, England, UK
- Died: 1 December 2013 (aged 89) Acton, London, England
- Occupations: Composer, songwriter, music arranger
- Instrument: Piano
- Years active: 1958–2007

Pete Moore (20 August 1924 – 1 December 2013) was a British composer and arranger for a string of famous artists from the 1950s onwards.

== Early life ==
Born in Essex, England, Moore studied composition and arranging privately for approximately ten years with three teachers. These were Alfred Nieman (who was on the staff at the Guildhall School of Music, London), Henry Geehl and a certain "Dr. Cook" who was probably another staff member at one of the London music colleges.

== Career ==
His first job was playing piano in a pub. In 1949 he joined Teddy Foster's band, and then played with Ken Macintosh, Vic Lewis, Frank Cordell and Norrie Paramor. By 1958, he worked with such greats as Bing Crosby, Fred Astaire, Johnny Mercer, Gene Kelly, Peggy Lee, Frankie Laine, Connie Francis and Peter Sellers, amongst others, on all manner of broadcasts and recordings. He frequently collaborated with record producer Ken Barnes.

In the 1960s and the 1970s he made several easy listening records under his name or the name of Pete Moore and His Orchestra, usually recording covers of the pop hits of the day. He recorded for Pye Records and Rediffusion.

As a composer, he wrote themes for many TV commercials, including such famous brands as Coca-Cola and Lux Toilet Soap, in addition to numerous songs recorded by such artists as Crosby, Lee, Laine and Astaire. However, it is his composition "Asteroid" – the famous theme for Pearl & Dean's cinema advertisements – that remains his most familiar and most successful composition. Apart from being heard every day on cinema screens in the UK, it is constantly featured around the world in commercials and documentaries. It has also been sampled by modern-day pop artists and enjoyed chart success on more than one occasion. Pearl & Dean's signature tune is one of the most famous tracks played in British movie houses.

The Pearl & Dean anthem "Asteroid" is just 28 seconds long. The original screen titles featured graphics intended to emulate advertising panels flashing past as if the viewer was being sucked into the very screen. By the early 1990s, commercials and trailers were given the full stereo treatment, but the original "Asteroid" was only ever produced purely as a mono track. Remarkably, not only was the original composer/producer tracked down, but Moore was also able to locate two of the three original male singers who could still replicate their vocal parts three decades on.

In 1995, Goldbug (fronted by ex-Beatmasters man, Richard Walmsley) sampled the Pearl & Dean anthem and made No. 2 in the UK Singles Chart with their version of "Whole Lotta Love". A new 2mins 10secs digital version was recorded at the Abbey Road Studios by Moore and a 30-piece orchestra.

In retirement, Moore would travel by motorcycle from his home in Ealing to Waterloo each Saturday to assist in directing the famous Morley College Jazz Orchestra. He would bring his own handwritten transcriptions of modern big band repertoire, most often by Rob McConnell. Moore remarked in 2003, "Many people in the UK music profession have accused me of writing music for the future, and well ahead of its time. Having regard to the longevity of this piece I can only thoroughly agree with that sentiment!"

Ken Barnes gave Moore the following appraisal: "A quiet, soft-spoken and unassuming man, cockney-raised and academy-trained, Pete Moore usually declined to do interviews because he was always 'too busy.' In fact, it would seem that he never actively sought work, it just came to him. Which is why he was often referred to as 'The Invisible Genius.' As a person and as a musician, he was liked and admired by everyone who knew him. While he may not be a household name, Pete Moore's music remains alive and well. As it has for the past half-century."

=== Achievements ===
Throughout his career Pete Moore:

- Released 5 albums and 1 single
- Appeared on 5 albums, 15 compilations and 1 mix
- And was credited for 232 contributions, including the above mentioned and others such as The Golden Orchestra And Chorus – Willy Wonka And The Chocolate Factory And Other Sweet Songs

== Personal life ==
He married Barbara Moore (composer) in May 1954 but they divorced soon after the birth of their only child Lindsey. Afterwards, Moore lived in Middlesex and remarried. There were two daughters and a son. He died in London on 1 December 2013, aged 89.
