= Ken Barnes (writer) =

British writer (1933–2015)

- Born: Kenneth Valentine Barnes; 14 February 1933; Middlesbrough
- Died: 4 August 2015 (aged 82)
- Occupations: Writer, record producer, broadcaster, musicologist, film historian, film maker, songwriter and music publisher

Kenneth Valentine Barnes (14 February 1933 – 4 August 2015) was a British writer, record producer, broadcaster, musicologist, film historian, film maker, songwriter and music publisher.

Born in Middlesbrough, Barnes was educated in Redcar, and did his National Service in the Royal Corps of Signals. He trained as a draughtsman after leaving the army, but his interest in jazz, swing and the Great American Songbook led him to London in the 1960s, where he worked in marketing for Polydor and Decca Records before becoming a record producer.

In the 1970s, Barnes worked with Bing Crosby, Peter Sellers, Frankie Laine, Peggy Lee and Fred Astaire. In 1974, he convinced Johnny Mercer to record a two-disc collection of Mercer singing Mercer, with Johnny selecting his own favourites. These were the last recordings made by Mercer before his death in 1976.

Barnes also published several books, contributed liner notes for reissue albums, and wrote comedy scripts for BBC TV. For BBC Radio and TV, he wrote over 90 scripts, as well as special material for Parkinson. He also wrote for comedians including Roy Hudd and Les Dawson. In America, Barnes wrote special material for Crosby, Fred Astaire, Gene Kelly and Peter Sellers, amongst others.

Barnes was the founder and CEO of The Laureate Company, a music and movie restoration company. He wrote and delivered the DVD audio commentary on Citizen Kane (1941) and Holiday Inn (1942), starring Astaire and Crosby. The DVD also featured a supplementary documentary, A Couple of Song and Dance Men, in which he appears with Astaire's daughter, Ava Astaire-MacKenzie.

Barnes died in 2015, aged 82, after a long battle with diabetes. He was married to Anne.

== Works ==
- Sinatra and the great song stylists (Ian Allan: 1972) ISBN 0-7110-0400-5.
- 20 Years of Pop (Kenneth Mason: 1974) ISBN 0-85937-024-0.
- The Crosby Years, by Ken Barnes (New York: St. Martins, 1980) (London: Elm Tree Books, 1980) ISBN 0-312-17663-5.
- Anatomy of a Classic written, produced & directed by Ken Barnes (Film: Universal Home Video).
- A Couple of Song and Dance Men written, produced and directed by Ken Barnes (Film: Universal Home Video).
- Johnny Mercer - The Dream's On Me written by Ken Barnes, executive producer: Clint Eastwood, director: Bruce Ricker (TCM/Warner Home Video). Emmy nomination 2010: "Best Non Fiction Special".
- The Sea Dogs. Novel by Ken Barnes (SBPRA: 2014) ISBN 978-1-62857-589-7.

=== Productions ===
- Roy Castle – Songs For A Rainy Day (1966)
- The Roundtable – Spinning Wheel (1969)
- The Roundtable – Saturday Gigue (1969)
- The Indo-British Ensemble – Curried Jazz (1969)
- Mark Murphy – This Must Be Earth (1969)
- Sandra King (2) – Warm And Swinging - The Big Hits Of Henry Mancini (1970)
- The Harry Roche Constellation – Spindrift (1971)
- Hawaii Five-O – 3 Million Tonnes (1972)
- The Harry Roche Constellation – Spiral (1973)
- The Harry Roche Constellation – Sometimes (1973)
- Johnny Mercer With The Harry Roche Constellation – Sings The Songs Of Johnny Mercer (1974)
- The Boston Barbers – Golden Hour Of Ragtime Hits And Barbershop Ballads (1974)
- Johnny Mercer With The Pete Moore Orchestra – Singer-Songwriter (1974)
- Bing Crosby – That's What Life Is All About (1975)
- Fred Astaire – Sauce Lloron (1975)
- Bing Crosby – At My Time Of Life (1976)
- Slim Whitman – Red River Valley (1976)
- Fred Astaire – The Golden Age Of Fred Astaire (1976)
- Fred Astaire – Attitude Dancing (1976)
- Bing Crosby & Fred Astaire – A Couple Of Song & Dance Men (1976)
- Fred Astaire – Wonderful Baby (1976)
- Bing Crosby – When A Child Is Born (1976)
- Slim Whitman – Cara Mia (1976)
- Slim Whitman – Una Paloma Blanca (1976)
- Bing Crosby – Beautiful Memories (1977)
- Bing Crosby – Beautiful Memories / Deja Vu (1977)
- Peggy Lee – Live In London (1977)
- Frankie Laine – 20 Memories In Gold (1977)
- Henry Mancini – Revenge Of The Pink Panther (Original Motion Picture Soundtrack) (1978)
