= Fred Astaire discography =

The following is the discography of American dancer and singer Fred Astaire.

== Albums ==
The release years are stated accordingly to The Encyclopedia of Popular Music by Colin Larkin.

=== Studio albums ===
Title	Album details	Peak chart positions
Title	Album details	US
Music for Tap Dancing	Released: 1952; Label: Capitol Records; Formats: 10-inch LP	
The Astaire Story (#1–#4)	Released: 1953; Label: Mercury Records / Clef Records; Formats:	
Cavalcade of Dance	Released: 1955; Label: Coral Records; Formats:	
Mr. Top Hat	Released: 1956; Label: Verve Records; Formats:	
An Evening with Fred Astaire	Released: 1958 (promo); Label: Chrysler Corporation; Formats:	
Easy to Dance With	Released: 1958 or 1959; Label: Verve Records; Formats:	
Now Fred Astaire	Released: 1959; Label: Kapp Records; Formats:	
Another Evening with Fred Astaire	Released: 1959 (promo); Label: Chrysler Corp. / Capitol Records; Formats:	
Astaire Time	Released: 1960 (promo); Label: Chrysler Corporation; Formats:	
Three Evenings with Fred Astaire	Released: 1962; Label: Choreo Records; Formats:	
Nothing Thrilled Us Half as Much	Released: 1955 or 1964; Label: Epic Records; Formats:	
Attitude Dancing	Released: 1975 or early 1976; Label: United Artists Records (UAS 29885 [UK], UA-LA580-G [US]); Formats:	
A Couple of Song and Dance Men (with Bing Crosby)	Released: 1975 or early 1976; Label: United Artists Records (UAS 29888 [UK], UA-LA588-G [US]); Formats:	
They Can't Take These Away from Me	Released: 1976; Label: United Artists Records (UAS 29941); Formats:	
Fred Astaire at MGM	Released: 1997; Label: Rhino Records / Turner; Formats:	

=== Soundtrack albums ===
Title	Album details	Peak chart positions	Certifications
Title	Album details	US	Certifications
Song Hits from Holiday Inn (with Bing Crosby)	Released: 1942; Label: Decca Records; Formats:		
You Were Never Lovelier (w/ John Scott Trotter and his orchestra)	Released: 1942; Label: Decca Records; Formats: 3×10-inch, 78 rpm		
Blue Skies (with Bing Crosby)	Released: 1946; Label: Decca Records; Formats:		
The Barkleys of Broadway (with Ginger Rogers)	Released: 1949; Label: MGM Records; Formats: 2×10-inch, 78 rpm		
Easter Parade	Released: 1949; Label: MGM Records; Formats:		
Three Little Words	Released: 1950; Label: MGM Records; Formats:		
Royal Wedding (with Jane Powell)	Released: 1951; Label: MGM Records; Formats: 4×10-inch (78 rpm), 4×EP (45 rpm), 10-inch LP (33 rpm)		
The Belle of New York	Released: 1952; Label: MGM Records; Formats: 4×10-inch (78 rpm), 4×EP (45 rpm), 10-inch LP (33 rpm)		
The Band Wagon (with Nanette Fabray)	Released: 1953; Label: MGM Records; Formats:		
Funny Face	Released: 1957; Label: Verve Records; Formats:		
Finian's Rainbow	Released: 1968; Label: Warner Bros. Records; Formats:		
Santa Claus Is Comin' to Town	Released: 1970; Label: MGM Records; Formats:		
'S Wonderful, 'S Marvelous, 'S Gershwin	Released: 1972; Label: Daybreak Records; Formats:		
That's Entertainment	Released: 1974; Label: MCA Records; Formats:		

=== Compilation albums ===
Title	Album details	Peak chart positions
Title	Album details	US
Shall We Dance (with Johnny Green and his orchestra)	Released: 1937 (Japan); Label: Lucky; Formats: 3×10-inch, 78 rpm	
The Best of Fred Astaire	Released: 1955; Label: Epic Records; Formats:	
Fred Astaire	Released: 1959; Label: Lion Records; Formats:	
Starring Fred Astaire	Released: 1973; Label: Columbia Records; Formats:	
The Special Magic of Fred Astaire	Released: 1974; Label: Verve Records; Formats:	
Easy to Dance With	Released: 1975; Label: MCA Records; Formats:	

- Crazy Feet (Living Era, 1983)
- Fred Astaire Collection (Deja Vu, 1985)
- An Evening With (Nostalgia/Mainline, 1987)
- Easy to Dance With (MCA, 1987)
- Starring Fred Astaire (Avan-Guard, 1987)
- Top Hat, White Tie and Tails (Saville/Conifer, 1987)
- Astairable Fred (DRG, 1988)
- Cheek to Cheek (Compact Selection, 1988)
- Puttin' On the Ritz (Nostalgia/Mainline, 1988)
- The Fred Astaire and Ginger Rogers Story (Deja Vu, 1989)
- Top Hat: Hits from Hollywood (Sony, 1994 )
- Steppin Out: Fred Astaire at MGM (Sony, 1994)
- The Best of Fred Astaire: 18 Timeless Recordings (Music Club, 1995)

== Singles ==
- "Oh Gee! Oh Gosh!" / "The Whichness Of The Whatness": (Fred and Adele Astaire, His Master's Voice UK 1719, October 1923)
- "Fascinating Rhythm" / "The Half of It Dearie, Blues" (Fred and Adele Astaire, Columbia UK 3669, June 1926)
- "Hang On To Me" / "I’d Rather Charleston" (Fred and Adele Astaire, Columbia 3970 UK, 1926)
- "Swiss Miss" (Fred and Adele Astaire) / "So Am I" (Adele Astaire and George Vollaire, Columbia UK 3979, 1926)
- "Funny Face" / "The Babbitt and the Bromide" (Fred and Adele Astaire, Columbia 5174 UK, 1929)
- "Puttin' On the Ritz" / "Crazy Feet" (Columbia UK 96, May 1930)
- "Night And Day / "I've Got You on My Mind" (Victor 24193, 1932)
- "Flying Down to Rio" / "Music Makes Me" (Columbia UK 1329, 1934)
- "Cheek To Cheek" / "No Strings" (Brunswick 7486, 1935)
- "Isn't This a Lovely Day?" / "Top Hat, White Tie and Tails" (Brunswick 7487, 1935)
- "The Piccolino" / "Toddlin' Along with You" (Brunswick 7488, 1935)
- "Let Yourself Go" / "Let's Face the Music and Dance" (Brunswick 7608, 1936)
- "I'm Putting All My Eggs in One Basket" / "We Saw the Sea" (Brunswick 7609, 1936)
- "I'd Rather Lead a Band" / "I'm Building Up to an Awful Letdown" (Brunswick 7610, 1936)
- "A Fine Romance" / "Bojangles of Harlem" (Brunswick 7716, 1936)
- "The Way You Look Tonight" / "Pick Yourself Up" (Brunswick 7717, 1936)
- "Never Gonna Dance" / "Bojangles of Harlem" (Brunswick 7718, 1936)
- "They Can't Take That Away from Me" / "Beginner's Luck" (Brunswick 7855, 1937)
- "Let's Call The Whole Thing Off" / "Shall We Dance" (Brunswick 7857, 1937)
- "Things Are Looking Up" / "Nice Work if You Can Get It" (Brunswick 7983, 1937)
- "Change Partners" / "I Used To Be Color Blind" (Brunswick 8189, 1938)
- "So Near And Yet So Far" / "Since I Kissed My Baby Goodbye" (Decca 18187, 1941)
- "Dream Dancing" / "The Wedding Cake Walk" (Decca 18188, 1941)
- "I'm Old Fashioned" / "Wedding In The Spring" (Decca 18469, 1943)
