= Funny Face (disambiguation) =

Funny Face is a 1957 musical film.

Funny Face or Funny Faces may also refer to:

== Film and television ==
- Funny Face (1932 film), a Flip the Frog cartoon
- Funny Face (2020 film), a 2020 American drama film starring Cosmo Jarvis
- Funny Face (TV series), a 1971 American TV sitcom starring Sandy Duncan
- "Funny Face", an episode of Ollie & Scoops
- "Funny Faces", an episode of Zoboomafoo

== Music ==
- "Funny Face" (1927 song), title song of the musical Funny Face
- Funny Face (soundtrack), soundtrack to the 1957 film
- "Funny Face" (Donna Fargo song), 1972
- "Funny Face", a song by U2 from The Million Dollar Hotel soundtrack
- "Funny Face", a 1981 song by Sparks from Whomp That Sucker
- "Funny Face", a song by the Red Hot Chili Peppers featured as a b-side on the "Snow (Hey Oh)" single
- "Funny Face", a song by Dave Davies from "Susannah's Still Alive"

== Other ==
- Steeplechase Face, amusement park mascot
- Funny Face (drink mix)
- Funny Face (comedian), stage name of Benson Nana Yaw Oduro Boateng
- Funny Face (musical), a 1927 musical by George and Ira Gershwin

== See also ==
- Gurn or making a face
- High School! Kimengumi (English: High School! Funny-face Club)
- "Hengao" (変顔) (English: Funny Face), episode of Karakai Jozu no Takagi-san
- The Funny Face of the Godfather, 1973 film
