= Funny Face (soundtrack) =

Soundtrack to the 1957 film of the same name

Soundtrack album by Fred Astaire, Kay Thompson, Audrey Hepburn
- Released: 1957
- Recorded: March / April 1956 in Hollywood
- Genre: Jazz, soundtrack
- Length: 41:48
- Label: Verve
- Producer: Norman Granz

Fred Astaire chronology
The Band Wagon (1953)	Funny Face (1957)	Easy to Dance With (1959)

Funny Face is the soundtrack to the 1957 film of the same name, with music by George Gershwin, from his Broadway musical Funny Face (1927), and new songs composed by the film's producer Roger Edens, .

The film was Astaire's first with Audrey Hepburn, who played his love interest, Funny Face bears little relation to the George and Ira Gershwin musical of the same name.

== Reception ==
Professional ratings
Review scores
Source	Rating
Allmusic	3.5/5 stars

The Allmusic review by William Ruhlmann awarded the album 3.5 stars and described Eden's music as "mediocre", adding that "more objectionably...(Eden) rewrites many of Ira Gershwin's lyrics and even some of George Gershwin's music". Ruhlmann praises Astaire as "typically effective"

== Track listing ==
#	Title	Performer (s)	Length
A-1a	Prelude ('S Wonderful / Funny Face)	Fred Astaire, Chorus	1:35
A-1b	Think Pink!	Kay Thompson, Chorus	2:15
A-2	How Long Has This Been Going On?	Audrey Hepburn	5:05
A-3	How Long Has This Been Going On? (instrumental reprise)	Adolph Deutsch's Orchestra	1:05
A-4	Funny Face	Fred Astaire	3:43
A-5	Bonjour, Paris!	Fred Astaire, Kay Thompson, Audrey Hepburn	6:04
B-1	Clap Yo' Hands	Kay Thompson, Fred Astaire	3:32
B-2	He Loves, She Loves	Fred Astaire	5:00
B-3	Bonjour, Paris! (instrumental reprise)	Adolph Deutsch's Orchestra	1:00
B-4	On How to Be Lovely	Audrey Hepburn, Kay Thompson	2:41
B-5	Basal Metabolism (How Long Has This Been Going On? / Funny Face)	Adolph Deutsch's Orchestra	2:54
B-6	Let's Kiss and Make Up	Fred Astaire	4:48
B-7	'S Wonderful	Fred Astaire, Audrey Hepburn	2:06

In 2017, the 60th anniversary of the film, Verve reissued the album: resequenced the tracks to respect the order in which the songs where heard on the screen, restored the edited songs and added eight bonus tracks.

#	Title	Performer (s)	Length
1	Main Titles: Funny Face / 'S Wonderful	Fred Astaire / Chorus	1:34
2	Think Pink!	Kay Thompson, Chorus	2:15
3	How Long Has This Been Going On?	Audrey Hepburn	5:06
4	How Long Has This Been Going On? (instrumental reprise)	Adolph Deutsch's Orchestra	1:06
5	Funny Face	Fred Astaire	3:45
6	Bonjour, Paris!	Fred Astaire, Kay Thompson, Audrey Hepburn, Chorus	6:05
7	Basal Metabolism (How Long Has This Been Going On? / Funny Face)	Adolph Deutsch's Orchestra	2:54
8	Let's Kiss and Make Up	Fred Astaire	4:48
9	He Loves, She Loves	Fred Astaire	5:01
10	On How to Be Lovely	Audrey Hepburn, Kay Thompson	2:41
11	Bonjour, Paris! (instrumental reprise)	Adolph Deutsch's Orchestra	1:00
12	Clap Yo' Hands	Kay Thompson, Fred Astaire	3:32
13	'S Wonderful	Fred Astaire, Audrey Hepburn	2:08
14	Funny Face (Alternate)	Fred Astaire	3:28
15	Think Pink! (Alternate)	Kay Thompson, Chorus	6:32
16	How Long Has This Been Going On? (Alternate)	Audrey Hepburn	4:30
17	Bonjour, Paris! (Alternate)	Fred Astaire, Kay Thompson, Audrey Hepburn, Chorus	6:05
18	He Loves, She Loves (Alternate)	Fred Astaire	4:57
19	On How to Be Lovely (Alternate)	Audrey Hepburn, Kay Thompson	2:30
20	Clap Yo' Hands (Alternate)	Kay Thompson, Fred Astaire	4:08
21	'S Wonderful (Alternate)	Fred Astaire, Audrey Hepburn	2:21
			76:00

All music composed by George Gershwin, and all lyrics written by Ira Gershwin, with the exception of Think Pink!, Bonjour, Paris! and On How to Be Lovely by Roger Edens (music) and Leonard Gershe (lyrics).

== Personnel ==
=== Performance ===
- Fred Astaire - vocals
- Kay Thompson - vocals
- Audrey Hepburn - vocals

=== Other personnel ===
- George Gershwin - composer: A-1a, A-2, A-3, A-4, B-1, B-2, B-5, B,6, B7
- Ira Gershwin - lyricist: A-1a, A-2, A-3, A-4, B-1, B-2, B-5, B,6, B7
- Roger Edens - composer: A-2b, A-5, B-3, B-4
- Leonard Gershe - lyricist: A-2b, A-5, B-3, B-4
- Adolph Deutsch - conductor
- Van Cleave - arranger
- Alexander Courage - arranger
- Skip Martin - arranger
- Conrad Salinger - arranger
- Norman Granz - album producer
- Richard Avedon - front and back-cover photographs of Audrey Hepburn
- Bill Avery - photographs of Fred Astaire
