= List of Billboard number-one albums of 1950 =

These are the Billboard magazine number-one albums for each week in 1950.

== Chart history through July 15 ==
Issue date	Album	Artist(s)	Label	Ref.
January 7	Merry Christmas	Bing Crosby	Decca	
January 14	South Pacific	Mary Martin and Ezio Pinza	Columbia	
January 21	South Pacific	Mary Martin and Ezio Pinza	Columbia	
January 28	South Pacific	Mary Martin and Ezio Pinza	Columbia	
February 4	South Pacific	Mary Martin and Ezio Pinza	Columbia	
February 11	South Pacific	Mary Martin and Ezio Pinza	Columbia	
February 18	South Pacific	Mary Martin and Ezio Pinza	Columbia	
February 25	South Pacific	Mary Martin and Ezio Pinza	Columbia	
March 4	South Pacific	Mary Martin and Ezio Pinza	Columbia	
March 11	South Pacific	Mary Martin and Ezio Pinza	Columbia	
March 18	South Pacific	Mary Martin and Ezio Pinza	Columbia	
March 25	South Pacific	Mary Martin and Ezio Pinza	Columbia	
April 1	South Pacific	Mary Martin and Ezio Pinza	Columbia	
April 8	South Pacific	Mary Martin and Ezio Pinza	Columbia	
April 15	South Pacific	Mary Martin and Ezio Pinza	Columbia	
April 22	South Pacific	Mary Martin and Ezio Pinza	Columbia	
April 29	South Pacific	Mary Martin and Ezio Pinza	Columbia	
May 6	Cinderella	Ilene Woods and others (children's album)	RCA Victor	
May 13	Young Man with a Horn	Doris Day and Harry James	Columbia	
May 20 (Note: Multiple albums tied for the number one position.)	Young Man with a Horn	Doris Day and Harry James	Columbia	
May 20	Cinderella	Ilene Woods and others (children's album)	RCA Victor	
May 27	Young Man with a Horn	Doris Day and Harry James	Columbia	
June 3	South Pacific	Mary Martin and Ezio Pinza	Columbia	
June 10	South Pacific	Mary Martin and Ezio Pinza	Columbia	
June 17	South Pacific	Mary Martin and Ezio Pinza	Columbia	
June 24	South Pacific	Mary Martin and Ezio Pinza	Columbia	
July 1	South Pacific	Mary Martin and Ezio Pinza	Columbia	
July 8	South Pacific	Mary Martin and Ezio Pinza	Columbia	
July 15	Young Man with a Horn	Doris Day and Harry James	Columbia	

== Chart history July 22 to end of year ==
Chart history
Issue date	33 1/3 R.P.M.			45 R.P.M.			Ref.
Issue date	Album	Artist(s)	Label	Album	Artist(s)	Label	Ref.
July 22	South Pacific	Mary Martin & Ezio Pinza	Columbia	Ralph Flanagan Plays Rodgers and Hammerstein (Note: Also known as Ralph Flanagan Plays Rodgers & Hammerstein II for Dancing and Rodgers and Hammerstein II for Dancing.)	Ralph Flanagan	RCA Victor	
July 29	Young Man with a Horn	Doris Day & Harry James	Columbia	Ralph Flanagan Plays Rodgers and Hammerstein	Ralph Flanagan	RCA Victor	
August 5	Young Man with a Horn	Doris Day & Harry James	Columbia	Ralph Flanagan Plays Rodgers and Hammerstein	Ralph Flanagan	RCA Victor	
August 12	South Pacific	Mary Martin and Ezio Pinza	Columbia	Annie Get Your Gun	Betty Hutton and Howard Keel	MGM	
August 19	South Pacific	Mary Martin and Ezio Pinza	Columbia	Annie Get Your Gun	Betty Hutton and Howard Keel	MGM	
August 26	Young Man with a Horn	Doris Day & Harry James	Columbia	Annie Get Your Gun	Betty Hutton and Howard Keel	MGM	
September 2	Young Man with a Horn	Doris Day & Harry James	Columbia	Annie Get Your Gun	Betty Hutton and Howard Keel	MGM	
September 9	Young Man with a Horn	Doris Day & Harry James	Columbia	Annie Get Your Gun	Betty Hutton and Howard Keel	MGM	
September 16	Young Man with a Horn	Doris Day & Harry James	Columbia	Annie Get Your Gun	Betty Hutton and Howard Keel	MGM	
September 23	Young Man with a Horn	Doris Day & Harry James	Columbia	Annie Get Your Gun	Betty Hutton and Howard Keel	MGM	
September 30	Young Man with a Horn	Doris Day & Harry James	Columbia	Three Little Words	Soundtrack	MGM	
October 7	Three Little Words	Soundtrack	MGM	Three Little Words	Soundtrack	MGM	
October 14	Three Little Words	Soundtrack	MGM	Three Little Words	Soundtrack	MGM	
October 21	Three Little Words	Soundtrack	MGM	Three Little Words	Soundtrack	MGM	
October 28	Three Little Words	Soundtrack	MGM	Three Little Words	Soundtrack	MGM	
November 4	Three Little Words	Soundtrack	MGM	Three Little Words	Soundtrack	MGM	
November 11	Three Little Words	Soundtrack	MGM	Annie Get Your Gun	Betty Hutton and Howard Keel	MGM	
November 18	Three Little Words	Soundtrack	MGM	Three Little Words	Soundtrack	MGM	
November 25	Three Little Words	Soundtrack	MGM	Three Little Words	Soundtrack	MGM	
December 2	Three Little Words	Soundtrack	MGM	Three Little Words	Soundtrack	MGM	
December 9	Three Little Words	Soundtrack	MGM	Three Little Words	Soundtrack	MGM	
December 16	Three Little Words	Soundtrack	MGM	Merry Christmas	Bing Crosby	Decca	
December 23	South Pacific	Mary Martin and Ezio Pinza	Columbia	Merry Christmas	Bing Crosby	Decca	
December 30	Merry Christmas	Bing Crosby	Decca	Merry Christmas	Bing Crosby	Decca	

== See also ==
- 1950 in music
- List of number-one albums (United States)
