= The Astaire Story =

Studio album by Fred Astaire
- Released: 1953
- Recorded: December 1952
- Genre: Vocal jazz
- Length: 134 minutes
- Label: Mercury, Clef
- Producer: Norman Granz

Fred Astaire chronology
The Belle of New York (1952)	The Astaire Story (1953)	The Band Wagon (1953)

LP 1 cover

LP 2 cover

LP 3 cover

LP 4 cover

3 LP re-issue
- (1978)

The Astaire Story is a 1953 album by the American artist Fred Astaire. The album was conceived of and produced by Norman Granz, the founder of Clef Records (and later Verve Records), who was also responsible for the Jazz at the Philharmonic concerts, at which all of the musicians on the album had performed.

== Content and reception ==
Professional ratings
Review scores
Source	Rating
AllMusic	4/5 stars
DownBeat	5/5 stars

The album's song selection provides an overview of Astaire's singing career although Astaire also demonstrates his tap dancing on three tracks and there is one informal instrumental jam session. Some later LP and CD re-issues add two versions of Oscar Peterson's instrumental "The Astaire Blues".

Oscar Peterson spoke warmly of the sessions that produced The Astaire Story in his autobiography, noting that vocally, Astaire was naturally attuned to jazz phrasing, and that Astaire enjoyed playing the drums at home. Astaire gave each of the musicians on the album a gold identification bracelet, inscribed "With thanks, Fred A". Ray Brown lost his bracelet, Alvin Stoller's was stolen, but Peterson wore his for the rest of his life.

The Astaire Story was selected for the Grammy Hall of Fame Award in 1999, which is a special Grammy award established in 1973 to honor recordings that are at least 25 years old, and that have "qualitative or historical significance."

DownBeat assigned the album 5 stars. Reviewer John McDonough wrote, "This is a wonderfully intimate, friendly, and unpretentious retrospective of a spectacular career . . . There is no gimmick here. Astaire simply sings a selection of tunes he’s been associated with over the years, setting aside plenty of time to let Peterson and company make their statements, and stepping in occasionally for some vigorous tapping . . . No one comes to mind who has introduced more lasting melodies into our musical heritage . . . Astaire's vocal style is light and relaxed, not unlike his dancing. He never pushes a lyric. In fact, he rarely even toys with it in the way Sinatra or Tormé will bend words and twist notes into coil springs of emotional tension. Astaire prefers to let lyrics speak for themselves with stylish simplicity".

== Release history ==
A deluxe four-LP box set was produced of The Astaire Story, in a strictly limited edition of 1,384 copies, each one hand-signed by Astaire and the artist David Stone Martin, who contributed original drawings and paintings to the album. In addition to the limited-edition boxed set, each of the four LPs was released individually, and the tracks were also issued on nine EPs. The complete session was later re-issued in a three-LP (1978) and a two-CD (1988) edition. Verve has also released several single-disc compilations of selected tracks from this 1952 session – Mr. Top Hat; The Irving Berlin Songbook; Steppin' Out: Astaire Sings. In the European Union, after the original recording's performers'/producers' rights expired, additional European releases appeared under different names, e.g. Jazz Time (Proper) 2003; Oscar Peterson and Fred Astaire: Complete Norman Granz Sessions (Jazz Factory) 2005.

== Track listing ==
=== LP 1 ===
Side A

1. "Isn't This a Lovely Day?" (Irving Berlin) – 4:26
2. "Puttin' on the Ritz" (Berlin) – 2:51
3. "I Used to Be Color Blind" (Berlin) – 4:14
4. "The Continental" (Con Conrad, Herb Magidson) – 3:28

Side B

1. "Let's Call the Whole Thing Off" (George Gershwin, Ira Gershwin) – 4:36
2. "Change Partners" (Berlin) – 3:13
3. "'S Wonderful" (G. Gershwin, I. Gershwin) – 2:56
4. "Lovely to Look At" (Dorothy Fields, Jerome Kern, Jimmy McHugh) – 3:26
5. "They All Laughed" (G. Gershwin, I. Gershwin) – 2:55

=== LP 2 ===
Side A

1. "Cheek to Cheek" (Berlin) – 5:39
2. "Steppin' Out with My Baby" (Berlin) – 2:22
3. "The Way You Look Tonight" (Fields, Kern) – 2:57
4. "I've Got My Eyes on You" (Cole Porter) – 2:57
5. "Dancing in the Dark" (Howard Dietz, Arthur Schwartz) – 4:45

Side B

1. "The Carioca" (Edward Eliscu, Gus Kahn, Vincent Youmans) – 4:48
2. "Nice Work If You Can Get It" (G. Gershwin, I. Gershwin) – 2:07
3. "New Sun in the Sky" (Dietz, Schwartz) – 2:27
4. "I Won't Dance" (Fields, Oscar Hammerstein II, Otto Harbach, Kern, McHugh) – 3:01
5. "Fast Dances (Ad Lib)" – 2:24

=== LP 3 ===
Side A

1. "Top Hat, White Tie and Tails" (Berlin) – 4:00
2. "No Strings (I'm Fancy Free)" (Berlin) – 2:54
3. "I Concentrate on You" (Porter) – 2:43
4. "I'm Putting all My Eggs in One Basket" (Berlin) – 2:54
5. "A Fine Romance" (Fields, Kern) – 3:43

Side B

1. "Night and Day" (Porter) – 5:22
2. "Fascinating Rhythm" (G. Gershwin, I. Gershwin) – 2:41
3. "I Love Louisa" (Dietz, Schwartz) – 2:40
4. "Slow Dances (Ad Lib)" – 2:55
5. "Medium Dances (Ad Lib)" – 2:01

=== LP 4 ===
Side A

1. "They Can't Take That Away from Me" (G. Gershwin, I. Gershwin) – 4:22
2. "You're Easy to Dance With" (Berlin) – 3:22
3. "A Needle in a Haystack" (Conrad, Magidson) – 2:22
4. "So Near and Yet So Far" (Porter) – 3:18
5. "A Foggy Day" (G. Gershwin, I. Gershwin) – 4:00

Side B

1. "Oh, Lady be Good!" (G. Gershwin, I. Gershwin) – 5:01
2. "I'm Building Up to an Awful Letdown" (Fred Astaire, Johnny Mercer) – 3:59
3. "Not My Girl" (Astaire, Desmond Carter, Van Phillips) – 3:37
4. "Jam Session for a Dancer" – 6:34

=== (instrumental) bonus tracks added to some later re-issues ===
- "The Astaire Blues" (version 1) (Peterson) – 12:03
- "The Astaire Blues" (version 2) a.k.a. "The Second Astaire Blues" (Peterson) – 7:52

== Personnel ==
Recorded at Radio Recorders, Hollywood, Los Angeles, California, December, 1952:

=== Performance ===
- Fred Astaire - vocals, tap
- Charlie Shavers - trumpet
- Flip Phillips - tenor saxophone
- Oscar Peterson – piano
- Barney Kessel - guitar
- Ray Brown - double bass
- Alvin Stoller – drums

=== Production ===
- Gjon Mili - photography
- Paul Nodler - photography
- David Stone Martin - cover art, drawings
- Lowell Frank - engineer, mixing
- Norman Granz - producer

== Notes / external links ==
- Mercury MGC 1001/4 (1953, 4LP boxed set)
  - Mercury MGC 1001 #1 (also Clef MGC 662)
  - Mercury MGC 1002 #2 (also Clef MGC 663)
  - Mercury MGC 1003 #3 (also Clef MGC 664)
  - Mercury MGC 1004 #4 (also Clef MGC 665)
- DRG DARC 3-1102 (1978, 3 LP re-issue, complete + 2 bonus tracks)
- Verve 835 649 (1988, 2 CD re-issue, complete)
