= Cinderella (1950 album) =

Studio album by Ilene Woods as Cinderella
- Released: 1950
- Label: RCA Victor

Cinderella is a storybook album adapted from the 1950 Walt Disney animated film Cinderella.

Credited to "Ilene Woods as Cinderella" – and featuring colorful artwork with a read-along insert, – it was timed for release with the film and rose to No. 1 on the Billboard charts.

In addition to narration, the album contained music, including the film's songs: "A Dream Is a Wish Your Heart Makes", "The Cinderella Work Song", "Bibbidi-Bobbidi-Boo" ("The Magic Song"), and "So This Is Love".

== Release ==
It was released by RCA Victor and was available in two formats: 78 rpm (an album of two 10-inch 78-rpm phonograph records, cat. no. Y-399) and 45 rpm (an album of two 7-inch 45-rpm records, cat. no. WY-399).

== Critical reception ==
Professional ratings
Review scores
Source	Rating
Parents' Magazine	positive
Steinway Review of Permanent Music	positive

Parents' Magazine wrote: "The new album with its fascinating illustrations will be loved by children. [...] Good narration and pleasing musical background."

Steinway Review of Permanent Music called the album "a 'must' for children of all ages" and continued: "It's charming and delightful [...], complete with the talking and singing mice, all the tunes from the movie, and excellent narration." The magazine also noted that the story "printed on extra pages between the album covers", with "drawings illustrating the story", followed the "narration on records word-for-word, so that it [was] simple for the child to follow."

== Chart performance ==
The album spent two weeks at number one on Billboard's Pop Albums chart in the spring of 1950.

== Track listing ==
Set of two 10-inch 78-rpm records (RCA Victor Y-399)

Set of two 7-inch 45-rpm records (RCA Victor WY-399)

Side 1
No.	Title	Length
1.	"A Dream Is a Wish Your Heart Makes"

Side 2
No.	Title	Length
1.	"The Cinderella Work Song"

Side 3
No.	Title	Length
1.	"Bibbidi-Bobbidi-Boo" ("The Magic Song") / "So This Is Love"

Side 4
No.	Title	Length
1.	"A Dream Is a Wish Your Heart Makes"

== Charts ==
Chart (1950)	Peak position
US Billboard Children's Albums	1
US Billboard Pop Albums	1

== See also ==
- List of Billboard number-one albums of 1950
