= How Long Has This Been Going On? =

Song composed by George and Ira Gershwin

Song
- Written: George and Ira Gershwin
- Published: 1928
- Composer: George Gershwin
- Lyricist: Ira Gershwin

“How Long Has This Been Going On?” is a song composed by George Gershwin, with lyrics by Ira Gershwin, for the musical Funny Face in 1927.

== History ==
The song was published in 1927 by the New World Music Corporation (plate N.W. 59-4) with Smarty, the early title of Funny Face, on the cover. In the tryouts for the show, which opened in Philadelphia on 11 October 1927, it was a duet for the characters of Peter (Stanley Ridges) and Frankie (Adele Astaire).

According to Ira Gershwin in his book Lyrics on Several Occasions, after the premiere of Funny Face in Philadelphia he received a call from the then professional manager of Shapiro, Bernstein and Co. asking him to remove the song. When Gershwin asked why, the manager replied that the song “[d]oesn't mean anything ... Well, we've bought a song with the same title and we're about to publish it. Yours doesn't get you anywhere, so how about taking it out of the show?” The song was dropped, as Ira Gershwin wrote: “Well, he had his wish. A couple of weeks later on the road (either in Atlantic City or Washington) 'How Long...' was out, replaced by 'He Loves and She Loves' (not as good a song as the former, but one that managed to get over).” “He Loves and She Loves” remained in Funny Face throughout its Broadway run.

“How Long Has This Been Going On?” was included the next year in the musical Rosalie (1928), recast as a solo number and sung by Bobbe Arnst as Mary O'Brien. The lyrics used as first released by Gershwin started with the introductory verse: “As a tot, when I trotted in little velvet panties, / I was kissed by my sisters, my cousins, and my aunties. / Sad to tell, it was hell, an inferno worse than Dante's.” In the subsequent version of the lyrics as performed by Ella Fitzgerald ten years later, the lyrics of this introductory verse were changed to the melancholy reflections of a worker in evening “bazaars” reflecting on the differences between kisses for money and romantic kisses from someone with emotional ties, which had previously eluded her. She reflects with “salty tears” about the differences between the two types of kisses.

The introductory verse as performed by Fitzgerald was:

'Neath the stars, at bazaars
Often I've had to caress men
Five or ten, dollars then, I'd collect from all those yes-men
Don't be sad, I must add, that they meant no more than chess-men

Darling, can't you see?
'Twas for charity?
Though these lips have made slips, it was never really serious
Who'd have thought, I'd be brought to a state that's so delirious?

In the original Gershwin version of the song, somewhat more upbeat, it is sung by a young woman comparing kisses among family members and friends at holidays, to how different they turn out to be when experienced while expressing romantic affections; she is surprised to find that romantic kisses are very different. The two verses describe her previous negative experiences of kissing: first the childhood attentions of older female relatives, and second while working in a kissing booth. The two choruses describe the excitement of then experiencing a first romantic kiss, and regret at not having experienced it before: “I could cry salty tears; where have I been all these years? / Little wow, tell me now, how long has this been going on?”

Bing Crosby recorded the song in 1955 for use on his radio show and it was subsequently included in the box set The Bing Crosby CBS Radio Recordings (1954-56) issued by Mosaic Records (catalog MD7-245) in 2009. Audrey Hepburn sang it in the 1957 film Funny Face.

== Sources ==
- Gershwin, Ira (1959). Lyrics on Several Occasions (First ed.). New York: Knopf. OCLC 538209.
- Kimball, Robert (1993). The Complete Lyrics of Ira Gershwin (First ed.). New York: Alfred A. Knopf. ISBN 0-394-55651-8.
