= Ralph Flanagan Plays Rodgers and Hammerstein II for Dancing =

Ralph Flanagan Plays Rodgers & Hammerstein II for Dancing

Studio album by Ralph Flanagan
- Released: 1950
- Label: RCA Victor

Ralph Flanagan Plays Rodgers & Hammerstein II for Dancing (Note: Also known as Ralph Flanagan Plays Rodgers and Hammerstein and Rodgers and Hammerstein II for Dancing.) is an album by bandleader Ralph Flanagan, released in 1950 by RCA Victor.

== Release ==
The album was released in two formats: 78 rpm (a set of three phonograph records, cat. no. P 268) and 45 rpm (a set of three 7-inch records, cat. no. WP 268).

== Critical reception ==
Professional ratings
Review scores
Source	Rating
Billboard	90/100 ("tops")

Billboard reviewed the album in its issue from March 11, 1950, rating it 90 on a scale of 100 and writing: "This one's likely to rate tops with the teen-agers and college crowd. With Flanagan shaping up as the new idol of the young dance crowd [...], this grouping rates as nothing less than sure-fire."

== Chart performance ==
The album spent several weeks at number one on the 45-rpm half of Billboard's Pop Albums chart in July–August 1950.

== Track listing ==
Set of four 10-inch 78-rpm records (RCA Victor P 268)
Set of four 7-inch 45-rpm records (RCA Victor WP 268)

All tracks are written by Oscar Hammerstein II and Richard Rodgers.

Side 1
No.	Title	Note(s)	Length
1.	"Some Enchanted Evening" (from the musical production South Pacific)	Ralph Flanagan and his orchestra

Side 2
No.	Title	Note(s)	Length
1.	"People Will Say We're in Love" (from the musical production Oklahoma!)	Ralph Flanagan and his orchestra Vocal refrain by Harry Prime

Side 3
No.	Title	Note(s)	Length
1.	"The Surrey with the Fringe on Top" (from the musical production Oklahoma!)	Ralph Flanagan and his orchestra

Side 4
No.	Title	Note(s)	Length
1.	"It Might as Well Be Spring" (from the 20th Century-Fox film State Fair)	Ralph Flanagan and his orchestra

Side 5
No.	Title	Note(s)	Length
1.	"If I Loved You" (from the musical production Carousel)	Ralph Flanagan and his orchestra

Side 6
No.	Title	Note(s)	Length
1.	"Oh, What a Beautiful Mornin'" (from the musical production Oklahoma!)	Ralph Flanagan and his orchestra Vocal refrain by Harry Prime

== Charts ==
Chart (1950)	Peak position
US Billboard Pop Albums	3
US Billboard Pop Albums / Best-Selling 45 R.P.M.	1

== See also ==
- List of Billboard number-one albums of 1950
