= Funny Face (1927 song) =

Song
- Written: 1927
- Composer(s): George Gershwin
- Lyricist(s): Ira Gershwin

"Funny Face" is a 1927 song composed by George Gershwin, with lyrics by Ira Gershwin.

It was the title song of the stage musical Funny Face, where it was introduced by Fred Astaire, and his sister, Adele.

A 1957 film musical called Funny Face also featured the song, and also starred Fred Astaire, though the two had different stories. In the film, Fred Astaire's character was loosely based on the career of Richard Avedon, who provided a number of the photographs seen in the film, including its most famous single image: an intentionally overexposed close-up of Audrey Hepburn's face in which only her famous features—her eyes, her eyebrows, and her mouth—are visible. (This image is seen during the "Funny Face" musical number, which takes place in a darkroom).

Barbra Streisand performed several lines of this song in her "Medley" on her studio album Color Me Barbra (1966).

== Recordings ==
- Arden-Ohman Orchestra with Johnny Marvin, vocal - Victor 21114; Matrix BVE-41151 (rec. Dec 8, 1927)
- Whispering Jack Smith - HMV B2864 (rec. Sep 19, 1928)
- Fred Astaire and Adele Astaire - English Columbia EC 5174 (rec. Nov 26, 1928)
- Fred Astaire - Funny Face (soundtrack) (1957)
- Ella Fitzgerald - Ella Fitzgerald Sings the George and Ira Gershwin Songbook (1959)
- Joe Raposo - as the soundtrack of a film about monkeys on Sesame Street (1969)
