= He Loves and She Loves =

1927 song

"He Loves and She Loves" is a 1927 song composed by George Gershwin, with lyrics written by Ira Gershwin.

It replaced the song "How Long Has This Been Going On?" in the Broadway musical Funny Face. It was introduced by Adele Astaire and Allen Kearns. Fred Astaire sang it in the 1957 film of the same name.

== Notable recordings ==
- Tony Bennett - Steppin' Out (1993)
- Petula Clark - Lost in You (2013).
- Ella Fitzgerald - Ella Fitzgerald Sings the George and Ira Gershwin Songbook (1959)
- Stacey Kent - Let Yourself Go: Celebrating Fred Astaire (2000)
- Sarah Vaughan - Sarah Vaughan Sings George Gershwin (1958)

Fred Astaire sings the song to (and dances with) Audrey Hepburn in the 1957 film Funny Face.

An instrumental version is used as background music in the carriage ride set piece in the 1979 Woody Allen film Manhattan.
