= The Belle of New York (soundtrack) =

Soundtrack album
- Released: 1952
- Genre: Show tunes
- Label: MGM

Fred Astaire chronology
Royal Wedding (1951)	The Belle of New York (1952)	The Astaire Story (1953)

Professional ratings
Review scores
Source	Rating
AllMusic	(1991 CD)

The original soundtrack to the 1952 film The Belle of New York was released by MGM Records in the same year in several formats including a 10-inch 33-rpm LP record, a set of four 45-rpm EPs, and a set of several 10-inch 78-rpm phonograph records.

== Track listing ==
10-inch LP (MGM Records E-108)

Side 1
No.	Title	Artist(s)	Length
1.	"When I'm Out with the Belle of New York"
2.	"Oops!"	Fred Astaire
3.	"Naughty but Nice"	Anita Ellis
4.	"Bachelor Dinner Song"	Fred Astaire

Side 2
No.	Title	Artist(s)	Length
1.	"Baby Doll"	Fred Astaire
2.	"A Bride's Wedding-Day Song (Thank You Mister Currier, Thank You Mister Ives)"	Anita Ellis
3.	"Seeing's Believing"	Fred Astaire
4.	"I Wanna Be a Dancin' Man"	Fred Astaire
