= Easy to Dance With =

Studio album by Fred Astaire
- Released: 1959
- Label: Verve

Fred Astaire chronology
Funny Face (1957)	Easy to Dance With (1959)	Now Fred Astaire (1959)

Professional ratings
Review scores
Source	Rating
Billboard	4/4 stars

Easy to Dance With is a studio album by American dancer and singer Fred Astaire, released in 1959 on Verve Records.

Billboard reviewed the album and rated it four stars out of four, writing: "Astaire renders a flock of tunes from movies and shows in his relaxed, inimitable fashion. Five of the tunes were cleffed by the dancer himself. It's a relaxed and easy-listening set. Release is timely due to the recent release of the singer's autobiography. Package is highlighted by an interesting cover painting of Astaire and good notes. Tunes include "New Sun in the Sky," "The Way You Look Tonight" and "I Concentrate on You.""

== Track listing ==
LP (Verve MG V-2114)

Side A
No.	Title	Writer(s)	Length
1.	"You're Easy to Dance With"	Berlin
2.	"That Face"	Bergman–Spence
3.	"I'm Building Up to an Awful Letdown"	Mercer–Astaire
4.	"Just like Taking Candy from a Baby"	Shelley–Astaire
5.	"The Way You Look Tonight"	Fields–Kern
6.	"I Used to Be Color Blind"	Berlin

Side B
No.	Title	Writer(s)	Length
1.	"New Sun in the Sky"	Schwartz–Dietz
2.	"There's No Time like the Present"	Ruick–Astaire
3.	"I Concentrate on You"	Porter
4.	"Hello Baby"	Jaffe–Astaire–Ruick
5.	"So Near and yet So Far"	Porter
6.	"Sweet Sorrow"	Shelley–Astaire
