= 'S Wonderful =

1927 song by George and Ira Gershwin

- Sheet music, 1927

Song by George Gershwin and Ira Gershwin
- Published: 1927 by New World Music
- Genre: Jazz
- Composer: George Gershwin
- Lyricist: Ira Gershwin

"'S Wonderful" is a 1927 popular song composed by George Gershwin, with lyrics written by Ira Gershwin. It was introduced in the Broadway musical Funny Face (1927) by Adele Astaire and Allen Kearns.

The song is considered a standard and has been recorded by many artists, especially jazz artists. In 1928, Adele Astaire, who introduced the song on stage the previous year, recorded one of the earliest versions with Bernard Clifton. The most successful recordings in 1928 were however by Frank Crumit and by the Ipana Troubadors.

== Other recordings ==
Other vocal versions include those of Bing Crosby (recorded in 1954 for use on his radio show and subsequently included in the box set The Bing Crosby CBS Radio Recordings (1954-56) issued by Mosaic Records (catalog MD7-245) in 2009), Sun Ra, Brian Wilson, Anita O'Day, Gene Kelly, Ella Fitzgerald (for her album Ella Fitzgerald Sings the George and Ira Gershwin Song Book), Michael Feinstein (for his album Pure Gershwin), Joe Williams, John Pizzarelli, Sarah Vaughan, Karrin Allyson, Diana Krall for her album The Look of Love and as a duet with Tony Bennett on their collaborative album Love Is Here to Stay, João Gilberto, Shirley Bassey, Harry Connick Jr. and Engelbert Humperdinck. Ray Conniff recorded the song too, an instrumental version. It was his first minor hit, peaking at No. 73 on the Hot 100.

There have been many instrumental recordings, for example, by Dave Grusin, Ray Conniff, Lee Konitz and Lennie Tristano, Sonny Stitt, and Lionel Hampton with Oscar Peterson. The song also appears on the original Broadway cast recordings of Nice Work If You Can Get It and My One and Only, as well as the 2015 original Broadway cast recording of An American in Paris featuring Brandon Uranowitz, Robert Fairchild, and Max von Essen.

== Film and television appearances ==
The song was included in the 1951 movie An American in Paris, where it was sung by Gene Kelly and Georges Guétary, as well as in the 1957 American musical film Funny Face, in which it was performed by Audrey Hepburn and Fred Astaire. Doris Day also sang it in Starlift (1951) and Dean Martin sang it during the opening credits of the 1964 film Kiss Me, Stupid. In the Season 7 Family Ties episode "They Can't Take That Away From Me, Part 1", Alex Keaton (Michael J. Fox) and Marty Brodie (Jane Adams) play a piano duet version of the song. Max Gustafson (Walter Matthau) plays the song during a date in a scene from Grumpier Old Men (1995). A version by João Gilberto is featured in the 2010 film Eat Pray Love.

== See also ==
- List of 1920s jazz standards
