= Three Evenings with Fred Astaire =

Studio album by Fred Astaire
- Released: 1962
- Label: Choreo; MGM (UK)

Fred Astaire chronology
Now Fred Astaire (1959)	Three Evenings with Fred Astaire (1962)	A Couple of Song and Dance Men (1975)

Professional ratings
Review scores
Source	Rating
Billboard	positive ("Spotlight" pick)

Three Evenings with Fred Astaire is an album by American dancer and singer Fred Astaire, released on his own label Choreo Records in 1962.

The album collects songs performed by Astaire on three TV shows: An Evening with Fred Astaire (1958), Another Evening with Fred Astaire (1959), and Astaire Time (1960).

Billboard reviewed the album, writing: "Here's a solid collector's item for show music fans and veteran star Astaire's sizable following. Nostalgic, showmanly sound tracks from Astaire's three award-winning TV shows are spotlighted, featuring the star's personable delivery of great oldies (32 in all) and charming chatter about his career."

== Track listing ==
LP (Choreo Records A-1)

Side 1
No.	Title	Length
1.	"Medley" ("An Evening with Fred Astaire") (a) "Oh Lady, Be Good" (b) "Cheek to Cheek" (c) "A Fine Romance" (d) "They Can't Take That Away from Me" (e) "Nice Work if You Can Get It" (f) "A Foggy Day" (g) "I Won't Dance" (h) "Something's Gotta Give" (i) "Night and Day" (j) "Top Hat, White Tie and Tails"	7:14
2.	"Medley" ("Another Evening with Fred Astaire") (a) "Fascinating Rhythm" (b) "Dancing in the Dark" (c) "The Way You Look Tonight" (d) "Dearly Beloved" (e) "Steppin' Out with My Baby" (f) "Let's Face the Music and Dance" (g) "The Carioca" (h) "The Continental" (i) "One for My Baby" (j) "By Myself" (k) "That Face"	9:51

Side 2
No.	Title	Length
1.	"Medley" ("Astaire Time") (a) "Miss Otis Regrets" (b) "(Thank You So Much) Mrs. Lowborough Goodby"	6:22
2.	"Medley" ("Astaire Time") (a) "Funny Face" (b) "I Love Louisa" (c) "Flying Down to Rio" (d) "I'm Putting All My Eggs in One Basket" (e) "They All Laughed" (f) "Lovely to Look At" (g) "Let's Call the Whole Thing Off" (h) "Easter Parade" (i) "A Shine on Your Shoes" (j) "Svengali"	6:55
