= Clap Yo' Hands =

Song by George and Ira Gershwin

"Clap Yo' Hands" is a song composed by George Gershwin, with lyrics by Ira Gershwin.

It was introduced in the musical Oh, Kay! (1926), and was featured by Fred Astaire and Kay Thompson in a song and dance routine in Funny Face (1957).

== Notable recordings ==
- Roger Wolfe Kahn and his Orchestra (1927) - charted in the U.S. at No. 9.
- Whispering Jack Smith - Victor 20372-B; Matrix BVE-36992 (rec. Dec 2, 1926). This also reached the charts of the day.
- Toots Thielemans – Time Out for Toots (1958)
