= Now Fred Astaire =

Studio album by Fred Astaire
- Released: 1959
- Label: Kapp

Fred Astaire chronology
Easy to Dance With (1959)	Now Fred Astaire (1959)	Three Evenings with Fred Astaire (1962)

Professional ratings
Review scores
Source	Rating
Billboard	4/4 stars

Now Fred Astaire (or simply Now) is a studio album by American dancer and singer Fred Astaire, released in 1959 on Kapp Records.

Billboard reviewed the album and rated it four stars out of four, writing: "In his straightforward, easy-going, inimitable fashion, Fred Astaire warmly gives out with a varied program of standards, rhythm tunes and ballads, including medleys from some of his hit pix. Mr. Astaire is backed nicely by ork and chorus directed by Pete King. Arrangements by Mr. King and Marty Paich. Highlights include "Change Partners," "The Afterbeat," "They All Laughed," "Lady of the Evening," and the medleys mentioned above. His many fans and recent TV exposure should make this a big one."

== Track listing ==
LP (Kapp KL-1165)

Side 1
No.	Title	Writer(s)	Length
1.	"Change Partners"	Irving Berlin
2.	"Isn't This a Lovely Day (to Be Caught in the Rain?)"	Irving Berlin
3.	"A Foggy Day"	Gershwin–Gershwin
4.	"The Girl on the Magazine Cover" — "I Love to Quarrel with You" — "Along Came Ruth"	Irving Berlin
5.	"The Afterbeat"	Astaire–Mercer
6.	"They Can't Take That Away from Me"	Gershwin–Gershwin

Side 2
No.	Title	Writer(s)	Length
1.	"They All Laughed"	Gershwin–Gershwin
2.	"I'll Walk Alone"	Cahn–Styne
3.	"One for My Baby (and One More for the Road)"	Mercer–Arlen
4.	"Oh, Lady Be Good" — "Puttin' On the Ritz" — "Top Hat, White Tie and Tails"	Gershwin–Gershwin, Irving Berlin, Irving Berlin
5.	"Lady of the Evening"	Irving Berlin
6.	"Something's Gotta Give"	Johnny Mercer
