= Ralph Flanagan =

American bandleader and composer (1914–1995)

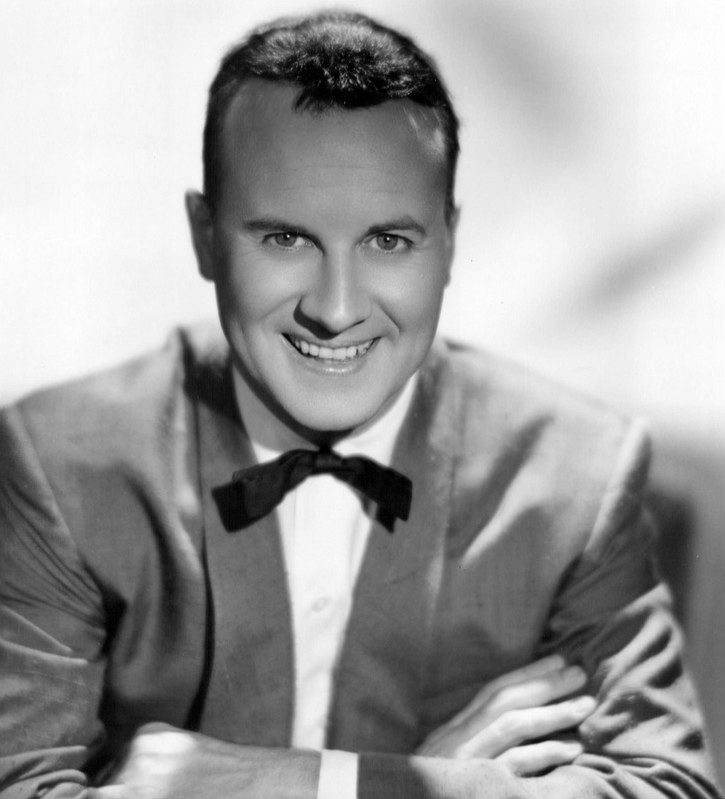
- Flanagan in 1956

Background information
- Born: Ralph Elias Flenniken; April 7, 1914; Lorain, Ohio, U.S.
- Died: December 30, 1995 (aged 81) Miami, Florida, U.S.
- Genres: Jazz, big band
- Occupations: Musician, bandleader, composer, arranger
- Instrument: Piano

Ralph Elias Flenniken (April 7, 1914 – December 30, 1995), known professionally as Ralph Flanagan, was an American big band leader, pianist, composer, and arranger for the orchestras of Hal McIntyre, Sammy Kaye, Blue Barron, Charlie Barnet, and Alvino Rey.

He joined the American Society of Composers, Authors, and Publishers in 1950.

== Biography ==
He was educated at Lorain High School in Lorain, Ohio, United States, where he was a member of the National Honors Society, the student senate, the school newspaper staff (Hi-Y) and the chorus.

During World War II he served in the Merchant Marine from October 1942 to 1946.

In August 1949 Flanagan was an arranger on The Chesterfield Supper Club radio program when RCA Victor signed him to arrange songs for a recording session. He had no band of his own, so a studio band was used, with Flanagan's name on the records' labels. The records' popularity resulted in requests for bookings of the "Ralph Flanagan Band", and he formed his own orchestra. That group is credited with re-popularizing the Glenn Miller "sound," and which made many records, among them "Singing Winds", "Rag Mop" and "Hot Toddy". The Ralph Flanagan band was managed by Herb Hendler, an RCA A&R man who had signed Glenn Miller to his final record contract before Miller's fatal plane crash in the English Channel during World War II. It was Hendler who had encouraged Flanagan to adopt the Miller sound that led to his success. Hendler also co-wrote "Hot Toddy," which was recorded by many artists, including Chet Atkins, Rosemary Clooney, Red Foley and Julie London.

Flanagan's recording of "Slow Poke", a number 6 hit in early 1952, was the first song played on the initial edition of the Today Show on January 14, 1952.

The Flanagan orchestra's theme songs were "Giannina Mia" and "Singing Winds", the latter title also applying to the orchestra's singing group.

During the peak of his career, he also lived in the suburban village of Malverne, New York.

== Royalties ==
As of August 19, 2010, Ralph Flanagan and his Orchestra were listed by EMI Music as a missing royaltor, which means that EMI have lost contact with the estate of Flanagan and his heirs and band members, and that royalty checks are being returned to the record company by the Post Office.

== Discography ==
- Ralph Flanagan Plays Rodgers and Hammerstein II for Dancing (RCA Victor, 1949)
- Let's Dance Again with Flanagan (RCA Victor, 1951)
- Ralph Flanagan and His Orchestra (Metronome, 1951)
- Favorites (RCA Victor, 1951)
- The Old Ox Road (RCA Victor, 1952)
- Ralph Flanagan Plays Rodgers and Hammerstein II Vol. II (RCA Victor, 1951)
- Dance to the Top Pops (RCA Victor, 1952)
- Tops in Pops (RCA Victor, 1954)
- The War of the Bands Concert (RCA Victor, 1954)
- Junior-Senior Prom (RCA Victor, 1954)
- The Freshman-Sophomore Frolics (RCA Victor, 1954)
- 1001 Nighters (RCA Victor, 1956)
- Dancing Down Broadway (RCA Camden, 1956)
- Dancing in the Dark (RCA Camden, 1957)
- They're Playing Our Song (Imperial, 1958)
- Ralph Flanagan in Hi-Fi (RCA Victor, 1958)
- Holiday Inn (Imperial, 1959)
- Plays Your Request (Imperial, 1959)
- They're Playing Our Cha Cha! (Imperial, 1960)
- Dance to the New Live Sound of Ralph Flanagan (Coral, 1961)
- Live from the Palladium (Collectors' Choice, 2001)
- The Big Band Sounds of Ralph Flanagan (Sounds of Yesteryear, 2013)
