= Ilene Woods =

American actress (1929–2010)

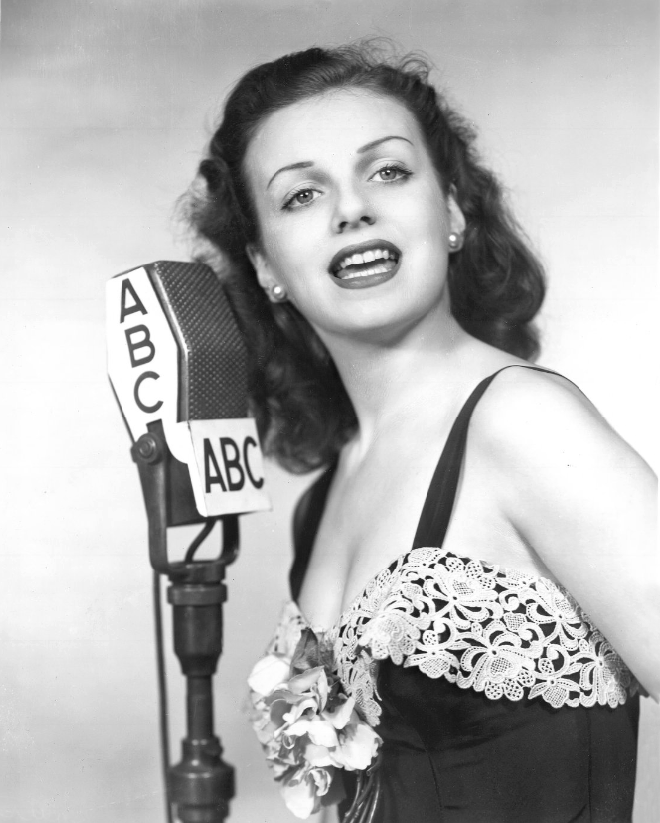
- Woods performing for ABC in the 1940s
- Born: Jacqueline Ruth Woods; May 5, 1929; Portsmouth, New Hampshire, U.S.
- Died: July 1, 2010 (aged 81); Los Angeles, California, U.S.
- Occupations: Actress; singer
- Years active: 1944–2004
- Spouses: Stephen Steck Jr. (m. 1946; div. 1954) Ed Shaughnessy (m. 1963)
- Children: 3
- Awards: Disney Legend (2003)

Jacqueline Ruth Woods (May 5, 1929 – July 1, 2010), better known as Ilene Woods, was an American actress and singer. Woods was best known as the original voice of the title character of Walt Disney animated film Cinderella, for which she was named a Disney Legend in 2003.

== Early life ==
Jacqueline Ruth Woods was born on May 5, 1929 in Portsmouth, New Hampshire. Her mother worked behind the scenes of films, taking Woods with her. As a little girl, Woods dreamed about becoming a schoolteacher, but her mother wanted her to become a singer. By 1944, she gained her own radio program. During World War II, she toured with Paul Whiteman and the Army Air Forces Orchestra.

== Career ==
=== Disney ===
In 1948, two of her songwriter friends, Mack David and Jerry Livingston, called Woods to record "A Dream Is a Wish Your Heart Makes", "Bibbidi-Bobbidi-Boo", and "So This is Love". Soon, the songs were presented to Walt Disney so that they could be used in the English version of Cinderella. Walt Disney heard the demo recordings, and two days later asked Ilene to voice the star role of Cinderella. She gladly accepted the role, surprised that she had won against more than 300 others who had auditioned. She said in an interview for Classic Film, "Seeing it [the film] in its new form was breathtaking for me. It's so beautiful. The color is magnificent, it just took my breath away, it was so wonderful. I sort of forget when I'm watching the movie that I had anything to do with it. Yet, it brings back so many beautiful memories of working with the wonderful artists and working with Walt mostly. It brings back wonderful, wonderful memories." To promote Cinderella, Woods voiced Snow White in the 1949 Disney audiobook release of Snow White and the Seven Dwarfs. Woods sang for President Franklin D. Roosevelt at his home in Hyde Park. She also sang at the White House for President Truman, after singing for soldiers and sailors. Woods retired from show business in 1972, but she continued to appear at occasional autograph shows.

=== Radio and television ===
On radio, Woods was a featured performer on Sealtest Village Store and portrayed the title character's girlfriend on A Day in the Life of Dennis Day. She was the female vocalst on The Garry Moore Show, was the singing star of The Jack Carson Show, and had her own program in 1948 as the summer replacement for the Carson show. Her work on television included singing for two years on Arthur Godfrey's show and one year on Moore's show. She also sang on Perry Como's program.

=== Recordings ===
Woods had the title role in a 1950 Victor album based on the Cinderella film. She provided the voice of Snow White on the Victor recording Snow White and the Seven Dwarfs (1960). A brief review in The New York Times said of the recording, "It includes the happy songs, but without the authority of the original Disneyland recordings."

=== Later years ===
When Disney began releasing video cassette versions of its animated films, Woods was one of at least three actresses to file lawsuits over royalties for their performances; at the time of Woods' December 1990 filing, Peggy Lee of Lady and the Tramp (1955) had won her lawsuit the previous April and a 1989 suit by Mary Costa of Sleeping Beauty (1959) was still pending. Voice actress Jennifer Hale replaced Woods as the voice of Cinderella in the 2002 film Cinderella II: Dreams Come True. In 2003, Woods was awarded a Disney Legend award for her voice work on Cinderella. In an interview with Starlog in 2006 Woods said, "I love the idea that after I’m gone, children will still be hearing my voice [as Cinderella]."

== Personal life ==
She married the first time at the age of 17 to trumpeter Stephen Steck, Jr. and had a daughter, Stephanie. After a divorce, she married The Tonight Show drummer Ed Shaughnessy in 1963. Woods and Shaughnessy had two sons, James and Daniel.

=== Illness and death ===
Woods suffered from Alzheimer's disease. She resided at a care facility in Canoga Park, Los Angeles in the later years of her life. She did not remember that she played Cinderella, but was mostly comforted by the song "A Dream Is a Wish Your Heart Makes" and the nurses played it for her as often as possible, realizing she liked it. On July 1, 2010, at the age of 81, she died from complications of Alzheimer's. No service was held, Woods was cremated, and her ashes were given to her family.

== Work ==
=== Filmography ===
==== Television ====
Year	Title	Role	Notes
1951	The Alan Young Show	Singing Neighbor	Uncredited

===== Television shows =====
Year	Title	Role	Notes
1950	We, the People	Herself	Episode: "Gene Stanlee, Ilene Woods"
1951	The Garry Moore Show	Herself	19 episodes
1956	Of All Things	Herself	Regular Performer

==== Film ====
Year	Title	Role	Notes
1945	On Stage Everybody	Talent Show Winner No. 3	
1950	Cinderella	Cinderella	Voice

==== Radio ====
Year	Title	Role	Notes
1944	The Philco Hall of Fame	Singer	Regular member
1944	The Ilene Woods Show	Herself / Host	

=== Discography ===
- Walt Disney's Snow White and the Seven Dwarfs as Snow White (1949, RCA Camden)
- Cinderella (1950, RCA Victor)
- It's Late (1957, Jubilee Records JGM 1046, LP, mono)

== Accolades ==
Year	Award	Category	Result	Nominated work	Ref.
2003	Disney Legends	Music—Voice	Won	Cinderella	
