= Funny Face =

1957 film by Stanley Donen

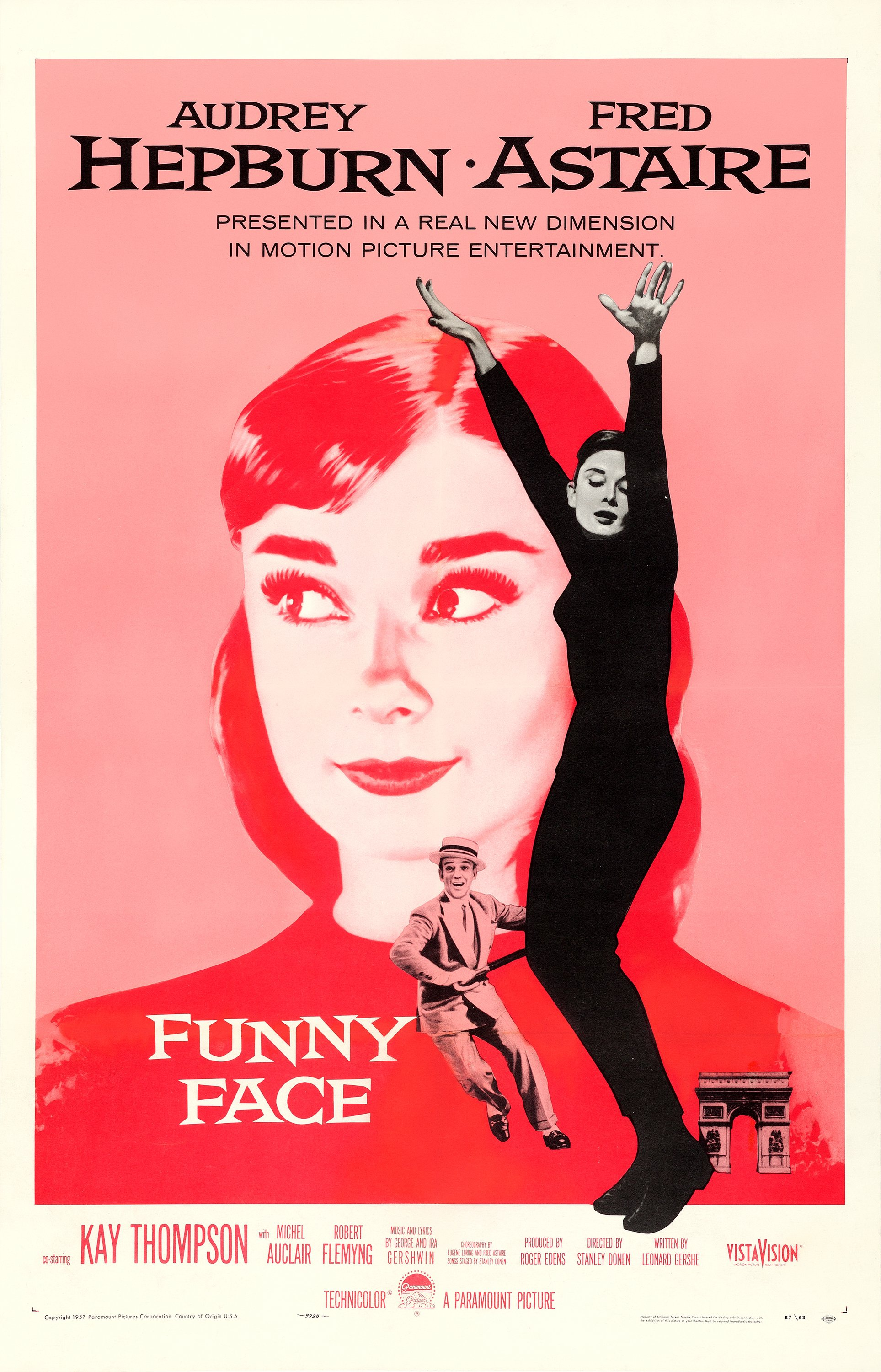
- Theatrical release poster
- Directed by: Stanley Donen
- Written by: Leonard Gershe
- Produced by: Roger Edens
- Starring: Audrey Hepburn; Fred Astaire; Kay Thompson; Michel Auclair; Robert Flemyng
- Cinematography: Ray June
- Edited by: Frank Bracht
- Music by: Adolph Deutsch; Songs: George Gershwin; Ira Gershwin; Roger Edens
- Distributed by: Paramount Pictures
- Release date: February 13, 1957 (United States)
- Running time: 103 minutes
- Country: United States
- Languages: English; French
- Budget: $3 million
- Box office: $2.5 million

Funny Face is a 1957 American musical romantic comedy film directed by Stanley Donen and written by Leonard Gershe, containing assorted songs by George and Ira Gershwin. Although having the same title as the 1927 Broadway musical Funny Face by the Gershwin brothers, and featuring the same male star (Fred Astaire), the plot is completely different and only four of the songs from the stage musical are included. Alongside Astaire, the film stars Audrey Hepburn and Kay Thompson.

== Plot ==
Maggie Prescott, a fashion magazine publisher and editor for Quality magazine, is looking for the next big fashion trend. She wants a new look which is to be both "beautiful" and "intellectual". She and top fashion photographer Dick Avery want models who can "think as well as they look." The two brainstorm and come up with the idea to use a book store in Greenwich Village as backdrop.

They find what they want in "Embryo Concepts", which is being run by the shy shop assistant and amateur philosopher, Jo Stockton. Jo thinks the fashion and modelling industry is nonsense, calling it "chichi, and an unrealistic approach to self-impressions as well as economics". Maggie decides to use Jo but after the first shot Jo is locked outside to keep her from interrupting Maggie’s take-over of the shop. The crew leaves the store in a shambles; Dick stays behind to help clean up and apologizes to Jo, then kisses her impulsively. Jo dismisses him, but her song "How Long Has This Been Going On?" shows that she feels the stirrings of romance.

What Jo wants above all is to go to Paris and attend the famous Professor Émile Flostre's philosophy lectures about empathicalism. When Dick gets back to the darkroom, he sees something in Jo's face which is new and fresh and would be perfect for the campaign, giving it "character", "spirit", and "intelligence". They send for Jo, pretending they want to order some books from her shop. Once she arrives, they try to make her over and attempt to cut her hair. She is outraged and runs away, only to hide in the darkroom where Dick is working. When Dick mentions Paris, Jo becomes interested in the chance to see Professor Flostre and is finally persuaded to model for the magazine. Dick sings "Funny Face".

Soon, Maggie, Dick, and Jo are off to Paris to prepare for a major fashion event, shooting photos at famous landmarks from the area. During the various shoots, Jo and Dick fall in love ("He Loves and She Loves"). One night, when Jo is getting ready for a gala, she learns Flostre is giving a lecture at a cafe nearby, which she attends. Eventually, Dick brings her back and they get into an argument at the gala's opening, which results in Jo being publicly embarrassed and Maggie outraged.

Jo goes to talk to Flostre at his home. Through some scheming, Maggie and Dick gain entrance to the soirée there. After performing an impromptu song and dance (“Clap Yo’ Hands” from the Gershwins’ 1926 musical Oh, Kay!) for Flostre's disciples, they confront Jo and Flostre. This leads to Dick causing Flostre to fall and knock himself out. Jo urges them to leave but when Flostre comes round, he tries to seduce her. Shocked at the behavior of her "idol", she smashes a vase over his head and runs out, returning just in time to take part in the final fashion show. During this, Maggie tries to get in touch with Dick, who has made plans to leave Paris. Before her wedding gown finale, Jo looks out the window and sees the plane Dick was supposed to be on flying over the city. Believing that he has refused to return to her, she runs off the runway in tears at the conclusion of the show.

Meanwhile, Dick is still at the airport. He runs into Flostre and learns how Jo had attacked him. Realizing how much Jo cares, Dick returns to the fashion show, but Jo is nowhere to be found. Finally, after applying the insights of empathicalism at Maggie's behest, Dick guesses that Jo would return to the church where he had photographed her in a wedding dress and they shared their first romantic moment. On his arrival there himself, he finds Jo (in the wedding gown) by a little brook. They join in the duet "'S Wonderful" and embrace.

== Cast ==
- Audrey Hepburn as Jo Stockton
- Fred Astaire as Dick Avery
- Kay Thompson as Maggie Prescott
- Michel Auclair as Professor Émile Flostre
- Robert Flemyng as Paul Duval
- Dovima as Marion
- Jean Del Val as Hairdresser
- Virginia Gibson as Babs
- Sue England as Laura
- Ruta Lee as Lettie
- Alex Gerry as Dovitch
- Suzy Parker as Specialty Dancer (Pink Number)
- Sunny Harnett as Specialty Dancer (Pink Number)

== Musical numbers ==
- "Think Pink!"
- "How Long Has This Been Going On?" - originally composed for the musical Funny Face, but not used
- "How Long Has This Been Going On? (Reprise)"
- "Funny Face" - from Funny Face (1927 musical)
- "Bonjour, Paris!"
- "Basal Metabolism"
- "Let's Kiss and Make Up" - from Funny Face
- "He Loves and She Loves" - from Funny Face
- "Bonjour, Paris! (Reprise)"
- "On How to Be Lovely"
- "Clap Yo' Hands" - from Oh, Kay!
- "'S Wonderful" - from Funny Face

== Production ==
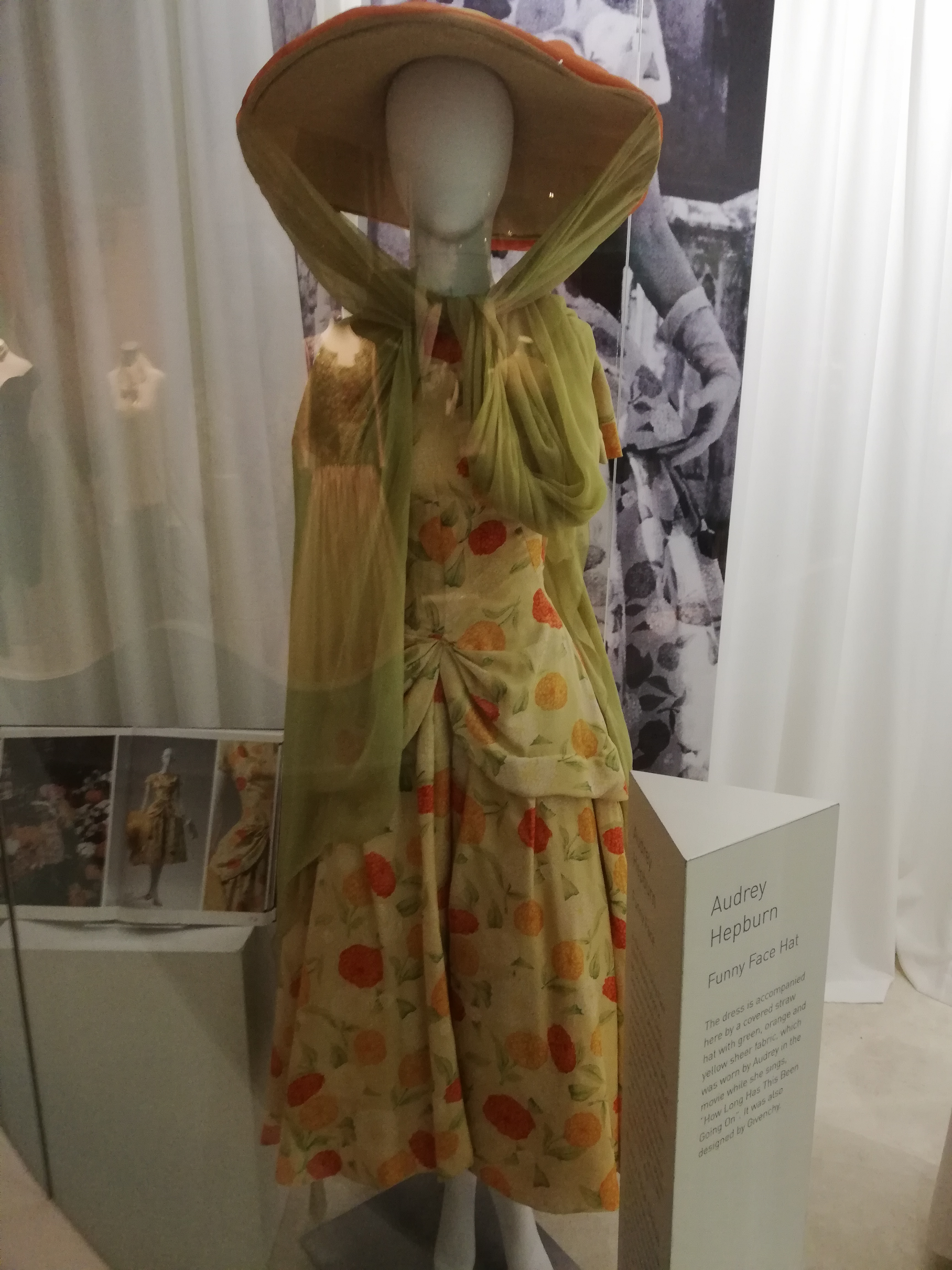
Clothing worn by Hepburn in Funny Face

The plot of the film version is drastically different from that of the Broadway musical, and only four of the songs remain. Astaire also starred in the stage version alongside his sister, Adele Astaire. The film plot is actually adapted from another Broadway musical, Wedding Bells, by Leonard Gershe. The original title for the film was Wedding Day.

Hepburn sings the songs herself in this, her first musical. She performs one solo, "How Long Has This Been Going On?"; a duet with Astaire, "'S Wonderful"; a duet with Kay Thompson called "On How to Be Lovely"; and takes part in an ensemble performance of "Bonjour, Paris!". Her previous dance training is also called into play, not only in the two dance numbers she performs with Astaire but also for a Bohemian-style solo dance in a nightclub.

As was the case with many of her leading men, Astaire was much older than Hepburn. At 58, three decades Hepburn's senior, he was approaching the end of his musical film career, in this, the second in a consecutive series of three French-themed musicals he made in the 1950s. He performs a song and dance solo with umbrella and cape to Gershwin's "Let's Kiss and Make Up". According to Hepburn, she insisted on Astaire as a precondition for her participation. Thompson, who usually worked behind the scenes as a musical director for films, makes a rare appearance on camera as Maggie Prescott, a fashion magazine editor loosely based on Diana Vreeland. (Architectural historian Francis Morrone says it was Carmel Snow, editor-in-chief of Harper’s Bazaar, who was the inspiration for the Maggie Prescott character.) Besides her duet with Hepburn, she performs the solo number "Think Pink!" in the presence of a dance chorus, and Thompson and Astaire perform a comic dance duet to "Clap Yo' Hands". (While at Vogue, Vreeland once sent a memo to staff urging them to "Today let's think pig white! Wouldn't it be wonderful to have stockings that were pig white! The color of baby pigs, not quite white and not quite pink!")

Astaire's character was loosely based on the career of Richard Avedon, who provided a number of the photographs seen in the film, including the stills for the opening credits, which were also used in the halls of Quality magazine. Probably the most famous single image from the film is the intentionally overexposed close-up of Hepburn's face in which only her facial features—her eyes, eyebrows, nose and mouth—are visible. This image is seen briefly in black-and-white at the very beginning of the opening title sequence, which was designed by Avedon, during the "Funny Face" musical number which takes place in a darkroom, and when Dick (Astaire) presents it to Maggie (Thompson).

== Release ==
=== Box office ===
On initial release, Funny Face was a box office disappointment and failed to break even. However, in 1964, when My Fair Lady (also starring Hepburn) was released to excellent reviews and huge box office grosses, Paramount theatrically reissued Funny Face. As a result, the film drew substantial crowds and finally turned a profit.

=== Critical reception ===
The film was generally well received in the United States. Bosley Crowther of The New York Times, for example, lauded it as "delightfully balmy," "colorful and glittering," and "extraordinarily stylish," "with class in every considerable department on which this sort of picture depends." The reviewer for The Times, however, was not impressed when the film opened at the Odeon in London on April 25, 1957: "...a displeasing piece of work, pseudo-sophisticated, expensive and brash in approach, vulgar in taste and insensitive in outlook. This, in fact, is the American 'musical' at its worst; not even the presence of Mr Fred Astaire, who was in the original stage production, can save the day. It may seem extravagant to discuss a 'musical' in terms proper to a serious creative work, yet there is that in the film's attitude towards the 'intellectual', whether in Greenwich Village or Paris, which offends. It is not amiable parody and it is not telling satire; it has its roots in the ill-based instinct to jeer, and its jeers are offensive."

On review aggregator website Rotten Tomatoes, the film has an 85% rating, based on 40 reviews. The consensus summarizes: "A timeless and elegant musical feast, Funny Face thrives on the agile and vibrant performances from legendary screen titans Audrey Hepburn and Fred Astaire."

=== Accolades ===
The National Board of Review gave the film Special Citation award for the photographic innovations. Leonard Gershe was nominated for "Best Written American Musical" by the Writers Guild of America. Stanley Donen was nominated by the Directors Guild of America for "Outstanding Directorial Achievement in Motion Pictures" and for a "Golden Palm" at the 1957 Cannes Film Festival. Fred Astaire received a Golden Laurel nomination for "Top Male Musical Performance". The film received four Academy Award "Oscar" nominations: Leonard Gershe for "Best Writing, Story and Screenplay - Written Directly for the Screen"; Edith Head and Hubert de Givenchy (Hepburn's costume designer) for "Best Costume Design"; Ray June for "Best Cinematography"; and Hal Pereira, George W. Davis, Sam Comer, and Ray Moyer for "Best Art Direction-Set Decoration".

== Home media ==
To date, Funny Face has been released to DVD in Region 1 (North America) in three editions from Paramount Home Entertainment: in 2001 as part of the "Audrey Hepburn Widescreen Collection" series, in 2007 in a 50th Anniversary edition, and in 2009 as part of Paramount's Centennial Collection. The 2007 version has additional featurettes as well as improved picture and sound quality from the 2001 edition. The 2009 release is spread over two discs and includes a few additional featurettes not included in the 2007 edition such as Kay Thompson's "Think Pink", "This is VistaVision" and "Fashion Photographers Exposed".

== See also ==
- List of American films of 1957
