= Royal Wedding (soundtrack) =

Soundtrack album
- Released: 1951
- Genre: Show tunes
- Label: MGM

Fred Astaire chronology
| Three Little Words (1950) | Royal Wedding (1951) | The Belle of New York (1952) |

Professional ratings
Review scores
| Source | Rating |
|---|---|
| AllMusic | (CD, expanded ed., 1991) |

The original soundtrack to the 1951 film Royal Wedding was released by MGM Records in the same year in three formats: as a set of four 10-inch 78-rpm phonograph records, a set of four 45-rpm EPs, and as a 10-inch 33-rpm LP record.

== Track listing ==
10-inch LP (MGM Records E-543)

Side 1
| No. | Title | Artist(s) | Length |
|---|---|---|---|
| 1. | "Too Late Now" | Jane Powell |
| 2. | "Every Night at Seven" | Fred Astaire |
| 3. | "Happiest Day of My Life" | Jane Powell |
| 4. | "I Left My Hat in Haiti" | Fred Astaire |

Side 2
| No. | Title | Artist(s) | Length |
|---|---|---|---|
| 1. | "Open Your Eyes" | Jane Powell |
| 2. | "Sunday Jumps" |
| 3. | "You're All the World to Me" | Fred Astaire |
| 4. | "How Could You Believe Me When I Said I Loved You When You Know I've Been a Liar All My Life" | Fred Astaire and Jane Powell |
