= The Band Wagon (soundtrack) =

Soundtrack album
- Released: 1953
- Genre: Show tunes
- Label: MGM

Fred Astaire chronology
| The Astaire Story (1953) | The Band Wagon (1953) | Funny Face (1957) |

Professional ratings
Review scores
| Source | Rating |
|---|---|
| Billboard | positive |

The original soundtrack to the 1953 film The Band Wagon was released by MGM Records in the same year in three formats: as a set of four 10-inch 78-rpm phonograph records, a set of two 45-rpm EPs, and as a 12-inch 33-rpm LP record. (The 78-rpm and 45-rpm issues didn't include "The Girl Hunt Ballet", though it could be purchased separately on a 45-rpm EP.)

== Track listing ==
LP (MGM Records E3051)

Side 1
| No. | Title | Artist(s) | Length |
|---|---|---|---|
| 1. | "A Shine on Your Shoes" | Fred Astaire |
| 2. | "By Myself" | Fred Astaire |
| 3. | "Dancing in the Dark" | MGM Studio Orchestra |
| 4. | "Triplets" | Fred Astaire, Nanette Fabray and Jack Buchanan |
| 5. | "New Sun in the Sky" "I Guess I'll Have to Change My Plan" | India Adams; Fred Astaire and Jack Buchanan |
| 6. | "Louisiana Hayride" | Nanette Fabray |

Side 2
| No. | Title | Artist(s) | Length |
|---|---|---|---|
| 1. | "I Love Louisa" | Fred Astaire |
| 2. | "That's Entertainment" | Fred Astaire, Nanette Fabray, Jack Buchanan and India Adams |
| 3. | "The Girl Hunt Ballet" |
