= Three Little Words (soundtrack) =

Soundtrack album by various artists
- Released: 1950
- Label: MGM

Fred Astaire chronology
Easter Parade (1949)	Three Little Words (1950)	Royal Wedding (1951)

The original soundtrack to the 1950 Metro-Goldwyn-Mayer film Three Little Words, starring Fred Astaire and Red Skelton, was released by MGM Records in the same year.

The album was released in several formats: as a set of four 10-inch 78-rpm phonograph records (cat. no. 53), a set of four 7-inch 45-rpm records (cat. no. K53) and as a 10-inch LP (cat. no. E-516).

The album spent numerous weeks at number one on Billboard's Best-Selling Pop Albums chart – on both the 33⅓-rpm and 45-rpm halves of it.

== Track listing ==
10-inch LP (MGM Records E-516)

Side 1
No.	Title	Writer(s)	Artist(s)	Length
1.	"Nevertheless (I'm in Love with You)"	Kalmar–Ruby	Fred Astaire, Red Skelton and Anita Ellis
2.	"I Love You So Much"	Ruby–Kalmar	Arlene Dahl
3.	"All Alone Monday"	Ruby–Kalmar	Gale Robbins
4.	"Where Did You Get That Girl"	Puck–Kalmar	Fred Astaire and Anita Ellis

Side 2
No.	Title	Writer(s)	Artist(s)	Length
1.	"Thinking of You"	Ruby–Kalmar	Anita Ellis
2.	"I Wanna Be Loved by You"	Stothart–Ruby–Kalmar	Helen Kane
3.	"Who's Sorry Now?"	Snyder–Ruby–Kalmar	Gloria De Haven
4.	"My Sunny Tennessee, So Long! Oo-Long (How Long You Gonna Be Gone?)" "Three Little Words"	Ruby–Kalmar	Fred Astaire and Red Skelton

== Charts ==
Chart (1950)	Peak position
US Billboard Best Selling Pop Albums – Best Selling 33⅓ R.P.M.	1
US Billboard Best Selling Pop Albums – Best Selling 45 R.P.M.	1
