= Funny Face (musical) =

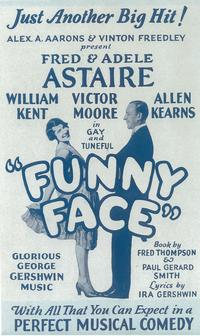
- Music: George Gershwin
- Lyrics: Ira Gershwin
- Book: Paul Gerard Smith; Fred Thompson
- Setting: Lake Wapatog, New Jersey; Atlantic City, New Jersey
- Premiere: November 22, 1927: Alvin Theatre, New York City
- Productions: 1927 Broadway; 1928 West End; 1929 UK tour; 1929 West End

Funny Face is a 1927 musical composed by George Gershwin, with lyrics by Ira Gershwin, and book by Fred Thompson and Paul Gerard Smith. When it opened on Broadway on November 22, 1927, as the first show performed in the newly built Alvin Theatre, it starred Fred Astaire and his sister Adele Astaire. It was in this show that Astaire first danced in evening clothes and a top hat.

Originally called Smarty, it first opened in Philadelphia on October 11, 1927, to poor reviews. This led to major rewrites and caused critic-humorist Robert Benchley, who had contributed to the script, to walk out. The rewrites and changes continued as the musical moved from Philadelphia to Washington, D.C. (October 31); to Atlantic City (November 7); to Wilmington (November 14); before reaching Broadway and the Alvin Theatre on November 22, now renamed Funny Face. It became a major Broadway hit, and after 244 performances, the whole company transferred it to London, where Fred and Adele Astaire had had a successful run of Lady, Be Good! just before starting the rehearsals of Smarty in Philadelphia.

The London production opened at Princes Theatre on November 8, 1928, and ran there until January 29, 1929. After a short tour of the UK provinces, the musical re-opened at the Winter Garden Theatre in London on March 11, 1929, where it ran until June 1929, chalking up a total of 263 performances. Leslie Henson shared top billing with Fred and Adele Astaire.

== Plot ==
Setting: The house of Jimmy Reeve; the house of Peter Thurston; Lake Wapatog, New Jersey and Atlantic City, New Jersey

Jimmy Reeve is the legal guardian of three pretty sisters, Dora, June and Frankie, whose prize belongings he keeps in his safe. June's pearl necklace is locked in there, and so is Frankie's diary, after having been confiscated by Jimmy. However, the diary contains very incriminating things, so Frankie convinces the aviator Peter Thurston to steal it from the safe. But somehow he manages to steal the pearls instead, setting off a merry chase that takes the cast to the Atlantic City pier. And to make matters even more complicated, two bumbling burglars, Herbert and Dugsie, also try to break into the safe and are swept along in the chase. At one point, they have a falling out, but Herbert is unable to shoot Dugsie as he has forgotten to get a shooting license.

== Principal casts ==
The show opened at the Alvin Theatre on November 22, 1927, and ran for 244 performances. It was directed by Edgar MacGregor, with choreography by Bobby Connolly.

Character	Broadway	West End
Character	(1927)	(1928)
Jimmy Reeve	Fred Astaire	Fred Astaire
Frankie	Adele Astaire	Adele Astaire
June	Gertrude McDonald	Eileen Hatton
Dora	Betty Compton	Rita Page
Peter Thurston	Allen Kearns	Bernard Clifton
Dugsie Gibbs	William Kent	Leslie Henson
Herbert	Victor Moore	Sydney Howard

== Songs ==
Act 1

- "Birthday Party" – Dora, June and Guests
- "Once" – Dugsie Gibbs, Dora and Ensemble
- "Funny Face" – Frankie and Jimmy Reeve
- "High Hat" – Jimmy Reeve and Boys
- "'S Wonderful" – Frankie and Peter Thurston
- "Let's Kiss and Make Up" – Frankie, Jimmy Reeve and Ensemble
- "Come Along, Let's Gamble" – Entire Company

Act 2

- "In the Swim" – Girls
- "He Loves and She Loves" – Frankie and Peter Thurston
- "Tell the Doc" – Dugsie Gibbs and Girls
- "My One and Only (What Am I Going To Do?)" – Jimmy Reeve, June, Dora and Girls
- "Sing a Little Song" – Pianists, Ritz Quartette, and Boys
- "My One and Only (What Am I Going to Do?)" (Reprise) – Dora, June and Chorus
- "The Babbitt and the Bromide" – Frankie and Jimmy Reeve

Dropped during tryouts

"How Long Has This Been Going On? — Frankie and Peter (replaced with "He Loves and She Loves"; the song was modified for Rosalie the next year)

== Adaptions and inspirations ==
- The plot of 1936 British film She Knew What She Wanted is loosely based on the musical, but doesn't contain any of the music.
- The 1957 film musical Funny Face, which also starred Fred Astaire, featured just four songs from the stage musical, and the plot was totally different.
- The 1983 Broadway musical My One and Only was claimed to be a revival of the original musical, but contained only some of the songs and had a very different plot.
