= Adele Astaire =

American dancer and entertainer (1896–1981)

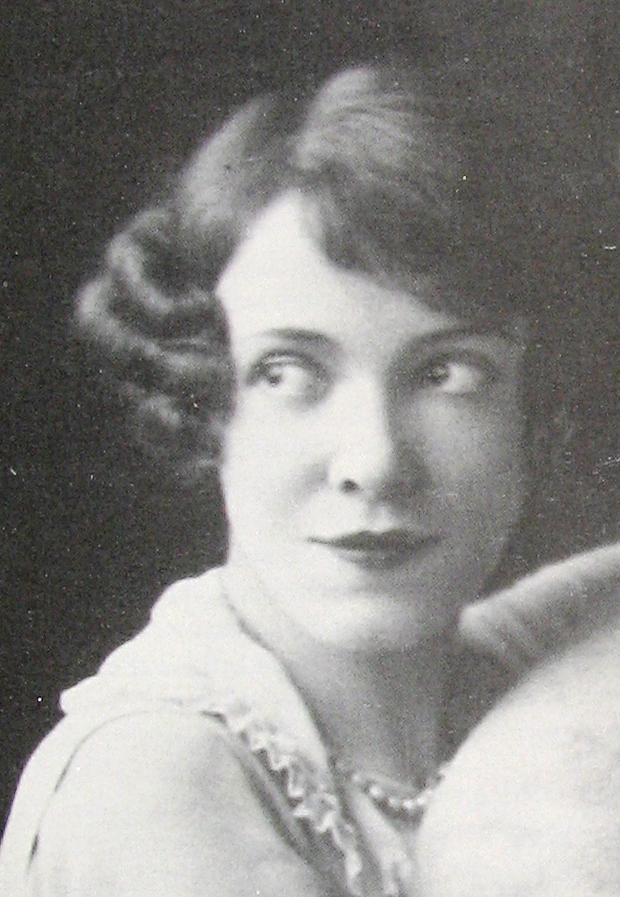
- Astaire in 1919
- Born: Adele Marie Austerlitz; September 10, 1896; Omaha, Nebraska, U.S.
- Died: January 25, 1981 (aged 84); Scottsdale, Arizona, U.S.
- Occupations: Dancer; entertainer
- Years active: 1905–1932
- Spouses: Lord Charles Cavendish (m. 1932; died 1944) Kingman Douglass (m. 1947; died 1971)
- Children: 3
- Relatives: Fred Astaire (brother)

Adele Astaire Douglass (born Adele Marie Austerlitz, later known as Lady Charles Cavendish; September 10, 1896 – January 25, 1981) was an American dancer, stage actress, and singer. After beginning work as a dancer and vaudeville performer at the age of nine, Astaire built a successful performance career with her younger brother, Fred Astaire.

The brother and sister act initially worked their way through vaudeville circuits, finally achieving a breakthrough with their first Broadway roles in 1917. Astaire became known for her talents as a skilled dancer and comedienne, starring in hit Broadway musicals such as Lady, Be Good! (1924), Funny Face (1927) and The Band Wagon (1931). The siblings took several of their more popular shows to Britain's West End during the 1920s, where they were soon international celebrities, meeting members of the British royal family and prominent figures from contemporary arts and literature circles.

In 1932, after a 27-year partnership with her brother, Astaire retired from the stage to marry Lord Charles Cavendish, the second son of Victor Cavendish, 9th Duke of Devonshire. The couple moved to the Cavendish estate of Lismore Castle in Ireland. Despite offers of both stage and film roles from producers eager to see her return to acting, Astaire declined to come out of retirement. Following Cavendish's death in 1944, Astaire remarried and moved back to the United States. She divided her time between properties in the United States; Round Hill, Jamaica; and her old home of Lismore Castle, where she spent her summers up until the end of her life.

In 1972, Astaire was inducted into the American Theater Hall of Fame.

In 1975, Astaire was inducted into the International Best Dressed Hall of Fame List.

== Early life and vaudeville (1896–1917) ==
Adele Marie Austerlitz was born on September 10, 1896, in Omaha, Nebraska. Her parents were Johanna "Ann" Geilus, an American-born Lutheran of German descent, and Frederic "Fritz" Austerlitz, an Austrian-born Roman Catholic of Jewish descent. Adele's younger brother, Fred Austerlitz, was born three years after her.

Adele's birth year is cited incorrectly in some sources. (Note: E.g. her obituary in the New York Times, Gaiter 1981) Adele's mother became pregnant shortly before turning 16 years old, and married in 1894 with her father's consent. That pregnancy did not come to term, and the couple later told people they had married in 1896 in order to avoid a perception of impropriety. The fictional marriage year created a second perception of impropriety when Adele was born in 1896, so the family later changed references to Adele's birthdate to 1897 or 1898. The altered timelines create confusion over the age gap between Adele and her brother Fred, with various sources giving the difference as anywhere from half a year to three years.

After Adele showed an early propensity for dance, she was enrolled in a local dance school. She soon stood out for her natural ability as a dancer, and began making appearances at local recitals and parties. Her parents decided to enroll Fred as well — a somewhat frail child in his earliest years — with the intention of having him build strength through dance training, and he, too, showed the beginnings of aptitude. When Adele was eight and Fred was five, a teacher suggested that the two children might have a stage career if they received proper training. This prompted the family to move from Omaha to New York, though the father returned to Omaha to work. Adele, Fred and their mother lived in a boarding house, and the children began attending the Alviene Master School of the Theatre and Academy of Cultural Arts. Adele and Fred adopted the more American-sounding surname Astaire after trying several variations on the original Austerlitz, and their mother Ann also adopted the new surname.

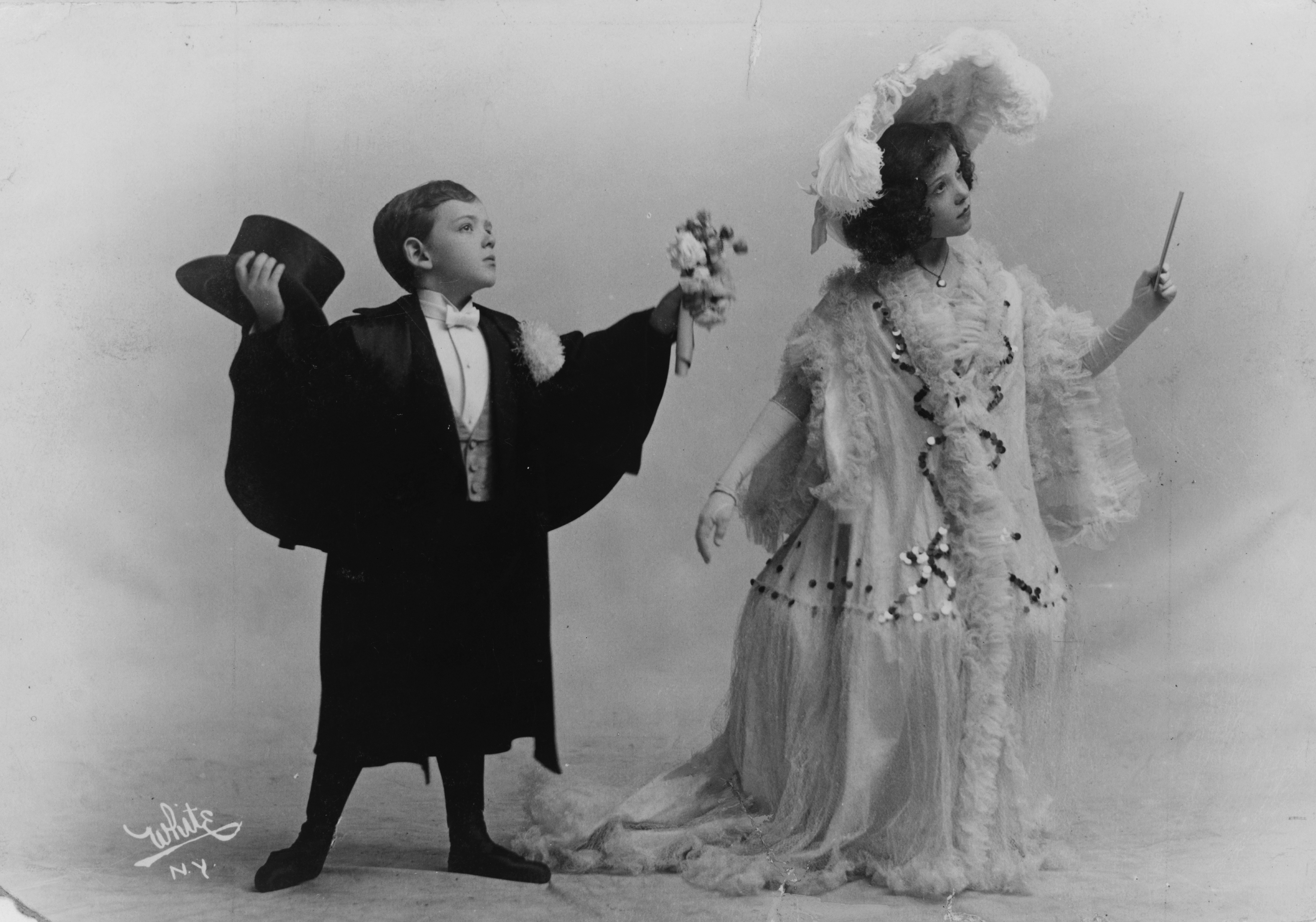
Adele and her brother Fred in 1906

In late 1905, with the assistance of her dance instructor Claude Alvienne, Adele Astaire began a professional vaudeville act with Fred. Alvienne helped them develop a routine involving two large, elaborate set pieces in the form of wedding cakes. Astaire and her brother, dressed up as a small bride and groom, danced up and down the cakes and activated small electric lights and musical bells with their feet. They played a simple waltz through their dance steps. The siblings performed intermittently at first, with their mother Ann acting as their manager and costume designer. They gained additional training from the ballet school of the Metropolitan Opera and from American choreographer Ned Wayburn. Ann Astaire home schooled her children, with the exception of a stint in New Jersey, when Adele and Fred put their performance career on hold and attended regular school for two and half years. The adolescent Adele had grown so tall at the time that her smaller, younger brother, still catching up in height, looked awkward dancing with her.

After returning to the vaudeville circuit in 1911, Astaire and her brother struggled to find steady work for the next couple of years. Agents were initially uninterested in representing the relatively unknown pair. In 1913, Astaire's father introduced the siblings to Aurelio Coccia, an experienced dance instructor and showman. He taught several new dances to the young Astaires and developed a new, more mature vaudeville routine for them. Bookings became more frequent after this, as the pair gradually improved their act and reputation. In 1916, the siblings encountered a difficult year when the White Rats of America, a union of vaudeville performers, staged a workers' strike that spread nationally, creating tense working relations between performers and vaudeville managers. Astaire and her brother, although not union members, lost valuable income nonetheless, and their father, unlucky enough to be working at a Nebraska brewery when state-wide prohibition was approved, was unable to offer financial support. When the union strike finally ended, the Astaire siblings returned to work at last, achieving a highly successful season.

As they grew older, the contrasting personalities of the siblings grew more distinct. Adele was a "perennial live wire": lively, gregarious, and known for her raw frankness, along with her colorful swearing. Fred, the hardworking perfectionist, was quieter and constantly anxious about all the details of their day-to-day work. While Fred might come to a venue two hours early to prepare for their show, Adele was more likely to arrive only minutes before she was due on stage. Despite their differences in temperament, the siblings were close. Astaire affectionately nicknamed her younger brother "Moaning Minnie" for his tendency to worry about every possible thing that could go wrong.

== Broadway career (1917–1932) ==
In 1917, after Fred purchased a full-page advertisement on the back cover of Variety, the siblings landed a part in their first Broadway show, Lee Shubert's Over the Top. Adele was 21, while her brother was 18. The show opened on November 28, 1917, and the siblings received a weekly salary of $250 (equivalent to $6300 in 2025) for their assigned dance numbers and comedy skits. A critic from The New York Globe commented that the dancing of Adele and her brother was "one of the prettiest features of the show", and the production ran for 78 performances. To prepare for her work singing in Broadway musicals during the late 1910s and 1920s, she took voice lessons with Estelle Liebling who was the voice teacher of many famous singers at the Metropolitan Opera and on Broadway.

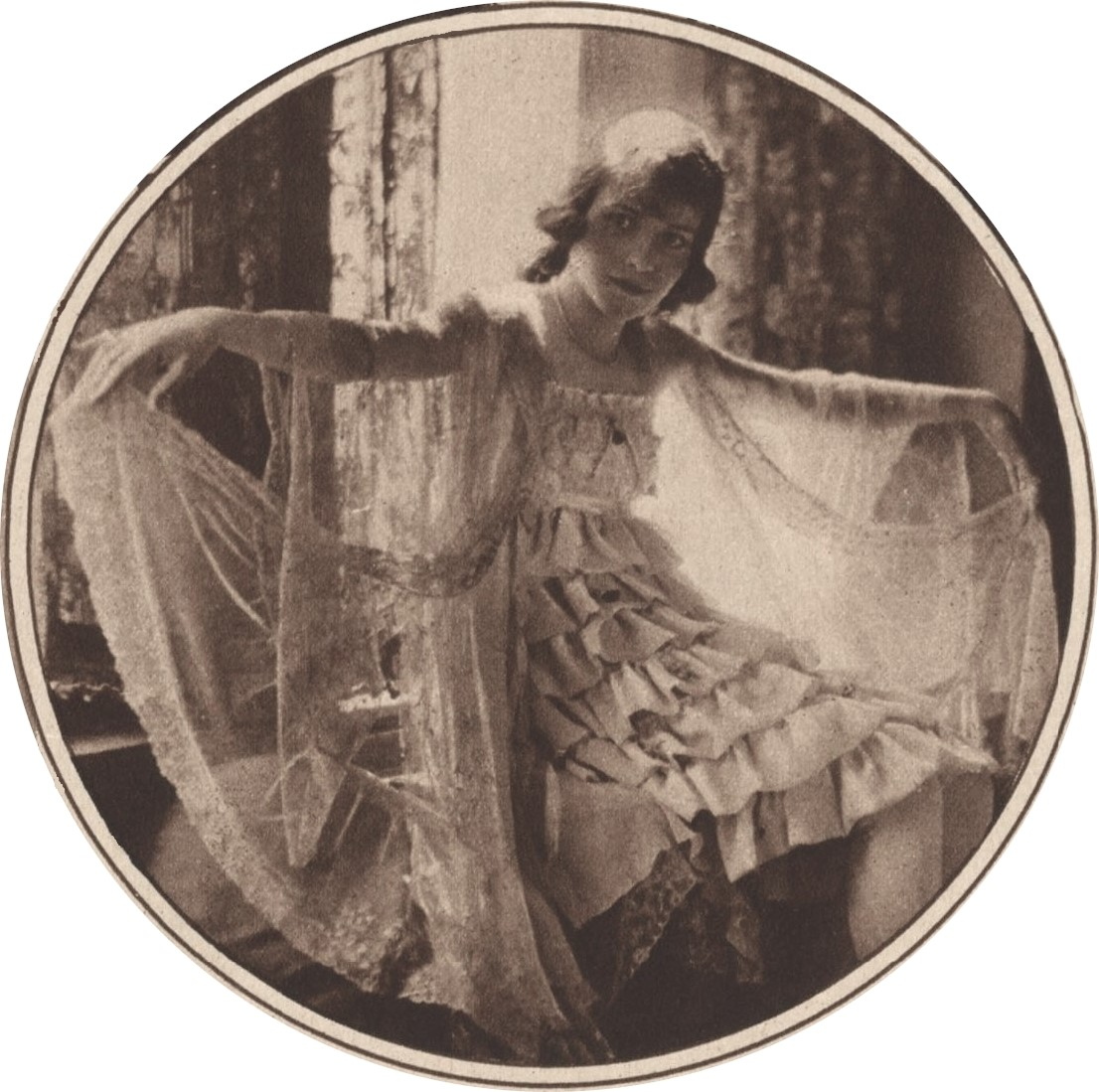
Astaire in costume for The Passing Show of 1918

Adele and Fred performed in The Passing Show of 1918, which ran for 125 performances. Astaire was given an opening solo, singing "I Really Can't Make My Feet Behave". In November 1919, the Astaires appeared in the operetta Apple Blossoms, beginning a professional relationship with Broadway producer Charles Dillingham. The show was successful, running for 256 performances. Fritz came to see his children perform. Their weekly salary was now $550, which rose to $750 (equivalent to $11800 & $12100 in 2025) when Apple Blossoms began its post-Broadway tour from September 1920 to April 1921. Unlike her brother, who struggled with shyness offstage, Astaire's outgoing personality made it easy for her to speak to reporters.

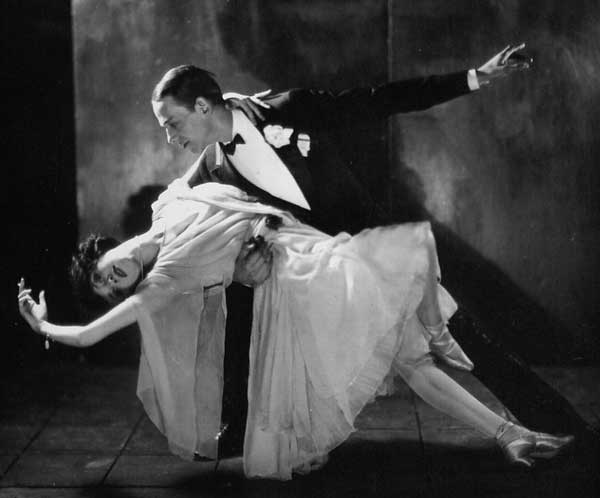
Astaire with her brother Fred (1921)

Although their next show The Love Letter was a commercial flop, opening in October 1921 and running for only 31 performances, Astaire and her brother continued to garner appreciation from audiences, and here they introduced what would become one of their signature exit moves, the Runaround. Standing shoulder to shoulder at the end of a dance number, the siblings would put their arms out as if grasping the handlebars of bicycles, running around the stage together in ever-growing circles while the orchestra played "a series of oompahs". At last, Adele and Fred would disappear into the wings. Audiences loved it. Fred attributed the popularity of the Runaround to his sister's comedic timing and expressions, and the siblings found ways to incorporate the move into almost every show of their subsequent career together. While visiting New York for the first time that year, English playwright Noël Coward saw The Love Letter and was impressed by the Astaires. He came to meet them backstage, urging them to consider taking their performances to London.

In 1922, Adele and Fred landed their first proper speaking roles in the Broadway musical For Goodness Sake, playing the best friends of the lead characters. They received positive reviews from critics, and sang the hit song "The Whichness of the Whatness", concluding the piece with their increasingly popular Runaround exit. With the success of this show, Fred began taking more of a lead in choreographing their routines. The siblings finally received star billing in the short-lived The Bunch and Judy, earning $1000 (equivalent to $19200 in 2025) weekly. Drama critic Heywood Broun called the Astaires "the most graceful and charming young dancers in the world of musical comedy".

As the siblings continued to rise professionally, Adele quickly became known for her comedic expressions and "adorably squeaky" soprano voice. She often ad-libbed onstage. She gave high-spirited performances, delighting audiences with her zany humor; Fred developed his own more understated style in response, dancing with a characteristic "pretence of nonchalance" that he would carry on using throughout his dancing career. Adele and her brother developed a dancing style involving complex steps performed rapidly and gracefully, often compared to "a whirlwind" by critics and audiences.

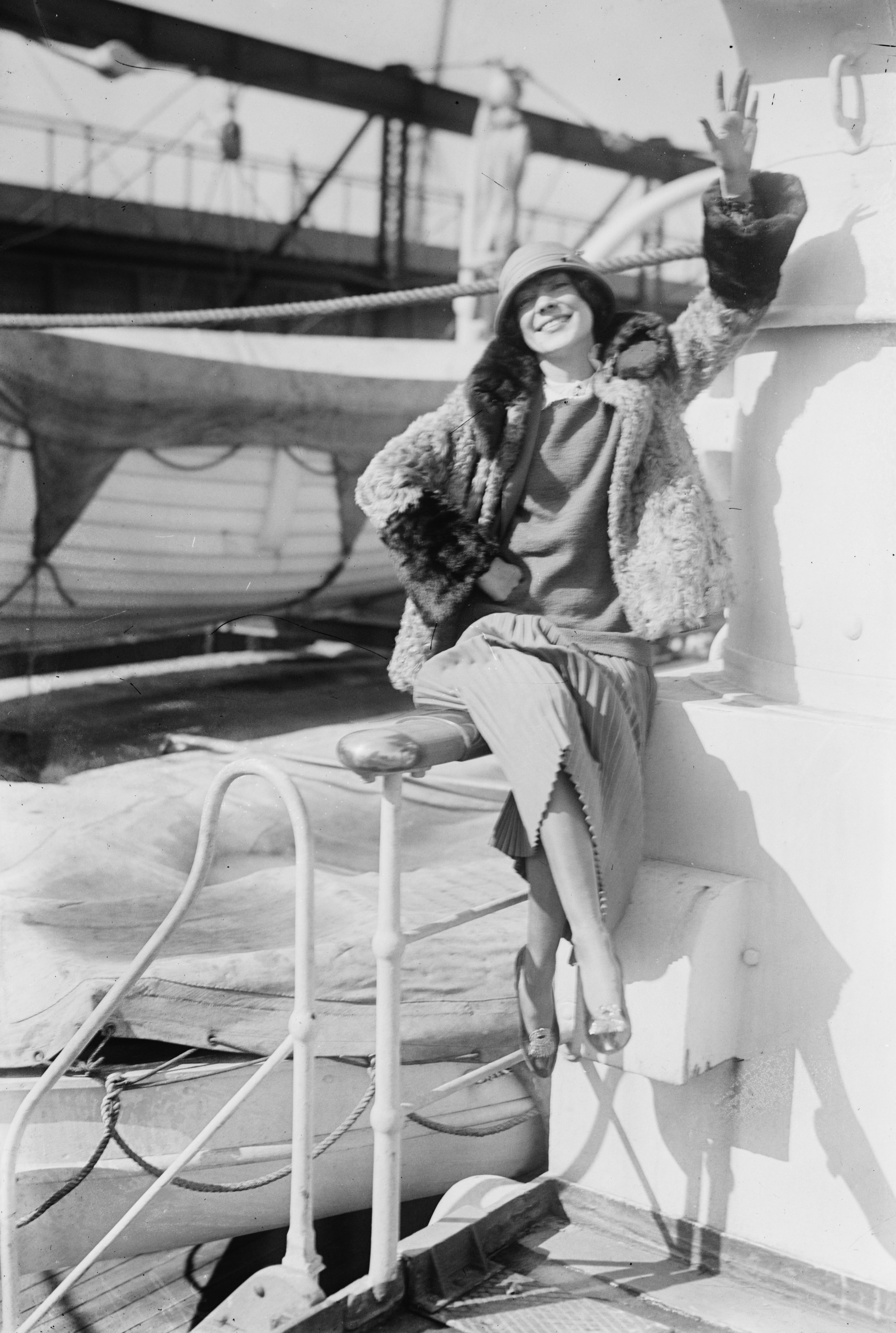
Adele aboard an ocean liner (photo undated, probably mid-1920s)

After the idea of performing overseas was suggested, Adele and Fred agreed to take For Goodness Sake (renamed Stop Flirting) to the West End in London. On May 30, 1923, their show opened at the Shaftesbury Theatre and received a standing ovation. Stop Flirting ran for 418 performances. It moved to the Queen's Theatre, followed by the Strand Theatre. The Prince of Wales attended the show ten times, and both he and his brother the Duke of York became friends with the siblings. Adele taught the prince some new tap dance steps, and the pair once danced together at a club. As the Astaires' popularity grew, both Adele and Fred were featured in major advertising campaigns. While in London, Peter Pan creator J. M. Barrie asked Adele to play his creation on stage, but contractual reasons forced her to turn down the part. In early 1924, Adele received word that her father, Fritz, had died from cancer.

Returning to New York in late 1924, Adele and her brother starred in Lady, Be Good!, the first Broadway musical scored entirely by George and Ira Gershwin. It was a hit with audiences, running for 330 performances. The siblings earned $1750 per week. One critic called Adele the most charming and entertaining musical actress seen "in many a moon". In the spring of 1926, Adele and her brother took Lady, Be Good! to London, opening at the Empire Theatre to enthusiastic reception. The siblings renewed their acquaintance with the British royal family, receiving an invitation from the Duke and Duchess of York to meet the newborn Princess Elizabeth. King George V and Queen Mary also made a special visit to see the Astaires perform.

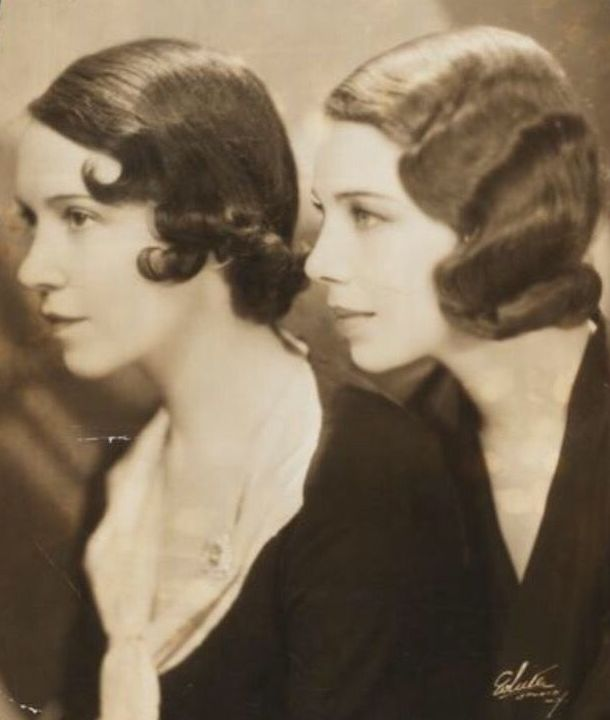
Astaire (left) with The Band Wagon co-star Tilly Losch

In 1927, Adele and Fred joined forces with the Gershwin brothers again in New York for their new musical Funny Face. The show was another hit. Shortly after the opening, the Astaires arranged for a film screen test with Paramount Pictures. The film studio hoped to feature Adele and her brother in a film version of Funny Face, but the siblings were both unsatisfied with the initial screen test results, and the project never went ahead. On the Broadway stage, Funny Face ran for 250 performances, closing only due to a summer heatwave in 1928 that made theaters too hot for audiences and performers. That summer, Adele was injured in an accident on Long Island when a motorboat engine exploded, scalding her upper body with burning oil. Although her career was put on hold for a few months, she made a full recovery.

The Astaires' London debut of Funny Face took place in November 1928. The show ran for 263 performances, and British newspapers hailed "another outbreak of 'Astairia'" as audiences embraced the American duo once again. On the night of their final performance in London, Adele was introduced to Lord Charles Cavendish, the second son of the 9th Duke of Devonshire. Cavendish was several years younger than Adele. The pair were quickly attracted to each other, spending time together in Paris before Adele returned to America with Fred. They met again soon afterwards when Cavendish came to New York and took a position with J.P. Morgan & Co.

Although their next show, Smiles (1930), was a commercial flop, Adele and her brother soon made their comeback with another hit, starring in their final Broadway show together, The Band Wagon, which opened on June 3, 1931, and ran for 260 performances. Other members of The Band Wagon's cast included Tilly Losch, Helen Broderick and Frank Morgan. Critics applauded the creative, decidedly modern writing and set design of the show, which included a custom-built "double revolve" turntable stage: the turntable revolved in two directions at once, revealing new scenes quickly and smoothly while the performers danced and sang.

== Retirement and first marriage (1932–1944) ==
After the two had been courting for some time, Adele proposed marriage to Charles Cavendish at a speakeasy named 21, and he accepted. She was tired of the relentless travel and rehearsals required of a performer, and had been considering retirement. For her, theatrical life had always been "an acquired taste... like olives".

In Chicago on March 5, 1932, after one final performance with Fred in The Band Wagon, Adele officially retired from the stage. She had been performing with her brother for 27 years. American drama critic Ashton Stevens declared her departure from theater a sad occasion, commenting that "Heaven doesn't send every generation an Adele Astaire". Following a farewell party, Adele and her mother boarded the RMS Majestic and sailed for London, while Fred remained in the United States to continue his career. Adele renewed a friendship with fellow passenger Winston Churchill, whom she had earlier met while performing in England, and the pair enjoyed games of backgammon together during the voyage. Upon the ship's docking in Plymouth, reporters attempted to ambush Adele and were deterred only by Churchill, who distracted them until Adele and her mother could disembark without harassment.

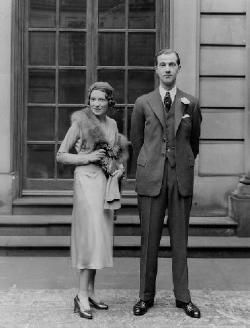
Adele and Lord Charles Cavendish (c. 1932)

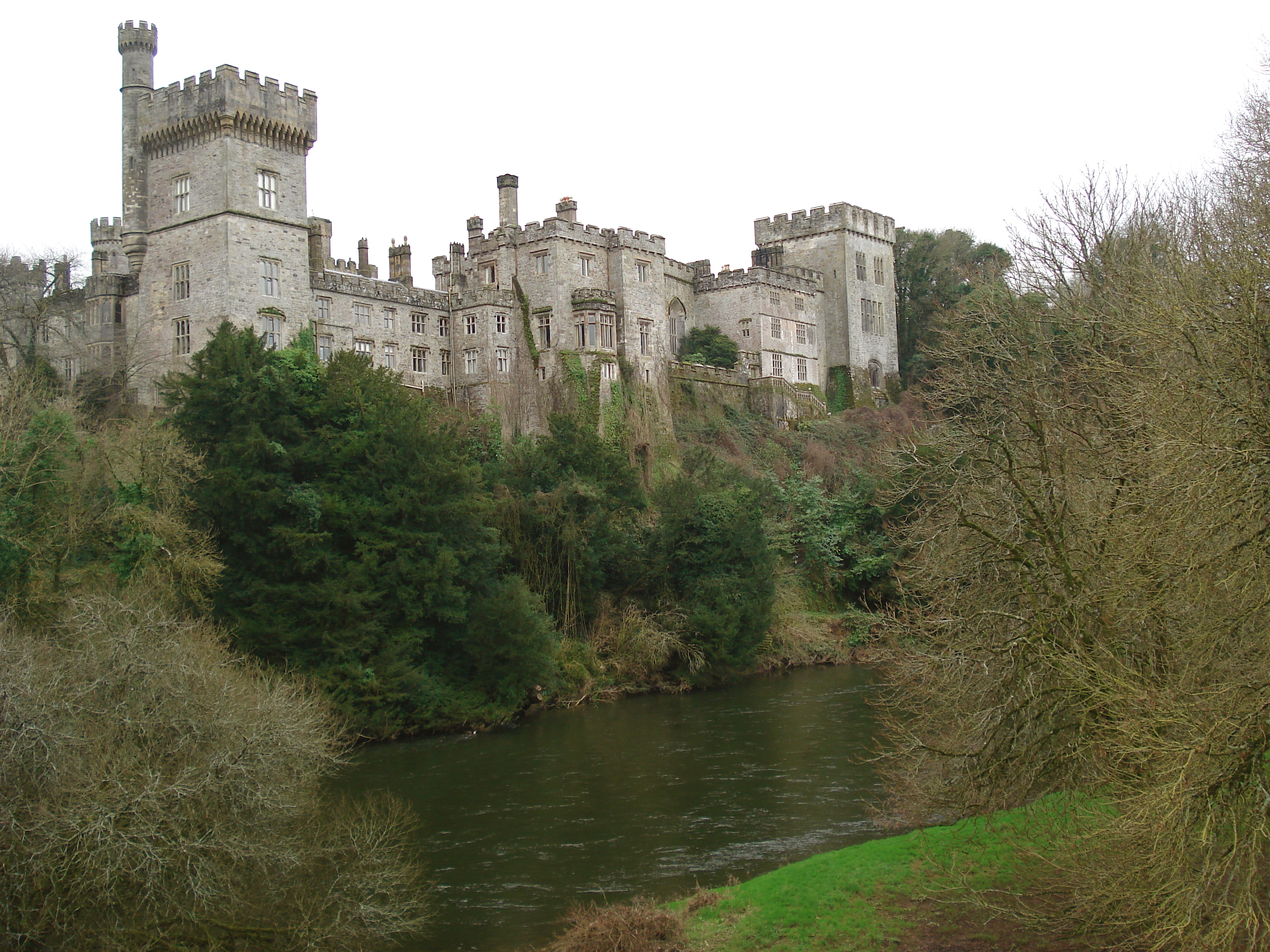
Lismore Castle

In April of that year, after rejoining Charles, Adele met the rest of the Cavendish family for the first time. Her future sister-in-law, Lady Mary Gascoyne-Cecil, later gleefully recollected Adele's colorful entrance: Adele was formally announced, quietly entered the room where the Cavendish family was waiting, and then launched herself into a series of cartwheels across the floor until she had reached her new relatives. Despite the initial reservations of Charles's mother, the Duchess of Devonshire, Adele was welcomed by the family. The wedding was briefly postponed when Charles was hospitalized for appendicitis, his ill health exacerbated by heavy drinking, but on May 9, 1932, Adele Astaire married Lord Charles Cavendish in the family's private chapel at Chatsworth, receiving the courtesy title of "Lady Charles". The couple moved to County Waterford in Ireland, where they lived at the family estate of Lismore Castle. Adele paid for the installation of several new, modern bathrooms to replace the castle's antiquated facilities, joking that this was her gift to the family in place of the more traditional dowries brought by rich, aristocratic heiresses. Back in the United States, Fred initially struggled to adjust to his new dancing partners; Adele sent Fred a teasing telegram right before the first performance of his new show, The Gay Divorce: "Now Minnie, don't forget to moan".

In 1933, Adele gave birth prematurely to a daughter, who did not survive. Two years later, she gave birth to stillborn twin sons. She struggled with periods of depression and an increasingly difficult home life. Charles grappled with severe alcoholism, spending periods of time in hospitals, nursing homes and German spas as he tried unsuccessfully to conquer his addiction. In 1936, American film producer David Selznick offered Adele a supporting role in his film Dark Victory, but she was unsatisfied with the screen tests and preoccupied with caring for her husband, ultimately declining the job offer. She turned down another film role from Selznick a year later. In 1939, Adele, aged forty-two, suffered a miscarriage in her third and final pregnancy.

In 1942, as Adele searched for ways to contribute to the wartime effort, she met Colonel Kingman Douglass, the American chief of U.S. Air Force Intelligence who was stationed in London. Douglass suggested that Adele work at the American Red Cross's 'Rainbow Corner' canteen, located near Piccadilly Circus. Adele agreed to his suggestion. Her mother, who had remained in Ireland to be near her daughter, now stayed home at Lismore to care for the often bed-ridden Charles, sending Adele regular updates. In London, Adele wrote letters home for soldiers, writing and posting up to 130 letters in a single week. She took shifts at the information desk, danced with soldiers, and helped the men shop for necessities while in London. After the London Blitz began, she increased her work hours and served at the Rainbow Corner seven days per week. Adele's wartime work gave her a renewed sense of purpose and fulfillment, helping her cope with recent personal difficulties.

In March 1944, Charles died as a result of long-term alcohol poisoning, aged 38. Adele received compassionate leave to attend his funeral at St. Carthage's, where Charles was buried near his children. Following his death, Adele turned down an offer from Irving Berlin to return to the stage in Annie Get Your Gun.

== Second marriage and later life (1947–1980) ==
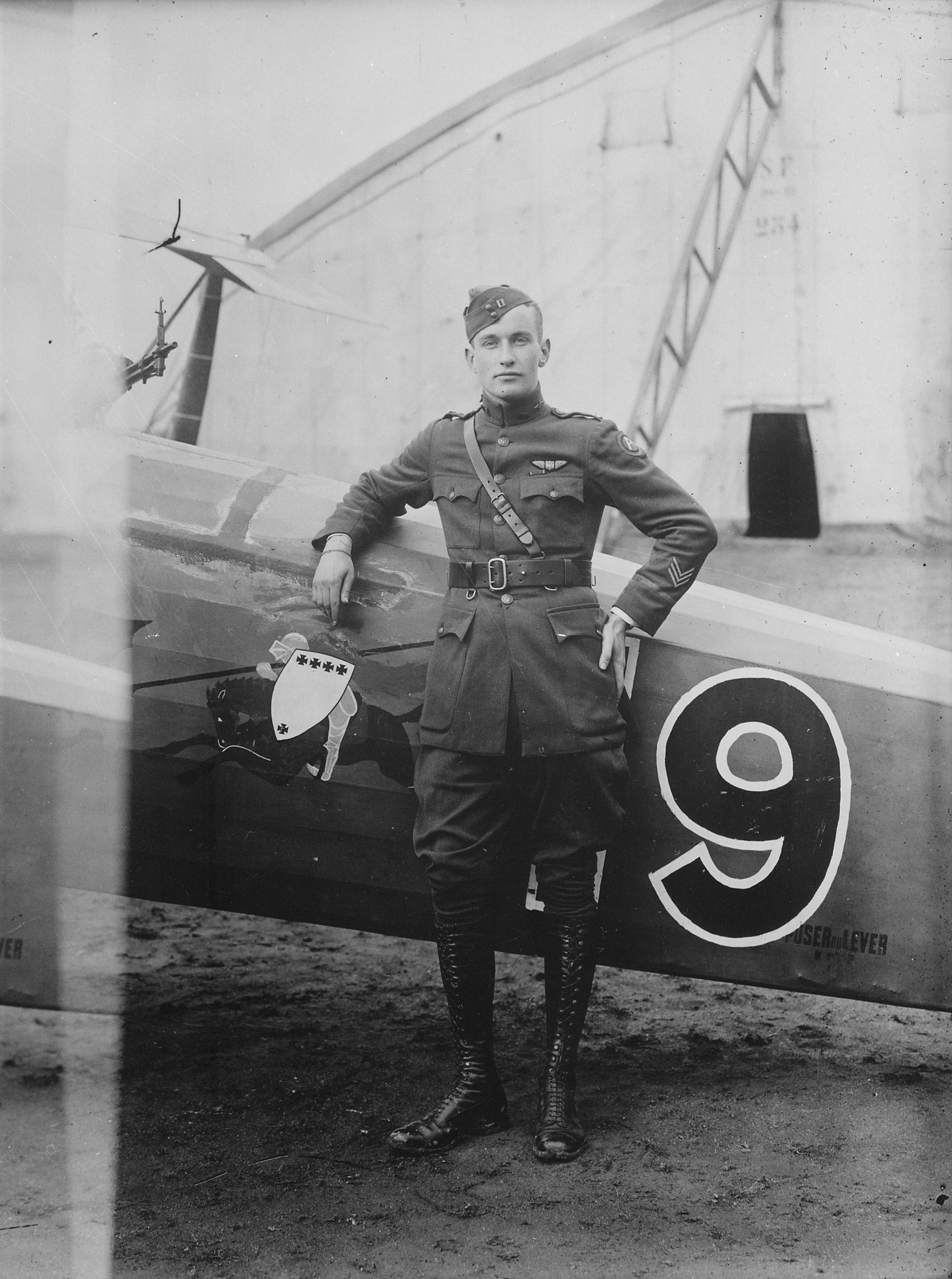
A young Kingman Douglass (c. 1918)

In April 1947, Adele remarried, this time to her old American acquaintance from the war, Kingman Douglass. Douglass, who had previously been married and divorced, now worked as an investment banker. He later briefly served as assistant director of the Central Intelligence Agency (CIA). Initially lacking the personal funds necessary to move back to America, Adele broke the news of her engagement to the Cavendish family in Ireland, and received their financial support to move on to the next stage of her life. She was also given permission to continue spending three months a year at Lismore Castle, provided that she helped contribute towards the upkeep of the property. Adele gained three stepsons from her marriage to Douglass. Aside from returning to Lismore Castle periodically, Adele and her new husband lived in New York, Virginia, and eventually Round Hill, Jamaica. Adele often entertained family and friends at her Jamaica home.

Adele remained retired from stage life. In 1953, authors P. G. Wodehouse and Guy Bolton, both fans of Adele, wrote a teasing epilogue for her and her brother Fred, who had successfully transitioned to film work after his Broadway career.

Adele closed her career with a triumphant performance in The Band Wagon ... She then married the Duke of Devonshire's second son and retired to Lismore Castle, leaving a gap that can never be filled. Fred struggled on without her for a while, but finally threw his hand in and disappeared. There is a rumour that he turned up in Hollywood. It was the best the poor chap could hope for after losing his brilliant sister.

In 1968, Douglass received injuries after being struck by a bus. Soon afterwards, he was injured again in a car accident. He died in 1971 due to a brain hemorrhage. Afterward, Adele moved to the Phoenix, Arizona area. Until 1979, she continued to spend summers at the castle in Ireland which she had shared with her first husband. Adele was known for her robust health, regularly jogging nearly every morning well into her late seventies. According to her relatives, Adele quickly overcame illnesses, soon getting back on her feet "and in Marine-type English, telling what she thought of the world." She remained close with her brother, Fred. They constantly exchanged letters, packages, and long-distance phone calls, often chatting about their favorite soap operas.

In November 1972, Adele and her brother were both inducted into the newly created American Theater Hall of Fame. In 1975, the Astaires' mother died at the age of 96.

== Death and legacy ==
Adele Astaire died on January 25, 1981, in Scottsdale Memorial Hospital, Scottsdale, Arizona, after suffering a stroke. She was 84. Some of her ashes were scattered in Ireland, by Lismore Castle and the graves of her children and first husband, while the rest were buried near her mother's grave in Chatsworth, California.

In the early 1980s, the Anglo-American Contemporary Dance Foundation created the Fred and Adele Astaire Awards to recognize outstanding Broadway dancers and choreographers. The Gottlieb Storz House in Omaha includes the "Adele and Fred Astaire Ballroom" on the top floor, which is the only memorial to the siblings' roots in Omaha. Although there is no surviving film footage of Astaire's Broadway performances, recordings do exist of her duets with Fred, George Vollaire and Bernard Clifton.
