= An American in Paris (film) =

1951 film by Vincente Minnelli

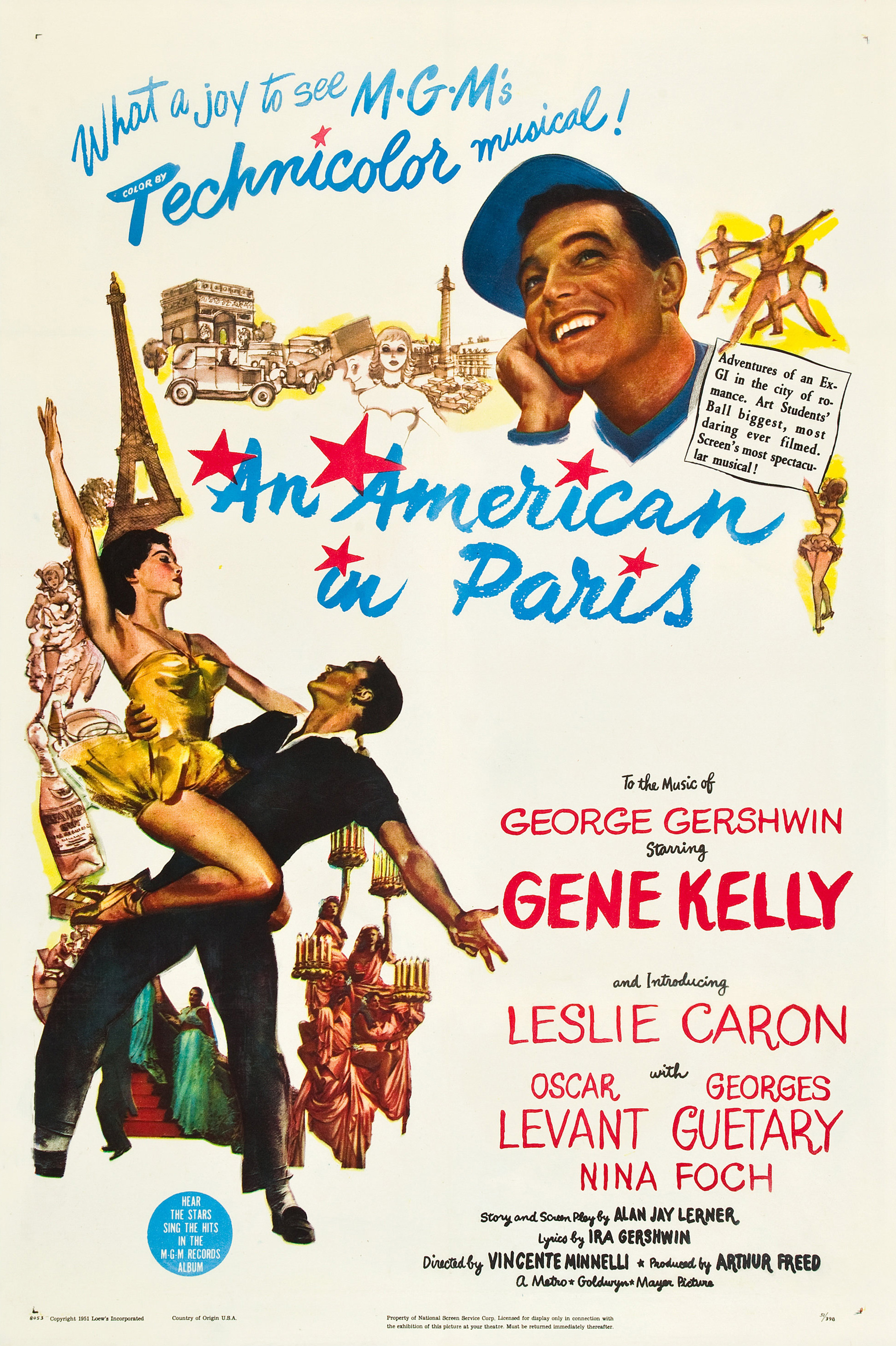
- Theatrical release poster
- Directed by: Vincente Minnelli
- Written by: Alan Jay Lerner
- Produced by: Arthur Freed
- Starring: Gene Kelly; Leslie Caron; Oscar Levant; Georges Guétary; Nina Foch
- Cinematography: Alfred Gilks; Ballet: John Alton
- Edited by: Adrienne Fazan
- Music by: George Gershwin; Lyrics: Ira Gershwin; Musical direction: Johnny Green; Saul Chaplin
- Production company: Metro-Goldwyn-Mayer
- Distributed by: Loew's Inc.
- Release dates: October 4, 1951 (New York); November 11, 1951 (USA)
- Running time: 113 minutes
- Country: United States
- Language: English
- Budget: $2.7 million
- Box office: $7 million

An American in Paris is a 1951 American musical romantic comedy film inspired by the 1928 jazz-influenced symphonic poem (or tone poem) An American in Paris by George Gershwin. Starring Gene Kelly, Leslie Caron (her film debut), Oscar Levant, Georges Guétary, and Nina Foch, the film is set in Paris and was directed by Vincente Minnelli from a script by Alan Jay Lerner. The music is by George Gershwin with lyrics by his brother Ira, with additional music by Johnny Green and Saul Chaplin, the music directors.

The story of the film is interspersed with dance numbers choreographed by Gene Kelly and set to Gershwin's music. Following the death of George Gershwin in 1937, George's brother Ira sold the Gershwin musical catalog to MGM executive Arthur Freed in the late 1940s. Some of the tunes in this catalog were included in the film, such as "I Got Rhythm" and "Love Is Here to Stay". Other songs in the movie include "I'll Build A Stairway to Paradise" and "'S Wonderful". The climax of the film is "The American in Paris" ballet, a 17-minute dialogue-free sequence featuring Kelly and Caron set to Gershwin's An American in Paris, with sets designed in the styles of various French artists. The ballet sequence cost nearly half a million dollars and was filmed on 44 sets on MGM's back lot. In an interview from 2009 with Paul O'Grady, Leslie Caron said the film ran into controversy with the Hays Office over part of her dance sequence with a chair; the censor reviewing the scene called it "sexually provocative", which surprised Caron, who asked "What can you do with a chair?"

An American in Paris was an enormous critical and financial success, garnering eight Academy Award nominations and winning six (including Best Picture), as well as earning other industry honors such as the inaugural Golden Globe Award for Best Motion Picture – Musical or Comedy. In 1993, the film was selected for preservation by the United States Library of Congress in the National Film Registry for being "culturally, historically, or aesthetically significant". It is ranked number nine among AFI's Greatest Movie Musicals.

== Plot ==
American World War II veteran Jerry Mulligan lives in Paris trying to succeed as an artist. His friend and neighbor Adam Cook is a struggling concert pianist and longtime associate of French singer Henri Baurel. At the ground-floor bar in their building, Henri tells Adam about his girlfriend, Lise Bouvier. Jerry then joins them before going out to try and sell his art.

Lonely heiress Milo Roberts notices Jerry displaying his work in Montmartre. She buys two paintings, then brings Jerry to her apartment to pay him. Jerry accepts an invitation to her dinner party for that evening, and on the way home, he sings "I Got Rhythm" with some local children. Upon discovering he is Milo's sole dinner guest, an offended Jerry says he is uninterested in being a paid escort. Milo insists she only wants to support his career.

At a crowded bar, Milo offers to sponsor an art show for Jerry. Milo's friends show up and while everyone is talking, Jerry notices a beautiful younger woman at the next table. He pretends they know each other and asks her to dance, unaware it is Lise, the girl Henri loves. Lise, uninterested in Jerry, rebuffs him, but Jerry persists. Milo is upset that Jerry flirted with another girl in her presence and abruptly leaves. In the car, she tearfully criticizes Jerry for being rude and inconsiderate.

The next day, Jerry calls Lise, but she tells him to leave her alone. Meanwhile, Milo has arranged a showing with a collector interested in Jerry's work. Before the meeting, Jerry goes to the parfumerie where Lise works, and his persistence finally wins her over. She agrees to meet him that evening but wants to avoid public places; they share a romantic song and dance along the banks of the Seine River ("Love Is Here to Stay"). Lise then rushes off to meet Henri after his performance ("I'll Build a Stairway to Paradise"). Henri tells Lise he is going on tour in America and proposes marriage to her.

Later Adam humorously daydreams he is performing Gershwin's Concerto in F for Piano and Orchestra in a concert hall. As the scene progresses, Adam is also the conductor, other musicians, and even an audience member enthusiastically applauding at the end.

Milo rents Jerry a lavish art studio and tells him she is planning an exhibition of his work in three months' time. Jerry initially refuses the studio but accepts on condition he will repay Milo when his work sells. After a month of courting, Jerry brings Lise to his apartment building. When Lise suddenly rushes off in a waiting taxi, Jerry is confused and complains to Adam, who realizes that Henri and Jerry are in love with the same girl. Henri and Jerry later discuss the girl they each love ("'S Wonderful") without realizing it is Lise.

That night, Jerry and Lise meet by the Seine. Lise informs him that she and Henri are to be married and will be going to America. Though Lise feels duty-bound to Henri for protecting her during the war, Jerry and Lise proclaim their love for each other before parting.

Dejected, Jerry invites Milo to the art students' masked ball, where they run into Henri and Lise. Jerry admits to Milo that he loves Lise. When Henri overhears Jerry and Lise saying goodbye, he realizes the truth. As Henri and Lise drive away, Jerry fantasizes through a diverse and extended dance scene with Lise all over Paris and set to Gershwin's An American in Paris. A car horn breaks Jerry's reverie as Henri releases Lise from their relationship and returns her to the ball. Jerry and Lise run into each other’s arms.

== Cast ==
Credits from the AFI Catalog of Feature Films:

- Gene Kelly as Jerry Mulligan
- Leslie Caron as Lise Bouvier
- Oscar Levant as Adam Cook
- Georges Guétary as Henri "Hank" Baurel
- Nina Foch as Milo Roberts

Uncredited

- Eugene Borden as Georges Mattieu
- Martha Bamattre as Mathilde Mattieu
- Hayden Rorke as Tommy Baldwin
- Paul Maxey as John McDowd
- Dick Wessel as Ben Macrow
- Noel Neill as Art student
- Benny Carter as Jazz bandleader
- Madge Blake as Edna Mae Bestram
- Ann Codee as Therese
- George Davis as François
- Judy Landon and Sue Casey as "Stairway to Paradise" dancers
- Dudley Field Malone as Winston Churchill lookalike

== Music and dance ==
Kelly and Caron dancing on the bank of the Seine

1. "Embraceable You" (from Girl Crazy) – Lise
2. "Nice Work If You Can Get It" (from A Damsel in Distress) – Hank
3. "By Strauss" (from The Show Is On) (Note: Vincente Minnelli heard the Gershwins playing a parody of Viennese waltzes in 1936 and asked them to compose a musical number for his upcoming revue The Show Is On. Kimball, Robert (1993). The Complete Lyrics of Ira Gershwin (First ed.). New York: Alfred A. Knopf. p. 279. ISBN 0-394-55651-8.) – Jerry, Hank, Adam
4. "I Got Rhythm" (from Girl Crazy)– Jerry
5. "Tra-la-la (This Time It's Really Love)" used in tryouts of For Goodness Sake (Note: For Goodness Sake is a 1922 musical with music primarily by William Daly Jr. and Paul Lannin (1894–1953), lyrics primarily by Arthur Jackson (1893–1922), and book by Fred Jackson. "Tra-la-la" is one of several songs the Gershwins contributed to the show, and the only one dropped before the Broadway run. The original sheet music was published as "Tra-la-la" in 1922, when Ira was using the pseudonym "Arthur Francis"; he modified the lyrics for An American in Paris, at which point the subtitle was added. Pollack, Howard (2006). George Gershwin: His Life and Work. Berkeley: University of California Press. pp. 265–266.) – Jerry, Adam
6. "Love Is Here to Stay" (from The Goldwyn Follies) – Jerry, Lise
7. "I'll Build a Stairway to Paradise" (from George White's Scandals of 1922) (Note: The lyrics of "Stairway to Paradise" are by Buddy DeSylva (as B.G. DeSylva) and Ira Gershwin (under his early pseudonym Arthur Francis).) – Hank
8. Concerto in F for Piano and Orchestra – Adam, The MGM Symphony Orchestra
9. "'S Wonderful" (from Funny Face) – Jerry, Hank
10. An American in Paris Ballet – Jerry, Lise, Ensemble

The 17-minute ballet sequence, with sets and costumes referencing French painters including Raoul Dufy, Pierre-Auguste Renoir, Maurice Utrillo, Henri Rousseau, and Toulouse-Lautrec, is the climax of the film, and it cost the studio approximately $450,000 to produce. Some of the backdrops for this sequence measured 300 feet (90 m) wide and 40 feet (12 m) high. Production on the film was halted on September 15, 1950. Minnelli left to direct another film, Father's Little Dividend. Upon completion of that film in late October, he returned to film the ballet sequence.

== Reception ==
=== Box office ===
According to MGM records, An American in Paris earned $3,750,000 in the United States and Canada and $3,231,000 in other countries during its initial theatrical release. This resulted in the studio making a $1,346,000 profit.

=== Critical reaction ===
Bosley Crowther of The New York Times gave a mostly positive review largely on the strength of the closing dance number which he called "one of the finest ever put upon the screen", as well as Leslie Caron's performance, writing that the film "takes on its own glow of magic when Miss Caron is on the screen. When she isn't, it bumps along slowly as a patched-up, conventional music show." Variety called the film "one of the most imaginative musical confections turned out by Hollywood in years ... Kelly is the picture's top star and rates every inch of his billing. His diversified dancing is great as ever and his thesping is standout." Harrison's Reports deemed it "an excellent entertainment, a delight to the eye and ear, presented in a way that will give all types of audiences extreme pleasure".

Richard L. Coe of The Washington Post called it "the best musical movie I've ever seen", praising its "spirit of crisp originality and sophistication rarely found in a screen musical". John McCarten of The New Yorker called it "a thoroughly pleasant musical film ... Never too tightly confined by its slender story, An American in Paris skips from love in the moonlight to handsome ballets with the greatest of ease, and Mr. Kelly is always ready, willing, and able to execute a tap dance." The Monthly Film Bulletin called it "merely a good musical, far more attractive than most, but considerably less than the material seemed to promise. This is due in part to unimaginative use of the Paris settings—a very obvious tourist's view—and to the rather curious way in which the story, after building up interest in Jerry's painting and in his one-man show, simply shelves the whole issue."

During the film's 1992 re-release, Roger Ebert gave the film three-and-a-half stars out of four and wrote: "The real reasons to see An American in Paris are for the Kelly dance sequences, the closing ballet, the Gershwin songs, the bright locations, and a few moments of the ineffable, always curiously sad charm of Oscar Levant." Howard Reich for the Chicago Tribune gave the film four complete stars and wrote it "remains one of the supreme romantic musicals." In 2011, James Berardinelli wrote that it "falls into the category of a weak Oscar winner. The movie is enjoyable enough to watch, but it represents a poor choice as the standard-bearer of the 1951 roster ... It's a fine, fun film with a lot of great songs and dancing but there's nothing about this production that causes it to stand out when compared to one of dozens of musicals from the era."

On review aggregator Rotten Tomatoes, An American in Paris holds a score of 95% based on 101 reviews, with an average rating of 8.1/10. The website's critics consensus reads, "The plot may be problematic, but such concerns are rendered superfluous by Gene Kelly and Leslie Caron's star power, the Gershwins' classic songs, and Vincente Minnelli's colorful, sympathetic direction." On Metacritic, it holds a weighted average score of 83 out of 100 based on 18 critics, indicating "universal acclaim".

== Awards and honors ==
Award	Category	Nominee(s)	Result
Academy Awards	Best Motion Picture	Arthur Freed	Won
Academy Awards	Best Director	Vincente Minnelli	Nominated
Academy Awards	Best Story and Screenplay	Alan Jay Lerner	Won
Academy Awards	Best Art Direction – Color	Art Direction: Cedric Gibbons and E. Preston Ames; Set Decoration: Edwin B. Willis and F. Keogh Gleason	Won
Academy Awards	Best Cinematography – Color	John Alton and Alfred Gilks	Won
Academy Awards	Best Costume Design – Color	Orry-Kelly, Walter Plunkett and Irene Sharaff	Won
Academy Awards	Best Film Editing	Adrienne Fazan	Nominated
Academy Awards	Best Scoring of a Musical Picture	Saul Chaplin and Johnny Green	Won
Academy Awards	Academy Honorary Award	Gene Kelly	Won
British Academy Film Awards	Best Film from any Source		Nominated
Cannes Film Festival	Grand Prix	Vincente Minnelli	Nominated
Directors Guild of America Awards	Outstanding Directorial Achievement in Motion Pictures	Vincente Minnelli	Nominated
Golden Globe Awards	Best Motion Picture – Musical or Comedy		Won
Golden Globe Awards	Best Actor in a Motion Picture – Musical or Comedy	Gene Kelly	Nominated
Golden Globe Awards	Best Director – Motion Picture	Vincente Minnelli	Nominated
National Board of Review Awards	Top Ten Films		3rd Place
National Film Preservation Board	National Film Registry		Inducted
Writers Guild of America Awards	Best Written American Musical	Alan Jay Lerner	Won

Gene Kelly received an Academy Honorary Award that year for "his versatility as an actor, singer, director, and dancer, and specifically for his brilliant achievements in the art of choreography on film". It was his only Oscar.

In 1993 An American in Paris was selected for preservation in the United States National Film Registry as being "culturally, historically, or aesthetically significant".

American Film Institute recognition

- 1998: AFI's 100 Years...100 Movies – #68
- 2002: AFI's 100 Years...100 Passions – #39
- 2004: AFI's 100 Years...100 Songs – #32
  - "I Got Rhythm"
- 2006: AFI's Greatest Movie Musicals – #9

AFI also honored star Kelly as #15 of the top 25 American male screen legends.

== Digital restoration ==
In 2011 the film was digitally restored by Warner Bros. for its 60th anniversary; so far this version is only available via DCP (Digital Cinema Package).

== Stage adaptations ==
=== 2008 adaptation ===
A stage version of the musical was adapted by Ken Ludwig and began previews at the Alley Theatre in Houston on April 29, 2008, officially opening on May 18 and running through June 22. The production, directed by Alley artistic director Gregory Boyd with choreography by Randy Skinner, starred Harry Groener and Kerry O'Malley. The musical had many of the film's original songs and also incorporated other Gershwin songs, such as "They All Laughed", "Let's Call the Whole Thing Off", and "Love Walked In".

=== 2014 adaptation ===
In 2014 a stage adaptation premiered in Paris at the Théâtre du Châtelet with Robert Fairchild as Jerry Mulligan and Leanne Cope as Lise Bouvier (here renamed Lise Dassin and turned into an aspiring ballet dancer). The production, which ran from November 2014 to January 2015, was directed and choreographed by Christopher Wheeldon, written by Craig Lucas, and designed by Bob Crowley. The musical then transferred to Broadway with previews at Palace Theatre beginning on March 13, 2015, before officially opening there on April 12.

== In popular culture ==
The epilogue of the 2016 musical film La La Land references the set design and costuming of An American in Paris, which director Damien Chazelle called "a movie that we just pillaged".

In The Boys season 3 finale, Soldier Boy (Jensen Ackles) reminisces about starring in his own biopic, which lost the Oscar for Best Picture to An American in Paris.
