= Tra-la-la =

Song composed by George and Ira Gershwin

Song

from the album For Goodness Sake
- Released: February 21, 1922
- Genre: show tune
- Label: Harms, Inc.
- Composer: George Gershwin
- Lyricist: Ira Gershwin
- Producer: Alex A. Aarons

"Tra-la-la" is a song composed by George and Ira Gershwin for the 1922 Broadway show For Goodness Sake, produced by frequent Gershwin collaborator Alex A. Aarons. It was published by Harms, Inc. (1922, plate 6456-3), with lyrics credited to "Arthur Francis," the pseudonym (derived from the names of his two youngest siblings) that Ira Gershwin used through 1923.

The song was one of four Gershwin contributions in For Goodness Sake, (Note: For Goodness Sake has music primarily by William Daly Jr. and Paul Lannin (1894–1953), lyrics primarily by Arthur Jackson, and book by Fred Jackson. In addition to "Tra-la-la," the Gershwins also supplied the songs "Someone" (published in 1922) and "All to Myself" (part of the music of which is preserved in a piano medley from the show). Additionally, Arthur Jackson and Ira were co-lyricists of "French Pastry Walk," which has music by Lannin and Daly (also published in 1922), and which was used in the 2015 musical A Damsel in Distress.) which is the first show to feature the Gershwins' work along with Fred and Adele Astaire. Edward Jablonski considered "Tra-la-la" to be "the show's best Gershwin song," which was sung not by the Astaires, "not yet full-fledged stars," but rather the leads, Marjorie Gateson (as Vivian Reynolds) and John E. Hazzard (as Perry Reynolds). Howard Pollack reports that the character of Count Spinagio (played by Charles Judels) also sang in the number; the Internet Broadway Database says it was sung by all three characters and the ensemble. Pollack wrote that the song was cut before the Broadway opening, which occurred on 20 February 1922, but the other secondary literature does not indicate the song was dropped. It was possibly cut during the Broadway run. (Note: A program of For Goodness Sake from the week beginning Monday, 17 April 1922 does not list "Tra-la-la" in its running order (page 15). Library of Congress, Ira and Leonore S. Gershwin Trust Archive, Box 62, Folder 14.)

Richard Crawford wrote of the song: "Few, if any, Gershwin songs are as square-cut as this one. At the same time, his usual attention to harmony and voice-leading is revealed—in the verse's descending chromatic line of whole notes in the accompaniment's middle voice, in the refrain bass line's firm melodic shape, and in the clarity of the overall harmonic plan."

Ira Gershwin revised the lyric for the 1951 Academy Award-winning film An American in Paris, in which it was listed as "Tra-la-la (This Time It's Really Love)." Ira was pleased with the film and, leading up to its premiere, wrote: "Some of the songs like 'By Strauss,' 'Love Is Here to Stay,' 'Tra-La-La' and a couple of others aren't well known but will be easy to take." Jablonski and Lawrence D. Stewart wrote that the "spirited song" was "rewritten to good advantage." Howard Pollack noted that Ira "took advantage" of the song's previous "obscurity by reviving it as a duet for the love-smitten Jerry Mulligan (Gene Kelly) and his cynical friend Adam Cook (Oscar Levant) [...] Although Kelly performed the number—sounding impressively fresh for 1951—with his inimitable bonhomie, one missed the fine integration of the earlier lyric—which concerned singing away one's troubles, not falling in love—with [George] Gershwin's gaily folkish music." Nathan Platte called "Tra-la-la" a "less familiar song rendered utterly charming through its performance by Adam and Jerry."

== Sources ==
- Crawford, Richard (2019). Summertime: George Gershwin’s Life in Music. W.W. Norton & Company.
- Jablonski, Edward (1998). Gershwin. Da Capo Press.
- Jablonski, Edward; Stewart, Lawrence D. (1996). The Gershwin Years: George and Ira. Da Capo Press.
- Kimball, Robert (1993). The Complete Lyrics of Ira Gershwin (First ed.). New York: Alfred A. Knopf. ISBN 0-394-55651-8.
- Owen, Michael (2025). Ira Gershwin: A Life in Words. Livewright Publishing Corporation.
- Pollack, Howard (2006). George Gershwin: His Life and Work. Berkeley: University of California Press.
