= By Strauss =

Song by George and Ira Gershwin

Song by George Gershwin
- Composer: George Gershwin
- Lyricist: Ira Gershwin

"By Strauss" is a 1936 song composed by George Gershwin, with lyrics by Ira Gershwin. It pays homage to the music of Johann Strauss, Sr. and Johann Strauss, Jr.

== Lyrics ==
The singer sings how he doesn't like Broadway, Irving Berlin, Jerome Kern, Cole Porter and - in a case of self-mockery - George Gershwin. Instead he wants to dance to waltzes by father and son Strauss. The lyrics reference three of Strauss's best known compositions, namely An der schönen blauen Donau ("Let the Danube flow along"), Die Fledermaus ("and the Fledermaus") and Wein, Weib und Gesang ("Keep the wine and give me song").

== History ==
After hearing the Gershwins perform an early version of the song at private parties, Vincente Minnelli included it in his 1936 revue The Show Is On, where it was introduced by Gracie Barrie and Robert Shafter.

It was then performed by Gene Kelly, Georges Guétary, and Oscar Levant (dubbed by Mack McLean) in Minnelli's 1951 film An American in Paris. Ira Gershwin was pleased with the film and, leading up to its premiere, wrote: "Some of the songs like 'By Strauss,' 'Love Is Here to Stay,' 'Tra-La-La' and a couple of others aren't well known but will be easy to take."

The song was also featured in the 2012 musical Nice Work If You Can Get It, performed by the character Estonia Dulworth in a counterpoint with a reprise of "Sweet and Low-Down".

== Notable recordings ==
Many other artists have also recorded the song. Among them:

- Ella Fitzgerald - Ella Fitzgerald Sings the George and Ira Gershwin Songbook (1959)
- Kenny Clarke/Francy Boland Big Band - All Smiles (1968)
- Tony Jay - Poets on Broadway (2005)
