= Tra la la =

Tra la la, tra-la-la or tralala may refer to:

== Fictional characters ==
- Tra La La, one of the Breezies from the My Little Pony franchise
- Tralalero Tralala, a fictional character originating from AI-generated images associated with Italian brainrot

== Music ==
- Tra-la-la, a 1922 song by George and Ira Gershwin
- Tra La La La La, a 1962 song by Ike Turner
- The Tra La La Song (One Banana, Two Banana)
- Tralala, a 1984 song by Phill & Company, notably adapted into the 2004 song Ding Dong Song by Günther

== Other uses ==
- Tra La La!, an interjection used by Captain Underpants

== See also ==
- Trallalero
- Tralla La
- Trololo
- Talala (disambiguation)
