= Fred Astaire chronology of performances =

Performances by American dancer and musician

This is a chronological listing of Fred Astaire stage, motion picture, radio, and television performances.

The following color-coding is used for these different mediums:

| stage | motion pictures | radio | television |

== 1905–1920 ==
| Title | Date | Theatre | Role | Dance Partner | Director | Lyrics | Music |
|---|---|---|---|---|---|---|---|
| Juvenile Artists Presenting an Electric Musical Toe-Dancing Novelty | 1905 | Keyport, New Jersey (location of performance) | Himself | Adele Astaire | | | |
| Orpheum Circuit | 1906 | (2 tours) | Himself | Adele Astaire | | | |
| Benefit Performance - Rainy Saturday | 1911 | Proctor's 5th Avenue | Himself | Adele Astaire | | | |
| Aurelia and Minnie Coccia Tour (vaudeville) | 1913 | (tour) | Himself | Adele Astaire | | | |
| Interstate Circuit | c.1914 | (tour in Texas) | Himself | Adele Astaire | | | |
| Orpheum Circuit | c. 1915 | (tour) | Himself | Adele Astaire | | | |
| Over the Top | Nov. 28 1917 | 44th St. Roof | Himself | Adele Astaire | Joseph Herbert | Charles Manning; Matthew Woodward | Sigmund Romberg; Herman Timberg |
| The Passing Show of 1918 | July 25, 1918 | Winter Garden | Himself | Adele Astaire | J.C. Huffman | Harold R. Atteridge | Sigmund Romberg; Jean Schwartz |
| Apple Blossoms | Oct. 7 1919 | Globe | Johnnie | Adele Astaire | Fred Latham | William LeBaron | Fritz Kreisler; Victor Jacobi |

== 1921–1930 ==
Note: British productions are marked with (United Kingdom) .

| Title | Date | Theatre | Role | Dance Partner | Director | Lyrics | Music |
|---|---|---|---|---|---|---|---|
| The Love Letter | Oct. 4 1921 | Globe | Richard Kolner | Adele Astaire | Edward Royce | William LeBaron | Victor Jacobi |
| For Goodness Sake | Feb. 20 1922 | Lyric | Teddy Lawrence | Adele Astaire | Priestley Morrison | Arthur Jackson | William Daly; Paul Lannin |
| The Bunch and Judy | Nov. 28 1922 | Globe | Gerald Lane | Adele Astaire | Fred Latham | Anne Caldwell | Jerome Kern |
| (United Kingdom); Stop Flirting (For Goodness Sake) | May 30, 1923 | Queen's | Teddy Lawrence | Adele Astaire | Felix Edwardes | Arthur Jackson | William Daly; Paul Lannin |
| Lady, Be Good | Dec. 1 1924 | Liberty | Dick Trevor | Adele Astaire | Felix Edwardes | Ira Gershwin | George Gershwin |
| (United Kingdom); Lady, Be Good | Apr. 14 1926 | Empire | Dick Trevor | Adele Astaire | Felix Edwardes | Ira Gershwin | George Gershwin |
| Funny Face | Nov. 22 1927 | Alvin | Jimmie Reeves | Adele Astaire | Edward MacGregor | Ira Gershwin | George Gershwin |
| (United Kingdom); Funny Face | Nov. 8 1928 | Prince's | Jimmie Reeves | Adele Astaire | Felix Edwardes | Ira Gershwin | George Gershwin |
| Smiles | Nov. 18 1930 | Ziegfeld | Bob Hastings | Adele Astaire; Marilyn Miller | William Anthony McGuire | Clifford Grey; Harold Adamson; Ring Lardner | Vincent Youmans |

== 1931–1940 ==
Note: British productions are marked with (United Kingdom) .

| Title | Date | Theatre, Studio, or Network | Role | Dance Partner | Director | Lyrics | Music |
|---|---|---|---|---|---|---|---|
| The Band Wagon | June 3, 1931 | New Amsterdam | Himself | Adele Astaire; Tilly Losch | Hassard Short | Howard Dietz | Arthur Schwartz |
| Gay Divorce | Nov. 29 1932 | Ethel Barrymore | Guy Holden | Claire Luce | Howard Lindsay | Cole Porter | |
| (United Kingdom); Gay Divorce | Nov. 2 1933 | Palace | Guy Holden | Claire Luce | Felix Edwardes | Cole Porter | |
| Dancing Lady | Dec. 2, 1933 | MGM | Himself | Joan Crawford | Robert Z. Leonard | Harold Adamson; Dorothy Fields; Lorenz Hart; Arthur Freed | Burton Lane; Jimmy McHugh; Richard Rodgers; Nacio Herb Brown |
| Flying Down to Rio | Dec. 20, 1933 | RKO | Fred Ayres | Dolores del Río; Ginger Rogers | Thornton Freeland | Edward Eliscu & Gus Kahn | Vincent Youmans |
| The Gay Divorcee | Oct. 3, 1934 | RKO | Guy Holden | Ginger Rogers | Mark Sandrich | Cole Porter; Herb Magidson; Mack Gordon | Cole Porter |
| Roberta | Feb. 12, 1935 | RKO | Huckleberry Haines | Ginger Rogers | William A. Seiter | Otto Harbach; Dorothy Fields | Jerome Kern |
| Your Hit Parade | Aug. 12 1935 | NBC | Himself | — | — | — | — |
| Top Hat | Aug. 16, 1935 | RKO | Jerry Travers | Ginger Rogers | Mark Sandrich | Irving Berlin | |
| Follow the Fleet | Feb. 19, 1936 | RKO | Bake Baker | Ginger Rogers | Mark Sandrich | Irving Berlin | |
| Swing Time | Aug. 26, 1936 | RKO | "Lucky" Garnett | Ginger Rogers | George Stevens | Dorothy Fields | Jerome Kern |
| The Packard Hour | Sept. 15 1936 | NBC | Himself (Host) | — | — | — | — |
| Shall We Dance | Apr. 30, 1937 | RKO | Peter P. Peters | Ginger Rogers | Mark Sandrich | Ira Gershwin | George Gershwin |
| A Damsel in Distress | Nov. 20, 1937 | RKO | Jerry Halliday | George Burns & Gracie Allen; Joan Fontaine | George Stevens | Ira Gershwin | George Gershwin |
| Carefree | Aug. 30, 1938 | RKO | Tony Flagg | Ginger Rogers | Mark Sandrich | Irving Berlin | |
| The Screen Guild Theater (Episode: "Miss Brown of Worcester") | Jan. 15 1939 | NBC | Jerry Gale | Loretta Young; Herbert Marshall | Ernst Lubitsch | Oscar Bradley | |
| The Story of Vernon and Irene Castle | Mar. 31, 1939 | RKO | Vernon Castle | Ginger Rogers | H.C. Potter | (numerous composers) | |
| Broadway Melody of 1940 | Feb. 14, 1940 | MGM | Johnny Brett | Eleanor Powell; George Murphy | Norman Taurog | Cole Porter | |
| Second Chorus | Dec. 3, 1940 | Paramount | Danny O'Neill | Paulette Goddard | H.C. Potter | Johnny Mercer | Artie Shaw; Bernard Hanighen; Hal Borne |

== 1941–1950 ==
| Title | Date | Studio or Network | Role | Dance Partner and/or Co-Star | Director | Lyrics | Music |
|---|---|---|---|---|---|---|---|
| You'll Never Get Rich | Sept. 25, 1941 | Columbia | Robert Curtis | Rita Hayworth | Sidney Lanfield | Cole Porter | |
| Holiday Inn | Aug. 4, 1942 | Paramount | Ted Hanover | Bing Crosby; Marjorie Reynolds; Virginia Dale | Mark Sandrich | Irving Berlin | |
| You Were Never Lovelier | Nov. 19, 1942 | Columbia | Robert "Bob" Davis | Rita Hayworth | William A. Seiter | Johnny Mercer | Jerome Kern |
| The Screen Guild Theater (Episode: "Holiday Inn") | Jan. 11, 1943 | NBC | Ted Hanover | Bing Crosby; Dinah Shore | — | Irving Berlin | |
| The Eddie Cantor Show | April 28, 1943 | CBS | Himself | Eddie Cantor; Lucille Ball; Desi Arnaz | — | — | — |
| The Sky's the Limit | July 13, 1943 | RKO | Fred Atwell | Joan Leslie | Edward H. Griffith | Johnny Mercer | Harold Arlen |
| Ziegfeld Follies | Aug. 13, 1945 | MGM | Fred Astaire; Raffles; Tai Long | Lucille Bremer | Vincente Minnelli | (numerous lyricists and composers) | |
| Yolanda and the Thief | Nov. 20, 1945 | MGM | Johnny Riggs | Lucille Bremer | Vincente Minnelli | Arthur Freed | Harry Warren |
| Blue Skies | Oct. 16, 1946 | Paramount | Jed Potter | Bing Crosby; Joan Caulfield | Stuart Heisler | Irving Berlin | |
| The Bob Hope Show | Feb. 17 1948 | NBC | Himself | Bob Hope | — | — | — |
| Easter Parade | June 30, 1948 | MGM | Don Hewes | Judy Garland; Ann Miller | Charles Walters | Irving Berlin | |
| The Barkleys of Broadway | May 4, 1949 | MGM | Josh Barkley | Ginger Rogers | Charles Walters | Ira Gershwin | Harry Warren |
| Some of the Best | June 23, 1949 | MGM | Himself | — | — | — | — |
| Three Little Words | July 12, 1950 | MGM | Bert Kalmar | Red Skelton; Vera-Ellen | Richard Thorpe | Bert Kalmar | Harry Ruby |
| Let's Dance | Nov. 29, 1950 | Paramount | Donald Elwood | Betty Hutton | Norman Z. McLeod | Frank Loesser | |

== 1951–1960 ==
| Title | Date | Studio or Network | Role | Dance Partner and/or Co-Star | Director | Lyrics | Music |
|---|---|---|---|---|---|---|---|
| Royal Wedding | Mar. 8, 1951 | MGM | Tom Bowen | Jane Powell | Stanley Donen | Alan Jay Lerner | Burton Lane |
| The Screen Guild Theater (Episode: "Easter Parade") | Mar. 22 1951 | ABC | Don Hewes | Judy Garland | — | Irving Berlin | |
| The Belle of New York | Feb. 22, 1952 | MGM | Charles Hill | Vera-Ellen | Charles Walters | Johnny Mercer | Harry Warren |
| The Band Wagon | Aug. 7, 1953 | MGM | Tony Hunter | Cyd Charisse | Vincente Minnelli | Howard Dietz | Arthur Schwartz |
| The Ed Sullivan Show | Feb. 14 1954 | CBS | Himself | Ed Sullivan | — | — | — |
| The Ed Sullivan Show | Apr. 3, 1955 | CBS | Himself | Ed Sullivan; Sammy Davis Jr. | — | — | — |
| What's My Line? | Apr. 3, 1955 | CBS | Himself (Mystery Guest) | — | Franklin Heller | — | — |
| Daddy Long Legs | May 4, 1955 | 20th Century Fox | Jervis Pendleton III | Leslie Caron | Jean Negulesco | Johnny Mercer | |
| Funny Face | Feb. 17, 1957 | Paramount | Dick Avery | Audrey Hepburn | Stanley Donen | Ira Gershwin | Leonard Gershe |
| The Ed Sullivan Show | Mar. 3, 1957 | CBS | Himself | — | — | — | — |
| The Ed Sullivan Show | Apr. 7, 1957 | CBS | Himself | — | — | — | — |
| Person to Person | June 7, 1957 | CBS | Himself | — | Franklin J. Schaffner | — | — |
| Silk Stockings | July 18, 1957 | MGM | Steve Canfield | Cyd Charisse | Rouben Mamoulian | Cole Porter | |
| Home | July 25, 1957 | NBC | Himself | — | — | — | |
| General Electric Theater (Episode: "Imp on a Cobweb Leash") | Dec. 3, 1957 | CBS | Paul Ashcroft | Joan Tetzel | Robert B. Sinclair | — | — |
| The 30th Annual Academy Awards | Mar. 28 1958 | NBC | Himself (Co-Presenter: Best Foreign Language Film) | Dana Wynter | Alan Handley | — | — |
| What's My Line? | June 8, 1958 | CBS | Himself (Mystery Guest) | — | Franklin Heller | — | — |
| An Evening with Fred Astaire | Oct. 17, 1958 | NBC | Himself | Barrie Chase | Bud Yorkin | — | — |
| The Ed Sullivan Show | June 28, 1959 | CBS | Himself | — | — | — | — |
| General Electric Theater (Episode: "Man on a Bicycle") | Sept. 3, 1959 | CBS | J. Willingham Bardley | Stanley Adams | Herschel Daugherty | — | — |
| Another Evening with Fred Astaire | Nov. 4, 1959 | NBC | Himself | Barrie Chase | Bud Yorkin | — | — |
| On the Beach | Dec. 17, 1959 | United Artists | Julian Osborne | Gregory Peck; Ava Gardner | Stanley Kramer | — | — |
| The Steve Allen Show; 10th Annual Magazine Awards | Dec. 28, 1959 | NBC | Himself (Recipient) | Steve Allen | — | — | — |
| The Steve Allen Show | June 20, 1960 | NBC | Himself | Steve Allen | — | — | — |
| Astaire Time | Sept. 28, 1960 | NBC | Himself | Barrie Chase | Greg Garrison | — | — |

== 1961–1970 ==
| Title | Date | Studio or Network | Role | Co-Star | Director |
|---|---|---|---|---|---|
| The Pleasure of His Company | June 1, 1961 | Paramount | Biddeford "Pogo" Poole | Debbie Reynolds | George Seaton |
| Alcoa Premiere (Episode: "Mr. Easy") | Feb. 13, 1962 | ABC | Andrew E. Whitbeck | Joanna Barnes | John Newland |
| The 34th Annual Academy Awards | Apr. 9, 1962 | ABC | Himself (Presenter: Best Picture) | — | Richard Dunlap |
| The Notorious Landlady | June 26, 1962 | Columbia | Franklyn Ambruster | Kim Novak; Jack Lemmon | Richard Quine |
| Alcoa Premiere (Episode: "Moment of Decision") | July 10, 1962 | ABC | Alex Berringer | Maureen O'Sullivan | John Newland |
| Here's Hollywood | Sept. 27, 1962 | NBC | Himself | — | — |
| Alcoa Premiere (Episode: "Guest in the House") | Oct.11, 1962 | ABC | Ivor St. George | Lloyd Bochner | Ted Post |
| Alcoa Premiere (Episode: "Mr. Lucifer") | Nov. 11, 1962 | ABC | Mr. Lucifer | Elizabeth Montgomery | Alan Crosland Jr. |
| Alcoa Premiere (Episode: "Blues for a Hanging") | Dec. 27, 1962 | ABC | Alex Berringer | Janis Paige | Bernard Girard |
| Bob Hope Presents the Chrysler Theatre (Episode: "Think Pretty") | Oct. 2, 1964 | NBC | Fred Addams | Barrie Chase | Jack Arnold |
| The 37th Annual Academy Awards | Apr. 5, 1965 | ABC | Himself (Presenter: Best Original Song) | — | Richard Dunlap |
| The Hollywood Palace | Oct 2, 1965 | ABC | Himself (Host/Singer/Dancer) | Margot Fonteyn; Paul Lynde | Grey Lockwood |
| Dr. Kildare (Episode: "Going Home") | Nov. 22, 1965 | NBC | Joe Quinlen | Richard Chamberlain; Raymond Massey | Herschel Daugherty |
| Dr. Kildare (Episode: "The Tent Dwellers") | Nov. 23, 1965 | NBC | Joe Quinlen | Richard Chamberlain; Raymond Massey | Herschel Daugherty |
| Dr. Kildare (Episode: "A Gift of Love") | Nov. 29, 1965 | NBC | Joe Quinlen | Richard Chamberlain; Raymond Massey | Herschel Daugherty |
| Dr. Kildare (Episode: "Fathers and Daughters") | Nov. 30, 1965 | NBC | Joe Quinlen | Richard Chamberlain; Raymond Massey | Herschel Daugherty |
| The Hollywood Palace | Jan. 22, 1966 | ABC | Himself (Host/Singer/Dancer) | Petula Clark; Mickey Rooney | Grey Lockwood |
| The Hollywood Palace | Mar. 12, 1966 | ABC | Himself (Host/Singer/Dancer) | Ethel Merman; Jack Jones | Grey Lockwood |
| The Hollywood Palace | Apr. 30, 1966 | ABC | Himself (Host/Singer/Dancer) | Herb Alpert; Louis Nye | Grey Lockwood |
| The 39th Annual Academy Awards | Apr. 10, 1967 | ABC | Himself (Co-Presenter: Writing Awards) | Ginger Rogers | Richard Dunlap |
| The Fred Astaire Show | Feb 7, 1968 | NBC | Himself | Barrie Chase; Simon & Garfunkel | Robert Scheerer |
| Finian's Rainbow | Oct. 9, 1968 | Warner Bros. | Finian McLonergan | Petula Clark; Tommy Steele | Francis Ford Coppola |
| Midas Run | May 15, 1969 | Cinerama Releasing | John Pedley | Anne Heywood; Richard Crenna | Alf Kjellin |
| It Takes a Thief (Episode: "The Great Casino Caper") | Oct. 16, 1969 | ABC | Alistair Mundy | Robert Wagner | Jack Arnold |
| It Takes a Thief (Episode: "The Three Virgins in Rome") | Nov. 6, 1969 | ABC | Alistair Mundy | Robert Wagner | Jack Arnold |
| It Takes a Thief (Episode: "The Second Time Around") | Dec. 4, 1969 | ABC | Alistair Mundy | Robert Wagner | Gerd Oswald |
| It Takes a Thief (Episode: "An Evening With Alistair Mundy") | Mar. 9, 1970 | ABC | Alistair Mundy | Robert Wagner | Jack Arnold |
| It Takes a Thief (Episode: "Beyond a Treasonable Doubt") | Mar. 16, 1970 | ABC | Alistair Mundy (voice only, uncredited) | Robert Wagner | Jack Arnold |
| The 42nd Annual Academy Awards | Apr. 7, 1970 | ABC | Himself (Presenter: Best Supporting Actress, Documentary Awards) | — | Jack Haley Jr. |
| The Dick Cavett Show | Nov. 10, 1970 | ABC | Himself | Dick Cavett | — |
| The Over-the-Hill Gang Rides Again | Nov 17, 1970 | ABC | The Baltimore Kid | Walter Brennan; Edgar Buchanan | George McCowan |
| Santa Claus Is Comin' to Town | Dec. 14, 1970 | ABC | S.D. Kluger (Narrator) - Voice Only | Mickey Rooney | Jules Bass; Arthur Rankin Jr. |

== 1971–1980 ==
| Title | Date | Studio or Network | Role | Co-Star | Director |
|---|---|---|---|---|---|
| 'S Wonderful, 'S Marvelous, 'S Gershwin | Jan. 17, 1972 | NBC | Himself | Jack Lemmon; Ethel Merman; Leslie Uggams | Martin Charnin; Walter C. Miller |
| Make Mine Red, White and Blue | Sept. 2, 1972 | NBC | Himself (Host) | The 5th Dimension; Michelle Lee | Bill Hobin; Hal Alexander |
| Imagine | Dec. 23, 1972 | ABC | Himself (Guest appearance) | John Lennon; Yoko Ono | Steve Gebhardt; John Lennon; Yoko Ono |
| Magnavox Presents Frank Sinatra | Nov. 18, 1973 | NBC | Himself (Audience member) | Frank Sinatra | Marty Pasetta |
| That's Entertainment! | May 23, 1974 | MGM | Himself (Co-host) | — | Jack Haley Jr. |
| Fred Astaire Salutes the Fox Musicals | Oct. 24, 1974 | ABC | Himself (Host) | — | Marc Breaux |
| The Towering Inferno | Dec. 14, 1974 | Warner Bros. 20th Century-Fox | Harlee Claiborne | Steve McQueen; Paul Newman; Jennifer Jones | John Guillermin |
| The Merv Griffin Show | Mar. 17, 1975 | Syndication | Himself | Merv Griffin | — |
| At Long Last Cole | Apr. 10, 1975 | ABC | Himself | — | Ronald Lyon |
| The 29th Annual Tony Awards | Apr. 20, 1975 | ABC | Himself (Presenter: Best Supporting Actress, Musical) | — | Clark Jones |
| The Tonight Show Starring Johnny Carson | Oct. 27, 1975 | NBC | Himself | Johnny Carson | — |
| Merry Christmas, Fred, from the Crosby's | Dec. 3, 1975 | CBS | Himself | Bing Crosby | Dwight Hemion |
| The Lion Roars Again | 1975 | MGM | Himself | — | Jack Haley Jr. |
| Parkinson | Feb. 14, 1976 | BBC1 | Himself | Michael Parkinson | — |
| The Mike Douglas Show | Feb. 20, 1976 | CBS | Himself | Mike Douglas | — |
| The Tonight Show Starring Johnny Carson | May 4, 1976 | NBC | Himself | Johnny Carson | — |
| That's Entertainment, Part II | May 16, 1976 | MGM | Himself (Co-host) | Gene Kelly | Gene Kelly |
| Dinah! | Nov. 19, 1976 | ABC | Himself | Dinah Shore | — |
| The Amazing Dobermans | Nov. 19, 1976 | Golden Films | Daniel Hughes | James Franciscus; Barbara Eden | Byron Ross Chudnow |
| The Easter Bunny Is Comin' to Town | Apr. 6, 1977 | ABC | S.D. Kluger (Narrator) - Voice Only | Skip Hinnant | Jules Bass; Arthur Rankin Jr. |
| The Purple Taxi (French title: Un taxi mauve) | May 21, 1977 | ParaFrance | Dr. Scully | Charlotte Rampling; Philippe Noiret | Yves Boisset |
| The 50th Annual Academy Awards | Apr. 3, 1978 | ABC | Himself (Presenter: Best Original Song) | — | Marty Pasetta |
| The Tonight Show Starring Johnny Carson | Apr. 5, 1978 | NBC | Himself | Johnny Carson | — |
| A Family Upside Down | Apr. 9, 1978 | NBC | Ted Long | Helen Hayes | David Lowell Rich |
| Bing Crosby: His Life and Legend | May 25, 1978 | ABC | Himself | Bing Crosby | Marshall Flaum |
| The 1st Kennedy Center Honors | Dec. 5, 1978 | CBS | Himself (Honoree) | — | Don Mischer |
| The 36th Annual Golden Globe Awards | Jan. 27, 1979 | NBC | Himself (Presenter: Henrietta Award) | — | |
| Battlestar Galactica (Episode: "The Man with Nine Lives") | Jan. 28, 1979 | ABC | Chameleon/Captain Dimitri | Richard Hatch; Dirk Benedict | Rod Holcomb |
| The Tonight Show Starring Johnny Carson | Dec. 21, 1979 | NBC | Himself | Johnny Carson | — |
| The Man in the Santa Claus Suit | Dec. 23, 1979 | NBC | Costume Shop Proprietor / Chauffeur / Hot Dog Vendor / Policeman / Cab Driver / Jeweler / Floor Walker / Choral Director / Santa Claus | Gary Burghoff; John Byner; Bert Convy | Corey Allen |
| Bob Hope's Overseas Christmas Tours: Around the World with the Troops - 1941-1972 | Feb. 3, 1980 | NBC | Himself | Bob Hope | Malcolm Leo |
| Fred Astaire: Puttin' on His Top Hat | Mar. 10, 1980 | PBS | Himself | — | David Heeley |
| Fred Astaire: Change Partners and Dance | Mar. 14, 1980 | PBS | Himself | — | David Heeley |

== 1981–1987 ==
| Title | Date | Studio or Network | Role | Co-Star | Director |
|---|---|---|---|---|---|
| The American Film Institute Salute to Fred Astaire | Apr. 18, 1981 | CBS | Himself (Honoree) | David Niven (Host) | Marty Pasetta |
| Ghost Story | Dec. 18, 1981 | Universal | Ricky Hawthorne | John Houseman; Melvyn Douglas; Douglas Fairbanks Jr. | John Irvin |
| The American Film Institute Salute to Lillian Gish | Apr. 17, 1984 | CBS | Himself | Lillian Gish | — |
| George Stevens: A Filmmaker's Journey | Sept. 25, 1984 | Castle Hill | Himself | — | George Stevens Jr. |
| The American Film Institute Salute to Gene Kelly | May 7, 1985 | CBS | Himself | Gene Kelly | Don Mischer |
| All-Star Party for 'Dutch' Reagan | Dec. 8, 1985 | CBS | Himself | Ronald Reagan | Dick McDonough |
| The RKO Story: Tales from Hollywood (Episode: "Let's Face the Music and Dance") | July 10, 1987 | BBC | Himself | — | — |
| American Masters (Episode: "George Gershwin Remembered") | Aug. 24, 1987 | PBS | Gentleman in The Babbit and the Bromide | Gene Kelly (in this routine) | — |
| The Tonight Show Starring Johnny Carson; 25th Anniversary Special | Oct. 1, 1987 | NBC | Himself (archive footage) | Johnny Carson | — |

== Sources ==
- Fred Astaire at IMDb
- Fred Astaire at the TCM Movie Database
- Fred Astaire at the Internet Broadway Database
- Green, Stanley, & Burt Goldblatt. Starring Fred Astaire, Dodd 1973, ISBN 0-396-06877-4
- Mueller, John. Astaire Dancing — The Musical Films of Fred Astaire, Knopf 1985, ISBN 0-394-51654-0
