= An American in Paris =

1928 composition by George Gershwin

- by George Gershwin
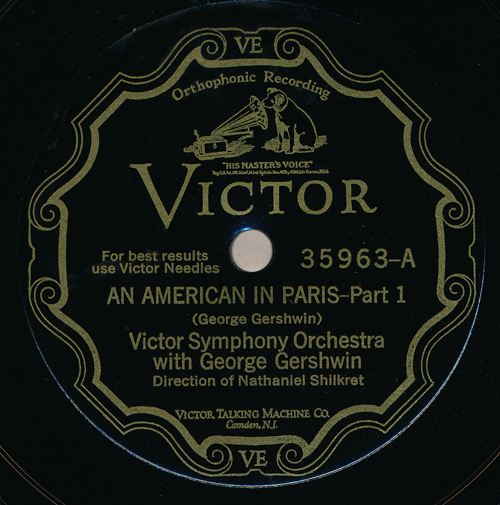
- First recording
- Genre: Orchestral jazz
- Form: Rhapsody
- Composed: Spring 1928

Premiere
- Date: December 13, 1928
- Location: Carnegie Hall, New York City
- Conductor: Walter Damrosch
- Performers: New York Philharmonic

An American in Paris is a jazz-influenced symphonic poem (or tone poem) for orchestra by American composer George Gershwin first performed in 1928. It was inspired by the time that Gershwin had spent in Paris and evokes the sights and energy of the French capital during the Années folles.

Gershwin scored the piece for the standard instruments of the symphony orchestra plus celesta, saxophones, and automobile horns. He brought back four Parisian taxi horns for the New York premiere of the composition, which took place on December 13, 1928, in Carnegie Hall, with Walter Damrosch conducting the New York Philharmonic. It was Damrosch who had commissioned Gershwin to write his Concerto in F following the earlier success of Rhapsody in Blue (1924). He completed the orchestration on November 18, less than four weeks before the work's premiere. He collaborated on the original program notes with critic and composer Deems Taylor.

On January 1, 2025, An American in Paris entered the public domain in the United States.

== Background ==
Although the story has never been verified, Gershwin is said to have been attracted by Maurice Ravel's unusual chords, and Gershwin went on his first trip to Paris in 1925, hoping to study with Ravel. After his initial student audition with Ravel turned into a sharing of musical theories, Ravel said he could not teach him, saying, "Why be a second-rate Ravel when you can be a first-rate Gershwin?"

Gershwin strongly encouraged Ravel to tour the United States. To this end, upon his return to New York, Gershwin joined the efforts of Ravel's friend Robert Schmitz, a pianist Ravel had met during the war, to urge Ravel to tour America. Schmitz was the head of Pro Musica, promoting Franco-American musical relations, and was able to offer Ravel a $10,000 fee for the tour, an enticement Gershwin knew Ravel would find appealing.

Ravel arrived in New York in March 1928. Gershwin attended a birthday party held for Ravel by Éva Gauthier. Ravel's tour reignited Gershwin's desire to return to Paris, which he and his brother Ira did after meeting Ravel. Ravel's high praise of Gershwin in an introductory letter to Nadia Boulanger caused Gershwin to seriously consider taking much more time to study abroad in Paris. Yet, after he played for her, she told him she could not teach him. Boulanger gave Gershwin basically the same advice she gave all her accomplished master students: "What could I give you that you haven't already got?" This did not set Gershwin back, as his real intent abroad was to complete a new work based on Paris and perhaps a second rhapsody for piano and orchestra to follow his Rhapsody in Blue. Paris at this time hosted many expatriate writers, among them Ezra Pound, W. B. Yeats, Ernest Hemingway, F. Scott Fitzgerald and artist Pablo Picasso.

== Composition ==
Themes of An American in Paris and melody fragment from La Sorella

Gershwin based An American in Paris on a melodic fragment called "Very Parisienne", written in 1926 on his first visit to Paris as a gift to his hosts, Robert and Mabel Schirmer. Gershwin called it "a rhapsodic ballet"; it is written freely and in a much more modern idiom than his prior works.

Gershwin explained in Musical America, "My purpose here is to portray the impressions of an American visitor in Paris as he strolls about the city, listens to the various street noises, and absorbs the French atmosphere."

The piece is structured into five sections, which culminate in a loose A–B–A format. Gershwin's first A episode introduces the two main "walking" themes in the "Allegretto grazioso" and develops a third theme in the "Subito con brio". The style of this A section is written in the typical French style of composers Claude Debussy and Les Six. This A section featured duple meter, singsong rhythms, and diatonic melodies with the sounds of oboe, English horn, and taxi horns. It also includes a melody fragment of the song "La Sorella" by Charles Borel-Clerc (1879–1959) (published in 1905).

The B section's "Andante ma con ritmo deciso" introduces the American Blues and spasms of homesickness. The "Allegro" that follows continues to express homesickness in a faster twelve-bar blues. In the B section, Gershwin uses common time, syncopated rhythms, and bluesy melodies with the sounds of trumpet, saxophone, and snare drum. "Moderato con grazia" is the last A section that returns to the themes set in A. After recapitulating the "walking" themes, Gershwin overlays the slow blues theme from section B in the final "Grandioso".

== Response ==
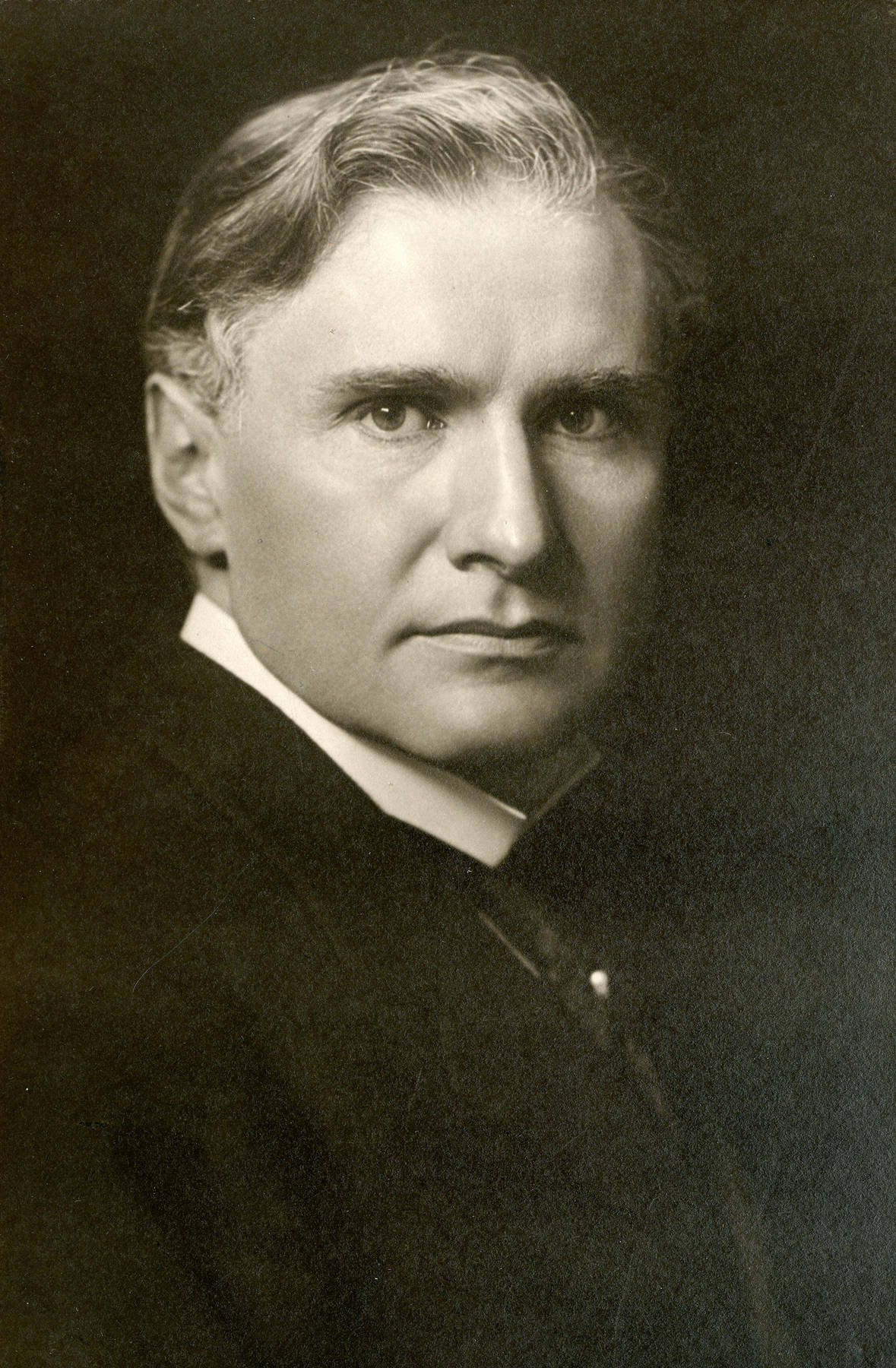
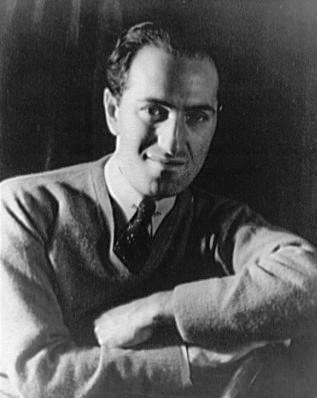
Conductor Walter Damrosch (left) and composer George Gershwin (right)

Gershwin did not particularly like Walter Damrosch's interpretation at the world premiere of An American in Paris. He stated that Damrosch's sluggish, dragging tempo caused him to walk out of the hall during a matinee performance of this work. The audience, according to Edward Cushing, responded with "a demonstration of enthusiasm impressively genuine in contrast to the conventional applause which new music, good and bad, ordinarily arouses."

Critics believed that An American in Paris was better crafted than Gershwin's Concerto in F. Evening Post did not think it belonged in a program with classical composers César Franck, Richard Wagner, or Guillaume Lekeu on its premiere. Gershwin responded to the critics:

It's not a Beethoven Symphony, you know... It's a humorous piece, nothing solemn about it. It's not intended to draw tears. If it pleases symphony audiences as a light, jolly piece, a series of impressions musically expressed, it succeeds.

== Instrumentation ==
An American in Paris was originally scored for 3 flutes (3rd doubling on piccolo), 2 oboes, English horn, 2 clarinets in B-flat, bass clarinet in B-flat, 2 bassoons, 4 horns in F, 3 trumpets in B-flat, 3 trombones, tuba, timpani, snare drum, bass drum, triangle, wood block, ratchet, cymbals, low and high tom-toms, xylophone, glockenspiel, celesta, 4 taxi horns labeled as A, B, C, and D with circles around them (but tuned as follows: A=Ab, B=Bb, C=D, and D=low A), alto saxophone, tenor saxophone, baritone saxophone (all doubling soprano and alto saxophones), and strings. Although most modern audiences have heard the taxi horns using the incorrect notes of A, B, C, and D, it had been Gershwin's intention to use the notes A♭_{4}, B♭_{4}, D_{5}, and A_{3}. It is likely that in labeling the taxi horns as A, B, C, and D with circles, he was referring to the four horns, and not the notes that they played. The correct tuning of the horns in sequence = D horn = low A, A horn = Ab an octave higher, B horn = Bb just above the Ab, and C horn = high D above the Bb.

The work was not the first orchestral use an automobile horn. "Flivver Ten Million" by American composer Frederick Converse appeared in 1927, with one early performance being on 17 December 1927 by an early incarnation of the Syracuse Symphony Orchestra, following a Boston Symphony Orchestra premiere on 16 April.

A major revision of the work by composer and arranger F. Campbell-Watson simplified the instrumentation by reducing the saxophones to only three instruments: alto, tenor and baritone; the soprano and alto saxophone doublings were eliminated to avoid changing instruments. (Note: Compare the original 1930 publication and Frank Campbell-Watson revision, both published by New World Music Corporation (New York); the date on both publications is 1930, although the revision is ca. 1942. The original is reprinted by Musikproduktion Hoeflich (Munich), Repertoire Explorer No. 4007 (2018), although James Dalton's preface incorrectly states this reprint has the Campbell-Watson revisions. The relevant saxophone passages may be found on pages 76–94 in both scores.) This became the standard performing edition until 2000, when Gershwin specialist Jack Gibbons made his own restoration of the original orchestration of An American in Paris, working directly from Gershwin's original manuscript, including the restoration of Gershwin's soprano saxophone parts removed in Campbell-Watson's revision. Gibbons' restored orchestration of An American in Paris was performed at London's Queen Elizabeth Hall on July 9, 2000, by the City of Oxford Orchestra conducted by Levon Parikian.

William Daly arranged the score for piano solo; this was published by New World Music in 1929.

== Preservation status ==
On September 22, 2013, it was announced that a musicological critical edition of the full orchestral score would be eventually released. The Gershwin family, working in conjunction with the Library of Congress and the University of Michigan, were working to make scores available to the public that represent Gershwin's true intent. It was unknown whether the critical score would include the four minutes of material Gershwin later deleted from the work (such as the restatement of the blues theme after the faster 12 bar blues section), or if the score would document changes in the orchestration during Gershwin's composition process.

The score to An American in Paris was scheduled to be issued first in a series of scores to be released. The entire project was expected to take 30 to 40 years to complete, but An American in Paris was planned to be an early volume in the series.

Two urtext editions of the work were published by the German publisher B-Note Music in 2015. The changes made by Campbell-Watson were withdrawn in both editions. In the extended urtext, 120 bars of music were re-integrated. Conductor Walter Damrosch had cut them shortly before the first performance.

On September 9, 2017, The Cincinnati Symphony Orchestra gave the world premiere of the long-awaited critical edition of the piece prepared by Mark Clague, director of the Gershwin initiative at the University of Michigan. This performance was of the original 1928 orchestration.

As of August 2025, the authorized critical edition of An American in Paris edited by Mark Clague has now been published by Schott Music. It appears in two-volumes. Volume 1A presents the “Final” Edition which represents the ending state of George Gershwin's handwritten score as prepared for the February 4, 1929, recording sessions with the “Victor Orchestra” as supervised by the composer. Five cuts were made in part to allow the music to fit on four sides of two 78-rpm discs. A second “Uncut” Edition of the score (Vol. 1B) represents George Gershwin's handwritten score as labeled “completed” by the composer on November 18, 1928, and presented to conductor Walter Damrosch for the work's New York Philharmonic premiere. Compared to Volume 1A, Volume 1B contains an additional 112 measures or some 3.5 minutes of music that are not present in the 1929 recording. Both editions were recorded by the Cincinnati Symphony in 2019 on the album Transatlantic and were nominated for a Grammy Award.

== Recordings ==
An American in Paris has been frequently recorded. The first recording was made for the Victor Talking Machine Company in 1929 with Nathaniel Shilkret conducting the Victor Symphony Orchestra, drawn from members of the Philadelphia Orchestra. Gershwin was on hand to "supervise" the recording; however, Shilkret was reported to be in charge and eventually asked the composer to leave the recording studio. Then, a little later, Shilkret discovered there was no one to play the brief celesta solo during the slow section, so he hastily asked Gershwin if he might play the solo; Gershwin said he could and so he briefly participated in the actual recording. This recording is believed to use the taxi horns in the way that Gershwin had intended using the notes A-flat, B-flat, a higher D, and a lower A.

The radio broadcast of the September 8, 1937, Hollywood Bowl George Gershwin Memorial Concert, in which An American in Paris, also conducted by Shilkret, was second on the program, was recorded and was released in 1998 in a two-CD set.

Arthur Fiedler and the Boston Pops Orchestra recorded the work for RCA Victor, including one of the first stereo recordings of the music.

In 1945, Arturo Toscanini conducting the NBC Symphony Orchestra recorded the piece for RCA Victor, one of the few commercial recordings Toscanini made of music by an American composer.

The Seattle Symphony also recorded a version in 1990 of Gershwin's original score, before numerous edits were made resulting in the score as we hear it today.

The blues section of An American in Paris has been recorded separately by a number of artists; Ralph Flanagan & His Orchestra released it as a single in 1951 which reached No. 15 on the Billboard chart. Harry James released a version of the blues section on his 1953 album One Night Stand, recorded live at the Aragon Ballroom in Chicago (Columbia GL 522 and CL 522).

== Use in film ==
In 1951, Metro-Goldwyn-Mayer released the musical film An American in Paris, featuring Gene Kelly and Leslie Caron and directed by Vincente Minnelli. Winning the 1951 Best Picture Oscar and numerous other awards, the film featured many tunes of Gershwin and concluded with an extensive, elaborate dance sequence built around the symphonic poem An American in Paris (arranged for the film by Johnny Green), which at the time was the most expensive musical number ever filmed, costing $500,000 ($6.2 million in 2025).
