= The Memoirs of an Amnesiac =

1965 book by Oscar Levant

- Author: Oscar Levant
- Language: English
- Genre: Autobiography
- Publisher: G. P. Putnam's Sons
- Publication date: 1965

The Memoirs of an Amnesiac is the autobiography of actor, composer, radio, and television personality Oscar Levant. Published in 1965 by G. P. Putnam's Sons, it became a best-seller, following a quarter-century after his first book, A Smattering of Ignorance.

Levant intersperses his reminisces about Hollywood in its heyday with one-liners and pithy quotes by himself and others.

== See also ==
- Erik Satie, Mémoires d'un amnésique (Memoirs of an Amnesiac)
