= Ben Bernie and All the Lads =

1925 film

- Produced by: Lee de Forest
- Starring: Ben Bernie; Oscar Levant
- Distributed by: De Forest Phonofilm
- Release date: 1925
- Running time: 10 minutes
- Country: United States
- Language: English

Ben Bernie and All the Lads is a short film made by Lee de Forest in the De Forest Phonofilm sound-on-film process. The film features Ben Bernie conducting his band All The Lads, and features pianist Oscar Levant and saxophonist Jack Pettis. At the time of the filming, Ben Bernie and All the Lads were a featured band at the Hotel Roosevelt in New York City.

The band and Levant perform songs—or medleys of songs—including:

- "Tea for Two"
- "Rose Marie"
- "Lady Be Good"
- "Tell Her in the Springtime"
- "Craving"
- "Tintina"
- "Sweet Georgia Brown"
- "Indian Love Call"

by composers such as Bernie, George Gershwin, Vincent Youmans, Irving Berlin, and Oscar Hammerstein.

The film was produced by de Forest at his studio in New York City in 1925. Earlier dates have been claimed, with no hard evidence to support them, but one of the featured songs, "Sweet Georgia Brown", was not copyrighted, published or recorded until 1925.
