= Talala =

Talala may refer to:

- Talala, Oklahoma, a town in the United States
- Talala, Gujarat, a town in India
- Talala (Vidhan Sabha constituency), a legislative assembly constituency in India

== See also ==
- Tra la la (disambiguation)
