= Ben Bernie =

American jazz violinist and radio personality (1891–1943)

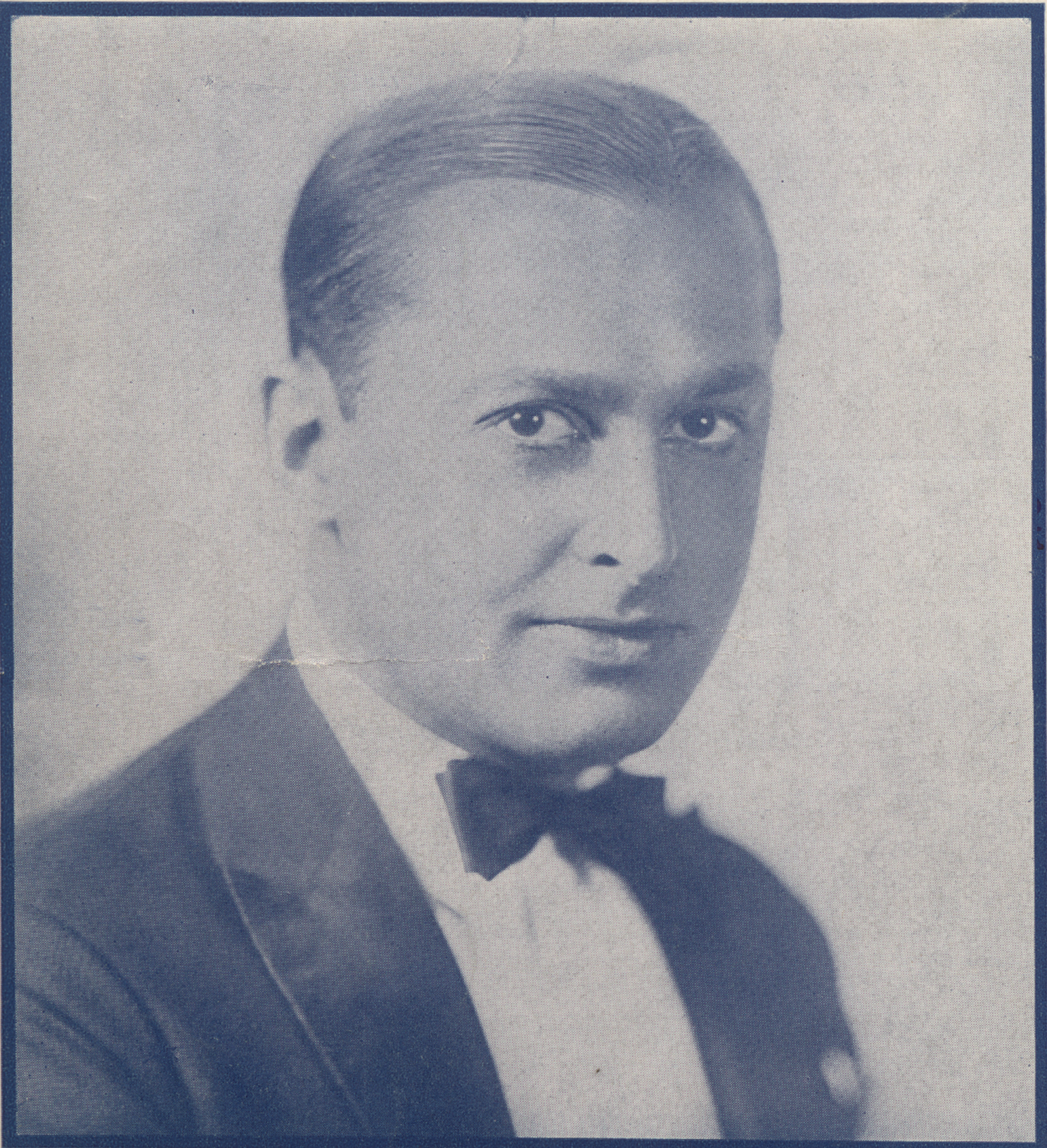
- Ben Bernie as seen on early 1930s sheet music

Background information
- Born: Benjamin Anzelevitz; May 30, 1891; Bayonne, New Jersey, U.S.
- Died: October 23, 1943 (aged 52) Hollywood, California, U.S.
- Genres: Jazz, big band, traditional pop
- Occupations: Musician; composer; bandleader; radio personality
- Instrument: Violin

Benjamin Anzelevitz (May 30, 1891 – October 20, 1943), known professionally as Ben Bernie, was an American jazz violinist, bandleader, and radio personality, often introduced as "The Old Maestro". He was noted for his showmanship and memorable bits of snappy dialogue, being part of the first generation of American popular music stars, alongside other artists such as Paul Whiteman (a fellow violinist and bandleader), Ted Lewis, and Al Jolson.

== Career ==
=== Early years ===
Bernie was born Benjamin Anzelevitz in Bayonne, New Jersey. His parents were Julius and Anna Anzelevitz, immigrants of Jewish descent. He was one of eleven children. He attended Columbia University and the New York College of Music. By the age of 15 he was teaching violin, but this experience apparently diminished his interest in the violin for a time.

Bernie performed in vaudeville, appearing with Charles Klass as The Fiddle Up Boys in 1912 and with Phil Baker as Baker and Bernie, but he met with little success until 1922 when he joined his first orchestra. Later, he had his own band, The Lads, seen in the early DeForest Phonofilm sound short, Ben Bernie and All the Lads (1924–25), featuring pianist Oscar Levant. He toured with Maurice Chevalier in Europe.

=== Radio and other performances ===
Ben Bernie pictured in an ad for his NBC radio series of 1932–35

Bernie and his orchestra were heard November 15, 1926, via a remote broadcast from the Hotel Roosevelt in New York City, on the first NBC broadcast. In 1928, he starred in the Broadway musical, Here's Howe, as Dan Danny.

Bernie and his Orchestra in a Vitaphone Varieties short (1930).

His musical variety radio shows through the 1930s, usually titled Ben Bernie, The Old Maestro, received ratings that placed him among radio's top ten programs. He was heard on radio as early as 1923, broadcasting on WJZ and the NBC Blue Network in 1930–31, sponsored by Mennen. After a 1931–32 run on CBS, sponsored by Blue Ribbon Malt, which was acquired by Pabst Beer (during Prohibition, they sold malt syrup, the primary ingredient in brewing "homemade beer"), he was heard Tuesdays on NBC from 1932 to 1935, also with Pabst. His announcer during this period was Jimmy Wallington.

On the Blue Network from 1935 to 1937, Bernie's sponsor was the American Can Company. He returned to CBS in 1938, sponsored by U.S. Rubber. With Half-&-Half Tobacco as a sponsor, he hosted a musical quiz program from 1938 to 1940. From 1940 to 1941, Bromo-Seltzer was his sponsor on the Blue Network. Wrigley's Gum sponsored The Ben Bernie War Workers' Program (1941–43). He also made guest appearances on other radio shows. He appeared in four feature films Shoot the Works (1934), Stolen Harmony (1935),Wake Up and Live (1937), and Love and Hisses (1937)

His theme was "It's a Lonesome Old Town" and his signature trademark, "yowsah, yowsah, yowsah" (also spelled "yowsa" or "yowza"), became a national catchphrase. The term was memorably used by a character in the film They Shoot Horses, Don't They? (1969), Richie Cunningham in a 1976 episode of Happy Days, "They Shoot Fonzies, Don't They?" (1976), by the band Chic with their hit "Dance, Dance, Dance (Yowsah, Yowsah, Yowsah)" (1977), Frank Zappa in his 1979 single "Dancin' Fool" and Ritch Brinkley as Cappy in 1994's comedy, Cabin Boy.

Announcers for Bernie's programs included Harlow Wilcox, Harry von Zell and Bob Brown. His radio shows featured comedy from Lew Lehr and Fuzzy Knight, and the line-up of vocalists included Buddy Clark, Little Jackie Heller, Scrappy Lambert, Pat Kennedy, Jane Pickens, Dinah Shore, and Mary Small.

To boost ratings, Walter Winchell and Bernie, who were good friends, staged a fake rivalry similar to the comedic conflict between Jack Benny and Fred Allen. This mutually beneficial "feud" was a running gag on their radio appearances and continued in two films in which they portrayed themselves: Wake Up and Live (1937) and Love and Hisses (1937). They are also caricatured in the Warner Bros. cartoons The Woods Are Full of Cuckoos (1937) as "Ben Birdie" and "Walter Finchell" and The Coo-Coo Nut Grove (1936) as "Ben Birdie" and "Walter Windpipe".

=== Recordings ===
Bernie's orchestra recorded throughout the 1920s and 1930s on Vocalion (1922–25), Brunswick (1925–33), Columbia (1933), Decca (1936), and ARC (Vocalion and OKeh) (1939–40). In 1923 Bernie and the Hotel Roosevelt Orchestra recorded "Who's Sorry Now?".

In 1925 Ben Bernie and his orchestra recorded "Sweet Georgia Brown". Bernie was the co-composer of this jazz standard, which became the theme song of the Harlem Globetrotters.

== Personal life ==
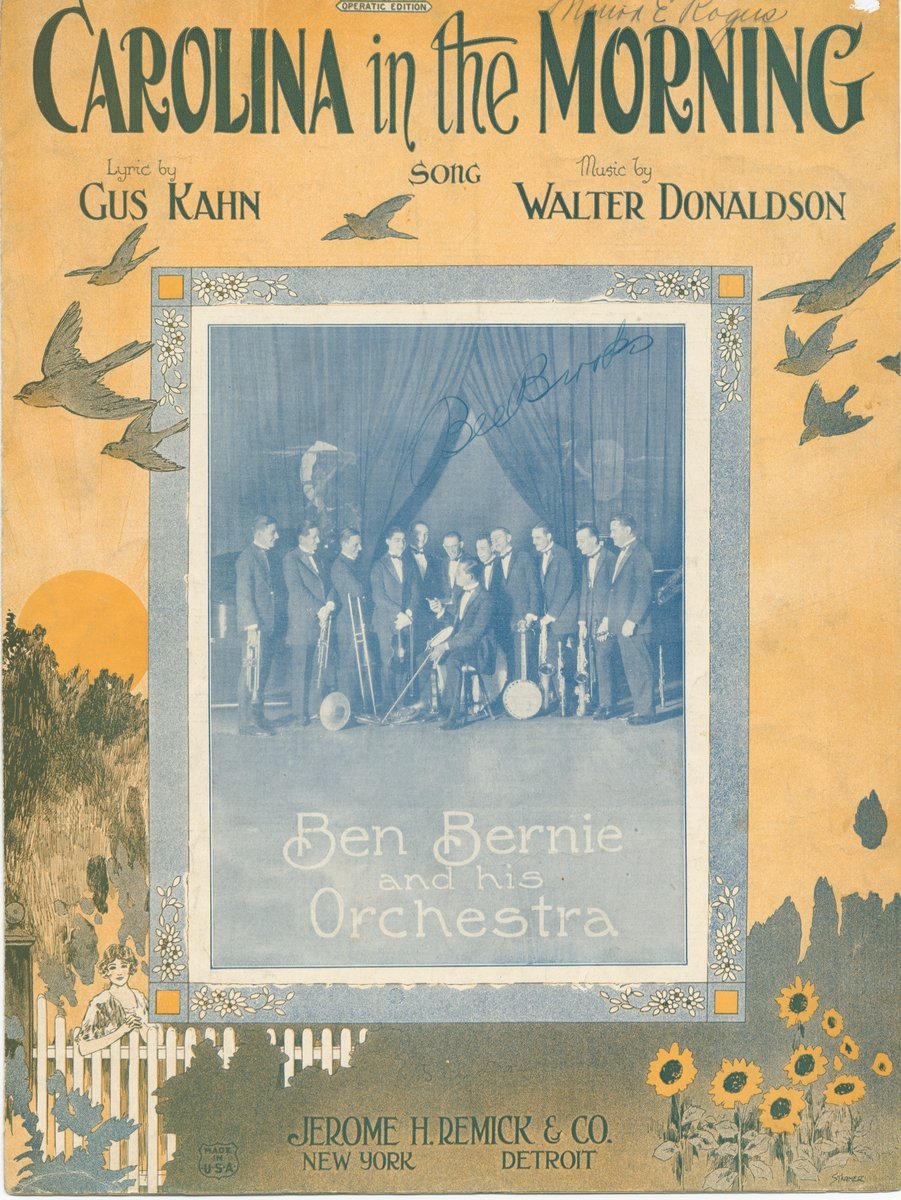
Ben Bernie and his orchestra on the cover of the sheet music for the 1922 hit song Carolina in the Morning

On December 24, 1915, Bernie married Rose Harris (maiden; 1893–1965) in Manhattan, New York. They had a son, Jason H. Bernie (1918–1969). Ben and Rose Bernie separated in September 1931 and divorced September 1935. In October 1935, Ben Bernie remarried Dorothy P. Wesley (1908–1990) in Miami, Florida.

Bernie died from a pulmonary embolism in October 1943, aged 52, and was buried in Mount Hebron Cemetery, in Queens, New York.

Bernie has a star at 6280 Hollywood Boulevard in the Radio section of the Hollywood Walk of Fame. It was dedicated February 8, 1960.

== Selected discography ==
- "Swinging Down the Lane" (1923) (Vocalion)
- "Wildflower" (1923) (Vocalion)
- "Sweet Georgia Brown" July 1925 (#1 hit for 5 weeks) (Vocalion)
- "Sleepy Time Gal" (vocal Arthur Fields) March 1926 (#1 hit for 4 weeks) (Brunswick)
- "Reaching for the Moon" (vocal Paul Hagan) (Benny Davis / Jesse Greer) (1926) (Brunswick)
- "Ain't She Sweet" (vocal Scrappy Lambert & Billy Hillpot) May 1927 (#1 hit for 4 weeks) (Brunswick)
- "I'm Looking Over a Four Leaf Clover" (vocal Scrappy Lambert) (1927) (Brunswick)
- "To Whom It May Concern" (1931) (Brunswick)
- "Just a Gigolo" (vocal Frank Sylvano) (1931) (Brunswick)
- "Marching Along Together" (vocal by Manny Prager & Ben Bernie) August 21, 1933 (Columbia)
- "We Won't Have to Sell the Farm" August 21, 1933 (Columbia)
- "The Duke Is on a Bat Again" (vocal by Manny Prager & Ben Bernie) August 21, 1933 (Columbia)
- "Ain't That Marvelous (My Baby Loves Me)" (vocal Manny Prager) August 21, 1933 (Columbia)
- "This Is Romance" (vocal by Frank Prince)), Sept. 19, 1933 (Columbia)
- "You Gotta Be a Football Hero", (vocal by Manny Prager & Ben Bernie) Sept. 19, 1933 (Columbia)
- "Shanghai Lil", (vocal by Stu Johnson) Sept. 26, 1933 (Columbia)
- "Who's Afraid of the Big Bad Wolf?", Sept. 26, 1933 (Columbia)

== Bibliography ==
- Dunning, John. On the Air: The Encyclopedia of Old-Time Radio, Oxford University Press, 1998. ISBN 0-19-507678-8
