= The Unimportance of Being Oscar =

1968 memoir by Oscar Levant

- Author: Oscar Levant
- Publisher: Putnam
- Publication date: 1968
- ISBN: 9780671771041

The Unimportance of Being Oscar is a 1968 memoir by writer/pianist/radio personality/actor Oscar Levant. The book is known for Oscar's laconic witticisms, such as "everyone in Hollywood is gay, except Gabby Hayes — and that's because he is a transvestite."

Levant writes about his family, his mental health problems, his musical career, politics, and more in typically amusing style. The book is full of observations of and encounters with the famous, including George and Ira Gershwin, Benny Goodman, George Bernard Shaw, Virgil Thomson, Herbert Beerbohm Tree, W. S. Gilbert, T. S. Eliot, Moss Hart, Alexander Woollcott, Noël Coward, Somerset Maugham, Dorothy Parker, Gertrude Stein, Franklin D. Roosevelt, Adlai Stevenson, John F. Kennedy, Gore Vidal, Christopher Isherwood, Paul Bowles, Judy Garland, Barbra Streisand and many others.

== Details ==
- The title of this autobiography is wordplay on the title of the Oscar Wilde play The Importance of Being Earnest.
