= For Goodness Sake (musical) =

Musical by Frederick J. Jackson

For Goodness Sake is a musical in two acts with a book by Fred Jackson, lyric by Arthur Jackson, and music by William Daly and Paul Lannin. Two songs were also provided by George Gershwin (music) and his brother Ira Gershwin (lyrics, under the pseudonym Arthur Francis); including "Tra-la-la". The show opened on Broadway at the Lyric Theatre on February 21, 1922. Produced by Alex A. Aarons, it ran for 103 performances; closing on May 20, 1922. The cast was led by Fred Astaire as Teddy Lawrence and Adele Astaire as Suzanne Hayden. The film Stop Flirting was based on a play of the same name that was in turn based on the musical For Goodness Sake.
