= The American Way (play) =

1939 play by George S. Kaufman and Moss Hart

- Original language: English
- Written by: George S. Kaufman and Moss Hart
- Subject: United States history
- Genre: Spectacle
- Setting: Ellis Island, 1896; Small American Town

Premiere
- Date: January 21, 1939
- Place: Center Theatre (New York City)

The American Way is a play by American playwrights George S. Kaufman and Moss Hart.

== Production ==
The original Broadway production of The American Way opened at the Center Theatre on January 21, 1939, in a production produced by Sam H. Harris and Max Gordon. It was directed by Kaufman and designed by Donald Oenslager (sets), Irene Sharaff (costumes), and Hassard Short (lights).

Husband and wife actors Fredric March and Florence Eldridge starred as Martin and Irma Gunther. Dick Van Patten had a role as Martin's grandson, Karl, at age 9; David Wayne played an adult version of the same character. This production made Scott McKay's debut in appearing in Broadway plays.

The American Way closed in June 1939, after 164 performances, and reopened July 17, playing for an additional 80 performances before closing permanently on September 23, 1939.

== Critical response ==
In his review for The New York Times, Brooks Atkinson called The American Way "a wide, handsome, densely populated cavalcade of American lore and democratic philosophy." He admitted that "it has some leaden moments, particularly in the second act, when the material is a little flimsy and the story-telling less firmly directed," but concluded that the play "shines like a good deed in a naughty world and also like a handsomely bedizened show."

The unsigned Variety review described the play as "a patriotic display that's stirring if taken in the mood of its writing," and said that it "belongs and will likely be an extra attraction for the World's Fair crowds."
