= Oscar Levant =

American musician and comedian (1906–1972)

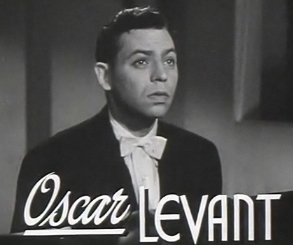
- Levant in the trailer for Rhapsody in Blue (1945)
- Born: December 27, 1906; Pittsburgh, Pennsylvania, U.S.
- Died: August 14, 1972 (aged 65); Beverly Hills, California, U.S.
- Occupations: Concert pianist; composer; conductor; author; actor; comedian; TV talk show host; radio personality
- Years active: 1923–1965
- Spouses: Barbara Woodell (m. 1932; div. 1933) June Gale (m. 1939)
- Children: 3

Oscar Levant (December 27, 1906 – August 14, 1972) was an American concert pianist, composer, conductor and actor born in Pittsburgh, U.S., from Russian-emigrant parents. Levant studied under Zygmunt Stojowski and Arnold Schoenberg, and has 33 albums as a pianist, having recorded works of numerous classical composers. For a period of time during the 1940s, he was the highest paid concert pianist in the United States.

Levant composed for over 75 Hollywood movies and Broadway plays. He acted in supporting roles in musicals starring Fred Astaire and Gene Kelly, and also in several movies, including The Barkleys of Broadway (1949), An American in Paris (1951), The Band Wagon (1953) and his friend George Gershwin's biopic Rhapsody in Blue (1945; where he played himself). He was awarded a star on the Hollywood Walk of Fame in 1960 for recordings featuring his piano performances.

Levant's musical and comedic geniuses were well known to American audiences through his frequent appearances on radio and TV. From 1958 – 1960 he hosted his own talk show, the Oscar Levant Show.

He was portrayed by Sean Hayes in the Broadway play Good Night, Oscar, written by Doug Wright.

Levant is also notable for having talked openly (and with a wit characteristic of him) about his mental health issues. He was addicted to prescription drugs and had been committed to psychiatric hospitals.

== Early life ==
Levant was born in Pittsburgh, Pennsylvania, United States, in 1906, to Orthodox Jewish Max, a watchmaker, and Annie, who emigrated from Russia. Levant's parents were married by his maternal grandfather, who was a rabbi.

Levant moved to New York in 1922. He began studying under Zygmunt Stojowski. In 1925, Levant appeared with Ben Bernie in a short sound film, Ben Bernie and All the Lads, made in New York City with the De Forest Phonofilm sound-on-film system. In the 1920s, Levant recorded with the Ben Bernie Orchestra.

== Career ==
Levant traveled to Hollywood in 1928, where his career took a turn for the better. During his stay, he met and became friends with George Gershwin. From 1929 to 1948, Levant composed the music for more than twenty movies. During this period, he also wrote or co-wrote numerous popular songs that made the hit parade, the most noteworthy being "Blame It on My Youth" (1934), now considered a standard.

Levant in An American in Paris (1951)

Levant began composing seriously around 1932. He studied under Arnold Schoenberg and impressed Schoenberg sufficiently to be offered an assistantship (which he turned down, considering himself unqualified). These formal studies led to a request by Aaron Copland to play at the Yaddo Festival of contemporary American music on April 30 of that year. Successful, Levant began composing a new orchestral work, a sinfonietta.

Levant made his debut as a music conductor in 1938 on Broadway, filling in for his brother Harry in sixty-five performances of George S. Kaufman and Moss Hart's The Fabulous Invalid. In 1939, he was again working on Broadway as composer and conductor of The American Way, another Kaufman and Hart production. He was a talented pianist and was well known for his recorded works of Gershwin, and numerous classical composers. During a time in the 1940s, he was the highest paid concert pianist in the United States.

Also, at this time, Levant was becoming known to American audiences as one of the regular panelists on the radio quiz show Information Please. Originally scheduled as a guest panelist, Levant proved so quick-witted and popular that he became a regular fixture on the show in the late-1930s and 1940s, along with fellow panelists Franklin P. Adams and John Kieran and moderator Clifton Fadiman. "Mr. Levant", as he was always called, was often challenged with musical questions, and he impressed audiences with his depth of knowledge and facility with a joke. Kieran praised Levant as having a "positive genius for making offhand cutting remarks that couldn't have been sharper if he'd honed them a week in his mind. Oscar was always good for a bright response edged with acid." Examples include "I knew Doris Day before she was a virgin", "I think a lot of [conductor/composer Leonard] Bernstein—but not as much as he does", and (after Marilyn converted to Judaism when she married playwright Arthur Miller), "Now that Marilyn Monroe is kosher, Arthur Miller can eat her."

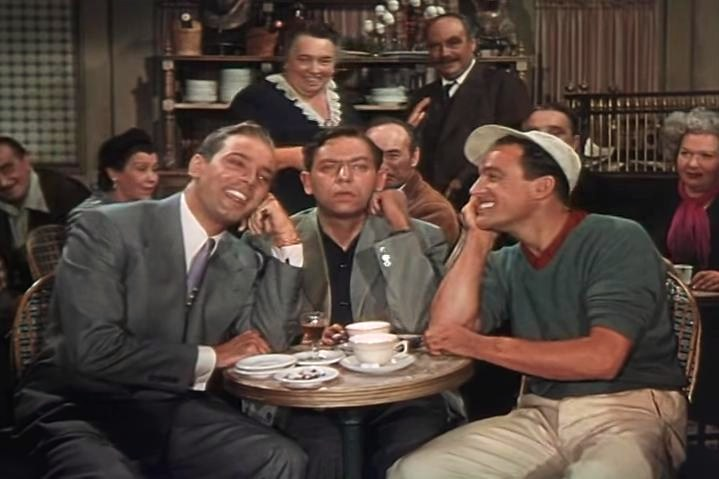
Georges Guétary, Levant, and Gene Kelly in An American in Paris (1951)

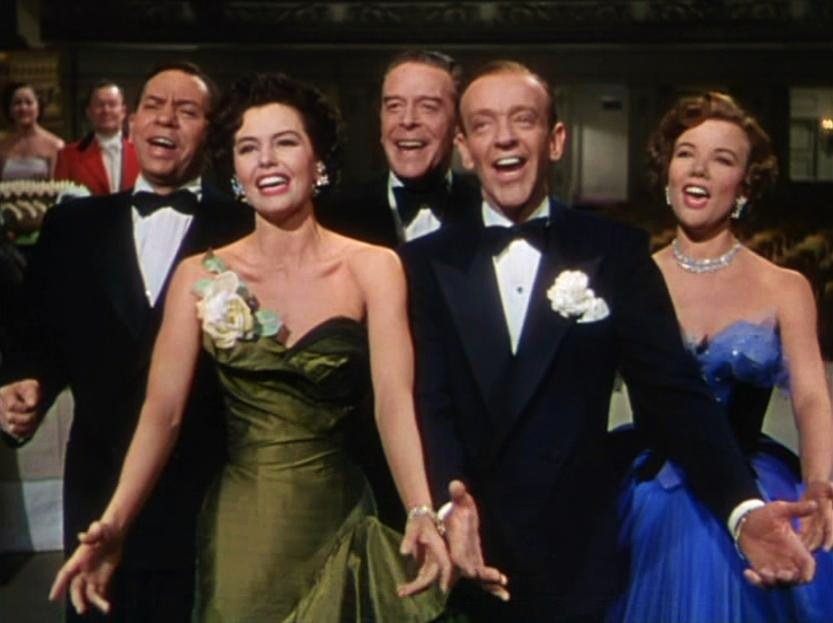
The cast of The Band Wagon (1953) L–R: Oscar Levant, Cyd Charisse, Jack Buchanan, Fred Astaire, and Nanette Fabray

Levant appeared in feature films, starting from the 1920s until the mid-50s, often playing a pianist or composer. He had supporting roles in the Metro-Goldwyn-Mayer musicals The Barkleys of Broadway (1949), starring Fred Astaire and Ginger Rogers; An American in Paris (1951), starring Gene Kelly; and The Band Wagon (1953), starring Astaire and Cyd Charisse. Oscar Levant regularly appeared on NBC radio's Kraft Music Hall, starring singer Al Jolson. He not only accompanied Jolson on the piano with classical and popular songs, but often joked and ad-libbed with Jolson and his guests. This included comedy sketches. Their individual ties to George Gershwin—Jolson introduced Gershwin's "Swanee"—undoubtedly had much to do with their rapport. Both Levant and Jolson appeared as themselves in the Gershwin biopic Rhapsody in Blue (1945).

In the early 1950s, Levant was an occasional panelist on the NBC radio and television game show Who Said That?. Levant hosted a talk show on KCOP-TV in Los Angeles from 1958 until 1960, The Oscar Levant Show, which was later syndicated. It featured his piano playing along with monologues and interviews with guests such as Fred Astaire and Linus Pauling. Full recordings of only two shows are known to have survived, one with Astaire, who paid to have a kinescope recording of the broadcast made so that he could assess his performance.

== Personal life ==
Levant married actress Barbara Woodell in 1932. The couple divorced in 1933. In 1939, Levant married singer and actress June Gale; they had three daughters, Marcia, Lorna, and Amanda.

Levant talked publicly about his neuroses and hypochondria. Levant became addicted to prescription drugs and was committed to psychiatric hospitals by his wife.

== Death ==
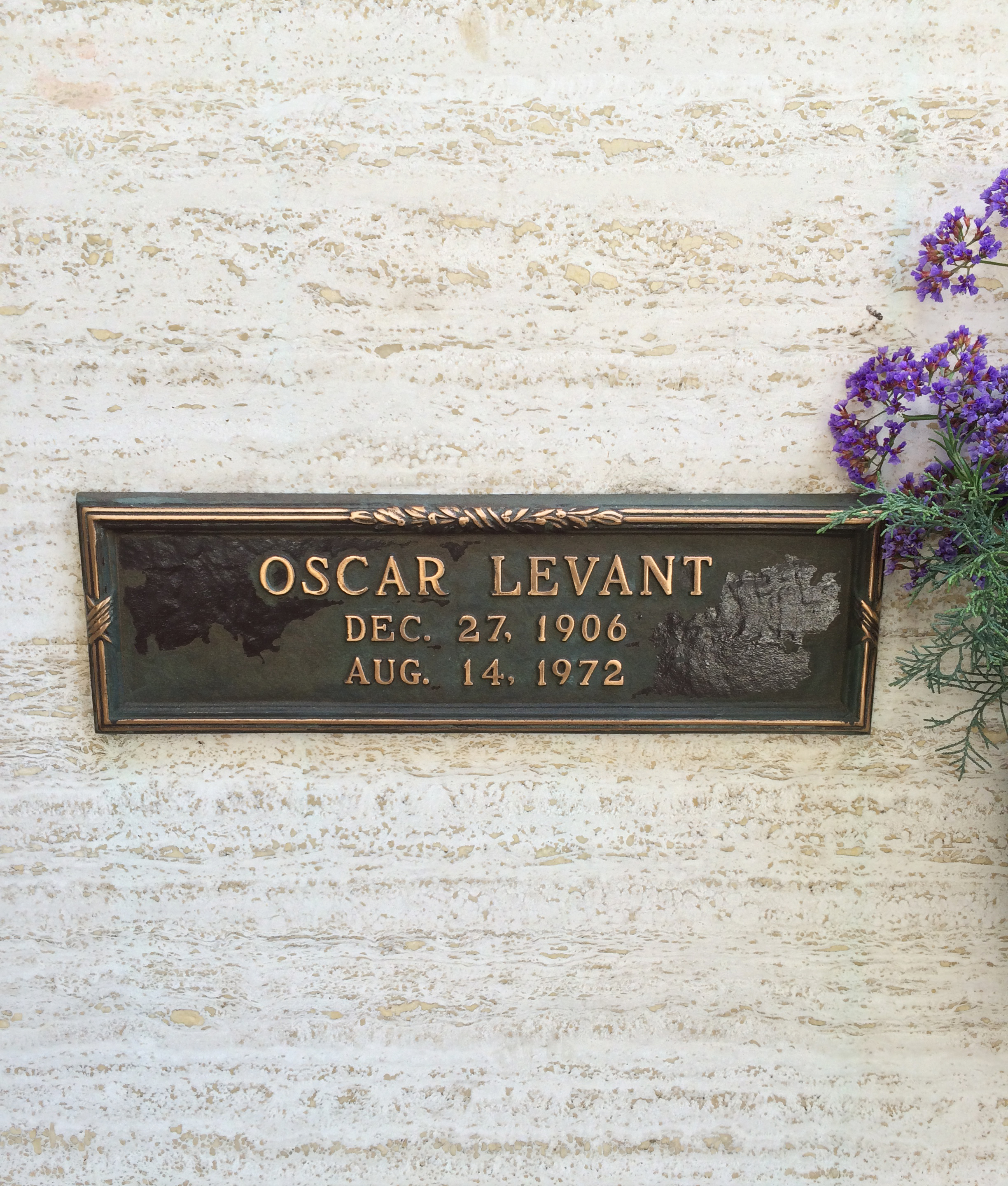
Crypt of Oscar Levant at Westwood Memorial Park

On August 14, 1972, Levant died of a heart attack at his home in Beverly Hills, California, at the age of 65. Levant's body was discovered by his wife, June, when she went to wake him from a nap for a scheduled interview with Candice Bergen, who was then working as a photojournalist. Bergen had shot photos of Levant on a previous visit, one of which was published in her memoir, Knock Wood.

Levant is interred in the Pierce Brothers Westwood Village Memorial Park Cemetery in Los Angeles.

== Legacy ==
Several plays have been written about Levant including At Wit's End: A Play with Music by Joel Kimmel (performed by Stan Freeman in a one-man show) and For Piano and Harpo by Dan Castellaneta, chronicling Levant's friendship with Harpo Marx.

Actor John Garfield used Levant as a model when creating the character of troubled genius Mickey Borden in the 1938 film Four Daughters. Levant was the inspiration for the neurotic, womanizing pianist Henry Orient in Nora Johnson's novel The World of Henry Orient (1964).

In April 2023, a play about Levant's life written by Pulitzer Prize winner Doug Wright premiered on Broadway. The play, Good Night, Oscar, premiered at the Belasco Theatre and starred Sean Hayes, who received a Tony Award for Best Actor in a Play for his performance. Good Night, Oscar was a fictionalized version of a true event in Levant's life, when he was given a four-hour leave of absence from a psychiatric hospital to allow him to appear on a TV game show (in the play it's portrayed as The Tonight Show.)

== Discography ==
Levant had an extensive musical career with over 75 composer credits and 33 albums that he recorded as a pianist.

== Acting credits ==
=== Filmography ===
- Ben Bernie and All the Lads (1925) as himself (a De Forest phonofilm)
- The Dance of Life (1929) as Jerry Evans
- Night Parade (1929) as Ann Pennington's piano accompanist (uncredited)
- In Person (1935)
- Charlie Chan at the Opera (1936) (composed music for film's opera)
- Rhythm on the River (1940) as Billy Starbuck
- Kiss the Boys Goodbye (1941) as Dick Rayburn aka Oscar
- Rhapsody in Blue (1945) as himself
- Humoresque (1946) as Sid Jeffers
- You Were Meant for Me (1948) as Oscar Hoffman
- Romance on the High Seas (1948) as Oscar Farrar (first Doris Day film)
- The Barkleys of Broadway (1949) as Ezra Millar
- An American in Paris (1951) as Adam Cook, bohemian pianist
- O. Henry's Full House (1952) as Bill Peoria (The Ransom of Red Chief)
- The I Don't Care Girl (1953) as Charles Bennett
- The Band Wagon (1953) as Lester Marton, based on Adolph Green
- The Cobweb (1955) as Mr. Capp

=== Television ===
- The Oscar Levant Show (1958–1960, TV series)
- The Jack Benny Program (1958, TV Series) as himself
- The Tonight Show hosted by Jack Paar (early 1960's)
- The Joey Bishop Show (1964, TV series) as himself
- The Merv Griffin Show (1965, TV series) as himself

=== Theatre ===
- Burlesque (1927) – musical play – performer
- Ripples (1930) – musical – co-composer
- Sweet and Low (1930) – musical revue – songwriter
- The Fabulous Invalid (1938) – musical play – replacement conductor
- The American Way (1939) – musical play – conductor and composer

== Quotations ==
Examples of his repartée:

- "I knew Doris Day before she was a virgin."
- "It's not what you are; it's what you don't become that hurts."
- Speaking about his deteriorating mental health on TV he said, "There is a fine line between genius and insanity, I have erased that line."

== Bibliography ==
- A Smattering of Ignorance, New York: Doubleday, 1940
- The Memoirs of an Amnesiac, New York: Putnam's, 1965
- The Unimportance of Being Oscar, New York: Putnam's, 1968
- A Talent for Genius: The Life and Times of Oscar Levant, 1994 biography by Sam Kashner and Nancy Schoenberger
