= William Merrigan Daly =

American songwriter

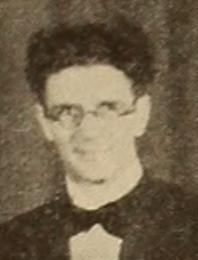
Daily c. 1931

William Merrigan Daly Jr. (1 September 1887 – 3 December 1936) (Note: Several sources including IBDb and VIAF cite 1974 as Daly's date of death.) was an American pianist, composer, songwriter, orchestrator, musical director and conductor.

== Life and career ==
William Daly was born in Cincinnati, Ohio, the son of a successful song-and-dance man. He attended Harvard University receiving a Bachelor of Arts degree in 1908. By 1911 he was a writer, editor, and eventually general manager for Everybody's Magazine in New York. Daly left the company in 1914 to pursue a show business career. He married in 1915 settling in New York City.

Daly played piano with various Broadway orchestras, and in time established himself as a songwriter, arranger, orchestrator, and music director, conducting more than twenty shows between 1915 and 1934. He met George and Ira Gershwin in the late 1910s. Daly and George Gershwin collaborated on several Broadway scores. Both contributed songs to Piccadilly to Broadway (1920), a show which closed in Atlantic City, and For Goodness' Sake (1922). The two jointly composed the score for Our Nell in 1923. This was the beginning of a long friendship; Daly was a frequent arranger, orchestrator and conductor of Gershwin's music, and Gershwin periodically turned to him for musical advice. Gershwin dedicated his 1926 Preludes for Piano to Daly.

Around 1930, Daly also became conductor and music director of the National Broadcasting Company radio orchestra.

Daly died suddenly of a heart attack in December 1936.

== Works ==
Operetta

- Western Stuff, Operetta in 1 reel (1917); libretto by James Montgomery Flagg

Broadway musical contributions (songs and numbers)

- Betty (1916)

Spilling the Beans, Fox-trot

- Everything (1918)

"You're the Very Girl I've Looked For"
"Sunshine Alley"
"Come to the Land of Romance"
"Roll Along"

- Kissing Time (1920); earlier version staged in London

"The Nicest Sort of Feeling"

- For Goodness' Sake (1922); co-composed with Paul Lannin; additional songs by George Gershwin

"All to Myself"
"When You're in Rome"
"Every Day"
"Twilight"
"Greatest Team of All"
"Oh Gee! Oh Gosh! I Love You"
"In the Days of Wild Romance"
"When Somebody Cares"
"The French Pastry Walk"
"The Whichness of the Whatness"

- Earl Carroll's Vanities of 1923 (1923)

"A Girl Is Like Sunshine"
"Laugh While You're Dancing Around"

- Our Nell (1923); co-composed with George Gershwin

"Gol-Durn!"
"Innocent Ingenue Baby"
"Old New England Home"
"The Cooney County Fair"
"Names I Love to Hear"
"By-and-By"
"Madrigal"
"We Go to Church on Sunday"
"Walking Home with Angeline"
"Oh, You Lady!"
"Little Villages"

- Jack and Jill (1923)

"Hello! Good-Bye"
"Pretty City Girl (I Want a Pretty Girl)"

Filmography

- Air Mail as 'Tex' Lane (1932); directed by John Ford
- "Could I Be in Love?", Song from the 1937 film Champagne Waltz directed by A. Edward Sutherland

Literary

- George Gershwin as Orchestrator (1933); published in the 15 January 1933 issue of The New York Times
