= Dave Kusek =

Businessperson

- Born: Southington, CT
- Education: University of Connecticut
- Occupations: Business executive, entrepreneur, music educator, author, software developer, online music business courses
- Years active: 1975-present
- Organization: New Artist Model
- Known for: Founding Passport Designs, MIDI software development, founding Berkleemusic.com
- Website: NewArtistModel.com

Dave Kusek is an American business executive, music educator, author, and software developer known for his work in the music industry. After working as chief engineer at Star Instruments in the 1970s, in 1980 he became the founding CEO of the music software company Passport Designs. With Passport he helped develop Master Tracks and Encore, and also co-developed software and hardware that utilized the then newly introduced MIDI interface.

From 1997 to 2012 he taught music business at Berklee College of Music, becoming a vice president and founding its online music school Berkleemusic.com. In 2005, Kusek co-wrote the music business book, The Future of Music: Manifesto for the Digital Music Revolution. In 2014 Kusek launched New Artist Model, an online music business school, which has been featured in publications such as Billboard, CMJ, and the Boston Globe. In 2026, Kusek received a Lifetime Achievement Award from the MIDI Association for his work in computer-based music creation.

== Early life and education ==
Dave Kusek was born in 1955 in Southington, Connecticut. From 1974 until 1980, Kusek studied music, communication, and computer science at the University of Connecticut.

== Business career ==
=== Star Instruments and Passport Designs (1970s-95s) ===
From 1975 until 1979 Kusek worked as chief engineer at Star Instruments, which made electronic drums such as the Synare. He became the founding CEO of Passport Designs in 1980, also taking on the role of president. The company developed music software allowing musicians to record and produce music using home studios. Among other programs, the company developed Master Tracks, Encore, MusicTime, Alchemy and the Soundchaser. While with Passport, he co-developed software and hardware interfaces using new the then new Music Instrument Digital Interface (MIDI) industry standard. He worked with Passport Designs until 1995.

=== Digital Cowboys (1997-present) ===
In 1997, Kusek founded and became managing partner of Digital Cowboys, a digital media consultancy. Clients over time included companies such as AOL, IBM, Nokia, A&M Records, BMG, Polygram, Nettwerk, Roland, Yamaha, Boston Acoustics, Liquid Audio, Kaman Music and Berklee College of Music.

=== Berklee Online (1997-12) ===
Kusek started teaching music business at Berklee College of Music in 1997, where he continued to teach for 14 years and became a vice president of the college. As founder and CEO of Berkleemusic, now called Berklee Online, Kusek created educational curricula as part of the first online music school. Berkleemusic won the award for the Best Online Course from the University Professional & Continuing Education Association for eight consecutive years. Kusek wrote a music business book, The Future of Music: Manifesto for the Digital Music Revolution with co-author Gerd Leonhard. Kusek left Berklee in 2012

=== New Artist Model (2014-present) ===
Kusek is the founder and CEO of New Artist Model, an online music business school for musicians, songwriters, producers, and managers. According to Billboard, Kusek started the course "to help build a next generation of independent artists." The first eight week Essential online course debuted in early 2014, and topics include "licensing, publishing, e-commerce, concerts, promotion and networking." In April 2014, Music X-Ray, Bandzoogle and CDBaby became affiliates of New Artist Model. The program has been used by artists such as Eden Kai, who won the Brown Bags to Stardom award in Hawaii in 2015. By 2018, enrollment in the school reached 3,700 members from 60 countries.

In 2026, Kusek received a Lifetime Achievement Award from the MIDI Association for his work in computer-based music creation.

== Publishing history ==
Year	Title	Authors	Publishing details
2005	The Future of Music	Gerd Leonhard, Dave Kusek	Berklee Press (Jan 1, 2005) / ISBN 978-0876390597
2015	Hack the Music Business	Dave Kusek	New Artist Model (Jan 1, 2015) /

== See also ==
- 2000s in the music industry
