= Passport Designs =

American music software company

Passport Designs Inc.
- Type: Private
- Industry: Music software
- Founded: 1979
- Founders: Dave Kusek, John Borowicz
- Products: Master Tracks Pro, Encore, etc.
- Website: PassportMusic.com

Passport Designs Inc. was a software company that created early music production software, such as the pre-MIDI SoundChaser in 1982. Other programs included Master Tracks Pro and Encore.

== History ==
=== Founding and early years ===
The company was founded in 1979 by Dave Kusek and John Borowicz, and incorporated in 1980, with Kusek as CEO and Borowicz as Vice-President of Development. They had previously worked together at Electronic Music Labs from 1973–76 and Star Instruments from 1976-79. The company was originally headquartered in Montara, California, moving to Half Moon Bay, California and finally to Foster City, California. Engineering offices were also briefly maintained in Minnesota and Portland, Oregon.

=== Early computer music software ===
The company was a pioneer in the field of computer music, introducing the pre-MIDI SoundChaser in 1982. This Apple II-based system included the Mountain Computer Music System, a programmable 8-voice wavetable synthesizer that fit in two Apple II slots, the Soundchaser 4-octave keyboard, and system software, written by Kusek, that emulated a four-track tape recorder.

After Mountain Computer discontinued the Mountain Computer Music System, Passport developed the Soundchaser MX-5(MX-500) Card to use instead. The MX-5 contained a Mountain Computer Music System-compatible sound function as well as a MIDI interface and the keyboard interface of the Soundchaser Music keyboard in a single card.

In 1983, composer John Melcher developed 4-Track Editor, a composing application that enabled music to be entered like a word-processor. The same year, Passport released Turbo-Traks, a 16-track version of their recording software. At this time, they also released Notewriter, a "real-time monophonic music transcriber", and Notetools, an add-on to convert Notewriter files to 4-Track Performance files. They also released a series of educational applications, written by Dr. Charles Brody.

=== MIDI ===
When the first MIDI specification was adopted in 1983, Passport put all of its development resources in this direction, licensing and developing a MIDI interface from Rittor Music in Japan and hiring Melcher to develop MIDI recording software. Composer Phil Stone was also hired at this time, first to develop audio for games on the Commodore 64, and then to port MIDI applications from Apple II to Commodore.

The first of these were MIDI/2 and MIDI/4, two-track and four-track MIDI sequencer/recorders for Apple II and Commodore 64 platforms, including OEM versions of MIDI/4 for Yamaha and Korg. These were introduced at the 1984 National Association of Music Manufacturers (NAMM) trade show, the first commercially available MIDI sequencers in the United States. These were followed by Master Tracks in 1985, and Master Tracks Pro in 1986. This software pushed the Apple II to its limits, working with an optional card to extend the Apple's memory from 48K to 2M. In 1987, after Melcher left Passport, Master Tracks Pro was completely rewritten for the Apple Macintosh, and later the Atari ST series computers, and still exists for Windows and Apple O/Ses.

Nine MIDI files by the company were included in Windows 3.0 with Multimedia Extensions. From Windows 95 to 2000, only PASSPORT.MID, and CANYON.MID ("Trip Through the Grand Canyon" composed by George Stone) remained, which are located in the MEDIA directory. Windows 3.1 only included the latter.

=== Other applications ===
PolyWriter, Passport's first music notation application, was released in 1984, followed by Encore, a professional music notation application capable of creating high-quality scores. The Encore feature set was adapted to different markets and sold as Rhapsody, MusicTime and MusicTime Deluxe. There was also a version called music@Passport, an attempt to integrate web-based music publishing into a desktop notation editor.

Passport Memphis was a guitar tablature creation application that offered an easy-to-use drag-and-drop interface that enabled the user to create and print easy-to-read tabs.

Alchemy was a waveform audio editor, originally developed by Blank Software and subsequently purchased by Passport, that integrated Macintosh computers with most current digital sampler brands that supported the MIDI Sample Dump Standard, including Akai, Casio, E-mu, Ensoniq, Korg, Kurzweil, Peavey and Roland. Later versions allowed users to create a sound library that could be shared those sounds across multiple sampler formats. The final version, version 3.0, was released in 1996.

The professional standard SCORE music engraving program was written by Leland Smith with additions by Perry Devine of Passport Designs and released by the company in 1987.

Shifting focus from music software to the nascent "multimedia" market, they introduced Passport Producer in 1992, and Producer Pro 1.0 in 1994.

=== Sale of the company ===
The company sold its assets to G-VOX in 1998, when Passport Designs ceased to exist as a company. In August 2013, G-VOX sold the rights to most of its software (Encore, MusicTime Deluxe, MasterTracks Pro, Bring Music to Life) to Passport Music Software, LLC.

On 31 January 2022 Passport Music Software, LLC ceased trading and offered the company and its intellectual property for sale.

In mid-2022 the original developer of Encore, Don Williams, bought the company and announced a new version of Encore for an autumn release the same year.

== See also ==
- Master Tracks Pro
