= Artists and repertoire =

Division of a record label

Artists and repertoire (A&R) is the division of a record label or music publishing company that is responsible for scouting, financing, and overseeing the artistic development of recording artists and songwriters. It also acts as a liaison between artists and the record label or publishing company.

== Responsibilities ==
=== Finding talent ===
The A&R division of a record label is responsible for finding new recording artists and bringing those artists to the record company. A&R staff may go to hear emerging bands play at nightclubs and festivals to scout for talent. Personnel in the A&R division are expected to understand the current tastes of the market and to be able to find artists who will be commercially successful.

An A&R executive is authorized to offer a record contract, often in the form of a "deal memo" – a short, informal document that establishes a business relationship between the recording artist and the record company. The actual contract negotiations will typically be carried out by entertainment lawyers.

A&R executives rely mostly on the word of mouth of trusted associates, critics and business contacts, rather than on unsolicited demo tapes.

=== Overseeing the recording process ===
The A&R division of a record label oversees the music style and recording process. This includes helping the artist to find the right record producer, scheduling time in a recording studio and advising the artist on all aspects of making a high-quality recording. They work with the artist to choose the best songs (i.e., repertoire) to record. For artists who do not write their own music, the A&R person will assist in finding songs, songwriters and arrangers. A&R staff will help find session musicians for the recording. A&R executives maintain contact with their counterparts at music publishing companies to get new songs and material from songwriters and producers.

As the record nears completion, the A&R department works closely with the artist to determine whether the record is acceptable to the record company. This process may include suggesting that new songs need to be written, that existing songs need a new arrangement, or that some album tracks need to be re-recorded. A key issue is whether the album has a single – a particular track which can be used to market the record.

=== Assisting with marketing and promotion ===
Once the record is completed, the A&R department consults with marketing, promotion, the artist and their management to choose one or more singles to help promote the record.

== History and influence ==
The tastes of particular A&R executives have influenced the course of music history. A&R man John Hammond discovered Billie Holiday, Bob Dylan, Aretha Franklin and Bruce Springsteen. Hammond's colleagues were initially skeptical of these artists because none of them appeared to be creating "commercial" music. Hammond's instincts proved to be correct, and these artists went on to sell hundreds of millions of records. Gary Gersh signed the band Nirvana to David Geffen's DGC Records at a time when alternative rock music was not considered commercial. Gersh was able to convince his co-workers to push the record in spite of their misgivings. In cases like these, A&R people have radically changed the direction of popular musical tastes and introduced large numbers of people to new sounds.

This kind of prescience is the exception rather than the rule. Historically, A&R executives have tended to sign new artists who fit into recent trends and who resemble acts that are currently successful. For example, Columbia Records' A&R man in the 1950s, Mitch Miller, favored traditional pop singers like Guy Mitchell and Patti Page, and rejected early rock-'n'-rollers Elvis Presley and Buddy Holly.

This "trend following" mindset has generated several waves of narrowly defined genres, leading to a perception of triteness, including teen pop (1998–2001), alternative rock (1993–1996), glam metal (1986–1991) and disco (1976–1978). Trend following can be counter-productive, since it has often led to over-promotion followed by backlash (as happened to the disco genre for example). Towards the end of the life of each wave or trend, record companies have found themselves faced with enormous losses as consumers' tastes changed. For example, at the end of the disco boom in 1978, millions of records were returned by record retailers, causing a deep recession in the music business that lasted until 1982, when Michael Jackson's Thriller finally brought the public back into record stores in large numbers.

The general move towards more conservative and business-minded signings from the 1980s onwards is seen to be symptomatic of an industry where the most powerful figures are no longer music fans or people with musical backgrounds, but are business executives, a group largely composed of individuals with uniform backgrounds. Traditionally A&R executives were composers, arrangers and producers – Atlantic Records's heads Jerry Wexler and Ahmet Ertegun were producers and composers respectively – but an A&R with musical ability and knowledge has become a rarity, with Ron Fair and Martin Kierszenbaum being notable recent exceptions. The composer and arranger Richard Niles has said,

What you've got now is huge multinational companies where most of their A&R staff are businessmen. They're people who look at music from the standpoint of marketing, not from the standpoint of music and talent. They will say, "Go out and get me anything that's popular now."

Hip hop group Wu-Tang Clan referenced this stereotype of the business-minded A&R executive in their single "Protect Ya Neck", metaphorically likening them to "mountain climbers".

== Regional variations ==
According to Rhythm King Records and Lizard King Records founder Martin Heath, the A&R community in the UK is more integrated than it is in the US, being very London-centric and encompassing a relatively small number of people. "If scouts are chasing a band, you'll see the same thirty people in one room. You get a herd mentality in the UK, but also some very diverse signings as well," he said in an interview with HitQuarters. Heath believes that in the US it is more typical for A&R to wait until a band is established – having attracted other offers or achieved a level of sales – before taking action, a technique which often works out as being more expensive.

== 2000s changes ==
New forms of digital distribution have changed the relationship between consumers and the music they choose. Gerd Leonhard and others argue that the wide selection of music on digital services has allowed music consumers to bypass the traditional role of A&R. In the wake of declining record sales, many A&R staffers have been terminated.

== See also ==
- Impresario
- Song plugger
