= Master Tracks Pro =

Music-sequencer software for windows

MTPro

- Master Tracks Pro 6.8.3 running on Windows 7
- Developers: Passport Music Software, LLC
- Stable release: 6.8.4 / August 3, 2005
- Operating system: Microsoft Windows (Atari ST / Amiga until 3.6) (Apple IIGS until 1.04)
- Type: Music sequencer
- License: Proprietary
- Website: http://www.passportmusic.com/products/master-tracks-pro/

Master Tracks Pro (MTP) is music-sequencer software for Windows, to author and/or edit MIDI data. David Kusek and Don Williams et al. at Passport Designs originally created it, continuation of marketing and development by GVOX, and, as of Aug. 8, 2013, by Passport Music Software, LLC.

== History ==
MTP originated in the middle '80s for the Commodore and Apple II machines, and when the Atari ST implemented its MIDI support. It has continued to be one of the more popular proprietary sequencers, but hasn't seen any major updates since 2003 (after having been acquired by GVOX) other than 6.8.4 for Windows, which is reputed to have compatibility issues of its own. However, MTP's user-friendly interface and ease of use long made it one of the better packages for managing MIDI. See the Passport Designs Wiki for more details. GVOX sold the Passport software to Passport Music Software, LLC, in the second half of 2013.

=== Future ===
Passport Music Software, LLC, had announced plans to show MasterTracks Pro 7 at the 2015 NAMM Show, but as of January 2019, the latest version offered on its website was Version 6.8.4 for Windows.

== Capabilities ==
MTP's default data rate is 240 ppqn (time base, pulses per quarter note), or can use 480|960, for higher resolution. A child window is not limited within a parent, but can be placed anywhere on the screen. The user can save this layout by invoking Setup | Save preferences, which creates a new PREFER683.MTP with this information.

MTP's Anastasia font is used for rendering the Notation window's two-stave piano score, and also provides symbols for guitar-tablature display of chording.

Its fixed-size Conductor window at bottom center left in the screen shot allows flexing of tempo, offsetting in real time, by dragging the slider thumb.

The also fixed-size Transport strip-window to its right provides controls analogous to those of a tape deck, to start-stop, index, etc.; displays measure | beat | clock information for the sequence currently being played; and shows the file name on its title bar.

MTP's windows can display continuous data either as a linear curve or filled below, and one can thin MIDI data according to need. It can handle as many as 16 MIDI interfaces, and supports the MCI on Windows, has remote capabilities, a "big counter" mode for visibility at a distance during performance or recording, and also punch-in and -out capabilities.

MTP can insert and manage markers, information about which can be imported into its Notepad along with track information, as well as handle quite complex meter layouts, as long as beats per measure is less than 17.

== Appearance and functionality ==
A GUI application, it uses a hierarchy of windows as listed here:

- A master, non-closeable, but resizable/positionable stripe-window at the top in the screen shot at right, which supervises the application's overall user interface via a standard menu with drop-down functions:
  - File, for standard handling functions, which include saving to its own native .MTS file format (which appears to conflict with other multimedia formats), and also saves to generic .MID, or .RMI (RIFF), of either types 0 & 1. This menu also provides notation-print capabilities.
  - Edit, for context-sensitive MIDI-editing functions
  - Change, for changing parameters within track data, such as filtering, quantizing/humanizing, etc.
  - The Windows menu provides access to such for each main MIDI data type (all of which the user can position and size within reasonable limits, which values are stored in its configuration file, PREFER683.MTP, found in MTP's installation directory):
    - A Track Editor that can manage up to 64 tracks. Its hideable left half displays global data for each track such as flags, and the right displays track measures as horizontal rows of rectangles (dark-blue if a measure is non-empty, else white) by default numbered in multiples of four, which increment can be changed.
    - The Notation window displays a track's MIDI in a WYSIWYG notation format on a two-stave piano tablature using code derived from Passport's notation application Encore (which requires the font Anastasia, provided in TrueType and Type 1 formats). The inter-staff split point for notes can be reset, to adjust ledger-line behavior. The user can click on and edit notes in this mode, such as flatting or sharping on a note-by-note basis.
    - The Piano Roll window displays a track's MIDI note and program-change data in a window that resembles a player piano roll: It shows notes as multi-pixel-thick, dark-blue line segments. The user can edit data using many useful mechanisms, such as being able to turn on note-velocity display, which is then shown as a thin vertical line at the left of note segments, click-dragging entire notes, or their ends for length, etc.
    - The Event Editor presents all a track's data as a raw vertical alphanumeric, filterable list, which permits direct entry of data or editing it piecemeal, or by selected region.
    - A Master Fader allows the user to control overall volume from one place.
    - The Pitch Bend window displays such data graphically, and allows it to be entered and edited that way in an interactive manner, with the mouse.
    - The Channel Pressure window functions similarly for that data type.
    - The Key Pressure window functions similarly for that data type.
    - The Modulation window functions similarly for that data type.
    - The Controllers window functions similarly for data of that type for each MIDI specified controller — e.g., dynamic contours as controlled via #7 volume, L-R pan via #10.
    - The Velocity window separates and displays notes' velocity data in a graphical format without distracting note data, to permit easier visualization of velocity-related dynamics.
    - The Tempo Map window allows fine-scale WYSIWYG graphical editing of this MIDI-file data track, for controlling rubato, accel- and ritardando, etc. — as opposed to the coarse, basic control provided by the Conductor function on the Info drop-down menu (q.v., below).
  - Songs, for managing multiple open files, playing them as program sets, opening and saving such, re-ordering them, etc.
  - Layout, for controlling options for display of data.
  - Options, for controlling program operational functionality.
  - Setup, for controlling program parameters like
    - Sysex (system-Exclusive, for sending/receiving such data to/from an external device, and saving to a file)
    - Remote (which music-keyboard keys control what program features, remotely)
    - MIDI setup (driver channels, etc.)
    - Sync (internal or external)
    - Click (which notes/channels to use for this)
    - Thru (for behavior & channels for this)
    - Chase Controllers (which to chase, etc.)
    - Record filter (block data from being recorded, etc.)
    - Punch (in/out points)
    - Time Base (240 [default], 480, or 960, plus conversion options)
    - Save Preferences (.MTP file)
  - Info, for displaying system and sequence parameters, including an editable notepad for the sequence.
  - Help, which invokes a compiled help file.

== See also ==
- Comparison of MIDI editors and sequencers
