= John Chowning =

American musician (born 1934)

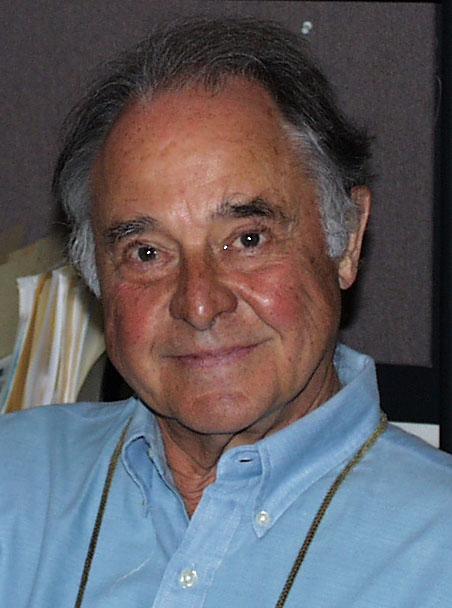
- Born: John M. Chowning; August 22, 1934 (age 92); Salem, New Jersey, U.S.
- Education: Stanford University
- Occupations: Composer; Musician; Inventor

John M. Chowning (/ˈtʃaʊnɪŋ/; born August 22, 1934) is an American composer and acoustician. He is best known for developing a digital implementation of frequency modulation synthesis.

== Technical innovations ==
Chowning is known for having developed the frequency modulation (FM) synthesis algorithm in 1967. In FM synthesis, one audio wave modulates the frequency of another, producing a resultant sound that can be periodic or non-periodic depending upon the ratio of their frequencies. He spent six years turning his breakthrough into a system of musical importance and eventually was able to simulate a large number of musical sounds. In 1974, Stanford University licensed the discovery to Yamaha, with whom Chowning worked in developing a family of synthesizers and organs. This was Stanford's most lucrative patent at one time.

The first commercial musical instrument to incorporate FM synthesis was the Synclavier I, introduced by New England Digital in 1977. Their Synclavier II, introduced in 1980, was frequently used in the production of popular music beginning that year. The first Yamaha product to incorporate the FM algorithm was the GS1, a digital synthesizer that first shipped in 1981. Yamaha introduced their first commercially successful FM synthesizer, the much less expensive DX7, in 1983. The DX7 was used on a host of popular songs throughout the 1980s, including Prince's "When Doves Cry", A-ha's "Take On Me", George Michael’s "Careless Whisper", and Sade’s "Smooth Operator". It has also been used extensively by composer Brian Eno.

Another important aspect of Chowning's work is sound spatialization. Chowning developed an influential spatialization algorithm during the decade between 1962 and 1972. This period coincides with his initial years at Stanford University, first as a graduate student and later as assistant professor, an exceptional historical period during which he built a series of important collaborations with Leland Smith, Max Mathews, Manfred R. Schroeder, Karlheinz Stockhausen, David Poole, Andy Moorer, who all influenced his work. In 1972, in his composition Turenas, he was first able to create the illusion of a continuous 360-degree space using quadraphonic sound.

== Early life ==
The first instrument Chowning learned was the violin, which he picked up after finding one in the attic of his family home; he then studied drums in high school. The Korean War had begun by the time he graduated, and instead of enlisting, Chowning auditioned for the Navy School of Music, which led to him performing in an 18-piece band on a Mediterranean aircraft carrier. After the war, Chowning graduated from Wittenberg University with a Bachelor of Music degree in 1959. He studied music composition with Nadia Boulanger in Paris from 1959 to 1961 before enrolling at Stanford, where he received his Doctor of Musical Arts degree in 1966, studying under Leland Smith. He was the founding director of the Center for Computer Research in Music and Acoustics (CCRMA) at Stanford, established in 1975.

Chowning also worked for a number of years at IRCAM in Paris, and he and CCRMA were influential reference points in the founding of the French centre, with Chowning having repeated meetings and exchanges with Pierre Boulez in the 1970s.

== Compositions ==
One of Chowning's most famous pieces is called Stria (1977). It was commissioned by IRCAM for the Institute's first major concert series called Perspectives of the 20th Century. His composition was noted for its inharmonic sounds due to his famous FM algorithm and his use of the golden mean in music. With Phoné (1980–1981), he became the first to put FM over speech synthesis.

=== List of works ===
- Sabelithe (1966, revised 1971)
- Turenas, (1972)
- Stria (1977)
- Phoné (1980–1981)
- Voices (2005)

== Awards & Honors ==
- Computer History Museum Fellow Award (2026)
- Technical Grammy Award (2026)
- Fellow, American Academy of Arts and Sciences (1988)
- Officer of the Ordre des Arts et des Lettres (1995): Awarded by the French Ministry of Culture.
- Honorary degrees from Leuphana University of Lüneburg (1990), University of the Mediterranean (2002), and Queen's University Belfast (2010).
- Giga-Hertz Award Laureate (2013): For computer music.
- Yamaha "Man of the Year" (1986)

== Fellowships & Commissions ==
- National Endowment for the Arts Fellowships.
- DAAD Artist-in-Residence in Berlin (1974).
- Invited Composer/Researcher at IRCAM (1978, 1985)
- Commissions from IRCAM and the Groupe de Recherches Musicales (GRM)

== Academic Recognition ==
- Osgood Hooker Professorship of Fine Arts, Stanford University (1992)
- Founding Director of CCRMA
