= Richard Swift (composer) =

American classical composer

Richard G. Swift (September 24, 1927 – November 8, 2003) was an American composer and music theorist.

== Life ==
Born in Middle Point, Ohio, Swift studied with Leland Smith, Grosvenor Cooper, and Leonard B. Meyer at the University of Chicago, where he received an MA in 1956. His career was spent teaching at the University of California, Davis, from 1956 until his retirement in 1991. He was the recipient of many awards, amongst others from the National Endowment for the Arts (1977), and the American Academy and Institute of Arts and Letters (1978). He died in Davis, California, in 2003.

In addition to his activity as a composer, he also published many articles on twentieth-century music and music theory.

His wife, Dorothy Zackrisson Swift (1928–1990), was an accomplished musician and poet who wrote the libretto for Swift's opera, The Trial of Tender O'Shea (1964). Richard Swift also set two of her poems in the song cycle Roses Only, conceived as a memorial for her. Her collected poetry was published posthumously.

== Compositions (selective list) ==
- String Trio No. 1, Op. 6 (1954–55)
- String Quartet No. 1 (1955)
- Stravaganza I, for instrumental ensemble (1956)
- Serenade Concertante, for piano and wind quintet (1956)
- Trio, for clarinet, cello, and piano, Op. 14 (1957)
- String Quartet No. 2 (1958)
- Stravaganza II, for piano (1958)
- The Pleasures of Merely Circulating for band (1959)
- Stravaganza III, for clarinet, violin, and piano, Op. 22 (1960)
- Piano Concerto No. 1, Op. 26 (1961)
- Domaines I, for baritone, flute, clarinet, trombone, vibraphone, and cello (texts: Robert Lowell), Op. 29 (1963)
- Domains III, for four groups of instruments, Op. 31 (1963)
- String Quartet No. 3 (1964)
- The Trial of Tender O'Shea, opera in 1 scene (1964)
- Music for a While I, for violin, viola, and harpsichord (1965)
- Planctus, for chorus (soprano, alto, bass), flute, bassoon, viola, and cello (1966)
- Violin Concerto (1968)
- Stravaganza VII, for solo viola (1968)
- Music for a While II, for clarinet, viola, and harpsichord (1969)
- Symphony (1970)
- Thanatopsis, for mezzo-soprano, small four-part chorus and seventeen instruments (text: Titus Lucretius Carus) (1971)
- String Quartet No. 4 (1973)
- Prime, for alto saxophone and chamber ensemble (flute, oboe, trombone, viola, cello, contrabass and harp) (1973)
- Music for a While III, for two instruments (1975)
- Mein blaues Klavier, for piano (1978)
- String Trio No. 2 (1979–80)
- Piano Concerto No. 2 (1980)
- String Quartet No. 5 (1982)
- Elective Affinities for cello and piano (1983)
- The Garden for voice, chamber group (1984)
- Things of August for piano (1985)
- Stravaganza X (for Ernst Krenek's 85th birthday) for piano (1985)
- Serenade Concertante II for clarinet, violin, cello and piano (1985)
- Domainsfor piano (1986)
- Some Versions of Paraphrase for violin, clarinet, and piano (1987)
- In the Country of Blue (Piano Trio II) (1988)
- Voyages II for small chorus (1989)
- Credences of Summer for violin, piano (1989)
- Things of August, for piano (1986)
- Stitch in Time for guitar, piano (1989)
- A Field of Light for eight instruments (1990)
- Roses Only for soprano and small orchestra (1991)
- Music for a While IV for string quartet (1991)
- Radix Matrixfor piano (1992)
- Asphodel, That Greeny Flower solo flute (1992) (see "Asphodel, That Greeny Flower" by William Carlos Williams)
- String Quartet No. 6 (1992)
- Stravaganza XI, for instrumental ensemble (1995)
- Getting Back In for guitar, piano (1997)
- Stravaganza XII for piano (1998)
- Stravaganza XIII for piano (1999)
- Stravaganza XIV for piano (2001)
- Stanzas for 2 pianos (2001)
- Elegies for pianos (2002)

== Writings (selective list) ==
- 1964. "The Demonstrations of J. K. Randall". Perspectives of New Music 2, no. 2 (Spring): 77–86.
- 1976. "Some Aspects of Aggregate Composition". Perspectives of New Music 14, no. 2 / 15, no. 1 ("Sounds and Words. A Critical Celebration of Milton Babbitt at 60") (Spring-Summer/Fall-Winter): 236–248.
- 1977. "1/XII/99: Tonal Relations in Schoenberg's Verklärte Nacht". 19th-Century Music 1, no. 1 (July): 3–14.
- 1978–79. "Mahler's Ninth and Cooke's Tenth", 19th-Century Music 2:165–172.
- 1982–83. "A Tonal Analog: The Tone-Centered Music of George Perle", Perspectives of New Music 21, nos. 1–2: 257–284.
- 1995. "Schoenberg's Second Chamber Symphony, Op. 38". International Journal of Musicology 4:169–181.

=== References ===
Sources

- Fennelly, Brian. 2005. "Swift, Richard", Grove Music Online, edited by Deane Root (updated July 20, 2005; accessed 2 April 2012). (subscription access)
- Morris, Robert D. 1997. "Not Only Rows in Richard Swift's Roses Only". Perspectives of New Music 35, no. 1 (Winter): 13–47.
- Swift, Dorothy Zackrisson. 1992. Poems: 1950–1990. Sacramento: Deason and Stirn.
