= Synare =

Series of electric drum synthesizers

The Synare was a series of electronic drums made by Star Instruments from the mid-1970s through the 1980s. The Synare was a drum synthesizer, meaning that it was essentially a synthesizer, but instead of being controlled by a keyboard, it was triggered by hitting rubber pads that were pressure-sensitive or programmable. Star Instruments, based in Stafford, Connecticut, US, was owned by Norman Millard. Dave Kusek served as chief engineer from 1975 to 1979.

== Models ==
=== The Synare 1 (Synare Percussion Synthesizer | Synare PS | PS1) ===
Four rubber rectangular pads connected to a main module with one oscillator producing pulse and sawtooth waveforms. It also had a white noise generator, Low Frequency Oscillator (LFO) with triangle and pulse waveforms, a mixer and a low-pass filter with Resonance and Cutoff controls. It also had an envelope generator with attack, decay, sustain, and release. Made from 1975 to 1981.

=== The Synare 2 (PS2) ===
This model was manufactured from 1976 to 1982 and was Star's flagship. It was very much like the Synare 1, with one oscillator providing sawtooth, pulse, or white noise. It added assignable functions, such as the ability to route the LFO in order to simultaneously modulate several parameters. The LFO also provided a sawtooth waveform. The pitch of the oscillator could set to a wide range of octaves, then fine tuned with a separate parameter. A major improvement over the Synare 1 was the introduction of a fairly advanced sequencer with multiple patterns, and the ability to change patterns and octaves on the fly. This model also featured twelve pads rather than the four of the Synare 1. The retail price in 1976 was $1,395.00, and as a result the Synare 2 remains a very rare item.

=== The Synare 3 (PS3) ===
Noted for its flying saucer appearance, this was the first affordable model for most musicians. As well as the ability to be run on batteries, the model featured two oscillators with no variable waveforms, a white-noise generator, as well as a sweep function that could be used up or down to achieve a descending booming sound that was used extensively in disco records of the era. Oscillator 1 was the noise generator with a tune function. The amplifier section had volume, attack, and decay controls. This model also had a low-pass filter with cutoff, resonance, and decay controls and was manufactured from 1977 to 1982.

=== The Synare S3X ===
Virtually the same machine as its predecessor, but with more flexible modulation controls. Manufactured during the same time as the Synare 3.

=== The Synare 4 ===
Very similar to its predecessor but with an actual drumhead rather than a rubber pad. Had modulation route and depth controls. Made from approximately 1978–1983. Very rare. Can be seen in video of "Love Don't Live Here Anymore" by Rose Royce.

=== The Synare Lo Tom ===
Variant of the Synare 4.

=== The Synare Sensor ===
A small box that could be mounted to the rim of a drum on a drumset. One VCO that could be pitch modulated by an LFO and an envelope generator.

== Notable users ==
- Alan Myers of Devo
- David Robinson of The Cars
- Gary Numan
- The Cure
- Warren Cann of Ultravox
- Stephen Morris of Joy Division and New Order
- Merzbow
- Layne Rico of Our Daughter's Wedding
- Josh Klinghoffer
- Alan Wilder of Depeche Mode
- Herbie Hancock
- Michael Garrison (Synare 2) on all of his albums up to Point of Impact (1983)
- Jean-Michel Jarre (two Synare 3, Equinoxe 4 Remix video clip)
- Charly Alberti of Soda Stereo
- Nick Banks of Pulp
