= Master Tracks =

Canadian television series

- Genre: Music
- Country of origin: Canada
- Original language: English
- No. of seasons: 2

Production
- Producer: Cullen Fairfield
- Production location: National

Original release
- Network: aux.tv BiteTV
- Release: March 9, 2009 – January 28, 2011

Master Tracks is a Canadian television series where an emerging band is given one day to record a song with acclaimed producers Moe Berg and Laurence Currie. It was launched on aux.tv, a Canadian music website, and BiteTV, a digital cable channel, in March 2009. The show aims to provide viewers with a behind-the-scenes look at how records are produced while profiling new and emerging artists.

Originally airing a preview of its first five episode on Bite TV, it now airs on Aux TV. The channel was launched on October 1, 2009 exclusively on Rogers Cable, with plans to launch on other providers in the future.

== Location ==
The show is filmed entirely in one of North America's premier studios, Metalworks Studios in Mississauga, Ontario Canada. The studio that is used to record the songs on the show is studio 6, and is the studio that is primarily shown. The show has also shot interview segments in other studios throughout Metal Works.

== Episodes ==
Season One
Air Date	Episode
Mar 9, 2009	Shortwave
Mar 23, 2009	Hunter Valentine
Apr 6, 2009	Rachelle
Apr 20, 2009	The North
May 18, 2009	The 3Tards
Oct 5, 2009	Turn Off the Stars
Oct 26, 2009	Everything All The Time
Nov 23, 2009	Big Ideas
Nov 30, 2009	Diemonds
Dec 14, 2009	Mamabolo
Jan 10, 2010	Drive Faster
Jan 18, 2010	Rides Again
Jan 25, 2010	Behind Season One

Season Two
Air Date	Episode
Mar 1, 2010	Teen Tits Wild Wives
Mar 8, 2010	StereoGoesStellar
May 5, 2010	Matt Paxton
Oct 8, 2010	The Ascot Royals
Nov 5, 2010	Spiral Beach
Nov 21, 2010	The Evelyn Room
Dec 4, 2010	People You Know
Dec 23, 2010	Trick of Disaster
	Galore
	Mercy the Sexton
Jan 21, 2011	Jugular
