= Asphodel, That Greeny Flower =

Poem written by William Carlos Williams

"Asphodel, That Greeny Flower" is a poem by American poet William Carlos Williams. It was published in 1955 as part of Williams's anthology Journey to Love.

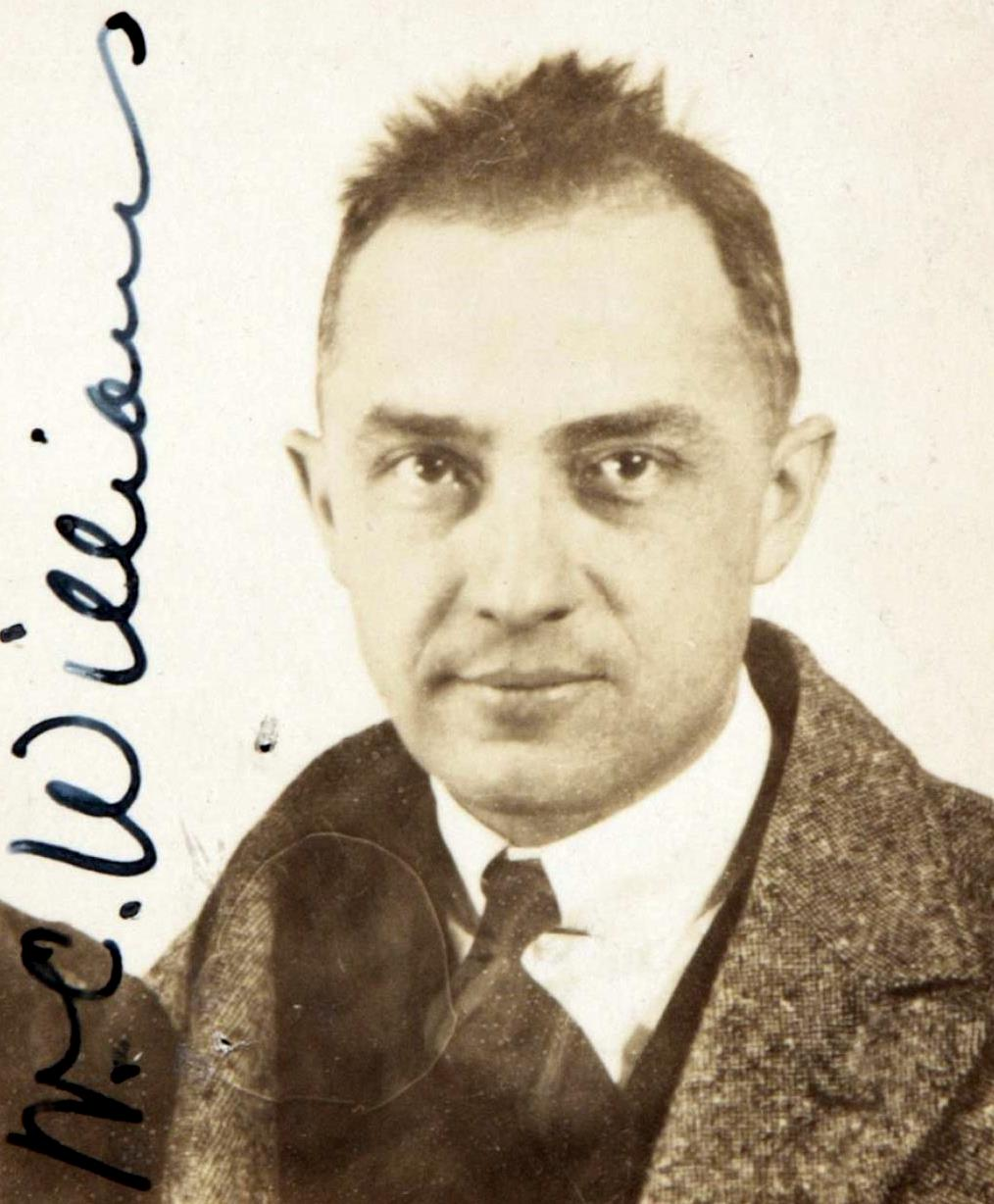
William Carlos Williams in 1921

In Greek mythology, the Asphodel Meadows (Ancient Greek: ἀσφοδελὸς λειμών, romanized: asphodelòs leimṓn) are located in the ancient Greek underworld where most ordinary souls are sent to live after death.

== See also ==
- List of American poets
