= Encore (software) =

Music notation software

- Encore running on Microsoft Windows
- Original author: Don Williams
- Developer: Passport Music Software LLC
- Stable release: 5.0.4 (Windows); 5.0.7 (macOS)
- Operating system: Microsoft Windows, macOS
- Website: https://passportmusic.com/

Encore is a music notation program for Microsoft Windows and macOS.

MusicTime Deluxe is a 'reduced functionality' version of Encore.

Encore is meant to play back music – either imported as MIDI, recorded from a MIDI device, or entered with mouse and keyboard.

== History ==
Encore was originally created for the Apple Macintosh by Don Williams for the US company Passport Designs Inc. of Half Moon Bay, California, and first released in 1984.

Lyrrus Inc., d.b.a. GVOX purchased the intellectual property of Passport in 1998 and Encore 5 was released 10 years after Encore 4.

Encore is notable for being one of the first scorewriter programs to enable items in the musical score to be added and edited using the mouse.

Encore 5 included wizards to create scores for numerous types of ensembles from scratch, MusicXML support (although in now obsolete 1.3 version), use of VST, and J.S. Bach complete works for keyboard in Encore format.

On August 1, 2013, Passport Music Software LLC, acquired the rights of Encore, Music Time Deluxe and MasterTracks Pro.

On June 16, 2022, Sonic Scores, Inc, acquired the rights of Passport Music Software, Encore, Music Time Deluxe and MasterTracks Pro.

== Status ==
Direct competitors in the music notation niche have taken market lead over the last decade, surpassing Encore in features and improved standards. While Encore runs on the latest versions of Windows, it is not compatible with macOS 10.15 (Catalina), and it lacks support in some areas, such as for 4k displays, recent MIDI to USB applications, and later versions of VST.

Passport Music Software, LLC claimed to be reworking Encore, departing from the original code that was created over 20 years ago. With no version updates since at least 2015 (version 5.0.4 for Windows and 5.0.7 for macOS), Passport Music Software closed doors in early 2022.

Following the subsequent acquisition of the product line by Sonic Scores, version 6 of Encore is being developed by its original author, Don Williams, for both Windows and macOS.

== See also ==
- List of music software
- Overture (software), a notation program being developed by the same author, Don Williams, and sharing the original Encore interface
