= Gerd Leonhard =

German futurist and writer

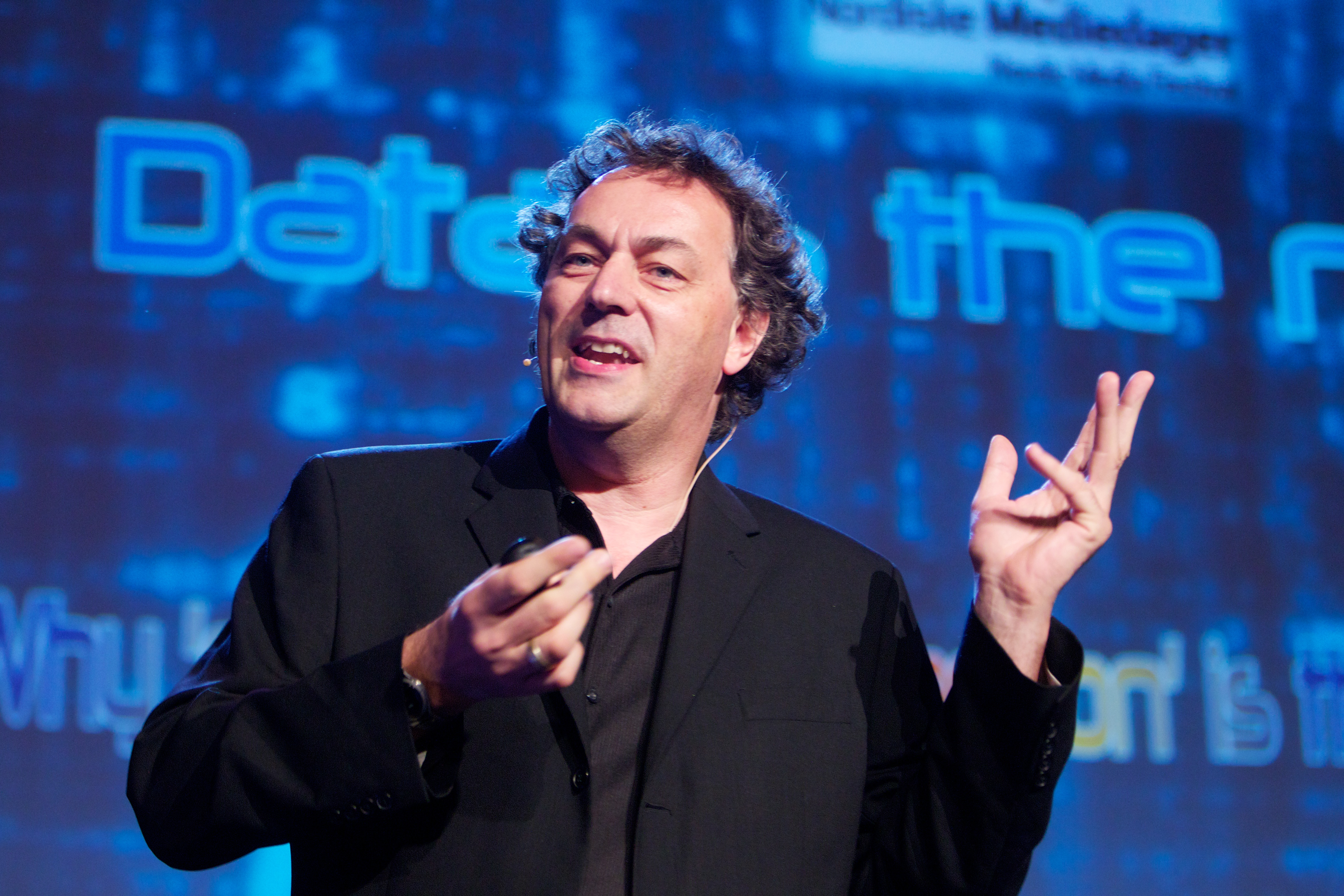
Gerd Leonhard, 2011

Gerd Leonhard is a German futurist, speaker and author who specializes in the debate between humanity and technology. He currently lives in Zurich, Switzerland.

Born in Bonn, Germany, Leonhard studied theology at the University of Bonn before migrating to the United States in 1982 where he studied at the Berklee College of Music and later established a career as a professional musician, arranger and composer. He also set up an early internet business in music, which provided first-hand insights into technology disruption and inspired his first book, co-authored with Dave Kusek, The Future of Music in 2005.

Leonhard evolved his futurist practice, applying these insights to multiple other industries and social environments. Influenced by classic futurists such as Alvin Toffler, Leonhard's work also shows the influence of science fiction authors such as Arthur C. Clarke and William Gibson.

In 2016, he published Technology vs. Humanity, a manifesto for digital rights and an investigation into the many areas of life currently impacted by technology disruption without regulation or policy. Leonhard has expressed views critical of transhumanism and technology centralization. Emphasizing a European tradition of humanist values and philosophy, Leonhard pursues a path of technological balance as evidenced in earlier eras such as the Italian Renaissance. His Open Letter to the Partnership on AI was published in the British magazine Wired in October 2016, calling on technology leaders at IBM, Microsoft, Google, Facebook and Amazon to embrace digital ethics in the emerging era of cognitive automation.
