= Leland Smith =

American musician, teacher, and designer of music engraving program

- Smith in 1976
- Born: Leland Clayton Smith; August 6, 1925; Oakland, California
- Died: December 17, 2013 (aged 88); Palo Alto, California
- Occupations: Musician; Teacher; Computer scientist
- Years active: 1943-2013
- Known for: SCORE (software)

Leland Clayton Smith (August 6, 1925 – December 17, 2013) was an American musician, teacher and computer scientist. He taught at Stanford University for 34 years, and developed the music engraving tool SCORE.

== Career ==
Smith was born in Oakland, California, United States. Showing an early interest in music, after four years of initial study with local teachers he took private lessons in counterpoint, orchestration and composition with Darius Milhaud, who lived near the Smith family. Smith continued studying with Milhaud for two years till he was old enough to join the United States Navy in 1943.

On leaving the Navy in 1946, he studied for a baccalaureate and master's degree in composition under Roger Sessions at University of California, Berkeley, and then went to Paris to study under Olivier Messiaen at the Paris Conservatoire in 1948–9.

Returning to America, he worked predominantly as a bassoonist in New York, but also took occasional work with the San Francisco Opera Orchestra, San Francisco Symphony, and New York City Ballet. He also assisted Milhaud as a teaching assistant at Mills College from 1951 to 1952. Accepting a teaching position at University of Chicago in 1952, Smith taught there till 1958 when he moved to a teaching and research position at Stanford University.

After six years of teaching harmonic analysis and composition at Stanford, Smith won a Fulbright Scholarship to study for a year in Paris. Returning to Stanford in 1965, Smith joined in the work done by John Chowning, Max Mathews, John Pierce and David Poole on computer synthesized music. In 1966, Smith developed an input syntax for MUSIC V that he called SCORE to enable music to be entered more accurately and efficiently into the new system that the team were developing. This was developed into the independent program he called MSS which was the first computer music typesetting program, and which was further developed into the SCORE program. Smith and Chowning, along with John Grey, Loren Rush and Andy Moorer, subsequently founded the Stanford Center for Computer Research in Music and Acoustics (CCRMA).

Smith composed for most of his life. Reviewing Smith's Woodwind Trio in 1974, Richard Swift commented how '...the long arching lines of the Trio, the sensitive and refined shaping of short movements, the twentieth-century Franco-American sonorities of the instruments make a fitting act of homage to Milhaud, but the voice is always Smith's own...'. Reviewing the two motets in 1976, Swift commented that Smith's music 'commands attention by virtue of its imaginative and expressive power and intelligent craft.'

Retiring from Stanford in 1992, Smith continued to develop SCORE and was an enthusiastic supporter of the local donkey sanctuary, until his death in Palo Alto, California, on December 17, 2013.

== Notable publications ==
- Smith, Leland (1972). "SCORE - A Musician's Approach to Computer Music" (PDF). Journal of the Audio Engineering Society. 20 (1): 7–14.
- Smith, Leland (1973). "Editing and Printing Music by Computer". Journal of Music Theory. 17 (2): 292–309. JSTOR 843345.
- Smith, Leland (1979). Handbook of Harmonic Analysis (Second ed.). San Andreas Press. Notable as the first music book typeset entirely by computer.

== Compositions ==
- Introduction and divertimento for five instruments, 1949
- String trio, 1953
- Four etudes for piano, 1966
- Six bagatelles for piano, 1971
- Two motets for mixed chorus, 1972
- Trio for woodwinds, 1973
- Intermezzo and Capriccio for piano, 1976
- Two duets for clarinet and bassoon, 1977
- Suite for trio, 1977
- Sonata for trumpet and piano, 1980
- Twelve etudes for trumpet, 1980
- Wind quintet, 1981
- Three pacifist songs for soprano and piano, 1982
- Sonatina and concert piece for violin and piano, 1982
- Suite for solo viola, 1982
- Sonata for viola and piano, 1982
- Piano sonata, 1984
- Symphony for small orchestra, 1985
