= Berklee Online =

American non-profit organization

- Type: Private university, nonprofit
- Established: 2001; 25 years ago
- Accreditation: New England Commission of Higher Education (NECHE)
- President: Debbie Cavalier
- Academic staff: 250
- Location: Boston, Massachusetts, United States
- Website: Berklee Online

Berklee Online, founded in 2001, is the private, nonprofit online school of Berklee College of Music in Boston that offers music courses, certificates, bachelor's, and master's degree programs. Berklee Online is accredited by the New England Commission of Higher Education (NECHE). Since its inception, Berklee Online has taught more than 75,000 students from 164 countries. It is the largest online music school in the world with more than 18,000 annual enrollments in credit-based courses and more than 3.1 million enrollments in massive open online courses through Coursera, EdX, and Kadenze. As of 2021, Berklee Online has nearly 250 courses and instructors.

== History ==
In the 1960s, Berklee College of Music founder Lawrence Berk started the remote Correspondence Course program that allowed students to complete music theory and arranging courses through the mail.

Berklee Online was established in 2001 when Berklee College of Music's President Lee Berk, Executive Vice President Gary Burton, and the college's board of directors voted and approved the business plan. Upon launch, Dave Kusek was appointed CEO. Berklee Online began as Berkleemusic, and was referred to as such until 2011. Berklee's first online course went live in April 2002 with Music Theory 101, created by Paul Schmeling, Chair Emeritus of the Piano Department of Berklee College of Music. Berklee Online started by offering courses and certificates.

Debbie Cavalier, the former dean of Berkleemusic, was appointed CEO of Berklee Online in 2012 and also serves as the Senior Vice President of Online Learning & Continuing Education for Berklee College of Music.

Berklee Online added bachelor's degree programs in 2014 and announced that they would cost less than half of campus tuition at Berklee College of Music in Boston. They currently offer bachelor's degrees in Music Business, Music Production, Songwriting, Songwriting and Producing Music, Guitar, Interdisciplinary Music Studies, Electronic Music Production and Sound Design, and Music Composition for Film, TV, and Games.

In 2017, Berklee Online added two master's programs: Music Business and Music Production. The master's programs are designed to be completed in one year for full-time students, with part-time options available. Students pursuing a Master of Arts in Music Business learn about artist management, marketing, licensing, branding, and concert touring, with instructors like SiriusXM's Director of Music Licensing Casey Rae. Those earning a Master of Music in Music Production learn advanced recording, mixing, and mastering, vocal production, and audio for visual media, with faculty including Sean Slade. In 2019, a master's degree in Film Scoring was added with the first class in January 2020.

In 2019, Berklee Online announced that female enrollment grew by 65 percent over two years and the rate of female instructors and staff grew from 28 percent in 2012 to 33 percent in 2018.

When former Berklee College of Music President, Roger H. Brown announced his 2021 retirement, he said Berklee Online is going to be a big part of the future of Berklee College of Music and making education more affordable.

In October 2020, Berklee announced that Erica Muhl would be the college's first female president. Her term started in July 2021.

Berklee Online added a fourth graduate degree offering in 2021, with its Master of Arts in Songwriting degree program, directed by Grammy-winning songwriter and chair of Berklee's Songwriting department, Bonnie Hayes.

== Notable people ==
The courses at Berklee Online are written and taught by faculty members of Berklee College of Music, as well as industry professionals including:

- Prince Charles Alexander, music producer and audio engineer
- Gary Burton, jazz vibraphonist, composer, and educator
- Brad Hatfield, musician, arranger, and composer
- Bonnie Hayes, singer-songwriter, musician and record producer
- Susan Rogers, professor, sound engineer and record producer, Prince's staff engineer (1983–1987)
- Sean Slade, record producer, engineer, and mixer, co-produced Radiohead's debut album, Pablo Honey, featuring the song "Creep"
- John Storyk, architect and acoustician, has designed for Whitney Houston, Bob Marley, and Jimi Hendrix
- Pinar Toprak, composer for film, television and video games. Scored Captain Marvel (2019)
- Steve Vai, three-time Grammy Award winning guitarist and producer
- John Whynot, musician, producer, engineer, film score mixer and composer. Mixed The Last of the Mohicans (1992).
- Gabrielle Goodman singer, songwriter producer, worked closely with Roberta Flack, Chaka Khan, Patti Labelle

Notable students include:

- Alessandro Cortini, former keyboardist Nine Inch Nails
- Train (band)
- Members of Sugarland
- Portugal. The Man
- Stefan Lessard, bassist for Dave Matthews Band
- Trey Anastasio, Phish
- Fraser T. Smith
- Kip Winger
- Shalom "J.Storm" Miller

Notable staff include:

- Debbie Cavalier, Senior Vice President of Online Learning / CEO Berklee Online
- Sean Hagon, Dean for Pre-College, Online and Professional Programs

== Awards and rankings ==
From 2005 to 2012, the University Professional Continuing Education Association (UPCEA) awarded Berklee Online with its Best Online College Course Award. In 2018, Berklee's Office of Institutional Research and Assessment (OIRA) conducted an exit survey of graduating students, and found that Berklee Online has a 97 percent student satisfaction rate.
