= Conrad Salinger =

American composer and film musical orchestrator

Conrad Salinger (August 30, 1901, Brookline, Massachusetts – June 17, 1962, Pacific Palisades, California) was an American arranger, orchestrator and composer, who studied classical composition at the Paris Conservatoire. He is credited with orchestrating nine productions on Broadway from 1931 to 1938, and over seventy-five motion pictures from 1931 to 1962. Film scholar Clive Hirschhorn considers him the finest orchestrator ever to work in the movies. Early in his career, film composer John Williams spent much time around Salinger.

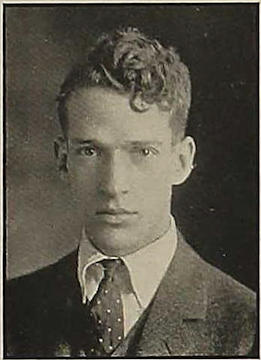
Conrad Salinger in 1923

== Hollywood career ==
During his Broadway apprenticeship Salinger first came across Johnny Green, his future MGM musical director, when they were recording motion picture overtures in the early days of sound at New York to be shown before the main features began. Salinger first came out to Hollywood in the late 1930s to work for Alfred Newman (e.g. Born to Dance and Gunga Din) and also collaborated with the famed Broadway orchestrator Robert Russell Bennett on the arrangements for Fred Astaire and Ginger Rogers' 1938 dance picture Carefree.

Salinger is recognized as MGM's best principal orchestrator of musicals made between 1942 and 1962. He reputedly studied mathematical musical progressions under the influential theorist Joseph Schillinger, whose other students included George Gershwin, and major Broadway/Hollywood orchestrators such as Ted Royal, Edward B. Powell, and Herbert W. Spencer. Salinger employed a somewhat smaller orchestra than usual but nevertheless achieved a rich, elaborately constructed sound in his arrangements. The fact the orchestra Salinger used was smaller in size than the normal huge studio orchestra was practically unnoticeable, except that the quality of the orchestral sound on films that Salinger worked on seemed greatly improved, with much less distortion than was common in the days before true high fidelity.

However, in Hugh Fordin's The World of Entertainment: The Freed Unit at MGM, a 1975 book dealing with the MGM musicals, composer-conductor Adolph Deutsch, who worked with Salinger on more than one film, criticized his orchestrations for the Jerome Kern 1946 biopic Till the Clouds Roll By as being "too elaborate" for a composer like Kern (a criticism that Salinger reportedly did not take well) and recounted he would only work with Salinger on the 1951 film version of Show Boat (music by Kern) if he "simplified" his style of orchestration. (The two patched it up and did work on that film and subsequent others, receiving a joint Academy Award nomination for it.)

Salinger orchestrated most of the musicals that MGM is famous for; among them, in addition to the 1951 Show Boat, were Girl Crazy (the 1943 version), Meet Me in St. Louis (1944) (which included a memorable arrangement of The Trolley Song), Anchors Aweigh (1945), the 1947 film version of Good News, Summer Holiday (1948), the 1949 film version of On the Town, the 1950 film version of Annie Get Your Gun, Singin' in the Rain (1952), the 1953 film version of Kiss Me, Kate, Seven Brides for Seven Brothers (1954), An American in Paris (1951), The Band Wagon (1953), Gene Kelly's pioneering 1956 all-ballet film Invitation to the Dance and the original film musical Gigi (1958). His lush scoring for the ballet sequences in Lerner and Loewe's Brigadoon (1954) have come to be regarded as high points of the orchestrator's art in the Golden Age of musicals.

== Recognition ==
Although many of the films Salinger worked on were Oscar-nominated for the adaptation of the music featured in them, according to industry practices at the time, nominations usually went to the musical directors/conductors of the music (such as Adolph Deutsch or André Previn), and not to orchestrators. Only once was Salinger nominated, for his Show Boat orchestrations. Ironically, the film An American in Paris, which Salinger also orchestrated, was nominated for the same award that year, so the two films were competing against each other in the Oscar race. But in the case of An American in Paris, the nomination went only to Johnny Green, who conducted the George Gershwin music heard in the film, and not to Salinger. Green won that year; Salinger never received an Oscar.

Despite this lack of popular recognition during his lifetime, Salinger was highly regarded within the film music industry; working steadily and occasionally uncredited (e.g. The Big Country for Jerome Moross). He was content to collaborate with some of the jazzier arrangers on the lot, most frequently Skip Martin and once memorably with Nelson Riddle for High Society (1956). Salinger orchestrated for film the music of all the major popular composers of the mid-20th century, including Irving Berlin, George Gershwin, Rodgers and Hart and Cole Porter. His work on the 1948 biopic Words and Music, led Richard Rodgers to publicly applaud the way their songs were orchestrated and presented. Barbra Streisand insisted on reusing his original orchestrations when they could be found and colleagues, including Stanley Donen, Debbie Reynolds, Johnny Green and André Previn, have subsequently paid tribute to his musical abilities.

Salinger's contributions have gained wider public recognition since the 1970s with the release of the That's Entertainment! compilation films and many of the original soundtracks of his scores on compact discs. The British conductor John Wilson has also been repopularizing his work in a series of concerts and recordings featuring reconstructions of the original orchestrations of the MGM classics.

== Final credits ==
Salinger died suddenly in 1962, under disputed circumstances. The Internet Movie Database states that he had a heart attack in his sleep, but it is claimed that Salinger committed suicide. He lost his home in the 1961 Bel Air Fire, which police believe may have contributed to his despondency.

The last film that he worked on was Billy Rose's Jumbo, released in 1962. It was not a big success, either critically or commercially. The film was based on a 1935 Rodgers and Hart stage musical than ran less than a year, although the show did produce three enduring and often recorded standards, "My Romance," "Little Girl Blue," and "The Most Beautiful Girl in the World."

Salinger also composed original music for film and television. Among the A-list film scores he wrote was the 1953 romantic comedy Dream Wife and the 1958 drama Lonelyhearts; some of the TV scores he worked on were those for the late 1950s series Wagon Train and Bachelor Father.
