= Joshua W. Turner =

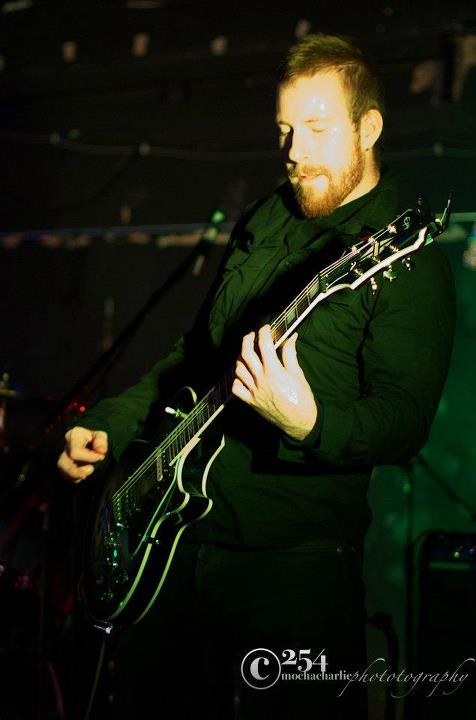
- Born: Joshua Williams Turner; September 16, 1988 (age 38); Greenwood, California
- Education: Christian Leaders Institute - Bachelor's in Divinity Presence College - Christian Counseling Certification Musicians Institute - Guitar Performance Berklee College of Music - Vocal Performance
- Occupations: singer/songwriter, musician, life coach, pastor
- Years active: 2006-present

Joshua W. Turner (born September 16th, 1988) is an American singer/songwriter and life coach based out of the Seattle, Washington area. He is best known as the creative force behind the rock band We Wept, which channels a gritty, atmospheric Pacific Northwest grunge sound.

== Early life ==
Turner was born in California and moved to Whidbey Island, Washington at the age of one with his parents and brother. Growing up, he developed a deep appreciation for music, which eventually led him to pick up the guitar at age 15 after a friend showed him a simple version of “Adam’s Song” by Blink-182. Shortly after learning his first chords, Turner experienced his first heartbreak following the end of a relationship—an event that became a turning point in his life.

He immersed himself fully in music, sometimes dedicating six to eight hours a day to practicing and refining his craft. During this time, he began writing original songs and recording them using a Fostex MR8 digital recording console, often playing all of the instruments himself. Demonstrating early entrepreneurial initiative, Turner independently produced and distributed his own CDs, selling them throughout his high school using the moniker Josh Plus, which he released his first album under. He then changed his moniker to Eraseher for his second album release.

In 2006, Turner applied to Berklee College of Music and was accepted into the vocal program, marking a significant step forward in his musical journey.

== Music Education and Professional Music ==
While attending Berklee College of Music, Turner was invited to perform at the Berklee Pop/Rock Showcase at the Berklee Performance Center, where he delivered a standout rendition of Guns N’ Roses’ “Civil War.” In recognition of his performance, he was awarded the Berklee Achievement Scholarship. During his time at Berklee, Turner also formed the first lineup of his band, Eyes to Earth. After two years, Turner left Berklee and relocated to Hollywood to study guitar at Musicians Institute. While there, he was recruited as the lead vocalist for Smokin Guns, a Guns N’ Roses–inspired rock band. However, after immersing himself in the Hollywood rock scene, Turner became disillusioned and ultimately chose to return to Seattle.

Back in Seattle, Turner joined the local pop-rock band In Cahoots as lead guitarist. With the group, he performed extensively throughout the Seattle club circuit, including notable venues such as the Hard Rock Café Seattle, Neumos, and The Crocodile, and also appeared at the Seattle Rock ’n’ Roll Marathon. In 2012, In Cahoots signed with Critical Sun Records and performed at the SXSW Festival in Austin, Texas.

== Music Career ==
=== Eyes To Earth ===
Turner formed the band Eyes To Earth during his time at Berklee College of Music. The group represented his early exploration into alternative and rock music, blending melodic songwriting with emotionally driven themes. This period marked the beginning of Turner’s collaborative work in a band setting and laid the foundation for his later independent projects.

=== Josh North ===
Following his time in formal education and early band experiences, Turner released music under the name Josh North. This project reflected a transitional phase in his career, exploring a broader sonic palette and developing his identity as a songwriter and independent artist. The material often focused on personal themes and marked a shift toward a more self-directed creative process. Joshua eventually dropped the moniker of Josh North, continuing his solo music under his birth name Joshua W. Turner.

=== Joshua W. Turner Solo Work ===
In addition to his work in rock-oriented projects, Joshua W. Turner has developed a solo career as a singer-songwriter, characterized by acoustic-driven compositions and introspective lyricism. His solo material blends elements of contemporary singer-songwriter, alternative, and pop-influenced rock.

Turner’s solo work emphasizes themes of personal reflection, relationships, faith, and emotional resilience. His songwriting approach often centers on melodic structures and narrative-driven lyrics, distinguishing it from the heavier sound associated with his later project We Wept.

In 2021, Turner released multiple solo projects, including the studio album Be Ok and the extended play Dawn. These releases marked a period of prolific output and established the foundation of his independent solo catalog. During the same year, he also released several singles, including “She’s My Wife,” “Never There,” “Too Far Gone,” and “Too Far Gone (Reprise).”

Turner continued his solo work with the release of the album Somebody’s Listening in 2025, further expanding his catalog of independently produced music. His solo recordings are typically self-produced, reflecting a do-it-yourself approach to songwriting and production.

Across his solo discography, Turner’s music is noted for its emphasis on authenticity and emotional transparency, often exploring themes of longing, hope, and personal growth. His work in this genre represents a distinct counterpart to his heavier musical projects, showcasing a more stripped-down and melodic expression of his artistry.

=== We Wept ===
Turner is best known for his project We Wept, a Seattle-based independent hard rock and grunge project. As the primary songwriter, producer, and multi-instrumentalist, Turner operates the project largely as a solo endeavor.

The music of We Wept blends elements of 1990s-inspired grunge and alternative rock with themes of faith, trauma, healing, and personal struggle. The project has been described as a “voice for the broken,” combining heavy instrumentation with emotionally transparent and spiritually reflective lyrics.

In July 2026, We Wept released their much anticipated Guardian EP album further establishing the project’s identity within the independent Christian rock and grunge scene.

=== Mr. Josh ===
In addition to his work in rock music, Turner creates children's music under the name Mr. Josh. This project focuses on emotional awareness, education, and positive messaging for young audiences. His songs often address feelings such as sadness, anger, excitement, and loneliness, aiming to help children understand and express emotions in a healthy way.

=== Musical style and themes ===
Turner’s work spans multiple genres, including hard rock, grunge, alternative, and children's educational music. Across his projects, recurring themes include faith, identity, emotional struggle, healing, and purpose.

His rock-oriented work, particularly with We Wept, draws influence from 1990s grunge bands and emphasizes raw, guitar-driven soundscapes paired with introspective and spiritually influenced lyrics.

=== Other work ===
Outside of music, Turner holds a Bachelor’s degree in Divinity with a double major in Biblical Theology and Ministry. He is also an ordained minister (pastor) through the Christian Leaders Alliance and serves in a pastoral counseling capacity. In addition, Turner is a certified Christian Counselor, offering faith-based, conversational support focused on personal growth, emotional healing, and spiritual encouragement.

Turner Life Coaching is a personal coaching service founded by Joshua W. Turner that focuses on helping people work through life challenges and find direction, clarity, and emotional support. It is designed as a safe, supportive space for individuals navigating things like trauma, addiction and recovery, anxiety and depression, grief, low self-esteem, loneliness, feeling stuck or lacking purpose, as well as faith challenges or church hurt. The coaching approach is conversational and goal-oriented, centered on helping people process what they're going through and take practical steps forward in their personal growth and healing journey.

== Discography ==
=== Solo discography ===
- Be OK (2018 / re-released 2021) Turner’s debut solo album Be OK is a singer-songwriter record featuring acoustic and pop-influenced arrangements. It was self-written, recorded, and produced by Turner.
- Dawn EP (2021) A solo EP featuring acoustic-driven songwriting and personal themes, released independently.
- He Finds The Beauty In The Broken (2021) A Christian worship album.
- Somebody’s Listening (2025) A later full-length solo album continuing Turner’s independent singer-songwriter style.
- “She’s My Wife” (2021) - Single
- “Never There” (2021) - Single
- “Too Far Gone” (2021) - Single
- “Too Far Gone (Reprise)” (2021) - Single
- “Pick Up The Pieces" (2024) - Single
- ““Pick Up The Pieces" feat. reeltylerb - Alternative Version (2024) - Single

=== Mr. Josh discography ===
- Feelings (2017) A children’s music album released independently by American musician Joshua W. Turner under the stage name Mr. Josh.

=== We Wept discography ===
- We Wept EP (2025) Self-titled EP featuring early core tracks of the project, including grunge-influenced hard rock compositions written, performed, and produced primarily by Joshua W. Turner.
- “Not Satisfied” (2024) - Single
- “Gotta Lotta” (2025) - Single
- “Desperate” (2025) - Single
- “Big God” (2025) - Single
- “Safe House” (2025) - Single
- “Bury Me” (2025) - Single
- “Live For You” (2026) - Single
- Guardian EP (2026) A three song EP album that sonically showcases another side of the band focusing less on pedal to the metal rock, and more on vulnerability and storytelling.

=== Legacy and impact ===
Joshua W. Turner’s body of work reflects a multidisciplinary approach to music, combining artistic expression with themes of faith, emotional health, and personal transformation. Through his diverse projects, he has engaged audiences ranging from listeners of alternative rock to children and families, maintaining a consistent focus on authenticity and purpose-driven creativity.
