= Edward B. Powell =

American film orchestrator and composer

Edward Benson Powell (December 5, 1909, in Savanna, Carroll County, Illinois – February 28, 1984, in Woodland Hills, Los Angeles) was an American arranger, orchestrator and composer, who served as Alfred Newman's musical lieutenant at 20th Century Fox film studios for over three decades. His contributions to the scores of 400 films culminated in the canon of widescreen Rodgers and Hammerstein musicals of the late 1950s, for which his arrangements, such as the extended "Carousel Waltz" (with Gus Levene), continue to be revived in concerts and proms (e.g. John Wilson Orchestra), as well as live-to-classic pictures (Carl Davis Chaplin tour). Powell was occasionally credited as Ed or without the middle initial, but his friends invariably called him Eddie.

A shrewd contemporary, the fellow composer and renaissance man Oscar Levant, wrote of him as being a noted film-music specialist on a par with the likes of Max Steiner, Franz Waxman and Hugo Friedhofer. Musicologist Ian Sapiro firmly places him in the ranks of the “geniuses” who were largely responsible for the recognizable studio system orchestral sound of the Golden Age. One of film composer John Williams’ early professional engagements was playing piano on, and assisting Powell with the sweeping arrangements recorded for the roadshow 6-track magnetic soundtrack of Carousel.

== Broadway years ==
As a self-taught high school dance band arranger, he first came to the attention of jazzman Fletcher Henderson. Starting professionally in the early thirties as part of the stable of Harms-Chappell orchestrators on Broadway, Powell quickly came into contact with lifelong colleagues, most of whom were eventually lured to Hollywood. He garnered strong credits in popular reviews and musicals staged by Earl Carroll, and separately B.G. DeSylva and Henderson and Brown, as well as a Ballet Russe choreographed by Leonide Massine. Like George Gershwin, Conrad Salinger and Herbert W. Spencer, Powell was an avid student of the influential composer-theorist Joseph Schillinger. In 1933 Powell orchestrated the Gershwin brothers’ Broadway show Let 'Em Eat Cake, using the Schillinger contrapuntal system, and was invited by the composer to handle the same chores for the premiere of Porgy and Bess; however, had to decline when he moved out to Hollywood a year later.

== Hollywood career ==
Joining as an uncredited orchestrator at United Artists where Newman already was house composer, an early project was Eddie Cantor’s Kid Millions, where he shared song arranging duties with the young Roger Edens (in his days before joining MGM’s Freed unit). He also ventured out with other composers and musical directors including Max Steiner (The Garden of Allah, 1936), got to work with Fred Astaire in Irving Berlin’s Top Hat and received his first screen credit for Eleanor Powell’s (no relation) Broadway Melody of 1936. More highbrow, he was sole orchestrator for the experimental ballet film Spring Night choreographed and danced by David Lichine as Pan and conducted by Constantin Bakaleinikoff.

In 1936 he recommended ex-Chappell colleague David Raksin join Newman’s unit and together they shared duties as the arrangers of Charlie Chaplin’s beloved music in his first fully soundtracked (if not very talkie) film Modern Times.

After the Gershwins tried their luck in motion pictures, Powell became a good friend of the composer and was often a guest at their home. While working on The Goldwyn Follies of 1938, he got to introduce settings for the last songs composed by Gershwin - “Love is Here to Stay” and “Love Walked In” - plus George Balanchine’s groundbreaking Technicolor ballets featuring Vera Zorina.

At the close of the decade, he also collaborated with Robert Russell Bennett and Conrad Salinger as the powerhouse trio of (unbilled) orchestrators for Newman’s original music to George Stevens' Gunga Din.

Throughout the 1940s Powell lobbied on behalf of fellow orchestrators for royalties and advised on ways to modernize copyright law, serving a short stint as President of American Society of Music Arrangers from 1946 to 47.

== Musical arrangement technique ==
Powell was also a leading member of a close group of Hollywood orchestrators whom Levant identified as “the boys”—principally Friedhofer, Salinger, Spencer and Raksin—that met in each other's homes or lot bungalows to listen to latest overseas symphonic records, break down instrumentations chosen and analyze the effects various combinations produced on the texture and transformation of a theme, phrase or leitmotif (the works of Hindemith, Ravel and Sibelius being particular favorites). Powell continued his musical analyses as a student of Arnold Schoenberg, who lived across the road from Gershwin when they both resided in West Los Angeles. Powell even kept a standing order with an L.A. record importer to supply him with “everything interesting” from which they could pick up the latest trends in contemporary music.

One of many highly regarded close collaborations with Newman was for the Oscar-winning score heard in The Song of Bernadette (1943), particularly the vision scenes and sacred music. Based on interviews and analysis, Roland Jackson believes Powell's special credit for orchestral arrangements was due to his contributions going ‘beyond orchestration and involving reworking of the key themes, adding counterpoints or variants, and occasionally bringing in new material of his own.’ David Newman told Maurizio Caschetto that Powell helped his father, initially a conductor, learn how to confidently write music.

== Major R&H film musicals ==
After the studio won filming rights to the Rodgers and Hammerstein oeuvre which was coming out of embargo after first staged productions, it fell to Newman, Powell and their growing team of orchestrators to expand the musical palette from its origins for smaller pit-bands. Although Powell was known for his full-blooded and colorful use of prominent brass and drums (Overture to The King and I; “Bali Ha'i”; Flower Drum Song’s “Dream Ballet”) he could also arrange charts for more intimate songs such as “If I Loved You” or “Younger Than Springtime”. Powell described their approach to Fred Steiner in 1975:

“[I]n a very intimate scene, Al[fred Newman] would really write to the dialogue very carefully so the music breathed with it. [T]here was no movement in the orchestra under certain words – like you were accompanying at the piano in a small nightclub or something. He would try to play…that the background of the music was also part of the set…the costumes…and the whole atmosphere of the scene. [I]t became a part of the whole aural and visual scene.”

== Final credits ==
Later in his career he worked more frequently with other composers and music supervisors, including Alex North or Lionel and Emil, Newman's equally talented brothers. He orchestrated his friend and colleague Hugo Friedhofer‘s martial theme for the 1959 Oscar-nominated score of the war drama The Young Lions, costarring Marlon Brando and Montgomery Clift.

In some of Powell's more bizarre assignments, he received screen credit along with Lyn Murray and Arthur Morton for Snow White and the Three Stooges. And he and screenwriter Clifford Odets memorably lent their considerable talents to the Elvis Presley vehicle Wild in the Country. Eddie's final recorded orchestration credit was in 1968 for the Dominic Frontiere score to the Clint Eastwood’s Malpaso Productions’ first film Hang 'Em High.
