= Jim Lucchese =

American music industry executive and academic administrator

President of the Berklee College of Music
- Incumbent
- Assumed office January 1, 2025

Personal details
- Education: Boston College (BA); Georgetown University (JD)

Jim Lucchese is an American music industry executive and academic administrator who has served as the president of the Berklee College of Music since January 2025.

After graduating from the Georgetown University Law Center, Lucchese worked as an attorney representing musical artists in record deals, licensing, and other matters at the law firm Greenberg Traurig. In 2007, he became CEO of The Echo Nest, a music data platform that was acquired by Spotify in 2014. He then led the Spotify for Artists program.

== Education and early career ==
In 1989, Lucchese participated in a summer program for music at Berklee. He attended Boston College, graduating with a BA in English and music in 1994.

Lucchese later attended Georgetown University Law Center, graduating in 2005 with a JD, magna cum laude. He joined the law firm Greenberg Traurig representing artists in transactions.

== Echo Nest and Spotify ==
In 2007, Lucchese became CEO of Echo Nest, a company that developed an API for music personalization and discovery. Echo Nest was acquired by Spotify in 2014 in a transaction that was described as streamlining the implementation of music discovery features in the Spotify service.

Following the acquisition, Lucchese stayed on with Spotify to lead the company's "Creator" feature, later renamed Spotify for Artists, which gave data tools and insights to artists and managers.
