= William S. Burroughs and the Cult of Rock 'n' Roll =

Non-fiction book by Casey Rae

- First edition cover
- Author: Casey Rae
- Publisher: University of Texas Press
- Publication date: June 11, 2019
- ISBN: 978-1-4773-1650-4

William S. Burroughs and the Cult of Rock ‘n’ Roll is a non-fiction book by American author and musician Casey Rae that examines the influence of the Beat writer William S. Burroughs on the evolution of rock music and counterculture. Through a mix of literary analysis, historical narrative, music criticism, and cultural commentary, Rae explores how Burroughs’ transgressive ideas, experimental writing techniques, and persona as a countercultural icon resonated with rock musicians and shaped key movements in music and art.

== Overview ==
The book highlights Burroughs’ collaborations in music that connected Burroughs to the evolution of popular and underground music. Rae positions Burroughs not only as a literary innovator but also as a spiritual godfather to the rebellious ethos of rock ‘n’ roll and its genre offshoots such as punk, industrial, hip-hop, and electronic music.

== Themes ==
William S. Burroughs and the Cult of Rock ‘n’ Roll explores several interwoven themes:

Cut-Up Technique and Sonic Experimentation: Rae traces how Burroughs’ cut-up method, co-established with visual artist Brion Gysin, influenced musicians like Bowie and the industrial band Throbbing Gristle, encouraging experimentation via sonic and lyrical fragmentation and recontextualizing.

Outlaws and Countercultural Icons: Burroughs’ life as a queer, drug-using provocateur made him a renegade with regard to societal norms, an appeal that resonated deeply with rock artists seeking to challenge the status quo.

Interdisciplinary Collaboration: The book explores Burroughs’ forays into sound art, spoken-word albums, and multimedia projects, drawing parallels between his work and the evolution of music production and performance.

Visionary States and Rock's Mystique: Rae highlights Burroughs’ exploration of magic, mysticism, and outsider philosophies, showing how these themes mirrored rock ‘n’ roll's fascination with the esoteric, alongside Burroughs' use of occult techniques to weaken and erode sociopolitical institutions.

== Critical reception ==
William S. Burroughs and the Cult of Rock ‘n’ Roll received critical acclaim for its exploration of Burroughs’ influence on music and culture. The New York Times highlighted the book's innovative approach, noting that by tracing Burroughs’ interactions with the rock ‘n’ roll scene, the author unveils “a kind of alternative history.” Billboard praised Rae's combination of personal reflections and scholarly research, stating that he “has unearthed a trove of information sure to shake the foundation of even the most die-hard Burroughs junkie or rock fanatic.” NPR commended Rae's passionate and controlled writing, asserting that the book “celebrates not only the gifted mind and bizarre life of a writer who changed literature forever with his magic and ideas; it also finally gives him the place he deserves in the pantheon of rock and roll.” Kirkus Reviews acknowledged the book's compelling narrative, remarking that it “nudges a legendary legacy from the cultural margins toward the mainstream.”
