= Ted Royal =

American orchestrator, conductor and composer

Ted Royal [Dewar] (6 September 1904, Skedee, Oklahoma - 27 March (?) 1981) was an American orchestrator, conductor and composer for Broadway theatre. He was most active in the 1940s and 1950s, being associated with the very successful original productions of Lerner and Loewe's Brigadoon and Paint Your Wagon. Together with George Bassman he orchestrated Frank Loesser's Guys and Dolls. The dean of musical orchestrators, Robert Russell Bennett, remembered Royal as "one of Broadway's very special arrangers."

== Big band days ==
Royal may have also been known in New York under the name of Ted Klinefelter. He majored in music at the University of Kansas and completed further studies in Houston and New York, including a correspondence course in the mathematical musical progressions advanced by the influential theorist Joseph Schillinger, who had also taught George Gershwin.

After floating around as a sideman in various minstrel shows, Royal settled down as alto sax in the Ted Weems orchestra. He began writing big-band charts for Weems as well as Tommy Dorsey, Paul Whiteman and Harry James. By 1935 Royal was hosting his own radio show in New York and fronted an orchestra which often played on Long Island. However, he may have run into unemployment and financial troubles in the economic downturn of 1937.

== Broadway career ==
In 1938 he started arranging music for theater in Fort Worth, Texas. Returning to New York to work on Billy Rose's Aquacade for the World's Fair, he came to the attention of Max Dreyfus who ran the in-demand theater orchestration department at Chappell Music. In just two weeks his hard-working team could orchestrate the average musicomedy for the price of $6,000. Dreyfus signed Royal as a house orchestrator and in 1939 he moved into the same building with Robert Russell Bennett, Don Walker and Hans Spialek.

His legitimate Broadway start was assisting Spialek and Walker with the orchestration duties for the George White Scandals of 1939, featuring Ella Logan, Ann Miller and The Three Stooges. Quickly followed high-profile collaborations with Russell Bennett on Buddy DeSylva's DuBarry Was a Lady and Mike Todd's Mexican Hayride. He was also a valued "hot jazz" and swing exponent for the team of orchestrators who worked on Annie Get Your Gun and Leonard Bernstein's breakthrough On the Town. Steven Suskin has confirmed that Royal was responsible for arranging the show-stopping Ethel Merman anthem "There's No Business Like Show Business".

By 1947 Royal went out on his own and struck it big with his sole credit for the atmospheric orchestrations heard in Brigadoon. Other principal orchestration credits were for Loesser's first show Where's Charley?, Harold Arlen's House of Flowers, the cult classic Flahooley and Mr. Wonderful, headlining Sammy Davis Jr. With Charles L. Cooke he came up with the right 1920s sounds for Sandy Wilson's The Boy Friend.

In 1952, he arranged the music for New Faces of 1952 on Broadway, starring Eartha Kitt. His arrangements can be heard on the original cast recording album. He also did the orchestrations for the 1957 musical, Rumple.

== Final credits ==
Personal problems, including the death of his only daughter on her honeymoon, started to impinge upon his career and there were fewer assignments in the 1960s. He accepted minor arranging chores from Irwin Kostal for forgettable television programs and did the scores for a pair of silent film compilations.

During the late 1940s, Royal had taught composition and arranging at the Juilliard School and in his retirement wrote a couple of unfinished textbooks on orchestration, which are in his papers at the Music & Performing Arts Section of the New York Public Library.
