= Fenway Theatre =

Coordinates: 42°20′49.26″N 71°5′15.26″W

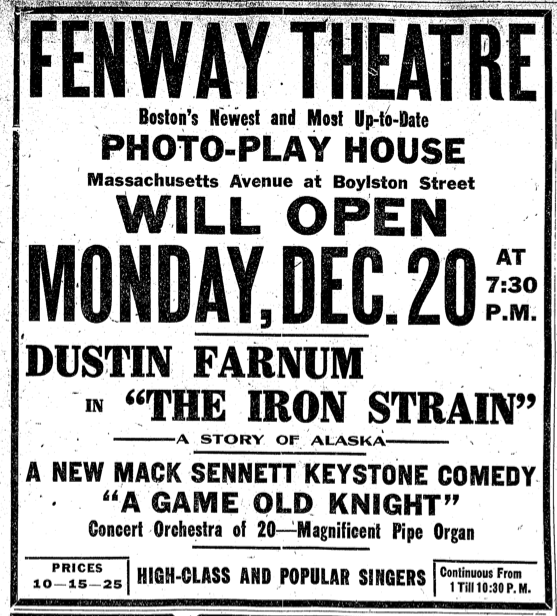
A 1915 advertisement for a Dustin Farnum production

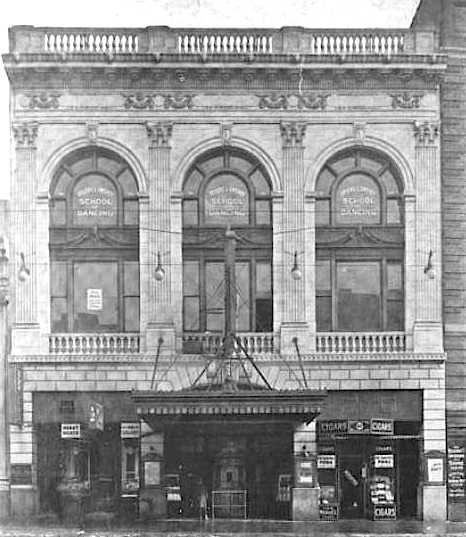
Fenway Theatre in Boston, c. 1918

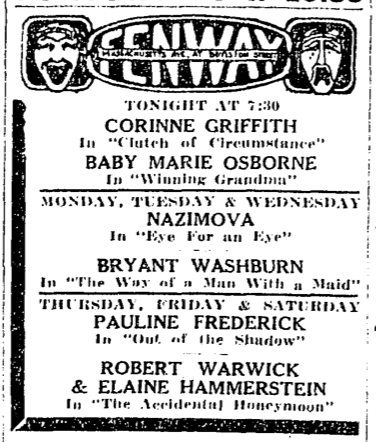
A 1919 advertisement for the theatre

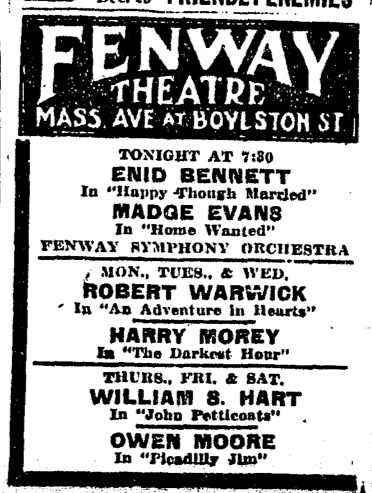
A 1919 advertisement for the theatre

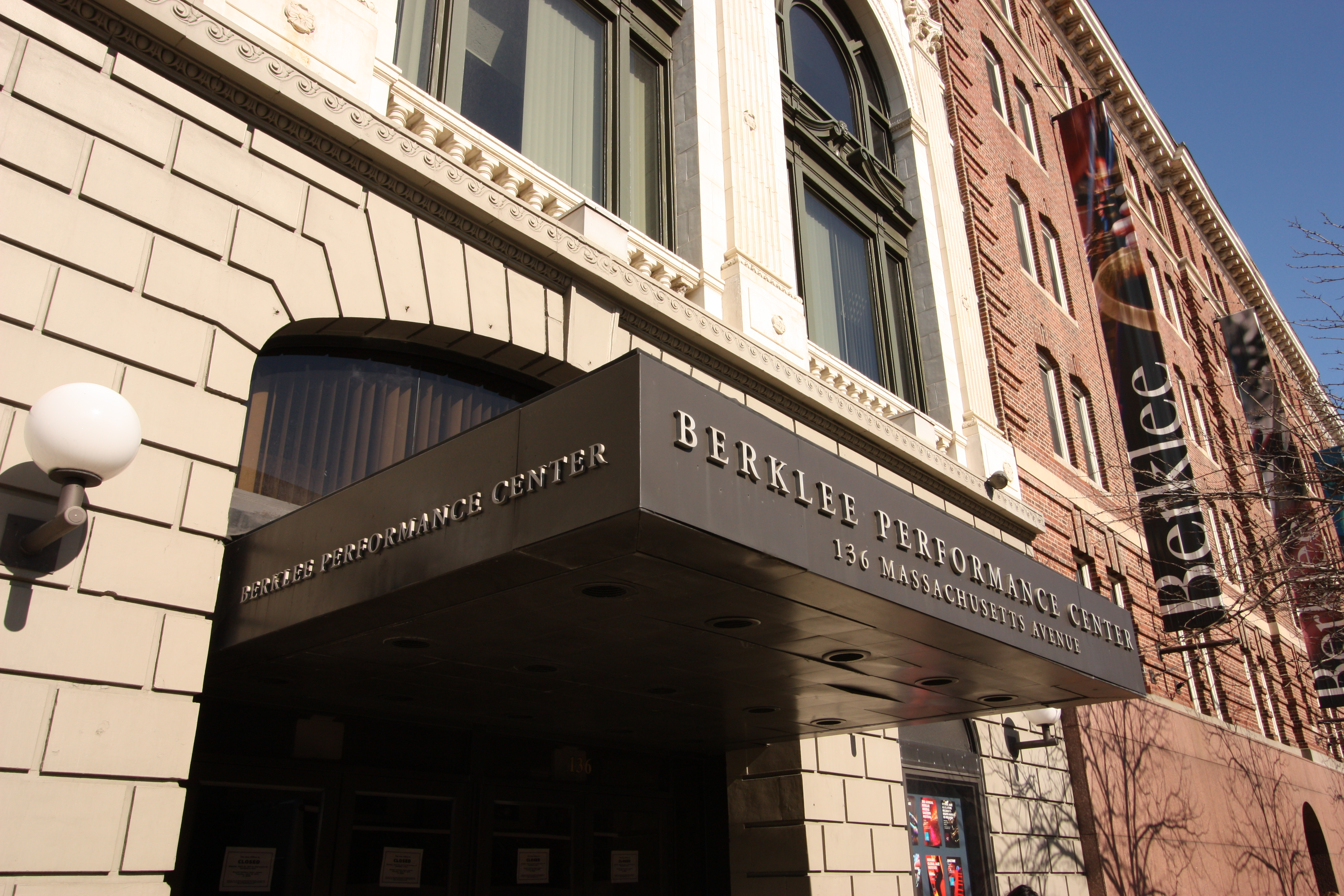
The Massachusetts Avenue entrance to Berklee Performance Center in 2011

The Fenway Theatre (1915–1972) of Boston, Massachusetts, was a cinema and concert hall in the Back Bay, located at no.136 Massachusetts Avenue at Boylston Street.

Architect Thomas W. Lamb designed the building; its interior was "marble and velvet." The auditorium sat 1,600. In the early 1970s Aerosmith used the theatre for rehearsals. In 1972 the Berklee College of Music bought the property; the remodeled Berklee Performance Center opened in 1976 and continues today.

== Notable events and screenings ==
=== 1910s ===
- The Misleading Lady, with Edna Mayo and Henry B. Walthall
- Behind the Screen, with Charlie Chaplin
- Unprotected, with Blanche Sweet
- At the Edge of the Aqueduct, with Doris Gray
- Man of Mystery, with E. H. Sothern
- The Great Secret, with Francis X. Bushman
- Fenway Symphony Orchestra concert

=== 1920s ===
- Water Water Everywhere, with Will Rogers
- April Folly, with Marion Davies
- Ghost in the Garret, with Dorothy Gish
- The Inner Voice, with Agnes Ayres
- A Question of Honor, with Anita Stewart
- The Ruling Passion, with George Arliss
- Come on Over, with Colleen Moore
- Josephine Elbery ("the Back Bay nightingale")
- Yellow Men and Gold, with Helene Chadwick
- The Yankee Consul
- Lilac Time

=== 1960s ===
- Question 7

=== 1970s ===
- T Rex in concert
- Badfinger in concert
- [Butterfield Blues Band Reunion December 10–11 or 21-22 1971]{
