= Casey Rae =

American writer

Casey Rae is an American author, educator, and former music business executive.

== Career ==
Rae's first book, William S. Burroughs and the Cult of Rock 'n' Roll, was published by University of Texas Press in 2019. The New York Times selected the book for its summer reading list, where it topped the music category. It was reviewed in The Washington Post and on NPR.

A second nonfiction work, Dead Dharma: The Grateful Dead and the American Quest for Transcendence, is set to be published by Oxford University Press in 2026. Rae is also the author of Music Copyright: An Essential Guide for the Digital Age, published by Rowman and Littlefield. He has contributed music criticism to Dusted, Pitchfork, and Signal to Noise.

Rae served as director of music licensing for SiriusXM, the North American satellite radio service, and as CEO of the Future of Music Coalition, a national nonprofit education, research, and advocacy organization for musicians. Rae is an adjunct professor in Georgetown University's Communications, Culture, and Technology graduate program, and emeritus faculty and course author at Berklee College of Music. He has written on intellectual property and digital business models, and has testified before Congress on copyright.
