= We Wept =

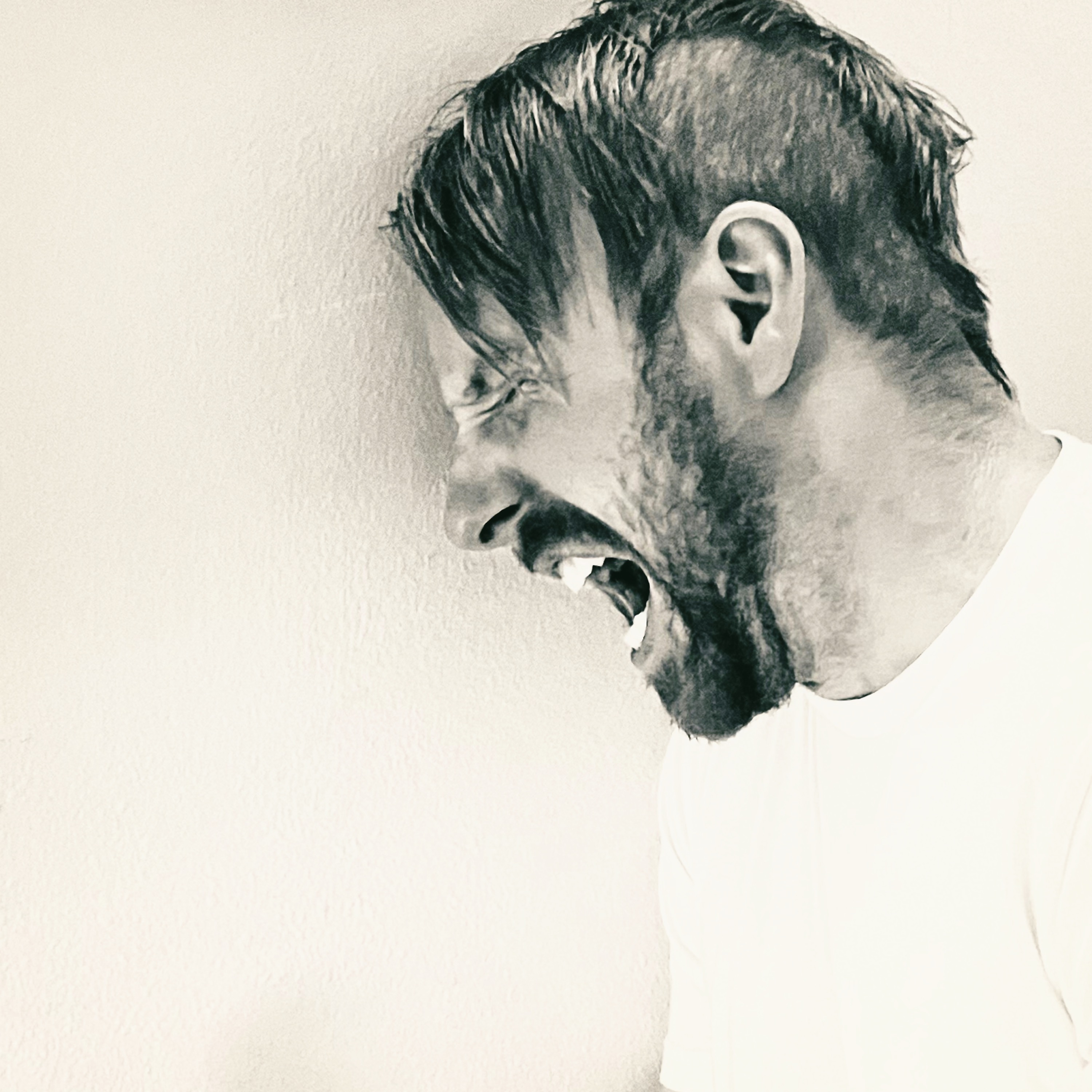

Background information
- Origin: Seattle, Washington
- Genres: rock, hard rock, alternative rock, grunge, christian metal
- Years active: 2023-present
- Publisher: Warrior Freedom Publishing
- Members: Joshua W. Turner
- Past members: John Paolilli Jr (guitar) Lawrence Lee (bass) Greg Ross (drums)

We Wept is a Seattle, Washington hard rock project led by Joshua W. Turner. Musically, the project carries the weight of 90s grunge and hard rock, with influences such as Soundgarden, Alice in Chains and Nirvana, but its deeper centre is shaped by Christian themes of hope, healing and faith.

== History ==
Turner started We Wept in 2023 with the same motivation that first led him to play music as a teenager in his bedroom: to create music he genuinely thought was cool, without any expectation of success or need for approval from others. This mindset enables him to write and record quickly, free from second-guessing or pressure to conform to any industry mold.

At the time We Wept was formed, rock music was not widely popular in the mainstream, so there was no external reward he was chasing. To his surprise, when he released the first We Wept song, “Bury Me,” he was shocked by the level of streams and interest it received. He followed it with “Not Satisfied,” which gained even more traction.

As Turner continued releasing music, each song consistently reached thousands upon thousands of streams. He realized there was a genuine audience that connected deeply with the same style of music he loved—regardless of whether it was popular in the mainstream. At the time of this publication, We Wept has accumulated over a quarter of a million streams on Spotify alone.

Momentum continued to build as radio stations began reaching out to play We Wept songs, and magazines started requesting interviews. Ironically, the success Turner had pursued over his 20 years in music came when he returned to his roots—letting go of industry expectations and focusing on creating honest, heartfelt music.

The mission of We Wept is to reach the broken and the lost, offering music as both a voice and a source of healing for the heart and soul—just as Turner needed when he was a brokenhearted 16-year-old in his bedroom.

On July 20, 2026, We Wept released their three-song EP album entitled Guardian. This collection of songs was a big departure for the band sonically incorporating instruments such as synthesizers and pianos, showing a deeper more sensitive side to their music.

== Warrior Freedom Publishing ==
In 2023, We Wept entered into a publishing agreement with Warrior Freedom Publishing. Warrior Freedom Publishing is an active music publishing company founded by Joshua W. Turner and registered with BMI (Broadcast Music, Inc.). The company holds and manages the publishing shares for all We Wept works.

== Equipment ==
Joshua W. Turner’s guitar rig for We Wept is a blend of tone, workhorse gear, and experimentation, reflecting his raw approach to songwriting and recording.

Guitars

Turner rotates between several guitars, each bringing its own tonal character to the band's sound:

- Gibson Les Paul Studio – his go-to for thick, punchy tones and sustain-driven leads.
- Fender Stratocaster – adds clarity, brightness, and dynamic expression.
- Epiphone Les Paul Custom Pro – a reliable secondary Les Paul with a slightly different edge.
- Squier Jazzmaster – used for more ambient textures and alternative tones.
- Squier Classic Vibe ‘70s Bass – handles all bass duties in recordings, delivering warm, vintage-inspired low end.

Amplifier

- Peavey Bandit 112 (Red Stripe) – Turner relies on this solid-state classic for its durability, versatility, and surprisingly rich tone. It serves as the backbone of his live and recorded guitar sound.

Pedals

Turner's pedalboard is straightforward but expressive, focused on core tones with room for unique textures:

- NUX XTC OD Distortion – provides his main overdrive and distortion tones.
- Donner Stylish Fuzz – adds grit and character for heavier or more experimental sections.
- Donner Twin Series Tap Delay – adds an atmospheric touch to his guitar tone
- Dunlop Cry Baby Wah – used for expressive leads and dynamic filtering.
- Custom Pedals by Mariner Valley Audio (Seattle) – unique, handcrafted effects that contribute to We Wept's distinctive sonic identity.

Recording Setup

All We Wept music is recorded and produced in Turner's home studio. He keeps his workflow simple and efficient, primarily using:

- Logic Pro
- GarageBand

This minimalist, DIY approach allows Turner to stay creative and productive without overthinking the process—capturing ideas quickly and staying true to the band's unfiltered sound.

Overall Sound

Turner's rig reflects his philosophy: great music doesn't require perfection—just authenticity. By combining dependable gear with creative instincts, he crafts a sound that is both powerful and deeply personal.

== Discography ==
- Bury Me - single (2024)
- Not Satisfied - single (2024)
- Gotta Lotta - single (2025)
- Desperate - single (2025)
- We Wept - EP (2025)
- Safe House - single (2026)
- Live For You - single - (2026)
- Guardian - EP (2026)
