= Lee Eliot Berk =

American college president (1942–2023)

Lee Eliot Berk (1942 – October 21, 2023) was an American academic who was president and namesake of the Berklee College of Music (founded as Schillinger House in 1945 by his father, Lawrence Berk, who renamed the school after Lee in 1954) from 1979 to 2004. Under the younger Berk's leadership, the college underwent significant changes. Berklee expanded its curriculum to create new majors, including Film Scoring, Music Production and Engineering, Music Synthesis, Songwriting, Music Business/Management, and Music Therapy. Educational applications of music technology expanded, the college administration was reorganized, more student services were added, and non-music academic offerings increased. In 1992, he established the Berklee International Network that includes music schools with a shared mission around the globe.

== Life and career ==
Lee Eliot Berk was born in 1942. He graduated from Brown University in 1964 and earned his law degree from Boston University in 1967. He began working at Berklee College of Music in 1966, serving first as bursar and supervisor of the Private Study Division. In 1969, he founded the first New England High School Stage Band Festival, later known as the Berklee High School Jazz Festival. In 2010, its 42nd year, it was the largest event of its kind in the United States. He served as a vice president from 1971 to 1979. He is the author of Legal Protection for the Creative Musician, which won an ASCAP-Deems Taylor Award in 1971.

Berk died on October 21, 2023, at the age of 81.

== Awards ==
- Upon his retirement in 2004, Berk was awarded an honorary doctorate from Berklee.
- 2004: Awarded the Order of the Rising Sun from the Emperor of Japan for his contributions to strengthening cultural ties between the U.S. and Japan.
- Received the President's Merit Award for Outstanding Educational Achievement from the National Academy of Recording Arts and Sciences
- 2004: Received the NAMM Lifetime Achievement Award from the International Music Products Industry.
- 2014: Received an honorary Doctorate of Humane Letters from Brown University.
