= Lawrence Berk =

American pianist, composer and educator

- Born: December 10, 1908; West End, Boston, U.S.
- Died: December 22, 1995 (aged 87) Brighton, Boston, U.S.
- Occupations: Musician, composer, educator
- Instrument: Piano

Lawrence Berk (December 10, 1908 – December 22, 1995) was the founder of Berklee College of Music, a pianist, composer and arranger, educator, and engineer.

Berk oversaw the growth of the modest Schillinger House music school into the Berklee College of Music, the largest independent school of music in the world. Between founding Schillinger House in 1945 and his retirement from Berklee College of Music in 1978, his entrepreneurial and music-industry savvy enabled the school's curriculum to keep place with popular music trends, developments in electronic music, and advancements in recording technology. He highly valued the practical application of classroom instruction, yet he guided the development of the curriculum to enable the school to become an accredited, degree-granting institution.

== Early life and career ==
Born and raised in Boston's West End, Berk began playing professionally as a pianist at the age of 13 in dance orchestras led by Ruby Newman, Meyer Davis, and Joe Rines. He graduated from the Massachusetts Institute of Technology with a degree in architectural engineering in 1932. With few engineering jobs available during the Great Depression, he moved to New York City, where he became a staff arranger at NBC and studied with music theorist and teacher, Joseph Schillinger. During World War II, he returned to Boston to work as a mechanical engineer at Raytheon.

== Berklee College of Music ==
After Schillinger died in 1943, Berk became one of 12 authorized teachers of the Schillinger System. He began teaching part-time on Saturdays with three students, but eventually quit his job at Raytheon to teach music full-time. In 1945, he purchased a three-story building at 284 Newbury Street and opened Schillinger House. Under his direction, enrollment in the first nine years increased tenfold, the curriculum expanded to include music education, and alumni began appearing in nationally famous orchestras such as Stan Kenton's.

In 1954, he changed the name to the Berklee School of Music, after his son, Lee Eliot Berk, to better reflect the school's broad curriculum. In the next few years, Berk added jazz musicians such as trumpeter Herb Pomeroy (1956), saxophonist Charlie Mariano (1957), drummer Alan Dawson (1957), and reed player John LaPorta (1962) to the faculty. Starting with the arrival of pianist Toshiko Akiyoshi from Japan in 1956, Berk also directed and expanded recruitment of foreign students, which in 2010 made up 24.2 percent of the student body. In 1957, he instituted an innovative LP and score series, Jazz in the Classroom, featuring recordings of big band arrangements and performances by the school's best students, packaged with copies of the arrangements. In 1962, the school established the first college-level instrumental major in guitar.

In 1966, Berklee awarded its first bachelor of music degrees and moved into larger quarters at 1140 Boylston St. Under Berk's leadership, the school offered the first college-level courses in rock and pop music and composing for commercials. In 1970, it became the Berklee College of Music and Berk bestowed the college's first honorary degree on Duke Ellington in 1971. Other curriculum firsts included an electric bass guitar major established in 1973, and a jazz-rock fusion ensemble established in 1974. His final major expansion of college facilities was the acquisition of the Berklee Performance Center and an adjoining building used for additional classroom and rehearsal facilities and the college library in 1976.

After he retired in 1978, he served as chancellor until his death in 1995. His son, Lee Eliot Berk, succeeded him as president of the college in 1979.

== Death ==
Berk died in Brighton, Boston.
