= Berklee Performance Center =

Theatre space at Berklee College of Music

Coordinates: 42°20′49.26″N 71°5′15.26″W

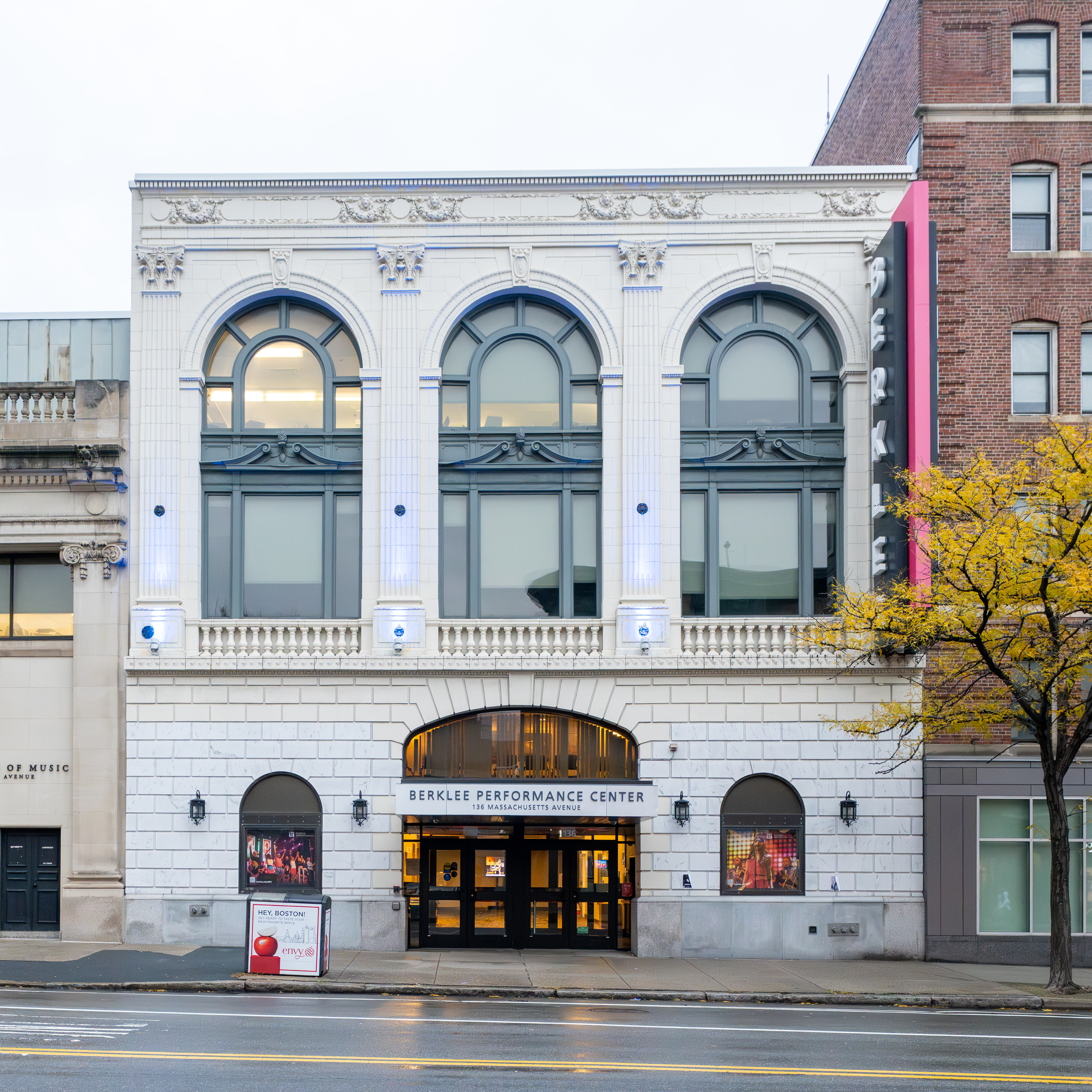
Berklee Performance Center on Massachusetts Avenue in Boston

The Berklee Performance Center is a 1,215-seat theatre located on Massachusetts Avenue in the Back Bay area of Boston, Massachusetts. It is the largest theatre space on the Berklee College of Music campus and is used primarily for college-affiliated activities. Presenters from outside the Berklee community also rent it for performances of all kinds. In 2009, the Berklee Performance Center hosted a total of 200 events.

== History ==
In 1972, Berklee purchased the Fenway Theatre at 136 Massachusetts Avenue. The 1915 movie palace, designed by Thomas Lamb, was renovated and reopened as the Berklee Performance Center in 1976.

== Venue uses ==
Berklee College of Music uses the facility to present its most popular and heavily produced student concert events, such as the Singers Showcase and the International Folk Festival. It is also the home of major faculty concerts such as Fall Together, the annual concert by the Jazz Composition Department faculty. Other Berklee-affiliated public events such as ticketed concerts during the Beantown Jazz Festival, produced by the college since 2006, and the Music Series at Berklee, which pairs professional musicians such as Issac Delgado, Don Was, and Gary Burton with student ensembles, are also presented at the Berklee Performance Center. Besides being used extensively by student performers, students enrolled in Music Production and Engineering courses use the theatre's recording studios and video taping facilities in classroom projects.

The Berklee Performance Center is also a popular rental venue for presenters of music and performances of all types. Since it opened, a wide range of artists, including Talking Heads, Thomas Dolby, Melissa Ferrick, Chick Corea, Bill Frisell, Sonny Rollins, and comedians Bill Maher and Louis C.K. have recorded there. French singer Mireille Mathieu sang here once, on 14 April 1982, during her 1982 World Tour.

For the Fall 2012 season, the headliners include Rockapella, Franco Corso, Pentatonix, Glen Hansard, Melody Gardot, Béla Fleck, Snarky Puppy, Clannad, Zoë Keating, Alfie Boe, Henry Rollins, Aimee Mann, and Mary Black.
