= Schillinger system =

Music theoretic system

The Schillinger system of musical composition, named after Joseph Schillinger (1895–1943) is a method of musical composition based on mathematical processes. It comprises theories of rhythm, harmony, melody, counterpoint, form and semantics, purporting to offer a systematic and non-genre approach to music analysis and composition; a descriptive rather than prescriptive grammar of music.

While it influenced some prominent figures, such as Lawrence Berk (founder of the Berklee College of Music) and George Gershwin (likely influencing the piece "I Got Rhythm Variations"), it began to fall out of favor in the 1960s after receiving criticisms for being over-complicated and pseudo-scientific, and was removed from the Berklee curriculum.

== Schillinger's career ==
Schillinger was a professor at The New School in New York City and taught such musicians as George Gershwin, Glenn Miller, Benny Goodman, and other Hollywood and Broadway composers.

== After Schillinger ==
Schillinger's celebrity status made him suspect, and his ideas were treated with skepticism. He died young from stomach cancer. He did not finish work on the texts he hoped would advance his theories in the realm of academe. His widow and biographer, Frances Schillinger, hired editors to complete and publish a text. They pulled together his unfinished monograph with parts of his correspondence courses. Despite its length, it presents only a partial exposition of the system. For example, Schillinger's theory of counterpoint covers only two-part counterpoint. It is marred by a wildly uneven tone, at times neutral and objective, at times vehement and polemical. His method remained difficult and obscure for the uninitiated.

His flamboyant manner based on extreme assertions is evident in his writings: "These procedures were performed crudely by even well-reputed composers. For example L. van Beethoven…"

Later, in The Theory of Melody, Beethoven is taken to task over the construction of the opening melody of his Pathétique Sonata.

== Beyond style ==
Schillinger's system of musical composition is an attempt to create a comprehensive and definitive treatise on music and number. By revealing principles of the organization of sound through scientific analysis, Schillinger hoped to free the composer from the shackles of tradition. He was clear that his methods allowed any style of composition to be undertaken more effectively.

My system does not circumscribe the composer's freedom, but merely points out the methodological way to arrive at a decision. Any decision, which results in a harmonic relation, is fully acceptable. We are opposed only to vagueness and haphazard speculation.

Schillinger rarely attempted to predict the aesthetic consequences of his system, but instead offered generalized pattern-making techniques, free of stylistic bias.

== Students ==
For all its rigor, repetition and challenge, the system was enjoyed and apparently used with great success for many years after its author's death. Schillinger's influence lingers on in the work of celebrated musicians as well as those who produced countless film scores and television theme tunes.

Schillinger had a profound effect on the world of jazz education. One of Schillinger's recognised students, Lawrence Berk, founded the Schillinger House of Music in Boston, after Schillinger's death, to continue the dissemination of the system. Schillinger House opened in 1945 and later became the Berklee College of Music where the Schillinger system survived in the curriculum until the 1960s.

In the 1940s, the Schillinger method was a focus of the curriculum at Westlake College of Music. Dick Grove, who was one of the teachers at Westlake and had studied the Schillinger system for nine years, developed some of Schillinger's ideas into his own comprehensive system of music education, which he taught at his Grove School of Music and later at the Grove School Without Walls.

Noted jazz swing composer Edgar Sampson ("Stompin' at the Savoy") was a Schillinger student in the 1940s.

Yet another admirer and former student of Schillinger's system was veteran movie composer, John Barry.

== Students ==
Students who have studied the Schillinger system include:

- Fabien Andre
- Myer Alexander
- Edwin Bave
- Victor Bay
- Richard Benda
- Larry Berk
- Eubie Blake
- William Borden
- Will Bradley
- Mike Brecker
- Randy Brecker
- Irving Brodsky
- Margaret Carlisle
- William Challis
- Norman Cloutier
- Carmine Coppola
- Clarence Cox
- Jesse Crawford
- Rosolino De Maria
- Vernon Duke
- Alfred Lewis Evans
- Belle Fenstock
- Harry Gellert
- Russell Genner
- Edwin Gerschefski
- George Gershwin
- Felix Giardina
- Benny Goodman
- Ralph Gordon
- Ross Gorman
- Jerome Gross
- Ralph Hallenbeck
- Quincy Jones
- Bernard Mayers
- John McGee
- James J. McInerney
- Albert Meiff
- Glenn Miller
- Jack Miller
- Toots Mondello
- Lee Montgomery
- Harold Mooney
- Lyn Murray
- Val Olman
- Eddie Palmieri
- Charles Paul
- Tito Puente
- Edward Powel
- Charles Previn
- Samuel Raitz
- Barry Rogers
- Alvino Rey
- Ted Royal
- Charles Hathaway
- Lennie Hayton
- Alexander Hellman
- David Galguin
- Nina Koshetz
- Paul Laval
- Leo Lefeur
- George B. Leeman
- Oscar Levant
- Gus Levens
- Joseph Lilley
- Matty Malneck
- Franklyn Marks
- Mikel Rouse
- Myron Schaeffer
- Rudolph Schramm
- Winston Sharples
- Milton Shaw
- Janis Siegel
- Harry Simeone
- Frank Skinner
- Herbert Spencer
- Paul Sterrett
- Leith Stevens
- Freddie Stulce
- Dave Torbett
- Joe Usifer
- Nathan L. Van Cleave
- Gerald F. Warburg
- Lazar Weiner
- Milton Weinstein
- William A. Welch
- Ralph Wingert
- John Winters
- Samuel Zimbalist
