= Berklee College of Music =

Private music college in Boston, Massachusetts, US

- Former names: Schillinger House; Berklee School of Music
- Motto: Esse quam videri (Latin)
- Motto in English: To be, rather than to seem
- Type: Private music college
- Established: 1945; 81 years ago
- Academic affiliations: Professional Arts Consortium
- Endowment: $465.5 million (2025)
- President: Jim Lucchese
- Faculty: 522
- Students: 8,369 (fall 2024)
- Undergraduates: 7,549 (fall 2024)
- Postgraduates: 820 (fall 2024)
- Location: Boston, Massachusetts, U.S. 42°20′47″N 71°5′13″W
- Campus: Urban
- Colors: Red and gray
- Mascot: Mingus the Jazz Cat
- Website: berklee.edu

Berklee College of Music (/ˈbɜːrkli/) is a private music college in Boston, Massachusetts. It is the largest independent college of contemporary music in the world. Known for the study of jazz and modern American music, it also offers college-level courses in a wide range of contemporary and historic styles, including rock, hip-hop, reggae, salsa, heavy metal and bluegrass.

Since 2012, Berklee College of Music has also operated a campus in Valencia, Spain. In December 2015, Berklee College of Music and the Boston Conservatory agreed to a merger. The combined institution is known as Berklee, with the conservatory becoming The Boston Conservatory at Berklee. Berklee alumni have won 310 Grammy Awards, more than any other college, and 108 Latin Grammy Awards. Other accolades for its alumni include 34 Emmy Awards, 7 Tony Awards, 8 Academy Awards, and 3 Saturn Awards.

== History ==
=== Schillinger House (1945–1954) ===
In 1945, pianist, composer, arranger and MIT graduate Lawrence Berk founded Schillinger House, the precursor to the Berklee School of Music, after quitting his job at Raytheon. Located at 284 Newbury St. in Boston's Back Bay, the school specialized in the Schillinger System of harmony and composition developed by Joseph Schillinger. Berk had studied with Schillinger. Instrumental lessons and a few classes in traditional theory, harmony, and arranging were also offered. At the time of its founding almost all music schools focused on classical music, but Schillinger House offered training in jazz and commercial music for radio, theater, television, and dancing. At first, most students were working professional musicians. Many students were former World War II service members funded through the G.I. Bill. Initial enrollment was fewer than 50 students, but by 1949 there were more than 500 students. In 1954, when the school's curriculum had expanded to include music education classes and more traditional music theory, Berk changed the name to Berklee School of Music, after his 12-year-old son Lee Eliot Berk, to reflect the broader scope of instruction.

=== Berklee School of Music (1954–1970) ===
Lawrence Berk emphasized learning from practitioners, as opposed to academics, and generally hired working musicians as faculty members. Several of the school's best-known musician-educators arrived after the school's name change. In 1956, trumpeter Herb Pomeroy joined the faculty and remained until his retirement in 1996. Drummer Alan Dawson and saxophonist Charlie Mariano became faculty members in 1957. Reed player John LaPorta began teaching in 1962. Like many of Berk's ideas, this practice continues. Although far more emphasis is placed on academic credentials among new faculty hires than in the past, experienced performers such as Gary Burton, Mick Goodrick, Pat Metheny, Arif Mardin, Aydin Esen, Hal Crook, Joe Lovano, Danilo Perez, and others have served as faculty over the years.

In 1955, its enrollment was 150-200 students. Also during the mid-1950s, the school began to attract more international students. For example, Japanese pianist Toshiko Akiyoshi arrived in 1956. Multiple Grammy-winning producer Arif Mardin came from Turkey to study at the school in 1958.

In 1957, Berklee initiated the use of technology in music education with Jazz in the Classroom, a series of LP recordings of student work, accompanied by scores. These albums contain early examples of composing, arranging, and performing by students who went on to prominent jazz careers, such as Gary Burton, John Abercrombie, John Scofield, Ernie Watts, Alan Broadbent, Sadao Watanabe, and many others. The series, which continued until 1980, was a precursor to subsequent Berklee-affiliated recording labels. These later releases provided learning experiences not only for student composers and performers, but also for students in the new majors in music engineering and production, and music business and management.

Berklee awarded its first bachelor of music degrees in 1966. Members of the first graduating class to receive degrees included Alf Clausen, Stephen Gould and Michael Rendish. Gould taught film scoring at Berklee and became the program director for the Educational Leadership PhD program at Lesley University. During the 1960s, the Berklee curriculum began to reflect new developments in popular music, such the rise of rock and roll, soul and funk, and jazz-rock fusion. In 1962, Berklee offered the first college-level instrumental major for guitar. The guitar department began with nine students, and developed into the largest instrumental major at the college. Guitarist Jack Petersen accepted an invitation by Berk to design and chair the first formal guitar curriculum. Berk discovered Petersen through his affiliation with the Stan Kenton Band Clinics. Trombonist Phil Wilson joined the faculty in 1965. His student ensemble, the Dues Band, helped introduce contemporary popular music into the ensemble curriculum, and later as the Rainbow Band, performed world music and jazz fusions. In 1969, courses in rock and popular music were added to the curriculum, the first to be offered at the college level. The first college course on jingle writing was also offered in 1969. Between 1968 and 1969, enrollment of women "jumped from 11 to 44," and by 1970 total enrollment had reached 1000, with 80 of them being international students.

=== Berklee College of Music (1970–2016) ===
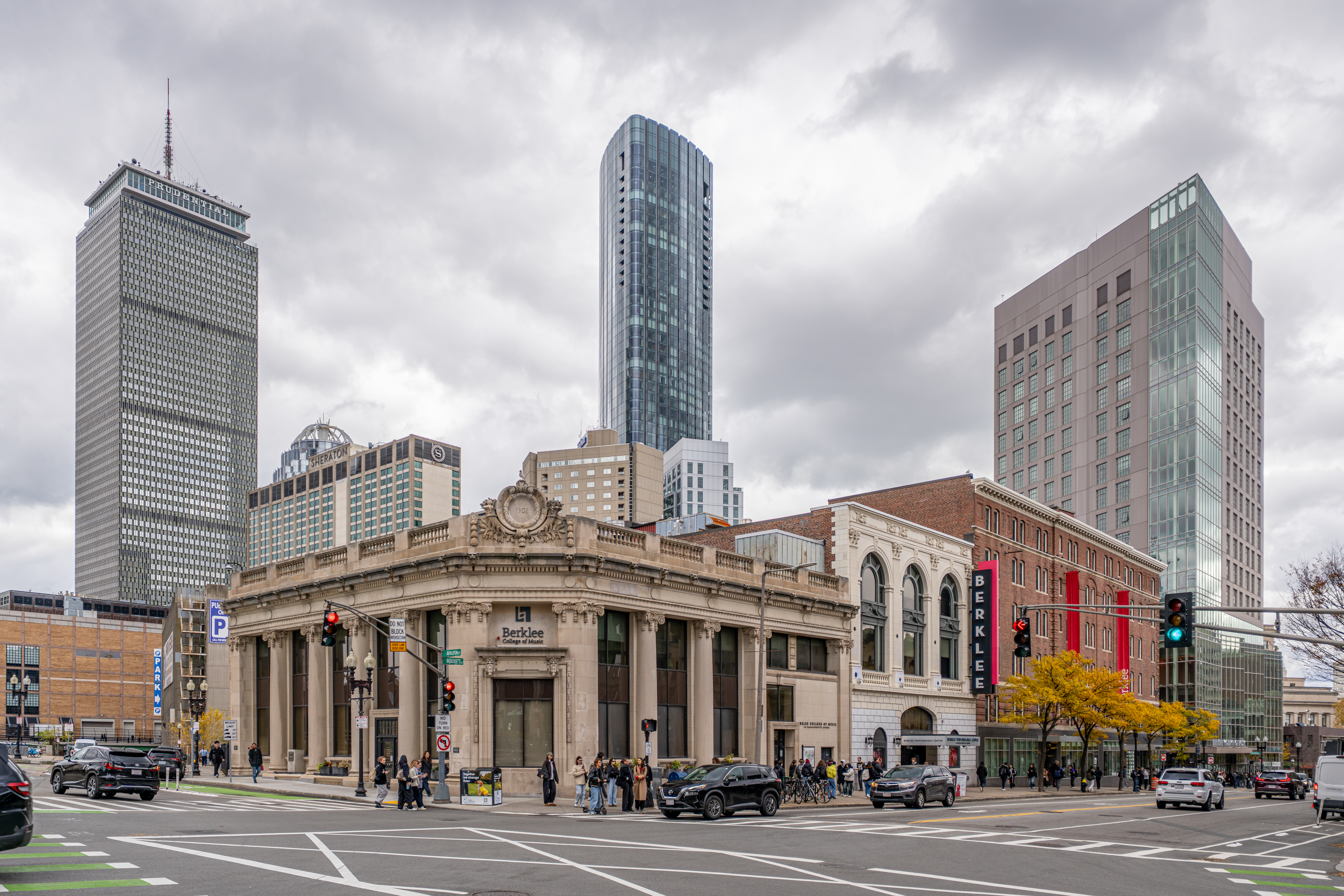
College Buildings along Massachusetts Avenue in Boston, including the Berklee Performance Center, 130 Massachusetts Avenue, and the 160 Massachusetts Avenue tower.

The school became Berklee College of Music in 1970 and bestowed its first honorary doctorate on Duke Ellington in 1971. Vibraphonist Gary Burton joined the faculty in 1971, helping to solidify the place of jazz-rock fusion in the curriculum. As Dean of Curriculum from 1985 to 1996, Burton led the development of several new majors, including music synthesis and songwriting, and facilitated the school's transition to technology-based education. Curriculum innovations during the 1970s included the first college-level instrumental major in electric bass guitar in 1973, and the first jazz-rock ensemble class in 1974.

In 1979, Berklee founder Lawrence Berk stepped down as president. The board of trustees appointed his son Lee Eliot Berk to replace him. Under new leadership, the school underwent further growth and diversification of its curriculum. The college offered the world's first undergraduate degree program in film scoring starting in 1980. Beginning in 1981, the string department curriculum expanded to include many stylistic idioms besides classical music. In 1986, the world's first college-level major in music synthesis was offered, followed by the world's first college songwriting major in 1987. Instrumental majors also expanded to include the first college hand-percussion major in 1988. The college was also the first third-level institution in the world to offer a course in Electric Bass Guitar. While many conservatories offer a major in Double Bass, Berklee's former bass chair Rich Appleman was a pioneer in bass education and understood the impact this change could bring.

The number of international students has grown steadily to 24.2% of total enrollment in 2010 and 28% as of the 2012–2013 academic year.

Berklee expanded its community outreach efforts in 1991 with the launch of City Music, a program designed to make music instruction available to underserved youth in the Boston area. On a global scale, Berklee partnered with selected music schools around the world to form the Berklee International Network in 1993. Other new majors, in Music Business & Management and music therapy, were offered beginning in 1994 and 1996 respectively. In 2003, the school began offering classes online through Berkleemusic.com, called Berklee Online under the leadership of Dave Kusek. Other curriculum developments included the incorporation of a hip-hop course in 2004.

In 2004, Lee Eliot Berk stepped down as president of the school his father had founded, and Roger H. Brown was installed as the college's third president. Under Brown's leadership the college's enrollment has grown and diversified, admission has become highly selective, and significant increases have occurred in the retention (above 80% in 2016) and graduation rate (above 60% in 2015). In 2006, mandolin and banjo were accepted as principal instruments for the first time. The college also initiated an Africana Studies program, the Berklee Global Jazz Institute, and an American Roots Music Program. In October 2013, Berklee Online launched its online degree programs, and began accepting applications for the Bachelor of Professional Studies in two majors: music production, and music business. In January 2014, the college launched the Berklee Institute for Creative Entrepreneurship (Berklee ICE), a new campus center which offers courses, workshops, research and an incubation environment to encourage music businesses startup companies.

=== Berklee (2016–present) ===
In June 2015, Berklee College of Music and The Boston Conservatory announced that the governing boards for the two schools had approved plans to pursue a proposed merger. On January 19, 2016, the two schools announced that they would be merging. The agreement was signed the next day, with Berklee College of Music being renamed Berklee, and the Conservatory being renamed The Boston Conservatory at Berklee.

On October 22, 2020, Berklee announced its new president-elect, Erica Muhl, as President Brown announced his retirement. Muhl previously worked at the University of Southern California (USC), where she was dean and founding executive director of the Jimmy Iovine and Andre Young Academy for Arts, Technology and the Business of Innovation.

For the fall semester of 2020, the college taught classes remotely as a result of the COVID-19 pandemic. The college then moved to a hybrid model learning system in the spring semester of 2021.

In August 2021, Berklee College of Music announced it would begin offering a Bachelor of Arts program in Music Industry Leadership and Innovation starting in the fall of 2022. The program will be the first undergraduate Bachelor of Arts degree to be available in the college's history.

In 2025, Berklee College of Music, alongside Ben Zakharenko and Dayvin, were announced as one of the remixers for the 2026 FIFA World Cup theme, representing the Boston area.

=== List of college presidents ===
No.	Presidents	Term of office
Founder	Lawrence Berk	1945–1979
2	Lee Eliot Berk	1979–2004
3	Roger H. Brown	2004–2021
4	Erica Muhl	2021–2023
-	David Bogen	2023–2024 (interim)
5	Jim Lucchese	2025–

==== Sexual harassment allegations ====
In November 2017, The Boston Globe reported a culture of sexual harassment existed on the campus, with at least 3 male professors allowed to quietly leave the school in 2008 after student reports of sexual misconduct with teachers. Berklee's administrators released a statement saying, in part, that the college has rigorous policies and procedures in place to deal with claims of sexual harassment. On November 13, students staged a silent protest and class walkout to address the allegations of sexual harassment by teachers and staff. Also on November 13, college president Roger Brown addressed over 1,200 students, apologized to the affected students, and pledged to "root out abusive behavior." He also stated that the school has terminated eleven faculty members in the past thirteen years due to sexual harassment and sexual assault. The college has worked to strengthen policies to prevent sexual harassment and abuse and has taken a number of measures to create a better and safer environment, including instituting "training courses, creating a working group, and diversifying leadership."

== Academics ==
Berklee College of Music is accredited by the New England Commission of Higher Education (NECHE). The college stated that it was the first to offer online undergraduate degrees in 2002, and introduced graduate degrees in 2018, starting with programs in music production and music business.

== Admission ==
Berklee's admission process focuses primarily on an audition, an interview, and on the applicant's academic record.

For the 2017–2018 school year, the acceptance rate for the Berklee College of Music Boston was 33.8%, for the Boston Conservatory it was 38%, and for Berklee Online it was 66%.

From 2014 to 2017, Berklee reported acceptance rates ranging from 28 to 36%. As of fall 2018, Admissions updated its applications reporting to count only paid applications. Previous years' totals includes all partial applications, regardless of status or payment.

Berklee offers three different terms for entering full-time students: the traditional fall semester, spring, and summer. Unlike other colleges, entering students may choose their own entering semester. Typically, the deadlines are November 1 (early action) and January 15 (regular action) for fall semester, July 1 for spring semester, and December 1 for summer semester.

As part of the application to the college, applicants are required to complete a live audition and interview. An integral part of selecting the entering class is the audition and interview experience, designed to show applicants' strengths while helping the school to assess applicants' talent and potential to succeed in Berklee's dynamic environment. Although there is a general format for the audition and interview, each experience is unique. Berklee considers all applicants for both admission and scholarship through the audition and interview process. Starting in 2014, the college will audition some applicants online using high speed internet technology.

== Demographics ==
As of the 2021–2022 academic year, total enrollment at Berklee was 7,943 (7,177 undergraduates and 766 graduates). Among undergraduate students, 42% were female and 58% were male. Among graduate students, 46% were female and 54% were male. 73 students out of the total 7,943 identified as transgender or gender diverse. Students from 97 countries outside the U.S. accounted for approximately 25% of the student population. China, Canada, India, Brazil, and Colombia were the top five countries of origin. In addition to students attending the Berklee campus in Boston, in the 2021–2022 academic year, 1,895 students took online courses through Berklee Online.

== Facilities ==
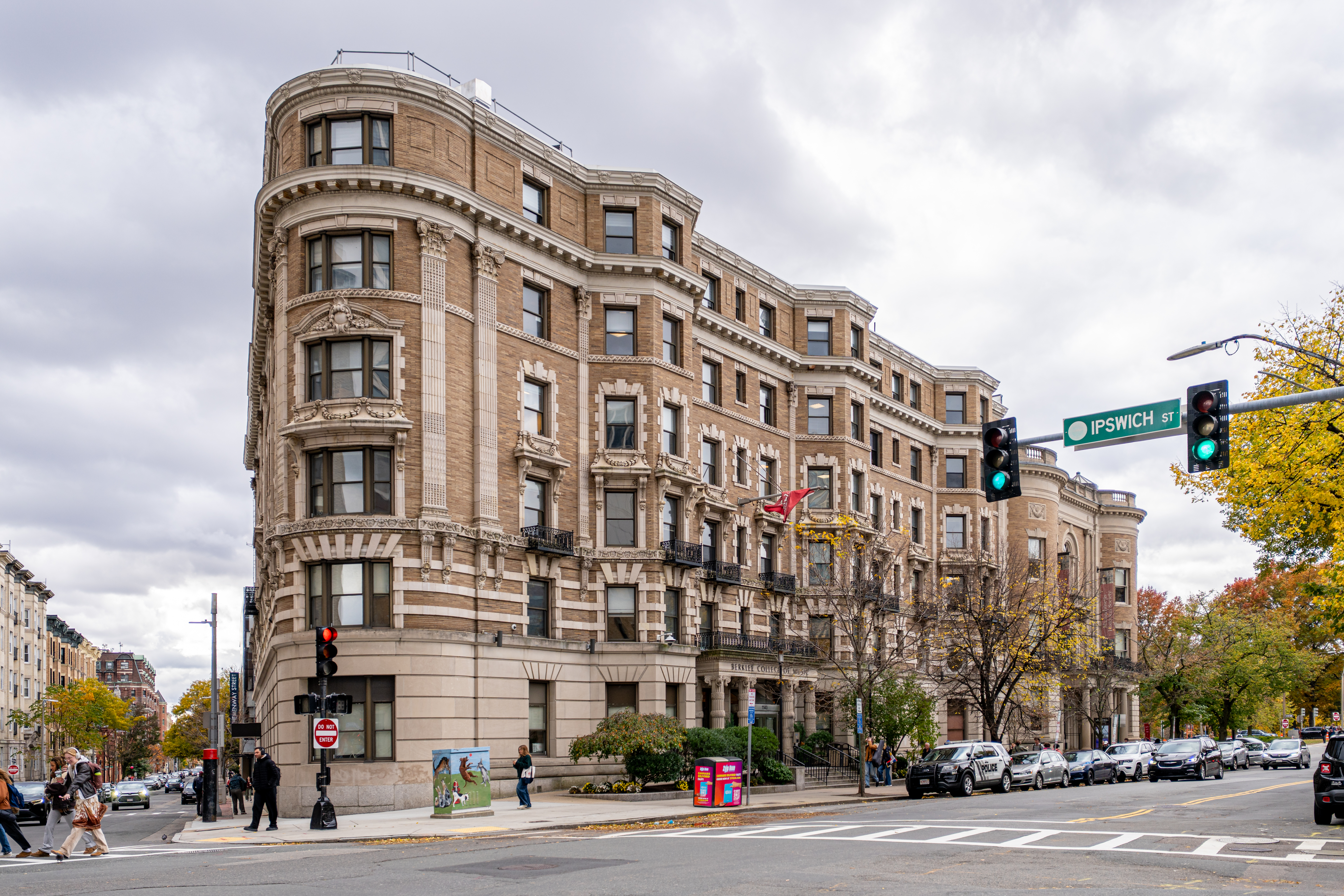
1140 Boylston St.

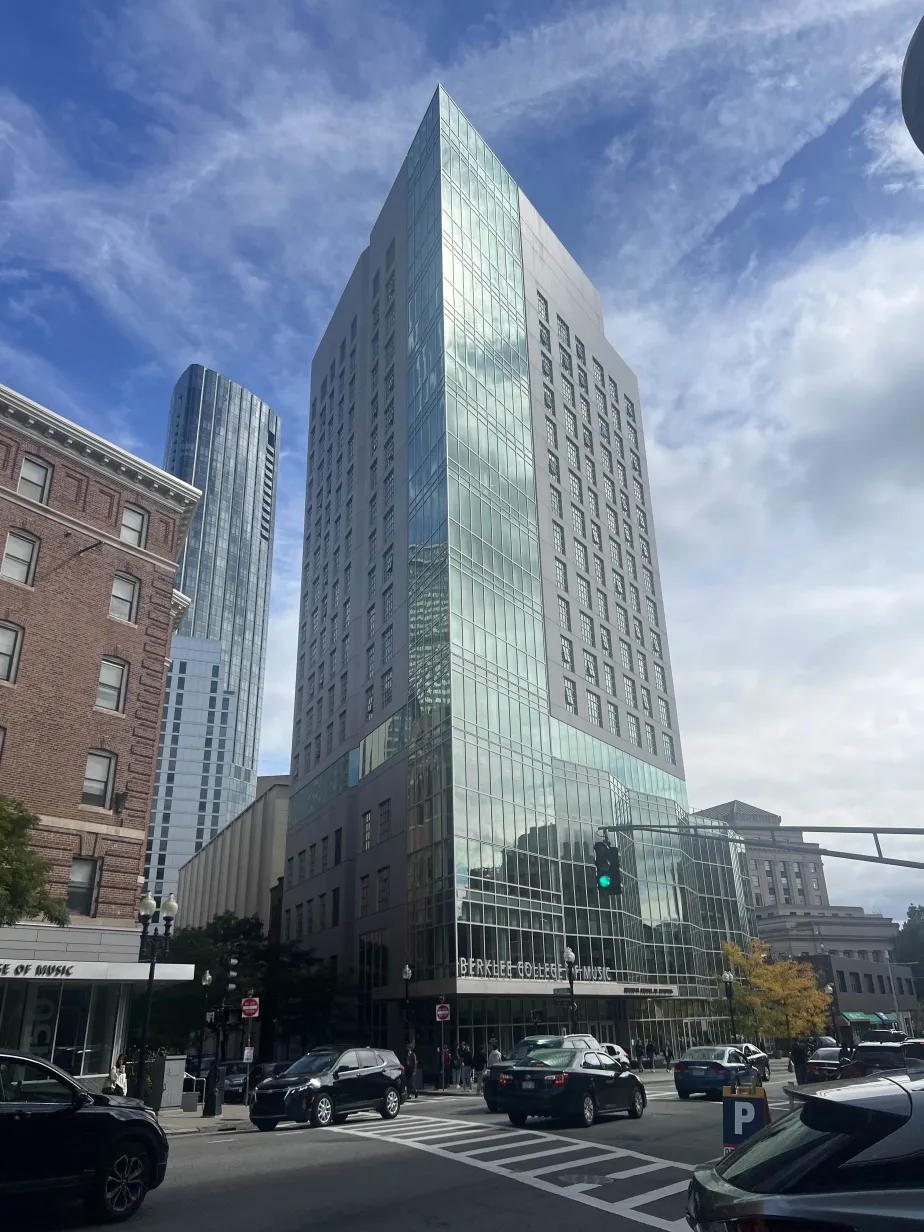
Berklee Tower on 160 Massachusetts Avenue

Berklee remained at its original location at 284 Newbury Street from its founding in 1945 to 1966, when it moved into the larger 1140 Boylston Street building, the former Hotel Bostonian. Beginning in 1972 an era of more rapid expansion began with the purchase of the Fenway Theatre and the adjoining Sherry Biltmore Hotel at 150 Massachusetts Avenue. The theater was renovated and opened as the 1,227-seat Berklee Performance Center in 1976. The former Biltmore Hotel provided additional classroom and practice room spaces and residence halls. It also houses the library, which was renamed the Stan Getz Library and Media Center in 1998. The 150 Massachusetts Avenue building is also the site of the Berklee Learning Center, which when it opened in 1993, was the world's largest networked computer learning facility for music education.

The Genko Uchida Center at 921 Boylston Street opened in 1997 and houses the offices for enrollment, admissions, scholarships and student employment, the registrar, financial aid, bursar, rehearsal and classroom space, and the 200-seat David Friend Recital Hall. At 939 Boylston Street, Café 939, the nation's only student-run, all-ages night club, hosts a full program of student performers, local and national acts, and community programs.

As of 2014, Berklee occupied 25 buildings primarily in the Back Bay area of Boston, near the intersection of Boylston Street and Massachusetts Avenue. Within these buildings were 40 recording studios, 5 film/video scoring and editing facilities, and 9 music synthesis facilities. The studios of the five-channel, commercial-free Berklee Internet Radio Network (BIRN), which launched in 2007, were also housed on campus. A new Liberal Arts building at 7 Haviland Street was dedicated in 2010. It houses the Liberal Arts, Music Therapy, and Music Business Departments, as well as the Africana Studies program.

In early 2011, Berklee College of Music announced its plan of constructing 3 new buildings along Massachusetts Avenue. The first building, a 16-story mixed-use building at 160 Massachusetts Avenue that include 370 dorm rooms, a two-story cafeteria, a performance center, 14,000 square feet (1,300 m^{2}) of recording studios, and retail space, opened in February 2014. The Boston Globe architecture critic Robert Campbell described it "as (a) very good building". The building received the American Institute of Architects' 2015 Housing Award, being named one of the best 10 residential projects of the previous year. The second building is planned to be built on top of the existing 130–136 Massachusetts Avenue (The Berklee Performance Centre). The new building is expected to house additional 450 students, as well as a performing center, in its 24-story tall structure. The third building is planned to be at 161–171 Massachusetts Avenue, which is expected to contain more academic and administrative space for the Berklee College of Music.

== Berklee València ==
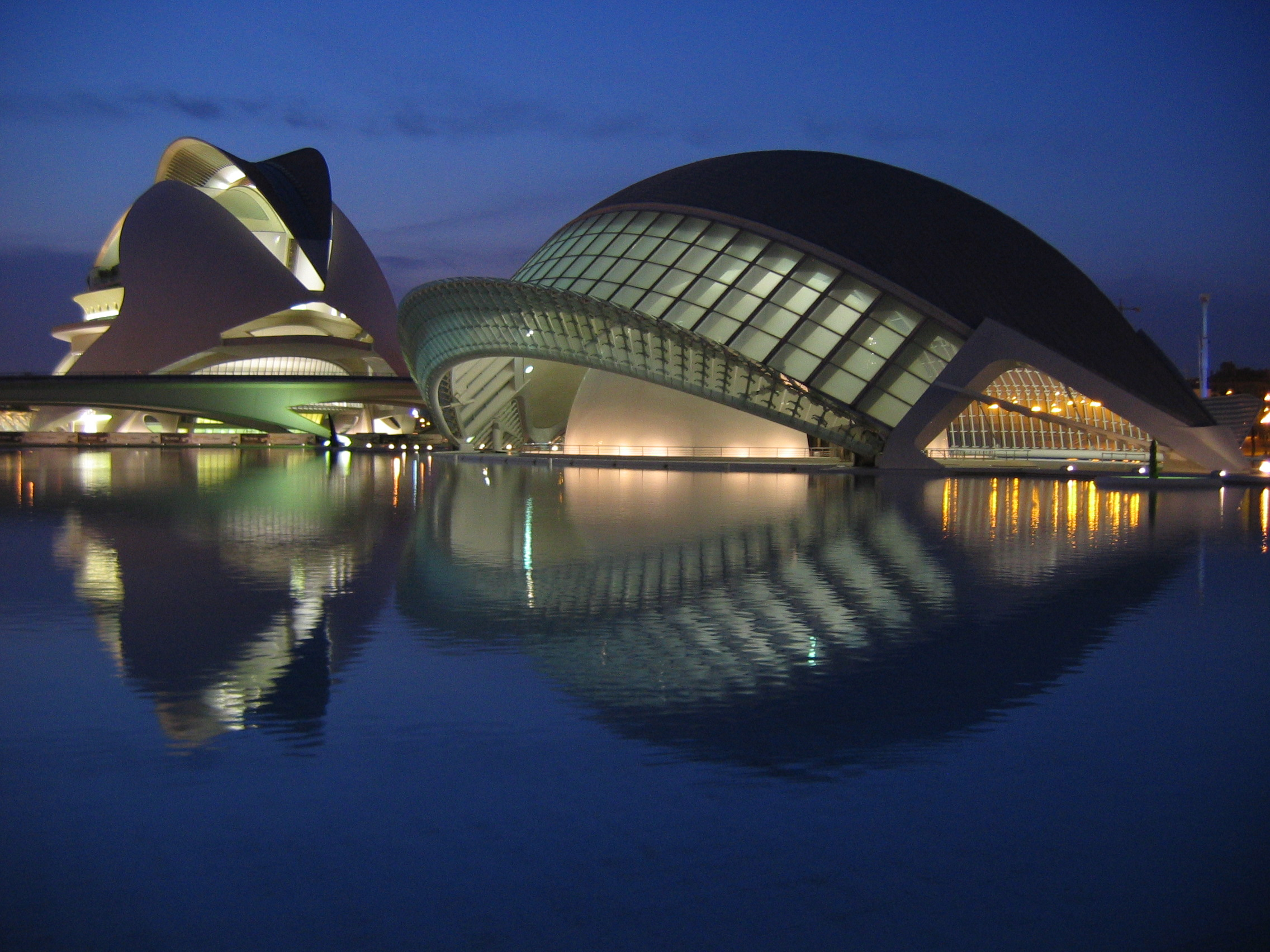
Palau de les Arts Reina Sofía (background building) in València, Spain, houses Berklee València

Berklee València, the college's first international campus, is housed in the Palau de les Arts Reina Sofía, the final structure built as part of a grand City of Arts and Sciences concept designed by architect Santiago Calatrava.

=== Special programs and professional certificates ===
Berklee's campus in València regularly offers unique programs in contemporary music. These include clinics, workshops, and seminars as well as short, concentrated sessions in areas such as performance, flamenco, film scoring, music business, technology and production, and education.

It also offers a two-week summer performance program in addition to the five-week program in Boston.

== Berklee NYC ==
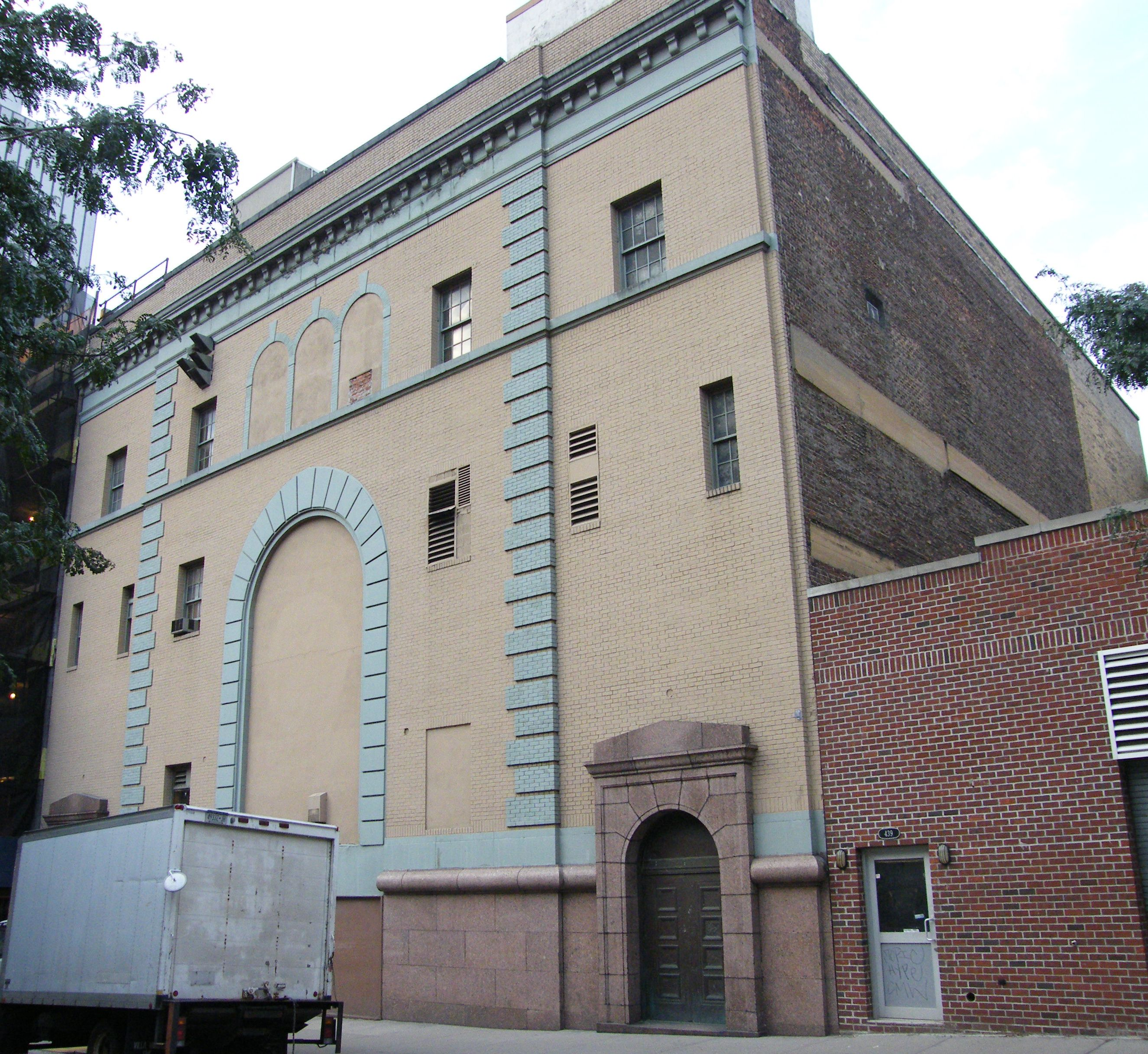
Power Station at BerkleeNYC

Berklee NYC is the college's campus in New York. Housed in the Power Station studios in Hell's Kitchen, it offers a one-year, three-semester, Master of Arts in Creative Technology.

== Boston Conservatory at Berklee ==
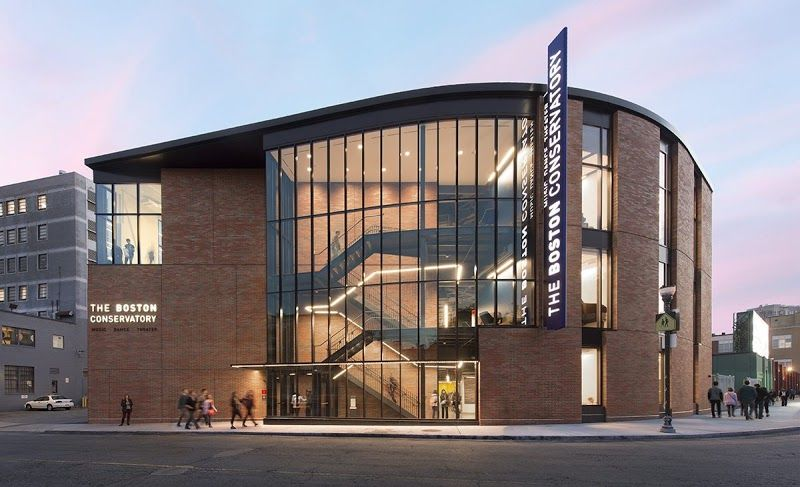
Boston Conservatory at Berklee

On January 19, 2016, the Berklee and Boston Conservatory announced that they would merge under an institutional umbrella called Berklee, consisting of Boston Conservatory at Berklee, Berklee College of Music, Berklee Online, and Berklee Valencia.

== Berklee Online ==
Berklee Online is the online extension school of Berklee College of Music. The school delivers access to Berklee's curriculum to students around the world.

Berklee Online's online music courses, multi-course certificate programs, and Bachelor of Professional Studies online degree programs are accredited and taught by the college's faculty and industry professionals. The school also provides free Berklee online music resources through Berklee Shares, massive open online courses (MOOCs) including Coursera, EdX, and Kadenze.

From 2005 to 2012, the University Professional Continuing Education Association (UPCEA) awarded Berklee Online with its Best Online College Course Award. Since its inception, Berklee Online has taught more than 30,000 students from 144 countries.

Former Berklee Online students include members of Nine Inch Nails, Dave Matthews Band (Stefan Lessard), Karmin (Amy Heidemann), Sugarland (Annie Clements, Brandon Bush, Thad Beatty), and Train.

=== Online degree programs ===
In October 2013, the online school began accepting applications for its 120-credit online degree in two majors: Bachelor of Professional Studies in Music Production and Bachelor of Professional Studies in Music Business. In November 2014, Berklee Online added three new degree majors to its Bachelor of Professional Studies program: Electronic Music Production and Sound Design, Music Composition for Film, TV, and Games, and Interdisciplinary Music Studies, a major that allows students to build their own program based on their musical interests and goals. Since then, the college has continued to expand its online bachelor's degree major offerings, adding Guitar, Songwriting, and Songwriting and Producing Music to the roster. The college is reportedly the first nonprofit music institution to offer regionally accredited bachelor's degrees online.

== Scholarly publications ==
Since 2005, Berklee has published the Music Business Journal, which publishes articles on the music industry.

== See also ==
- Real Book
