= Joseph Schillinger =

American classical composer (1895–1943)

Joseph Moiseyevich Schillinger
- Ио́сиф Моисе́евич Ши́ллингер
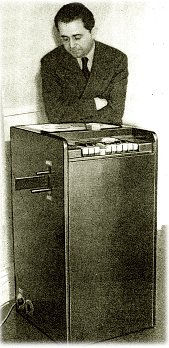
- Joseph Schillinger and the Rhythmicon
- Born: 1 September [O.S. 20 August] 1895 (other sources: 31 August [O.S. 19 August] 1895); Kharkov, Kharkov Governorate, Russian Empire (now Ukraine)
- Died: 23 March 1943 (aged 47); New York City
- Other name: Frank Lynn (pseudonym)
- Occupations: Composer, music theorist, composition teacher

Joseph Moiseyevich Schillinger (Russian: Ио́сиф Моисе́евич Ши́ллингер; 1 September [O.S. 20 August] 1895 (other sources: 31 August [O.S. 19 August] 1895) – 23 March 1943) was a composer, music theorist, and composition teacher who originated the Schillinger System of Musical Composition. He was born in Kharkov, in the Kharkov Governorate of the Russian Empire (present-day Kharkiv, Ukraine) and died in New York City. He sometimes used the pseudonym "Frank Lynn".

== Life and career ==
The unprecedented migration of European knowledge and culture that swept from East to West during the first decades of the 20th century included figures such as Sergei Prokofiev and Sergei Rachmaninoff, composers who were the product of the Russian system of music education. Schillinger came from this background, dedicated to creating professional musicians, having been a student at the St Petersburg Imperial Conservatory of Music. He communicated his musical knowledge in the form of a written theory, using mathematical expressions to describe art, architecture, design and music.

In New York, Schillinger flourished, becoming famous as an advisor to many leading American musicians and concert music composers, including George Gershwin, Earle Brown, Benny Goodman, Glenn Miller, Oscar Levant, Tommy Dorsey, Henry Cowell, and Quincy Jones.

Gershwin spent four years (1932–36) studying with Schillinger. During this period, he wrote Porgy and Bess and consulted Schillinger on it, particularly the orchestration. There has been some disagreement about the nature of Schillinger's influence on Gershwin. After the posthumous success of Porgy and Bess, Schillinger claimed he had a large and direct influence in overseeing its creation; Ira Gershwin completely denied that his brother had any such assistance for the work. A third account of Gershwin's musical relationship with Schillinger was written by Gershwin's close friend Vernon Duke, also a Schillinger student, in an article for The Musical Quarterly in 1947. Some of Gershwin's notebooks from his studies with Schillinger are at the Library of Congress.

In the field of electronic music, Schillinger collaborated with Léon Theremin, the inventor of the theremin. Schillinger wrote his First Airphonic Suite for Theremin, who played the instrument at the premiere in 1929 with the Cleveland Orchestra, conducted by Nikolai Sokoloff.

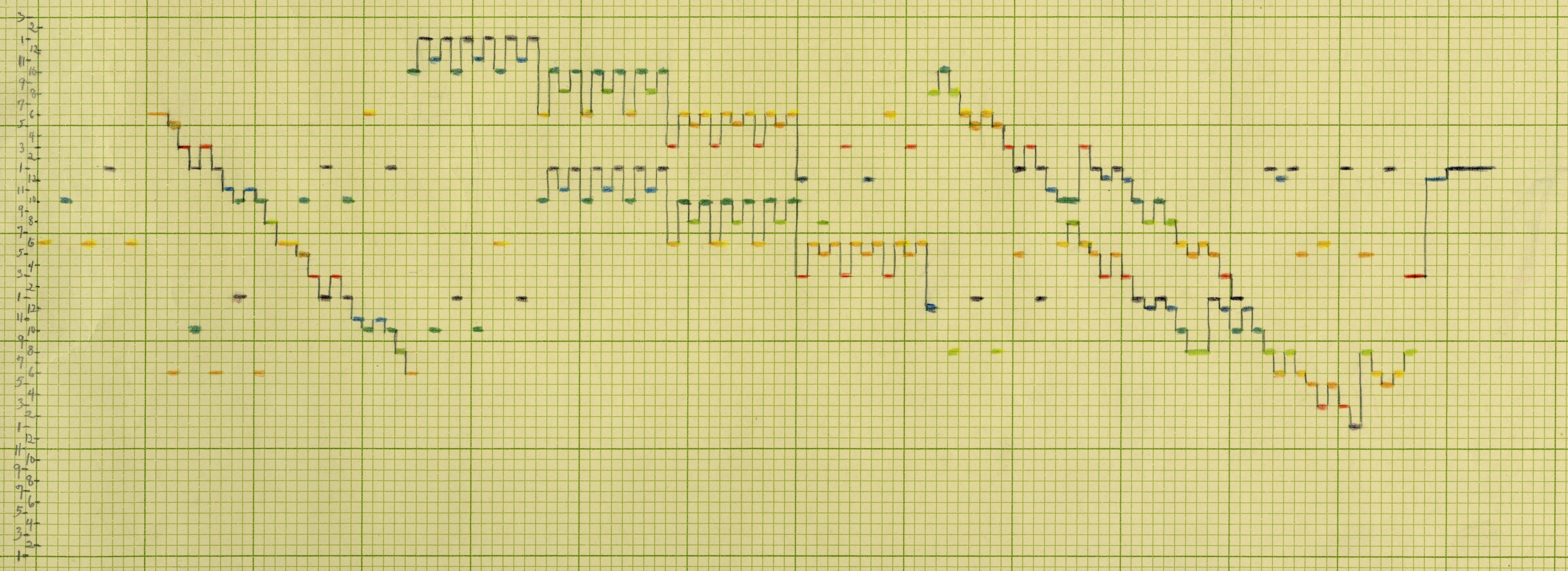
Chart by Joseph Schillinger graphing Johann Sebastian Bach's Invention no. 8 in F Major, BWV 779

Schillinger applied his mathematical principles to various fields, as he believed that the same underlying mathematics governed all forms of art. His 658-page work The Mathematical Basis of the Arts (1943) lays out his ideas in extended detail. Schillinger also collaborated with the filmmaker Mary Ellen Bute, and published a new method of dance notation.

Schillinger taught at a number of institutions, including The New School, but his greatest success was his postal tuition courses, which later became The Schillinger System of Musical Composition, published posthumously by Lyle Dowling and Arnold Shaw.

Schillinger accredited a small group of students as qualified teachers of his system, and after his death, one of them, Lawrence Berk, founded a music school in Boston to continue its dissemination. Schillinger House opened in 1945 and later became the Berklee College of Music, where the system survived in the curriculum until the early 1970s.

There has been debate about how many teachers Schillinger certified. The numbers cited range from seven to twelve. To date, only seven certified teachers of the Schillinger System have been substantiated. Three certified teachers were Asher Zlotnik of Baltimore, Maryland (a student and personal friend of Dowling), Edwin Gerschefski, and Roland Wiggins.
