= Bing Crosby Entertains =

American radio show

- Other names: The Makers of Woodbury Facial Soap Present Bing Crosby
- Genre: Music
- Running time: 30 minutes
- Country of origin: United States
- Language(s): English
- Home station: KHJ
- Syndicates: CBS
- Starring: Bing Crosby; The Boswell Sisters; The Mills Brothers
- Announcer: Ken Niles
- Written by: Claude Binyon; Ralph Huston
- Produced by: Burt McMurtrie
- Recording studio: Hollywood, USA
- Original release: October 16, 1933 – June 11, 1935
- No. of series: 2
- No. of episodes: 72
- Opening theme: "Where the Blue of the Night (Meets the Gold of the Day)"
- Sponsored by: Woodbury Soap Company

Bing Crosby Entertains is a weekly radio show which ran for two seasons during 1933–1935, and was to cement Bing Crosby's reputation as a radio star. Bing Crosby Entertains was Crosby's most important radio series to date, and it enabled him to fully develop as a rounded radio personality instead of a singer who did not speak.

== Background ==
Bing Crosby's radio career had taken off with his nightly nation-wide broadcasts from New York in 1931-32 and he moved on to the two nights a week Music That Satisfies show which ran for 13 weeks early in 1933. The nightly shows required him to do separate shows for the East Coast and for the West Coast because of the time difference. That was avoided for the Music That Satisfies series as Crosby broadcast at 9:15 p.m. Eastern which meant that it was heard at 6:15 p.m. in California. By this time, Crosby was making three films a year and undertaking stage appearances. A once-a-week radio show which did not have to be repeated for the West Coast was ideal for him and Woodbury Soap agreed to sponsor such a show on the CBS network.

== Season 1 ==
The show made its bow on Monday, October 16, 1933, at 5:30 p.m. Pacific Time. Musical support came from Lennie Hayton’s orchestra and Ken Niles was the announcer. The guest was eighteen-year-old songstress, Mary Lou Raymond. Bing was paid $1,750 per broadcast for a minimum of 13 weeks plus a figure to be agreed for a further six broadcasts.

The shows opened with Ken Niles saying: “Bing Crosby entertains” followed by a word of welcome from Crosby and an opening song. “After that Niles would deliver a message from Woodbury whose slogan: “For the skin you love to touch,” represented considerable aesthetic improvement for Crosby over coughless cigarettes and saliva-free cigars.” The Woodbury program is significant for it gave Crosby some dialogue for the first time, his personality emerging in light banter with Niles and introductions to his songs. It also began the system of cross-promoting his own work as he featured songs and guest stars from his own films and sang songs he had recorded.

Billboard liked the opening show saying, among other things: “Selling a product to the women must of necessity use a program of definite appeal to them and in Crosby, Woodbury Soap has chosen wisely. For Bing is in the middle of a brilliant career and the motion picture successes in which he appears add to his strength as a radio draw. Further, he has not been heard too often of late and his performance is better than ever as to both voice and choice of selections.”

There was a dispute between Crosby and the sponsor over what theme tune should be used. Woodbury Soap and its agency, Lennon & Mitchell, considered that the tune ‘Loveliness’ which had always been the theme of the Woodbury programs should continue. Crosby argued that the logical theme for the stanza was "Where the Blue of the Night (Meets the Gold of the Day)", on the grounds that the song had been identified with him ever since he had been on the air. Eventually Woodbury conceded to the singer. Other problems arose with Dale Winbrow, who had been sent out to the West coast from New York by the Lennon & Mitchell agency to resolve the theme tune argument and supervise the show. Winbrow listened to the program that Crosby and Lennie Hayton had prepared for the next broadcast and was very critical of it. “The flare up that was provoked from Crosby wound up with the warbler and Hayton declaring themselves out of the show. The baritone’s management later prevailed upon him to hold on while the situation was being straightened out with the agency on the New York end.”

Major guest stars during the series were the Mills Brothers (15 appearances) and Kay Thompson & the Three Rhythm Kings (10 times). Carole Lombard guested on the show on April 2, 1934, to promote the Crosby-Lombard film We're Not Dressing.

The show had a 25.1 rating for the season putting it in 14th. position for evening programs. The highest rated evening program as assessed by the Co-operative Analysis of Broadcasting for the 1933–34 season was the Eddie Cantor show (with a Crossley rating of 50.2) with Rudy Vallée coming in at 39.0.

After the January 8, 1934 show, Lennie Hayton handed over the orchestral support for a few weeks to Gus Arnheim and his Orchestra. In turn, Carol Lofner's Beverly Wilshire Orchestra took over from Arnheim after the February 26 show and then Jimmy Grier assumed the role on March 26 until the end of the season.

In March 1934, Crosby agreed a further seven weeks’ contract with Woodbury at $2,500 per broadcast. He had been offered $3,000 by Studebaker but this was for a minimum of 13 weeks which did not suit the singer as he wanted to be free for a tour of personal appearances immediately on the expiration of his Paramount Pictures contract at the end of May 1934. It had been Studebaker's intention to step into the Monday night niche held by Woodbury on CBS and if Crosby had not renewed, Woodbury would have ended the show's run with the April 9 broadcast. No guest stars appeared after the April 9 broadcast.

The final show of the season was on May 28, 1934.

== Season 2 ==
The Woodbury show returned to the air on CBS on September 18, 1934, at 5 p.m. Pacific Time. Now on Tuesdays, this time Crosby was paid $6,000 a week to deliver a complete package. He paid for the guests, the orchestra and the arrangements and retained what was left for himself. Georgie Stoll led the orchestra as Jimmy Grier had been signed exclusively by another program. The Boswell Sisters were guests on the opening show having been signed on a thirteen-week contract. Claude Binyon wrote the scripts and Ken Niles continued as the announcer. Crosby promoted his hit record of Love in Bloom on the opening program. The audience share during the season was 15.5.

Variety welcomed the opening show. “Two types of delivery, both the finest in their line and a first rate orchestra to round it out. This one sounded sure-fire on paper and lives up to all expectations on the air. Crosby is Crosby and calls for no comment…The Boswells are more torrid than ever in their close harmony….Woodbury here, has a Tuesday evening show that’s bound to be tuned in on.”

Major guest stars during the series were the Boswell Sisters (13 appearances) and the Mills Brothers (12 times). Kitty Carlisle appeared on the November 27 show to help promote the film Here Is My Heart and Joan Bennett was on the February 12, 1935 program to advertise the Crosby-Bennett movie Mississippi. Ginger Rogers was another notable guest during the series.

On the November 13 show and for the next six programs, after the opening theme, the orchestra launched into ‘Boola Boola’ and the listener was transported to the ivy-covered walls of ‘Woodbury Prep’. Ken Niles was president of the student body and Bing, the venerable Dean. The Boswell Sisters were students. It is worth explaining that ‘Prep’ was not an abbreviation for ‘Preparatory’ but ‘is short for preparation and Woodbury’s is the finest preparation of its type on the market’. It is possible that the later ‘Kraft Music Hall University’ routine, attributed to Carroll Carroll, had its beginnings here.

At the beginning of the November 20 show, Bing announced, in an extremely hoarse voice, that he would not be able to sing as a result of attending the football game between Santa Clara and St. Mary's of Moraga at Kezar Stadium in San Francisco at the weekend. It had rained throughout the game and Bing had done a lot of shouting in support and lost his voice. The Boswell Sisters and the Georgie Stoll orchestra had to carry the program.

History was made on the December 25, 1934 show when Crosby sang “Silent Night” which was quite a departure for a popular singer then and Crosby was uneasy about singing it. The show's finale had a short play, set on a college campus. Crosby was supposed to be a professor bidding the students good-bye for the holidays. The singer was portrayed as having no home of his own to go to and he would have to face Christmas alone. After a brief sequence of events, during which Crosby cheered up another lonely soul, “Silent Night” is heard being sung outside his quarters as the students have come back to serenade him. Crosby opened the door and joined in, singing a solo as the show ended. Thousands of enthusiastic letters were received and “Silent Night” became part of Crosby's Christmas show for the next quarter of a century. The show's producer, Burt McMurtrie, recalled the occasion when speaking in 1979. “Bing sang “Silent Night” there for the first time. All by himself. He sang it like nobody—I mean, nobody, had ever sung it before. And all of us watching him stood stone still. It was unbelievable. So moving. Bing shouldn't have worried about it. Everything went off so beautifully, and even before we went off the air, the telephones started ringing.”

However, the relationship between Crosby and the sponsor was under strain and on May 15, Variety announced, “Woodbury has not renewed with Bing Crosby for the fall. Primarily, standing in the way of a new contract is the refusal of the account to again allow the singer to have full control over the programme. Under the past season’s arrangement, Crosby picked his own supporting cast and numbers.”

The last broadcast of the series took place on June 11, 1935, when the guest was Martha Tilton. Crosby was soon to leave CBS for NBC and the Kraft Music Hall.
