= Georgie Stoll =

American conductor, composer, and jazz musician (1905–1985)

Georgie Stoll (born George Martin Stoll; May 7, 1905 – January 18, 1985) was a musical director, conductor, Academy Award-winning composer, and jazz violinist, associated with the Golden Age of Metro-Goldwyn-Mayer musicals and performers from the 1940s to 1960s. He was also later credited as George E. Stoll (sometimes without the middle initial).

== Violin prodigy ==
Stoll was born in Minneapolis, Minnesota, and made his musical debut as a boy violin prodigy, gaining nationwide fame. He toured North America as a jazz violinist on the Fanchon and Marco Vaudeville circuit and was part of the Jazzmania Quintet, appearing with Edythe Flynn in an early 1927 sound short. In San Diego, he became an orchestra and trio leader (his Rhythm Aces) and started to feature with Jack Oakie on radio programs, such as Camel Cigarette and NBC's Shell Oil Program. In 1934, Bing Crosby selected Stoll as his musical director for the second series of the CBS Woodbury radio programs Bing Crosby Entertains. For Decca, Georgie Stoll and His Orchestra accompanied Crosby and Louis Armstrong in the successful 1936 recordings of Pennies from Heaven. Stoll and his orchestra appeared on screen the same year in MGM's Swing Banditry.

== Metro-Goldwyn-Mayer musical director ==
In 1937, Stoll joined the Metro-Goldwyn-Mayer music department and was the musical director (frequently conductor too) for titles such as Honolulu, Ice Follies of 1939 and the Rooney-Garland hit Babes in Arms. He conducted the stage band which toured with Judy Garland and Mickey Rooney upon the release of The Wizard of Oz. He was given a single "Ruby Slipper" by Judy Garland upon completion of the Wizard of Oz (where he orchestrated the tornado and Wicked Witch's Castle escape scenes with George Bassman).

At the studio Stoll worked frequently with the director Edward Buzzell and producers Arthur Freed, Roger Edens and Joe Pasternak. He was also a favorite pinochle-playing buddy of studio head Louis B. Mayer.

Stoll kept his connection with the jazz world and visited clubs looking for rising talent. He recruited one of the first black arrangers at MGM, Calvin Jackson with whom he worked on the original music for his 1945 Oscar-winning score for the Kelly-Sinatra Anchors Aweigh. Stoll also encouraged the teenaged André Previn and used him to write many arrangements.

In 1943, Stoll conducted Garland through the first two of her original cast albums for Decca Records from her popular movies, such as Girl Crazy and Meet Me in St. Louis, which included the hit single The Trolley Song (#3 on Billboard's Best Selling charts). His other recordings were quite eclectic: spanning the popular (often with harmonica virtuosoes Leo Diamond or Larry Adler), easy listening orchestral (e.g. MGM's Hollywood Melodies album) to the postwar American sessions of the tenor Lauritz Melchior.

== Later career ==
Stoll's career received a boost when Pasternak hired him and his old colleague George Sidney to work with Elvis Presley on some of his later and better pictures (e.g. Viva Las Vegas and Spinout). He also composed the underscore for the 1960 Spring break romp Where the Boys Are and another Connie Francis followup.

After 9 Oscar nominations (last in 1962 for Billy Rose's Jumbo), Stoll retired upon completing the original music for the Ann-Margret vehicle Made in Paris. Stoll died, aged 79, in Monterey, California.

In September 2001, Stoll's Best Score Oscar was offered in an estate sale at the Butterfields auction house. The actor Kevin Spacey later revealed that he anonymously secured it for $156,875 and subsequently returned it to the Academy.

In October 2009, Stoll's Amati violin was sold by Tarisio Auctions for $620,000, the world record as of 2012 for a Nicolo Amati sold at auction.
