= Ken Niles =

American actor (1906–1988)

- Publicity photo of Niles
- Born: Kenneth Niles; December 9, 1906; Livingston, Montana, U.S.
- Died: October 31, 1988 (aged 81); Santa Monica, California, U.S.
- Occupation: Radio announcer
- Spouse: Nadia Niles
- Children: 2

Ken Niles (December 9, 1906 – October 31, 1988) was an American radio announcer. Niles was born in Livingston, Montana.

Niles debuted in radio on KJR in Seattle, Washington, late in the 1920s. He began a series of original radio dramas called Theater of the Mind in 1928. Niles subsequently narrated, or served as announcer, in several other feature films. His most notable film role was the murdered lawyer Leonard Eels in Out of the Past (1947) with Robert Mitchum.

Niles also served as commercial announcer and foil for Bing Crosby in the Bing Crosby Entertains series (1933-1935) and also on several series sponsored by Camel Cigarettes, notably The Abbott and Costello Show. Niles was frequently paired in comedy skits opposite Elvia Allman as his fictitious wife, "Mrs. Niles". He was also the announcer for The Amazing Mrs. Danberry.

For his work in radio, he received a star on the Hollywood Walk of Fame, as did his brother, making them the first brothers to be so honored. Ken Niles' star is at 6711 Hollywood Boulevard, in the Radio section. It was dedicated February 8, 1960.

== Family ==
He was married to Nadia Niles, and had two children, Kenneth Niles and Denise Niles. His elder brother, Wendell Niles, was also a radio announcer.

== Filmography ==
Year	Title	Role	Notes
1937	Hollywood Hotel	Ken Niles	
1938	Men Are Such Fools	Bill	Uncredited
1939	Sweepstakes Winner	First Radio Announcer	Uncredited
1941	Harmon of Michigan	Ken Niles	
1943	Hit Parade of 1943	Announcer	Uncredited
1943	Shantytown	Radio Announcer	Uncredited
1944	Lady, Let's Dance	Announcer	
1945	Swingin' on a Rainbow	New York City Radio Announcer	Uncredited
1946	The Inner Circle	Ken - Radio Announcer	
1947	Magic Town	Reporter	Uncredited
1947	Out of the Past	Eels	
1948	You Were Meant for Me	Narrator	Voice, Uncredited
1949	My Friend Irma	Radio Contest Announcer	Uncredited
1951	The Fat Man	Dr. Henry Bromley D.D.S.	Uncredited
1956	NBC Matinee Theater		Episode: "The Young and the Damned"
1962	The Donna Reed Show	Professor Earnshaw	Episode: "Explorer's Ten"
1968	The Bob Hope Show		1 episode, (final appearance)
