= 15 Minutes with Bing Crosby =

American radio musical series

15 Minutes with Bing Crosby was Bing Crosby's first solo radio series, which aired on the CBS network from September 2, 1931 until October 31 of the same year. It was to have a major impact on his career.

== Background ==
Crosby had appeared on radio on many occasions as a member of The Rhythm Boys trio, first as part of the Paul Whiteman orchestra and later in the nightly broadcasts with Gus Arnheim from the Cocoanut Grove in the Ambassador Hotel in Los Angeles. It was at the Cocoanut Grove that Bing's solos made him stand out from the Rhythm Boys and a dispute with the management at the Grove more or less led to the break-up of the trio in May 1931. Bing had already started making records under his own name and then he made several short films for Mack Sennett which were well received.

A regular nationwide radio broadcast show was the next logical step in the development of his solo career. Bing and his attorney, Roger Marchetti, traveled from Los Angeles to New York seeking $1,500 a week on sustaining time and $3,000 a week if and when a sponsor was found. As Bill Paley, CEO of CBS, wrote; "It was an astounding price at the time, in fact an outrage, but I did not want to lose him. I negotiated as hard as I could, but we finally settled for his asking price. ... What made Bing Crosby's first contract with CBS so extravagant was that he came to our network as new or developing talent, just as had Morton Downey, Kate Smith, the Mills Brothers, and others, to be put on the air on a sustaining basis; that is, without advertiser support. Under this new contract policy, we usually paid such talent a little over $100 a week, or at most $500 a week, until we could find a sponsor."

Variety announced the news on August 25, 1931 and touched on an ongoing problem with the musicians' union following the dispute with the Cocoanut Grove. "With CBS, Crosby will receive around $1,500 a week, from accounts, although in the east he is still an unknown on the radio. The Ambassador hotel contract which he broke would have paid him $250. According to the musicians' union ruling, Crosby can perform with union accompaniment anywhere but in Los Angeles. In that city he is barred from any amusement places that are considered opposition to Gus Arnheim at the Ambassador."

Much publicity heralded the planned debut of 15 Minutes with Bing Crosby on August 31, 1931 but after rehearsing all that afternoon at the CBS HQ at 484 Madison Avenue, Bing was unable to go ahead with the six nights-a-week show at 11 pm. The next night Bing did not appear either and rumors started to circulate that he was either drunk or too nervous to sing. Finally on Wednesday September 2, came the answer. Rehearsing in air-conditioned rooms had given him laryngitis. Starting at 11 pm that night, Bing completed his first solo radio show with Eddie Lang playing guitar and with an orchestra conducted by Victor Young. He sang "Just One More Chance," "I Found a Million Dollar Baby," and "I'm Through with Love." The opening theme played by the orchestra was "Too Late" and the sheet music of this song quickly stated that it was from Fifteen Minutes of Bing Crosby.

== Reception ==
The Los Angeles Illustrated Daily News commented: "So far as Southern California goes, Amos 'n' Andy listenage has been sadly cut, what with Bing Crosby back on the old air at the same time. Despite two false starts early in the week, due to bad case of laryngitis, Crosby has come back strong and is his old self again..." Variety made some suggestions. "When Crosby first came to town, WABC had him warbling around 10:30 or 11 at night. This hour was soon discarded for the more important period of 7 pm. ... Getting an earful of Crosby over a series of programs doesn't leave much doubt that he's not entirely at ease when delivering an unfamiliar song. ... If he can work out a schedule allowing him the same preparation for radio as for recording, he's a cinch for ether popularity."

The nationwide shows continued daily (except Sundays) on a sustaining basis until October 31, 1931 from station WABC in New York. Harry Von Zell was the announcer. Freddie Rich led the orchestra after the first week. Russ Columbo was broadcasting for NBC at 11:30 pm each night as competition for Bing with Variety noting "Scrap between NBC & CBS over Russ Columbo and Bing Crosby is getting warm."

Crosby's popularity soon attracted a sponsor – the American Tobacco Company – and rather than Lucky Strike cigarettes, the company's president, George Washington Hill, chose to promote another of the company's products, Cremo Cigars.

== Bing Crosby – The Cremo Singer ==
Starting on November 3, 1931, Crosby became The Cremo Singer which broadcast from CBS station WABC (studio 8) in New York between 7:15 and 7:30 pm six nights a week (not Sundays) until February 27, 1932. David Ross was the announcer and Carl Fenton conducted the orchestra. A further broadcast was made at 11:00 pm each night for the West Coast audiences. "Where the Blue of the Night" was chosen as Bing's radio theme song. The show had a Co-operative Analysis of Broadcasting rating of 6.9 compared with Amos 'n' Andy (38.1), Rudy Vallee (24.7) and Paul Whiteman (19.1). The ratings were known as Crossleys, named after Archibald Crossley, the man who conducted them.

Variety heard one of the shows on November 9 and reported: "Certified Cremo Cigar Company must have stepped high to corral Bing Crosby, the rage of the radio hour, for their WABC broadcast. But, judging by his work, he's worth it... On the air Monday night he used, 'Now That You're Gone', 'Then She's Mine' (sic) and 'Goodnight, Sweetheart'. All these he threw off in the manner that has brought him forward so fast in the favor of the public. It is highly individual, belongs to him alone and he need stand in no fear of competition, because, while he may have imitators, there will be only one Bing Crosby."

Saturday, February 27, 1932, marked Crosby's last appearance as the Cremo Singer as the sponsor abruptly cancelled the show which puzzled CBS President Bill Paley for a couple of years until he received an explanation. It seems that the Cremo cigar was heavily advertised and sold as a machine-made cigar, which supposedly had a big advantage over the handmade variety because no worker's saliva would touch the cigar wrapper in making the cigar. However, sales of the cigar went so well that the production manager had to augment the machine-made cigars with some of the hand-made variety. He had not told his superiors about this and when the company president eventually found out, he cancelled the radio show because his advertising would have been shown to be untrue.

The singer then reverted to broadcasting on a sustained basis.

== 15 Minutes with Bing Crosby unsponsored radio show (March 8 – July 15, 1932, CBS) ==
On March 8, 1932, Crosby commenced evening radio shows on three nights a week for CBS on station WABC, on a sustaining basis, with Freddie Rich's Orchestra. The first week the shows aired on Tuesday, Thursday, and Saturday in the 6:30–6:45 pm time slot before switching to a Monday, Wednesday, and Friday format. In April Crosby embarked on a tour of Paramount-Publix theatres, working across the country to Hollywood where he was to make the film The Big Broadcast. At each location, he continued to broadcast his show until he reached the West Coast. On July 12, Variety carried a review of Bing's radio show. "With a new corking musical background, Bing Crosby was at his best over WABC from a Hollywood pickup. ..." Soon afterwards Crosby's contract expired on July 15 and he and CBS could not agree on the new one which apparently would have imposed a 35 percent pay cut on him. Crosby did not return to the air until January 1933.

== Chesterfield Cigarettes Presents "Music That Satisfies" (also known as Chesterfield Time) ==
After almost seven months off the air, Bing Crosby started a new radio program called Chesterfield Cigarettes Presents "Music That Satisfies" on CBS, originating from station WABC in New York.

The "Music That Satisfies" series had begun in the fall of 1932 with Arthur Tracy, Ruth Etting and Alexander Gray appearing on different nights of the week accompanied by Nat Shilkret and his Orchestra. Norman Brokenshire was the announcer.

Sponsored by Chesterfield Cigarettes, the show was re-launched in January 1933 and broadcast each night (except Sundays) from WABC New York, at 9–9:15 pm EST with Crosby appearing on Wednesdays and Saturdays. On other nights, Ruth Etting (Mondays and Thursdays) and Tom Howard and George Shelton (Tuesdays and Fridays) were featured. Jane Froman replaced Howard and Shelton on February 21. The show came from New York with Norman Brokenshire again acting as announcer and Lennie Hayton conducting the orchestra. Eddie Lang accompanied Crosby, who used "Just an Echo" as his closing theme song. Crosby's contract paid him $2000 a week for 13 weeks and he made his bow on January 4. Variety liked it saying, "... As far as this quarter hour is concerned, it is highly palatable stuff, if not particularly distinguished. Crosby and Hayton are both adept but the presentation is quite formula featuring Crosby in three and a half songs not counting the 'Please' vamp-in."

Eddie Lang had a chronically inflamed sore throat and had felt ill for a year or eighteen months. Crosby persuaded Lang to see a doctor and the doctor advised a tonsillectomy. Unfortunately Lang did not come out from under the general anaesthetic and he died on March 26, 1933.

Crosby had to leave for Hollywood after his appearance on the show on March 29 to make College Humor for Paramount Pictures. The film studio agreed to pay the line charges figure of around $1800 a week and for the band (another $2300 weekly) for the balance of Crosby's contract with Chesterfield which ran until April 15, 1933. Paul Douglas was the announcer for the Hollywood based show with Raymond Paige becoming conductor. After the April 15 program the show was discontinued for the summer.
