= Bing Crosby on Armed Forces Radio in World War II =

Bing Crosby was heavily involved with the Armed Forces Radio Service during World War II.

== Background ==
After the attack on Pearl Harbor, the House and Senate required that all men in the age range 20 to 44 years inclusive, register for the draft and Crosby, who was then aged 38, duly did so. From interviews he gave around that time he fully expected to be called up. However, as a married man with dependents, he was a long way down the priority list for being drafted. Crosby wanted to do as much as possible for the war effort pending being drafted but it soon became evident that he was unlikely to be conscripted because of his age and his family. It does seem that he was very embarrassed at not being called up and it was evidently decided that he could do more to help the war effort by entertaining and boosting war bond sales than by being in uniform. Crosby's embarrassment about his absence from the armed forces ended on December 5, 1942 when the War Dept. suspended induction of men 38 years of age or older.

On January 29, 1942, in response to a request from General MacArthur on behalf of his soldiers, Crosby sent his Kraft Music Hall radio show by shortwave to the American forces besieged in the Philippines at Corregidor. He dedicated the opening song “The Caissons Go Rolling Along” to the Philippine defenders.

The War Department subsequently established the Armed Forces Radio Service (AFRS) on May 26, 1942 to keep American forces informed and entertained and Crosby was quick to become involved. Within days, he recorded his first guest shot in a Command Performance show. The Command Performance series was recorded weekly on transcription discs for shipment to overseas forces instead of being broadcast live, and Crosby's experience of recording for radio in this way was to have a major impact on his show-business activities after the war when he pushed hard to be allowed to record his shows. This led to a break with his long-running Kraft Music Hall show and a switch to Philco Radio Time.

Other major weekly AFRS shows were Mail Call and GI Journal, and the singer was a regular participant in these too. On March 8, 1943, Time magazine said, "The best in radio—and a lot of it—goes to U.S. forces at the fighting fronts. They have received over 1,000 special programs which U.S. radio fans would give plenty to hear. Forty-odd shows a week are heard only by the armed forces."

== Crosby Involvement ==
Armed Forces Radio Service shows in which Crosby participated during wartime (December 7, 1941 - August 15, 1945) totalled more than 70 and included Command Performance (30 appearances), Mail Call (13 appearances), GI Journal (19 appearances), Song Sheet (at least 5 appearances), Personal Album (many appearances), Front Line Theatre, and Jubilee (at least twice). In addition his regular Kraft Music Hall show was transcribed for the Armed Forces.

In the three years eight months of the war, Crosby made eight full-length films, twelve short films (including guest appearances), appeared in at least 190 other radio programs, recorded 160 songs for commercial release and out of these an incredible 54 were top thirty hits including nine which reached No. 1. In addition his songs “White Christmas” and “Swinging on a Star” won the Oscar for the best film song of their respective years. A total of 71 V-discs were issued containing his material, some of which was specially recorded. In all, Crosby spent a total of 25 weeks touring to entertain servicemen without adding in his numerous weekend trips. His fund-raising activities resulted in the sales of millions of dollars of war bonds and he raised substantial amounts for the USO, Red Cross and other charities.
