= Gregory Crosby =

American poet, writer and professor

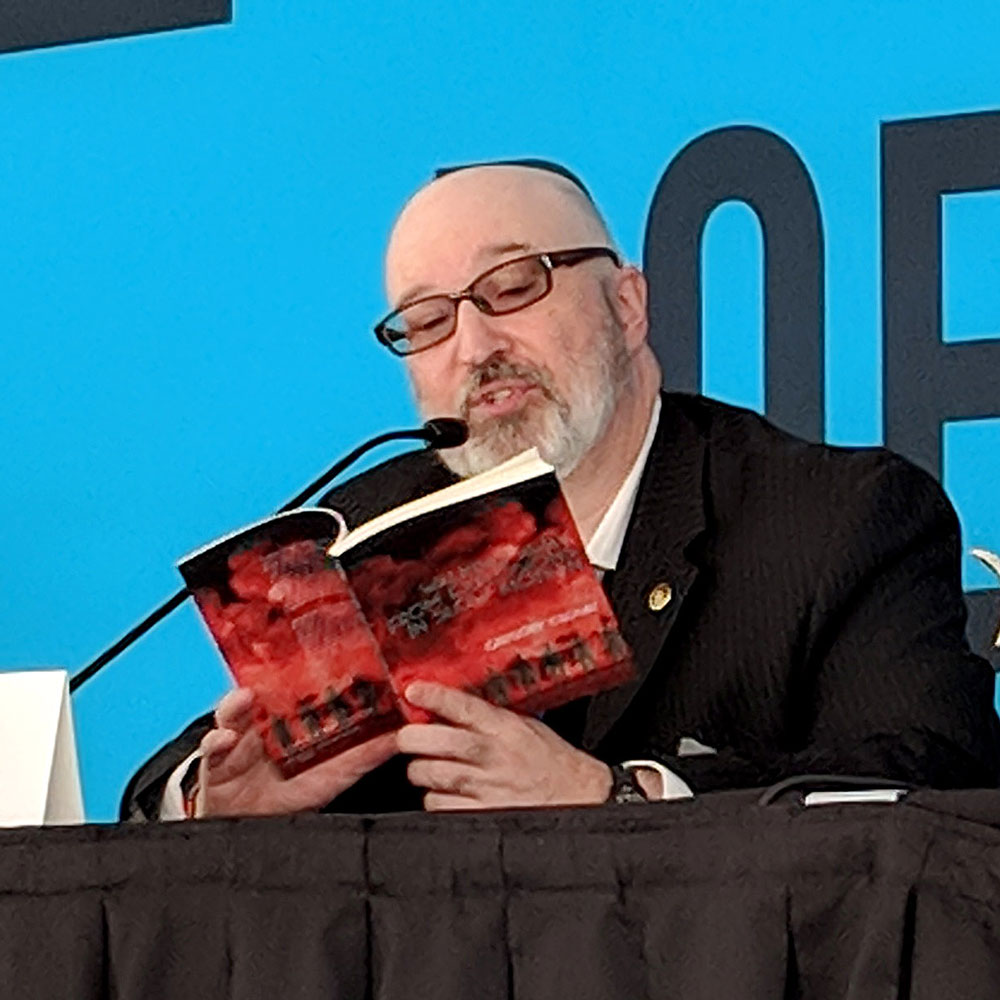
- Poet Gregory Crosby reads from his book at the 2018 Las Vegas Book Festival.
- Occupations: Poet, writer, professor

Gregory Crosby is an American poet, writer, and professor.

== Biography ==
Crosby attended University of Nevada, Las Vegas, where he earned his Bachelor of Arts degree. He later earned his Master of Fine Arts in creative writing from City College of New York. He is currently adjunct faculty at both the John Jay College of Criminal Justice, and Lehman College at the City University of New York.

Crosby lived in Las Vegas for a number of years, during which time he wrote for local publications and served as a poetry consultant for the City of Las Vegas Cultural Affairs Division, helping to develop the Poets Bridge public art project, which features his poem "The Long Shot" inscribed in bronze. For a time in the 1990s, he hosted a weekly poetry event called "Club Virtual" at a now-defunct coffeehouse called Café Rainbow.

Crosby is the author of several poetry books, including Said No One Ever and Walking Away from Explosions in Slow Motion. His writing style ″comes from the example of poets who simultaneously engage with received form and with invented form″, which Crosby says is influenced by the likes of Frederick Seidel, John Berryman, Anne Carson and Glyn Maxwell.

== Selected publications ==
- Said No One Ever, Brooklyn Arts Press, 2021
- Walking Away from Explosions in Slow Motion, The Operating System, 2018
- The Book of Thirteen, Yes Poetry Press, 2016
- Spooky Action at a Distance, The Operating System, 2017
