= At Your Command =

- 1931 sheet music cover, Robbins Music, New York.

Single by Bing Crosby
- Released: 1931
- Label: Brunswick
- Songwriters: Bing Crosby, Harry Tobias, Harry Barris

Bing Crosby singles chronology
"I'm Through With Love" (1931)	"At Your Command" (1931)	"Many Happy Returns of the Day" (1931)

"At Your Command" is a 1931 song recorded by Bing Crosby on June 24, 1931 with piano accompaniment by Harry Barris. The lyrics were written by Bing Crosby and Harry Tobias, The music was composed by Harry Barris.

The song was released as a Brunswick Records 78 single and the recording reached no. 1 on the pop singles charts for three weeks in the U.S., with a chart run of nine weeks. The song was published by Robbins Music Corporation in New York.

Bing Crosby sang "At Your Command" in the 1931 Mack Sennett two-reeler movie short I Surrender Dear.

The song has appeared on the following Bing Crosby albums:

- The Voice of Bing in the 30s, Brunswick, 1959
- No. 1 Hits & Million Sellers, Castle Pie, 2002
- All the Number-One Hits, Goldies, 2002
- Swinging on a Star: His Fifty Greatest Hits of the 30s & 40s, ASV/Living Era, 2003
- Gold, Geffen, 2008
