= Henry Pleasants (music critic) =

- Born: May 12, 1910; Wayne, Pennsylvania
- Died: January 4, 2000 (aged 89); London, England
- Occupations: Spy, music critic

Henry Pleasants (May 12, 1910 – January 4, 2000) was an American music critic and intelligence officer.

== Early career ==
Pleasants studied voice, piano and composition at the Curtis Institute of Music, from which he received an honorary doctorate in 1977. In 1930, at age 19, he became a music critic for the Philadelphia Evening Bulletin and was the paper's music editor from 1934 to 1942, when he enlisted in the U.S. Army.

In 1948–49, he re-entered the military as an army liaison officer with the Austrian government. He left the army to enter the Foreign Service in 1950, serving as an intelligence officer in Munich. From 1950 to 1956, he was the CIA station chief in Bern, and subsequently from 1956 until his retirement from the CIA in 1964, CIA station chief in Bonn. He was involved in espionage during the Cold War, living with Reinhard Gehlen, a former Nazi general and a top intelligence official for West Germany, to evaluate his "suitability." The Gehlen Organization, which the former general led, became the forerunner of the postwar West German Federal Intelligence Service.

== Writing ==
Following the end of the war, from 1945 to 1955, Pleasants contributed articles on European musical events to The New York Times. He also wrote regularly for Opera Quarterly, was London editor for the magazine Stereo Review, and for 30 years, beginning in 1967, was the London music critic for the International Herald Tribune. In 1964, he retired from the service and settled in London with his wife, Virginia Pleasants, a harpsichordist and fortepianist.

His most famous and controversial work was his 1955 publication The Agony of Modern Music, a polemical attack on the direction taken by much of twentieth-century music and an argument in favor of jazz as the "true" master music of the time. The book stated, "Serious music is a dead art. The vein which for 300 years offered a seemingly inexhaustible yield of beautiful music has run out. What we know as modern music is the noise made by deluded speculators picking through its slag pile." He further developed this critique of contemporary music in Death of a Music?: The Decline of the European Tradition and the Rise of Jazz (1961) and Serious Music and All That Jazz (1969).

Henry Pleasants's first and major enthusiasm, however, was the human voice. His The Great Singers: From the Dawn of Opera to Our Own Time (1966) became a standard reference work. Other books on singers and singing were The Great American Popular Singers, Opera in Crisis: Tradition, Present, Future, and The Great Tenor Tragedy: The Last Days of Adolphe Nourrit, about the nineteenth-century French singer who committed suicide after his vocal style became outdated. His article "Elvis Presley," reprinted in Simon Firth, ed., Popular Music: Critical Concepts in Media and Cultural Studies, volume 3 (2004), describes in detail Elvis Presley's "extraordinary compass and very wide range of vocal color."

== Henry Pleasants Lecture Series ==
The American Institute of Musical Studies in Graz, Austria, holds an annual lecture series named in honor of Henry Pleasants, who lectured and conducted seminars on singing there for 29 years.

== Death ==
On January 4, 2000, Pleasants died aged 89 in a London hospital after suffering a ruptured aorta. He was survived by his wife, harpsichordist Virginia Pleasants (1911–2011); two sisters, Constantia Bowditch of Peterborough, New Hampshire, and Nancy Logue of Clarksville, Tennessee; and a brother, William, of Bethel, Delaware (1911–2005).
