= Where the Blue of the Night (Meets the Gold of the Day) =

Song by Bing Crosby
- Recorded: November 23, 1931
- Genre: Show tunes, Traditional Pop
- Length: 3:04
- Songwriters: Bing Crosby, Roy Turk, Fred E. Ahlert

1931 sheet music cover, DeSylva, Brown and Henderson Music Publishers, New York.

"Where the Blue of the Night (Meets the Gold of the Day)" was the theme Bing Crosby selected for his radio show. It was recorded in November 1931 with Bennie Krueger and his Orchestra. The song was featured in a Mack Sennett movie short starring Bing Crosby. Crosby recorded the song on several occasions starting with the November 23, 1931 version with Bennie Kruger and his Orchestra. He next recorded it on July 20, 1940 with The Paradise Island Trio. On July 17, 1945 he recorded it with John Scott Trotter and his Orchestra and his final recording was on April 21, 1954 with Buddy Cole and his Trio for his Musical Autobiography set.

The song was originally "When the Gold of the Day Meets the Blue of the Night", but the title was changed before recording. Because Crosby wrote the verse for the song, writers Roy Turk and Fred E. Ahlert included him in the songwriting credit. Although the song was popular and successful, Crosby did not take special pride in having written it, saying much later, "I really think I'd trade anything I've ever done if I could have written just one hit song." The Bing Crosby composition "At Your Command" was, however, number one for three weeks on the U.S. pop singles chart in 1931 and "I Don't Stand a Ghost of a Chance with You", which he also co-wrote, is one of the most recorded pop and jazz standards of the 1930s.

The 1931 recording of "Where the Blue of the Night" reached #4 on the Billboard pop singles chart in 1932. Crosby charted again with the song in 1940, hitting #27 on charts with it in that year.

The 1931 composition will enter the public domain on January 1, 2027. (Note: Under R223341.)

== Later Recordings ==
The 1958 remake by Tommy Mara entered the Billboard and Cashbox Top 100s.

The song was recorded by Russ Columbo, Will Rogers, In 1969, country artist Hank Locklin had a charting single with his cover of the song. It peaked at number 34 on the Billboard Hot Country Songs chart and was his last top 40 hit. Eddie Fisher, Connie Francis, Rosemary Clooney Jane Morgan, Glenn Cross, Johnny Knight, Bob Crosby, Phillip Crosby, Bob and Alf Pearson, Robin Ward, Harold Van Emburgh, and also in 1969 by The Bachelors, a popular Irish band. The song "When the Deal Goes Down" by Bob Dylan is based on the melody of this song, although performed as a waltz.

== Sources ==
- Giddins, Gary. Bing Crosby: A Pocketful of Dreams. 2001. pp. 259–60. ISBN 0-316-88188-0 and ISBN 0-316-88645-9.
- Grudens, Richard (2002). Bing Crosby – Crooner of the Century. Celebrity Profiles Publishing Co.. ISBN 1-57579-248-6.
- Macfarlane, Malcolm. Bing Crosby – Day By Day. Scarecrow Press, 2001.
- Osterholm, J. Roger. Bing Crosby: A Bio-Bibliography. Greenwood Press, 1994.
