= Larry Crosby =

American publicity director (1895–1975)

- Larry Crosby in 1923
- Born: Laurence Earl Crosby; January 3, 1895; Tacoma, Washington, U.S.
- Died: February 7, 1975 (aged 80); Century City, Los Angeles, California, U.S.
- Occupations: Manager, philanthropist, businessman, inventor, author, Army Officer
- Known for: Bing Crosby Manager; President of Bing Crosby Enterprises; President of Bing Crosby Enterprises Electronic Division; President of The Crosby Research Foundation; President of Bing Crosby National Pro-Amateur Golf; President of The Crosby Foundation; Founded Dixie Lee Crosby Memorial Foundation
- Spouse: Elaine Catherine Couper (m. 1926; died 1973)
- Children: Jack Crosby (1927–2015); Molly Crosby (1933–1953)
- Relatives: Bing Crosby (brother); Bob Crosby (brother); Harry Crosby (nephew); Gary Crosby (nephew); Dennis Crosby (nephew); Lindsay Crosby (nephew); Nathaniel Crosby (nephew); Phillip Crosby (nephew); Mary Crosby (niece); Chris Crosby (nephew)

Laurence Earl Crosby (January 3, 1895 – February 7, 1975) was the long-serving publicity director of his younger brother, Bing Crosby, a manager, a philanthropist, an inventor, and an author. He was the eldest of Bing's six siblings.

Bing and Larry's mom: Katie (Catherine "Kate Crosby")... "not only baked a wonderful pie, but sang like a bird, and it was common gossip when she was out rowing on the lake, that either Katie Harrigan or an angel is out there singing." Larry Crosby

"I don't think anything has been a struggle for Bing. Everything comes easy, but he's not a detail man. Here at the office he thinks we can do everything in one day, when actually it takes weeks. He wants it right now! He's a pretty good boss, but I think he listens to too many people." Larry Crosby

== Crosby family ==
The seven Crosby children were the four elder brothers Larry, Everett (1896–1966), Ted (1900–1973), and Bing (1903–1977), two sisters Catherine (1905–1974) and Mary Rose (1907–1990), and the youngest sibling, brother Bob (1913–1993). His parents were English-American bookkeeper Harry Lillis Crosby Sr. (1871–1950) and Irish-American Catherine Helen "Kate" Harrigan (1873–1964), daughter of a builder from County Cork, Ireland. Larry Crosby served in the United States Army during World War I. Larry Crosby attended an officers' training camp at the Presidio, San Francisco. After the training trains new troops at Camp Funston at Fort Riley, Manhattan, Kansas. Larry Crosby married Elaine Catherine Couper on May 4, 1926, in Wallace, Idaho. Ted and Larry Crosby wrote the 205 page book Bing, about their brother Bing Crosby, released in 1937. In 1946, Larry updated the book to 239 pages and was released as The Story of Bing Crosby, Larry had the foreword done by Bob Hope for the new book. Larry Crosby's son, John, married Beatrice Turner Crosby on January 19, 1947. They had three children, Michael Dennis Crosby (1948–), Cynthia Lane Crosby (1952–), James Patrick Crosby (1955–). Larry Crosby has a daughter named, Molly Manning Crosby (1933–1953). On August 25, 1953, Larry Crosby's daughter, Molly Crosby, died at St. John's Hospital at age 19, from complications of a throat infection. Larry's son, Jack Crosby (1927–2015), was the art director on the ABC daytime drama General Hospital for 17 years. Jack also worked on Seven Keys Show, hosted by Jack Narz. After working for ABC, Jack was the art direction teacher at Loyola Marymount University and Pepperdine University. Larry Crosby's wife, Elaine died on January 28, 1973, at St. John's Hospital. Larry died of cancer in the Century City area of Los Angeles on February 7, 1975, at the age of 80. Larry Crosby is buried in Holy Cross Cemetery, Culver City, California. Larry Crosby published the book Crosby Genealogy about the Crosby family tree. It was originally published privately, but is now public. Along with being the manager of Bing, Larry was the manager of the Music Maids, a vocal group started in 1939 by Trudy Erwin and Dottie Mesmer. Bing and the Music Maids recorded songs from 1939 to 1947. They were also in some in of Bing's shows, such as Broadway Melody of 1940, Hit Parade of 1943, Hoosier Holiday (1943), Girl Crazy (1943), Yolanda and the Thief (1945), and Riff Raff (1947).

== The Crosby Foundation ==
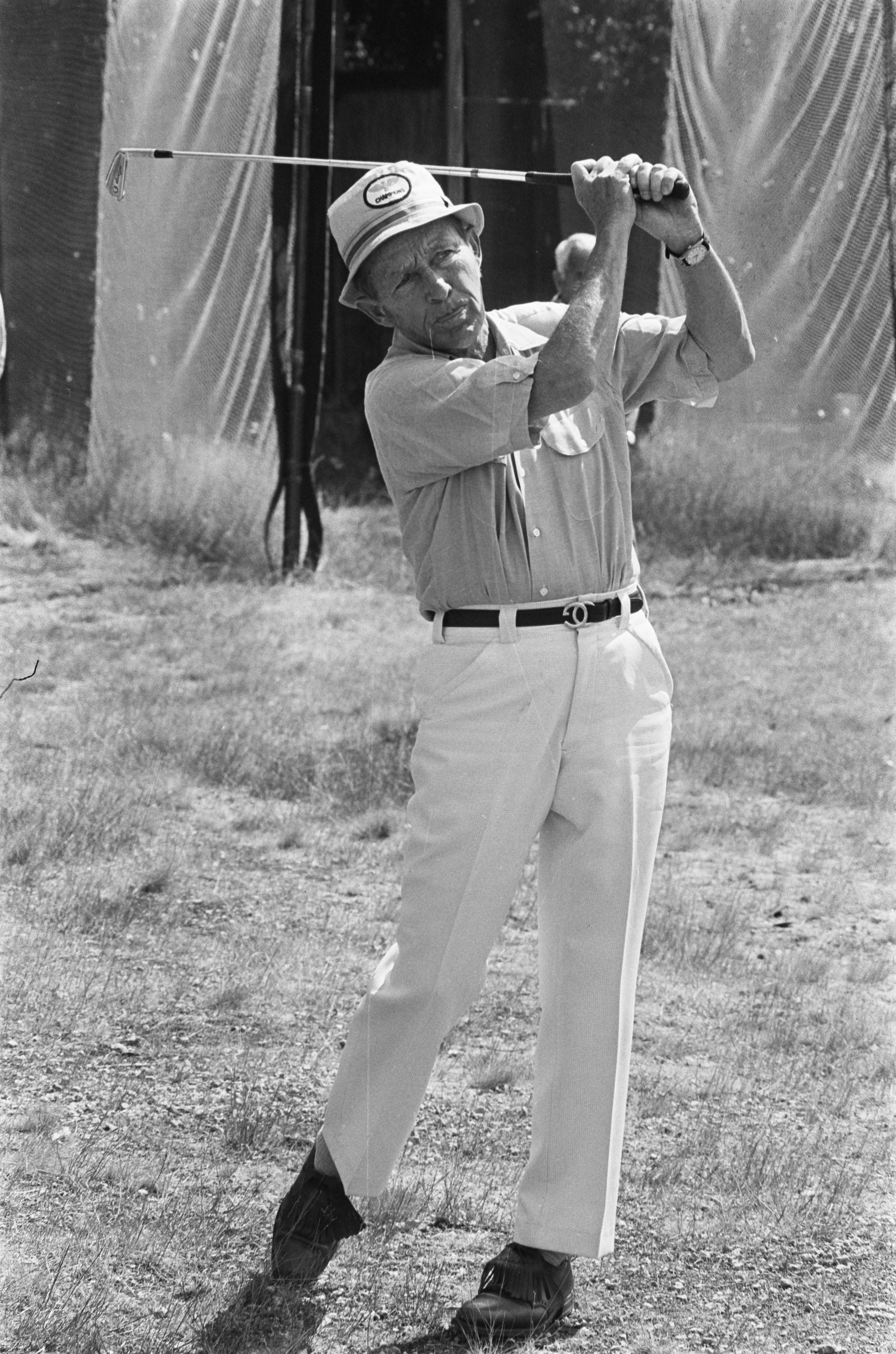
Bing Crosby golfing in 1975, Larry Crosby managed the events

Larry Crosby was president of The Crosby Foundation established 1902. Bing Crosby, through Larry Crosby, the president of The Crosby Foundation, shared his wealth. Bing also used his stardom and popularity to help friends, acquaintances and strangers. He helped others both publicly and privately.

Crosby managed the annual Bing Crosby National Pro-Amateur (also called the charity golf Crosby Clambake started in 1937; today known as the AT&T Pebble Beach National Pro-Am) at Pebble Beach, California, near Monterey. Starting in 1971, he was also the director of "Prisoners in Exchange for American Construction Enterprise (PEACE)", a group seeking better treatment of prisoners of war taken during the Vietnam War.

In 1937 Bing founded the Crosby Clambake golf tournament in California. The Crosby Clambake paired Hollywood stars with pro golfers. The event grew and provided donations to number of charities associated with golf and education. The CROSBY National Celebrity Golf Tournament was the United States longest running charity golf tournament. Bing died in 1977, but the tournament had continued in his honor by his wife Kathryn Crosby. In is 1986 the tournament moved from California to the Bermuda Run's, Bermuda Run Country Club near Winston-Salem, North Carolina.

Bing did not want to record the song "Silent Night", as he did not want money from a sacred song, so Larry arranged for all the royalties from the recording to be given to charity. Bing used Larry's name in the 1938 film The Star Maker, about a songwriter called Larry Earl. Larry and Bing founded the non-profit organization Dixie Lee Crosby Memorial Foundation, which aids cancer research, on December 27, 1952. Dixie Lee was the first wife of Bing; she died of cancer on November 1, 1952, at age 42. Gonzaga University opened a new library, the Crosby Library, now the Crosby Center, on November 3, 1957. Bing attended Gonzaga as a pre-law student. Larry, as Bing's business manager, set up a Bing memorabilia display at the library.

== Bing Crosby Enterprises ==
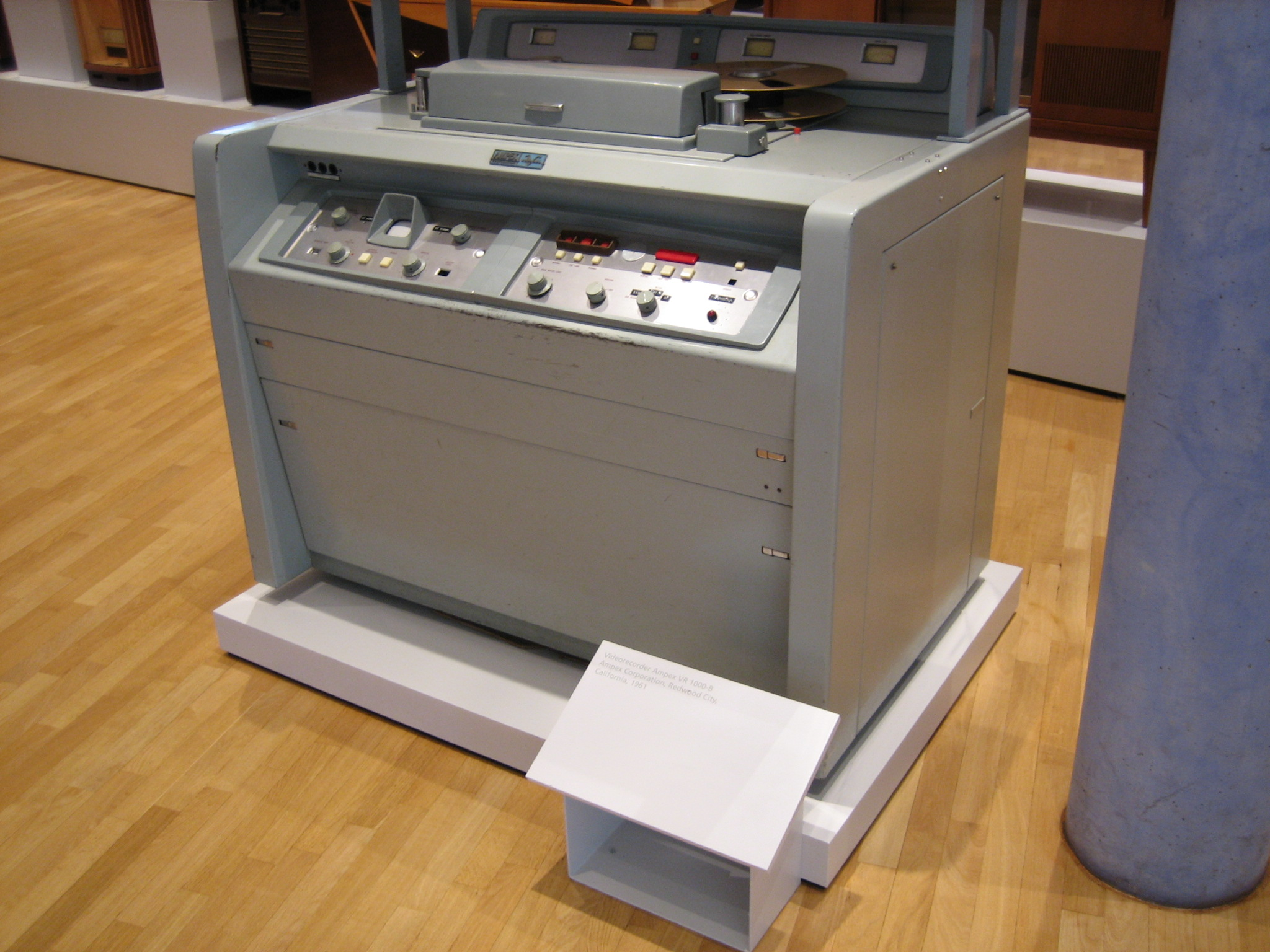
Larry and Bing help fund and development of the 2-inch Quadruplex videotape by Ampex

Larry Crosby was president of Bing Crosby Enterprises (BCE). Bing and Larry invested in: Auroratone films, window-sash holders, automatic coffee dispensers, Minute Maid frozen orange juice, and the Pittsburgh Pirates baseball club, Del Mar Turf Club, Del Mar Racetrack, US Army Signal Corpsman Jack Mullin's experimental magnetic audiotape (used on his show), 2-inch Quadruplex videotape, real estate, mines, oil wells, cattle ranches and many other investments. Bing Crosby also invested by buying Television stations.

Bing Crosby Enterprises and Larry's office was in a three-story building at 9028 Sunset Boulevard, West Hollywood, California, the office was built in 1936 as Bing's headquarters. Larry's office was on the second floor. California Historical Resources Commission voted to nominate the Bing Crosby Building for the listing on the National Register of Historic Places in 2018. BCE Electronic Division grew and moved to 9030 Sunset Boulevard. The office at 9030 Sunset Boulevard later also became the sales office for Ampex and 3M magnetic tape products (video and audio) in 1949. In 1948 Bing Crosby Enterprises was awarded the distributorship right for Ampex recorders and the 3M tape west of the Mississippi River. Bing and Larry set up a recording studio in Bing's ranch house in Elko, Nevada. Ampex and Bing Crosby Enterprises worked together on the first video tape recorder. Bing used two Magnetophon to audio record the Crosby Show, working with Jack Mullin as Chief Engineer. 3M had a new product black oxide plastic-backed magnetic tape that gave good recordings. The first radio show to broadcast from magnetic tape on 1 October 1947. BCE Electronic Division also was the first to do tape editing.

On 11 November 1951 Ampex and Bing Crosby Enterprises demonstrated the first playback from the prototype BCE Mark I recorder at 360 ips. BCE Mark I used the deck of an Ampex 200, a portable magnetic tape recorder and had a bandwidth of about 1 MHz (SDTV has about 4.5 MHz). Bing had used the Ampex 200 to make high quality recordings of his shows. BCE Mark II recorder had 12 tracks recorded on the 1 inch tape, with 10 of the tracks for the video, still with the modified Ampex 200 deck. Bing Crosby Enterprises recorders were used just for sound, video and to record telemetry data also. The Mark II produced a better picture but was still a prototype. Color video capable, BCE Mark III VTR was demonstrated in June 1955 used 100 ips on half-inch tape using longitudinal recording. CBS ordered three BCE Mark III VTRs in 1955. Ampex came up with a moving head on 2 inch tape that was of better quality in 1956. CBS canceled the BCE order and ordered Ampex VTRs. Bing also order the new Ampex VR-1000 VTR for Bing's his Spokane, Washington TV station, KXLY-TV. The BCE Mark III recorders were converted to wide-band instrumentation recorders.

- Larry was the head of The Crosby Research Foundation which encouraged inventors. During World War II the US Government worked with the foundation to develop products and ideas for the war effort. Bing Crosby's Research Foundation hosted Inventor's New Product Shows, to help inventor showcase inventions. Larry help start and supported the International Club Crosby. International Club Crosby was started in 1936 and is the world's longest-running fan club. International Club Crosby is recognized by the Guinness Book of World Records as the longest-running fan club.

== See also ==
- International Club Crosby
- John Scott Trotter
