= Phillip Crosby =

American actor and singer (1934–2004)

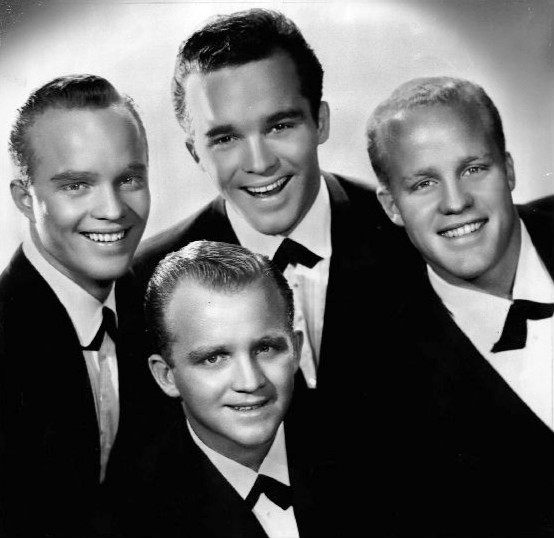
- The four Crosby brothers-(L-R) Dennis, Gary, Lindsay and Phillip in 1959
- Born: Phillip Lang Crosby; July 13, 1934; Los Angeles, California, U.S.
- Died: January 13, 2004 (aged 69); Woodland Hills, California, U.S.
- Resting place: Holy Cross Cemetery, Culver City
- Other name: Phil Crosby
- Education: Bellarmine College Preparatory; Washington State University
- Occupations: Actor, singer
- Spouses: Sandra Jo Drummond (m. 1958; div. 1963) Mary Joyce Gabbard (m. 1964; div. 1966) Georgi Edwards (m. 1967; div. 1969) Peggy J. Compton (m. 1972; div. 1975)
- Children: 5
- Parent(s): Bing Crosby; Dixie Lee
- Relatives: Gary Crosby (brother); Dennis Crosby (twin brother); Lindsay Crosby (brother); Harry Crosby III (half-brother); Mary Crosby (half-sister); Nathaniel Crosby (half-brother); Larry Crosby (uncle); Bob Crosby (uncle); Chris Crosby (cousin); Denise Crosby (niece)

Phillip Lang Crosby (July 13, 1934 – January 13, 2004) was an American actor and singer. He was one of the four sons of Bing Crosby and Dixie Lee; the others were his older brother Gary, his twin brother Dennis, and his younger brother Lindsay. Phillip began his career singing alongside his three brothers and his father.

== Early life and family ==
Crosby was born in Los Angeles, California. He graduated from Bellarmine College Preparatory in San Jose in June 1952 and went on to Washington State College at Pullman with his twin brother Dennis for a three-year animal husbandry course. It was thought for a time that twins might take over the running of their father's ranch in Elko, Nevada. It had been the custom for many years for Bing Crosby to take his sons to the ranch each summer for several weeks before going on to Hayden Lake, Idaho, prior to their return to school. As children, the twins were exposed to show business in a big way and appeared on Bing Crosby's various radio shows with their brothers Gary and Lindsay.

When he was 21 in 1955, Phillip inherited $200,000 from his late mother's trust. That same year, Phillip began his national service with the Army and was posted to West Germany in February 1956 to join his twin. They were part of the 24th Medical Detachment of the 10th Infantry Division at Schweinfurt. After leaving the army, Phillip went into show business.

== Singing career ==
Phillip had sung with his brothers on their father's radio shows and they participated in a record with Bing in 1950 called "A Crosby Christmas" which charted at number 22 in the Billboard lists in December, 1950.

After leaving the army, Phillip recorded four tracks for UPA-Chevron on July 29, 1958, including "Thanks" in which his father ad-libbed various comments. Phillip and Dennis had an amusing linking role on the Bing Crosby Show aired on ABC-TV on March 2, 1959.

When Phillip's younger brother, Lindsay, was released from the Army, the four brothers decided to form a vocal group called The Crosby Brothers. They were featured on the cover of Life on September 15, 1958. An appearance on The Phil Silvers Show on November 14, 1958, followed, and they made their debut as a singing group at Tucson, Arizona in 1959. Moving on to the Chez Paree, Chicago, in June 1959, they earned a good review from Variety which said

"CROSBY BROS. Chez Paree, Chicago. Songs 58 Mins. Bing Crosby's four sons are launched on the cabaret scene in high style. The frères—Gary, Phillip, Dennis and Lindsay—have a superlative act that is likely to abash those skeptics who surmised the boys would trade merely on the lustrous family name."

They continued to perform successfully at locations such as the Sahara in Las Vegas and the El Morocco nightclub in Montreal. However, after one of their performances at El Morocco in December 1959, the boys fought among themselves and Gary Crosby left the group.

Phillip, Dennis, and Lindsay continued without Gary and they were given useful exposure on the Bing Crosby Show seen on ABC-TV on February 29, 1960. Bing took the place of Gary to sing "Joshua Fit the Battle of Jericho" with his sons, who also sang two other songs themselves.

They made their first LP for their father's company, Project Records, in April 1960, which was released by MGM Records and was well received. "The Crosby Brothers – Dennis – Philip – Lindsay Crosby (MGM); "Dinah" (Mills*), a hip version of the oldie, makes a promising disk bow for this trio of Bing Crosby offspring. "The Green Grass Grows All Around" (Marfran*) is a bright ensemble of this folk tune. To promote the album, the brothers appeared on the I've Got a Secret show and taught the panel how to lip-sync to "I Can't Give You Anything but Love."

Starting at the Desert Inn in Las Vegas and continuing for the next two years, the three men enjoyed useful success as The Crosby Brothers at venues such as the Chi Chi in Palm Springs, The Venetian room at the Fairmont in San Francisco, and the Latin Quarter in New York. During their stay at the Latin Quarter, they appeared on the What's My Line? TV show on May 14, 1961.

On television, the Crosby Brothers starred on several high-profile shows such as Perry Como's Kraft Music Hall (twice), The Ed Sullivan Show (four times) and of course the Bing Crosby Show (twice). The Crosby Brothers act folded, however, when Lindsay Crosby had a breakdown in July 1962 in Juarez, Mexico. Lindsay had to be hospitalized for some time.

Eventually, Phillip decided to embark on a solo career, and he had parts in several films, as well as one of the Ben Casey episodes. He also guest-starred on The Bob Hope Christmas Special on January 17, 1964. Around this time, Phillip was one of the original investors in a chain of Mexican restaurants and he accepted what was at the time a generous offer to buy him out. The chain went on to become the huge Taco Bell organization and Phillip would have made a fortune if he stayed in.

As a singer, Phillip launched his solo act on April 27, 1965, at Hyatt's Backstage Bar in Burlingame, California. Having developed his act, Phillip went to Vietnam with Bob Hope twice to entertain the troops and enjoyed the experience so much that he returned there himself to sing on several occasions. He also appeared on The Bob Hope Vietnam Christmas Show on January 18, 1968, The Hollywood Palace show on March 23, 1968, and April 5, 1969 and The Ed Sullivan Show on June 15, 1969.

An opportunity then arose to buy an interest in a night club in Atlanta and he performed there nightly for some years. Phillip gave his final performance at an Elk's Club party in Burbank in 1983.

== Personal life ==
Crosby was married four times to:

1. Sandra Jo Drummond, a Las Vegas showgirl (1958–1963); two children, daughter Dixie Lee Crosby (deceased) and son Brian Patrick Crosby (deceased).
2. Mary Joyce Gabbard, an airline stewardess (1964–1966); two children, daughter Mary Elizabeth Crosby and son Bing (known as 'Flip') Crosby.
3. Georgi Edwards, a former Las Vegas showgirl (1967–1969)
4. Peggy J. Compton, an actress (1972–1975); one son Phillip L. Crosby Jr., (a crooner in Los Angeles who revitalizes some of Bing's old songs).

In his later years, Phillip's health was not good and he had problems with his back and knees following a motorcycle accident. In the 1980s, he was arrested several times for drunk driving and, despite 18 months of Alcoholics Anonymous, he told People, "I don't drink any more—but I don't drink any less."

Despite a promising start to life, the Crosby brothers were clearly overwhelmed by their emotional problems, which resulted in heavy drinking. Their mother died from ovarian cancer in 1952, but her health was not helped by acute alcoholism. Phillip's twin Dennis, and his younger brother, Lindsay, both died by suicide with shotguns, in their 50s. Gary died of lung cancer in 1995, aged 62. Gary Crosby wrote a book called Going My Own Way, alleging emotional and physical abuse by his father. Phillip refuted this and he gave an interview to Neil Blincow of The Globe in 1999 stating:

"My dad was not the monster my lying brother said he was, he was strict, but my father never beat us black and blue and my brother Gary was a vicious, no-good liar for saying so. I have nothing but fond memories of dad, going to studios with him, family vacations at our cabin in Idaho, boating and fishing with him.... He [Gary] knew it [the book Going My Own Way] would generate a lot of publicity and that was the only way he could get his ugly, no-talent face on television and in the newspapers. He wrote it out of greed. He wanted to make money and knew that humiliating our father and blackening his name was the only way he could do it. My dad took care of us from a very early age with a trust fund. But we blew it all. To my dying day, I'll hate Gary for dragging Dad's name through the mud. My dad was my hero. I loved him very much. And he loved all of us too, including Gary. He was a great father."

=== Political views ===
Crosby supported Barry Goldwater in the 1964 United States presidential election.

== Death ==
Crosby died on January 13, 2004, in Woodland Hills, California from a heart attack, aged 69.

== Discography ==
=== Albums ===
- A Crosby Christmas (EP) – with Dennis Crosby, Gary Crosby, Lindsay Crosby and Bing Crosby (1950)

The Crosby Brothers

- Presenting the Crosby Bros. (MGM, 1961)

Side one

1. "You Must Have Been a Beautiful Baby"
2. "Mine" (George Gershwin, Ira Gershwin)
3. "Limehouse Blues"
4. "Wrap Your Troubles in Dreams"
5. "Joshua"
6. "Mam'selle"

Side two

1. "Once in a While"
2. "I Can't Give You Anything But Love"
3. "The Green Grass Grows All Around"
4. "Dinah"
5. "Singin' in the Rain"
6. "Magic Is the Moonlight" (María Grever, Charles Pasquale)

=== Singles ===
- "Where the Blue of the Night (Meets the Gold of the Day)" (1963)
- "Little by Little" (1963)
- "Thanks"
- "Ball of Love"

== Filmography ==
- Out of This World (1945) – Himself, Kid in Audience
- Duffy's Tavern (1945) – Himself
- Screen Snapshots Series 25, No. 10: Famous Fathers and Sons (1946) – Himself
- Sergeants 3 (1962) – Cpl. Ellis
- Robin and the Seven Hoods (1963) – Robbo's Hood #3
- None but the Brave (1965) – Pvt. Magee (final film role)

=== Television ===
- The Phil Silvers Show (1 episode, November 14, 1958) – Himself
- What's My Line? (1 episode, May 14, 1961) – Himself
- I've Got a Secret (1 episode, July 26, 1961) – Himself
- The Ed Sullivan Show (5 episodes, 4 as Crosby Brothers, 1 solo) – Himself
- Ben Casey (1 episode, November 9, 1964)
- The Bob Hope Show (two appearances, 1964) – Himself
- The Hollywood Palace (2 episodes, 1968–1969) – Himself
