= Dennis Crosby =

American singer and actor (1934–1991)

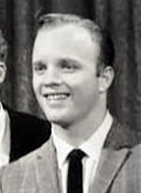
- Crosby in 1961
- Born: Dennis Michael Crosby; July 13, 1934; Los Angeles, California, U.S.
- Died: May 4, 1991 (aged 56); Novato, California, U.S.
- Resting place: Holy Cross Cemetery, Culver City, California, U.S.
- Spouses: Pat Sheehan (m. 1958; div. 1964) Arleen Newman (m. 1964; div. 1991)
- Partner: Marilyn Miller Scott
- Children: 7, including Denise
- Parent(s): Bing Crosby; Dixie Lee
- Relatives: Gary Crosby (brother); Phillip Crosby (twin brother); Lindsay Crosby (brother); Harry Crosby III (half-brother); Mary Crosby (half-sister); Nathaniel Crosby (half-brother); Larry Crosby (uncle); Bob Crosby (uncle); Chris Crosby (cousin)

Dennis Michael Crosby (July 13, 1934 – May 4, 1991) was an American singer and occasional actor, the son of singer and actor Bing Crosby and his first wife Dixie Lee, and twin brother of Phillip Crosby. He was the father of Star Trek TNG actress Denise Crosby, who was named after him.

== Early life ==
Dennis Crosby attended Bellarmine College Preparatory in San Jose with his other brothers where he graduated in 1952. He subsequently enrolled at Washington State University at Pullman on an animal husbandry course with his twin brother. He dropped out of the course after two years and was inducted into the Army in January 1955. He was initially posted to Fort Ord, California and then transferred to Fort Riley in Kansas for training with the US 10th Infantry Division, which transferred for duty in West Germany in the summer of 1955.

When he was 21 in 1955, Dennis inherited $200,000, equivalent to $2,404,000 in 2025, from his late mother's trust.

== Career ==
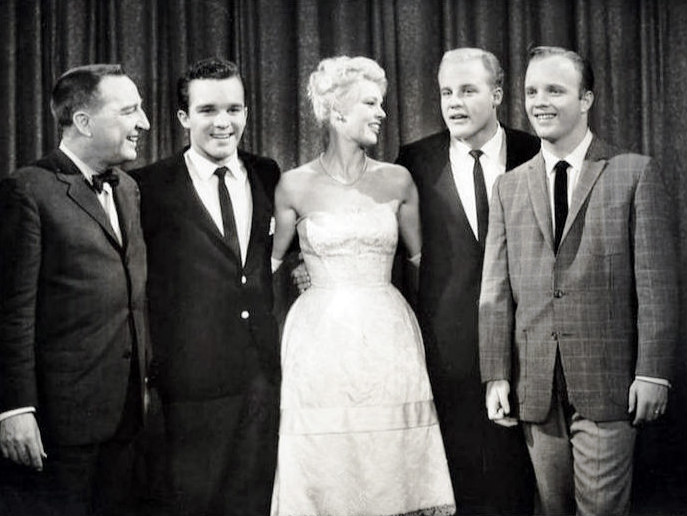
Crosby (right) with Garry Moore, Betsy Palmer and his brothers Lindsay and Phillip on I've Got a Secret in 1961

In the late 1950s, Dennis and his brothers Gary, Lindsay, and Phillip often performed as the Crosby Brothers in nightclubs and on The Ed Sullivan Show, though Dennis reputedly wished to avoid such appearances.

== Personal life ==
On May 4, 1958, Crosby married Pat Sheehan, a Las Vegas showgirl and model who had once dated his father, shortly after his mother had died. She was Miss San Francisco of 1950, Playboy Playmate of the month of October 1958, and a part-time actress.

Within days, Crosby was sued by another woman, Marilyn Miller Scott, over the paternity of her daughter, Denise Crosby. The sensational lawsuit lasted three years, and ended with Dennis being ordered to pay Scott child support and legal fees. This and the marriage to Sheehan and other details caused deep embarrassment for both him and his father. Although Bing Crosby died when his granddaughter was 19, the two reportedly never met.

Crosby and Sheehan had two sons: Dennis Michael Jr and Patrick Anthony. He adopted Gregory Crosby, who was his wife's son by a previous marriage.

In 1963, while working in Los Angeles for Bing Crosby Productions, he met Arleen Newman. On July 3, 1964, Crosby and Sheehan were divorced. Later that year, Crosby married Newman. The couple had three daughters, including: Erin Colleen Crosby, born February 25, 1971, in Los Angeles, and Kelly Lee Crosby. Crosby adopted Newman's daughter, Catherine Denise Crosby, from her first marriage to Mike Buell, which ended in divorce. Crosby and Newman divorced in 1991.

On December 11, 1989, Crosby's younger brother Lindsay died by suicide by gunshot.

== Death ==
Deeply distraught by his brother Lindsay's suicide and his own recent divorce, Crosby died from a self-inflicted gunshot wound on May 4, 1991, in Novato, California, aged 56. On January 14, 2006, Crosby's former wife, Pat Sheehan, died at the age of 74.

Their son Dennis Michael Crosby Jr. died on January 15, 2010 of an overdose. Patrick Anthony Crosby, born New Year's Eve 1960, died at Cedars-Sinai Medical Center in Los Angeles, on September 19, 2011, after a lengthy illness.

== Family relations ==
- Son of Bing Crosby
- Brother of Phillip (twin), Gary and Lindsay Crosby
- Half-brother of Harry Crosby, Nathaniel Crosby and Mary Crosby
- Nephew of the bandleader Bob Crosby
- Cousin of Chris Crosby
- Father of Denise Crosby

== Discography ==
- A Crosby Christmas (EP) – with Phillip Crosby, Gary Crosby, Lindsay Crosby and Bing Crosby (1950)

The Crosby Brothers

- Presenting the Crosby Bros. (MGM, 1961)

== Filmography ==
Year	Title	Role	Notes
1945	Out of This World	Himself	
1945	Duffy's Tavern	Himself	
1962	Sergeants 3	Pvt. Page	
