= Duffy's Tavern (film) =

1945 film by Hal Walker

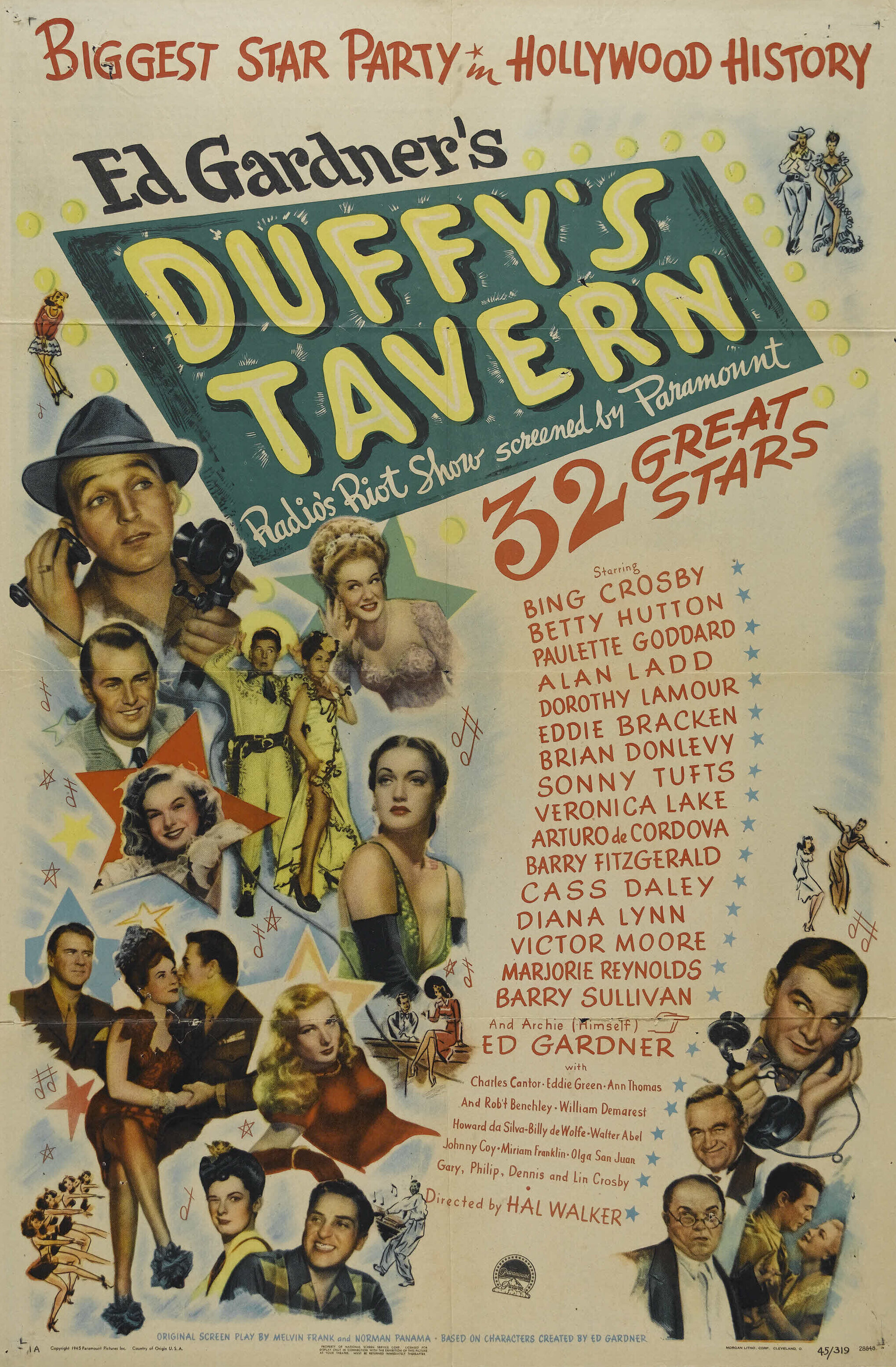
- Theatrical release poster
- Directed by: Hal Walker
- Screenplay by: Melvin Frank; Norman Panama
- Produced by: Danny Dare
- Starring: Ed Gardner; Bing Crosby; Betty Hutton; Paulette Goddard; Alan Ladd; Dorothy Lamour; Eddie Bracken; Brian Donlevy
- Cinematography: Lionel Lindon
- Edited by: Arthur P. Schmidt
- Music by: Robert Emmett Dolan
- Production company: Paramount Pictures
- Distributed by: Paramount Pictures
- Release date: September 5, 1945 (New York City)
- Running time: 97 minutes
- Country: United States
- Language: English

Duffy's Tavern is a 1945 American all-star cast musical comedy film directed by Hal Walker and written by Melvin Frank and Norman Panama. Produced and released by Paramount Pictures, the film stars Ed Gardner, Bing Crosby, Betty Hutton, Paulette Goddard, Alan Ladd, Dorothy Lamour, Eddie Bracken and Brian Donlevy, with Victor Moore, Marjorie Reynolds, Charles Cantor and Eddie Green.

Duffy’s Tavern was one of Paramount's ‘all-star cast’ films, similar to the 1942 film Star Spangled Rhythm. Based upon the popular radio sitcom of the same name by Ed Gardner, it is a large-scale musical based upon the characters from the radio show. Archie (played by Ed Gardner) with regulars Eddie (Eddie Green) and Finnegan (Charles Cantor). It was the film debut of three of the Crosby boys, Phillip, Dennis and Lindsay.

== Plot ==
Archie manages Duffy’s Tavern for Mr. Duffy, who is on vacation. Unbeknownst to Mr. Duffy Archie has hired 14 unemployed factory workers to be waiters for the tavern. The men used to work at P.J. O’Malley’s record factory but were made redundant when the shellac used to make the records was repurposed for weaponry. Archie hopes that by hiring P.J.’s ex-workers, he will be impressed and let him marry his daughter, Peggy.

Miss Duffy is sent by her father to check the ledger. When Miss Duffy discovers Archie has hired the factory workers, she plans to relay the news to her father. However, a lovesick Miss Duffy decides against it as she finds herself attracted to the men.

P.J. applies for a loan at the bank to buy shellac and reopen the factory, but his request is rejected. To stop Peggy from worrying, P.J. lies to her and says the bank accepted his request for a loan. Danny Murphy, a former record factory worker who has just returned home from World War II, confronts P.J. about reopening the factory with his fellow ex-workers. Peggy repeats P.J.’s lie about the loan, causing the workers to think the factory will reopen soon. Peggy is charmed by Danny and after he shows her around the abandoned factory they fall in love.

Mr. Duffy informs Archie that he is sending an accountant to the tavern to look at the ledger. Meanwhile, Danny tells P.J. he has found a shellac supplier. But P.J. reveals to Danny and the workers that the bank rejected his request for a loan and therefore he can’t buy the shellac or reopen the factory, causing the workers to angrily storm off. Archie realises he’ll be fired once Mr. Duffy discovers the tavern is $1,200 short on expenses from Archie hiring the factory workers.

Archie, P.J. and Peggy discover various movie stars are staying at a nearby hotel, where Peggy happens to work as a switchboard operator. To raise the money required to both reopen the factory and pay the tavern’s $1,200 of unpaid expenses, Archie, P.J. and Peggy plan a massive block party, with entertainment by the stars. Unbeknownst to Peggy, Archie and P.J. sneak into the hotel, hoping they can convince the stars to join the party once inside. Dressed as painters, Archie and P.J. stumble into Betty Hutton’s hotel room, where she is awaiting a massage. Betty assumes they are her masseurs, which the pair go along with. When the real masseur walks in, the two attempt to run away but are caught by the hotel’s staff.

Peggy overhears a fellow switchboard operator connecting a call about two crooks sneaking into the hotel. Peggy realises P.J. and Archie’s scheme and rushes to intervene. Peggy manages to convince Betty of the pair’s good intentions and Betty gets her fellow stars on board. As the block party starts, the accountant Mr. Duffy sent discovers the tavern is short on expenses and informs Mr. Duffy, who calls the police on Archie. Realising Archie will be arrested before the block party is over, Danny negotiates with a shellac and record distributor who agrees to reopen the factory and give a $1,200 bonus but only on the condition the factory can press 1,500 records in one night.

The factory manages to press all the records and the distributor gives them the $1,200 bonus. The bonus is given to Mr. Duffy who drops the charges against Archie. The block party is a success and Danny and Peggy get married while Archie gives up his job to romantically pursue Betty Hutton.

== Cast ==
- Ed Gardner as Archie
- Victor Moore as P.J. O'Malley
- Marjorie Reynolds as Peggy O'Malley
- Barry Sullivan as Danny Murphy
- Charles Cantor as Finnegan
- Eddie Green as Eddie the Waiter
- Ann Thomas as Miss Duffy
- Betty Hutton as herself
- Bing Crosby as himself
- Paulette Goddard as herself
- Alan Ladd as himself
- Dorothy Lamour as herself
- Eddie Bracken as himself
- Brian Donlevy as himself
- Sonny Tufts as himself
- Veronica Lake as herself
- Arturo de Córdova as himself
- Barry Fitzgerald as Bing Crosby's Father
- Cass Daley as herself
- Diana Lynn as herself
- Robert Benchley as himself
- William Demarest as himself
- Howard da Silva as Tough Guy
- Billy De Wolfe as Doctor
- Walter Abel as Director
- Johnny Coy as Dancer / Waiter
- Miriam Nelson as Dancer
- Charles Quigley as Ronald
- Olga San Juan as Gloria
- Bobby Watson as Masseur
- Gary Crosby as himself
- Phillip Crosby as himself
- Dennis Crosby as himself
- Lindsay Crosby as himself
- William Bendix as himself
- James Brown as himself
- Joan Caulfield as herself
- Gail Russell as herself
- Helen Walker as herself
- Jean Heather as herself
- Maurice Rocco as himself

== Soundtrack ==
Two original songs were written for the film, one by Jimmy Van Heusen and Johnny Burke and the other by Bernie Wayne and Ben Raleigh.

- "Doin' It The Hard Way" — (Written by Jimmy Van Heusen and Johnny Burke) Performed by Betty Hutton
- "You Can't Blame A Girl For Trying" — (Written by Bernie Wayne and Ben Raleigh) Performed by Cass Daley

Several songs included in the film were not originally from it. They are as follows:

- "When Irish Eyes Are Smiling" — (Written by Ernest Ball)
- "When Johnny Comes Marching Home" — (Written by Patrick Gilmore) Performed by Johnny Coy and Miriam Nelson
- "Swinging on a Star" — (Written by Jimmy Van Heusen & Johnny Burke) Performed by Bing Crosby, Betty Hutton, Sonny Tufts, Arturo de Córdova, Jean Heather, Cass Daley, Helen Walker, Diana Lynn, Dorothy Lamour, Howard Da Silva, Billy De Wolfe and Gail Russell
- "His Rocking Horse Ran Away" — (Written by Jimmy Van Heusen & Johnny Burke) played during the Betty Hutton psychoanalyst sketch
- "Murder, He Says" — (Written by Frank Loesser & Jimmy McHugh) played during the Betty Hutton psychoanalyst sketch

== Production ==
Multiple studios attempted to buy the film rights to Duffy's Tavern including Leo Spitz representing Universal Pictures, who offered $250,000 for the screen rights and Jack Moss representing Columbia Pictures. On August 17, 1943, Paramount won the bid for the film rights to Duffy's Tavern for an undisclosed amount, outbidding six other Hollywood studios. The contract that Paramount organised with Gardner was for five films to be produced over five years, all based on the radio show, calling for the first film to be produced within the coming year.

The film was originally meant to be produced by Paul Jones and adapted for the screen by Mac Benoff, a writer from the Duffy's Tavern radio show. Buddy DeSylva assumed general supervision of the film at the start of its production.

Ed Gardner temporarily relocated to Hollywood in March, 1944 to work on the film. Filming was slated to begin on July 1, 1944. Instead filming started on September 25, 1944 and ended on December 15th, 1944.

== Release and reception ==
Duffy's Tavern premiered at the Paramount Theatre on September 5, 1945 and was opened by The Andrews Sisters with Vic Schoen and his Orchestra.

Photoplay Magazine ranked the film as "very good", writing: "A glittering galaxy of Paramount stars that glow and glimmer and entertain like fury. The setting is radio’s famed Duffy’s Tavern with Archie (Ed Gardner) and his usual helpers, Charles Cantor, Eddie Green and Ann Thomas to spread cheer, confusion and massacred English. All the Paramount stars and players (with the exception of Hope) arrive at Duffy’s to help Archie out of a jam, and the abundance of talent plus the melee of fun with Victor Moore staving off the police while Archie introduces the acts makes for a solid hit. Crosby, Betty Hutton, Goddard, Ladd, Lake, Lamour, Bracken and many others hold the spotlight for songs, laughter and sheer hysteria; Eddie Bracken’s take-off on a stand-in is particularly funny. Marjorie Reynolds and Barry Sullivan are pleasantly romantic and everyone just too happy to be about their business of giving you just about the best Paramount show in town."

Film Daily wrote that, "There isn’t much to the story itself, which merely offers an excuse for bringing in such topflighters as Bing Crosby, Betty Hutton, Paulette Goddard, Dorothy Lamour, Eddie Bracken, Veronica Lake, to name but a handful, so that they may do their bit in the manner of guest stars. Most of the big names are introduced at the end in a benefit show staged to raise money to permit Victor Moore to reopen his record factory and put a lot of nice guys back to work."

Variety said that, "Utilizing the four principals of the air show. Archie. Eddie, Finnegan and Miss Duffy, the scripters have turned out a trite story of the quartet involved in a scheme to put some ex-servicemen to work, running the first 15 minutes of the film primarily as a vehicle for one Ed Gardner gag of malapropism after another. What sounds good in a half-hour radio show goes stale on celluloid. Luckily, half-way in the film, the studio has thrown the plot out of the window, concentrating on some rib-tickling burlesque where star after star does a specialty or lets his hair down."
