= International Club Crosby =

Bing Crosby fan club in the U.S.

The International Club Crosby (ICC) was founded in 1936 in the United States and, is, in effect, the "Bing Crosby Fan Club". As such it is the World's longest-running fan club, and is duly recognized by the Guinness Book of World Records. It has some 500 active supporters in major countries around the globe. Monthly Zoom meetings commenced in 2023 and recordings of these can be found on YouTube.

== Activities ==
The club's mission is to perpetuate the memory and the musical legacy of Bing Crosby for the benefit of future generations. The ICC produces the professionally printed 56-page magazine BING which is issued in spring, summer and winter each year.

Also the club has published discographies, books about Bing's TV and radio work, club calendars and has been instrumental in having many Crosby LPs and CDs issued, the most recent being the Through the Years series and General Electric Radio Time.

ICC officials have been heavily involved in various television and radio documentaries about Crosby over the years notably the Landseer Productions television documentary Bing Crosby—The Voice of the Century in 1999, which was shown on the Bravo channel in December 2000, and the KSPS-TV documentary Bing Crosby - Going My Way originally shown in the US in 2003 and subsequently made available on video. Other documentaries with strong ICC help were the BBC Radio 4 documentary Bing Crosby Meets.... broadcast on December 29, 2001, the BBC2-TV documentary Bing On Bing, shown on December 25, 2002 and the Crosby episode in the BBC-TV series Living Famously which was initially shown in the UK in 2003 and in Australia in 2004. The ICC also assisted the BBC Radio 4 team in 2006 with their program about Bing Crosby's appearance at the London Palladium For One Night Only. More recently, ICC members contributed to the PBS documentary Bing Crosby: Rediscovered shown in December 2014.

An annual dinner was held in Leeds, England, from 1966 until 2015 and this was organised by Michael Crampton since its inception. Bing Crosby always sent a taped greetings message outlining his recent activities and his plans for the future until his death in 1977.

The BING magazine website contains a considerable amount of reference material and Lionel Pairpoint's And Here's Bing! radio book, Frans van der Kolff's Songography and Keith Parkinson's The A-Z of Bing's Movies can all be accessed. Malcolm Macfarlane's book Bing Crosby – Day by Day is on the site too. All of these books are being updated as new information arises.

== History and background ==
The earliest known organization of fans devoted to Bing dates to 1930 and was founded and run by Fay E. Zinn of East Orange, New Jersey. Simply called the “Bing Crosby Club”, Fay published a newsletter three or four times per year until 1936 called ‘Crosby Comments’. There was also a Canadian club organised by Peter Blommestyn of Chatham, Ontario in 1935.

In 1936, Cecilia Joseph of North Vassalboro, Maine approached Bing about organizing a club and was given the go ahead with the club being named The Club Crosby. Larry Crosby suggested that a contest be held to name the club’s journal and BINGANG was the winner. Ms. Joseph (known as "Cel") was the first club president. The Canadian club mentioned above then combined with The Club Crosby. Dues were 50 cents per year in the US and 75 cents overseas. The first BINGANG was issued in February 1937 and then distributed at quarterly intervals. It averaged 10 pages per issue. Both Bing Crosby and his brother Larry supported the club with letters and information. In the summer 1939 issue Crosby even penned an editorial called "Keeping Your Feet on the Ground." After World War II, Ruth Ness of Miami, Florida became president. Gord Atkinson founded the Canadian branch of the club in 1947. The following year a branch was formed in Australia with Barbara Doggett of Sydney as president and by 1951 the branch also had members in New Zealand and was known as The Southern Cross branch.

In 1951, Paramount Pictures issued a special souvenir issue of BINGANG in conjunction with the release of the Crosby film Mr. Music. It was distributed in the lobby of the Paramount Theater in New York at the premiere of the film.

In 1957, Rena Albanesi of Bridgeport, Connecticut became president, a post she was to hold for 13 years. She was in regular contact with Crosby by letter and he and his brother Larry kept the club informed about his activities. After her resignation in 1971, her role was taken over by Priscilla Koernig of San Francisco and Pat Sullivan of Chico, California who jointly guided the club until 1980. During their years of leadership, Priscilla and Pat met with Bing Crosby personally during his annual Pro-Am Golf Tournament to interview him for the journal and update the membership on his activities. Pat Sullivan liaised regularly with the Crosby fan club in the UK.

In 1980, Al Sutton of Sacramento. California became the president of the club and editor of BINGANG. By then the journal had become a bi-annual publication of 50+ pages. In 1987, Mark Scrimger of Parma, Michigan, an avid collector of everything Crosby, became president and he was supported by Wayne Martin of Kirkwood, Missouri who acted as vice-president and editor. Under the leadership of Al, Mark and Wayne, BINGANG evolved into a highly regarded publication featuring detailed research on the major aspects of Crosby's life and career. Following some 66 years of publication in various formats, BINGANG was amalgamated with the British-produced BING magazine in 2003, after the merger of the American and British fan clubs to form the International Club Crosby. An index to the articles appearing in BINGANG from 1979 to 2003 can be found on the BING magazine website.

=== United Kingdom clubs ===
The British Bing Club launched in 1950 was originally the brainchild of several Crosby admirers. Arthur Allen and Jean Rainey became the first two co-presidents and they received the blessing of Bing and some practical help from Larry Crosby. The club's first magazine entitled Crosbyana was issued in the summer of 1950.

Spring 1953 brought a surprise to the members as they discovered that their club was now called The Crosby Society as it was felt that the club's initials of BBC might cause confusion with another organisation. The magazine was then called Crosby Post. In 1954, financial problems had almost put the club out of existence but it was relaunched in November 1954 as The British Crosby Society and its magazine remained as Crosby Post. The Active Co-Presidents were Dorothy Hardiman and Jean Rainey with Frank Murphy's name starting to come to the fore. Frank had joined the club in December 1950 and went on to hold every position in the club. By 1957 Frank was Active Co-President with Dorothy Hardiman and the club had acquired an Irish branch whose secretary was Johnny Hopkins. The American Correspondent was Pat Sullivan. In 1957 the dream of a complete discography of Bing's records was launched by the club for the first time and this was to be the now much sought after 'The Road to Bing Crosby.'

The British fan club was reorganized in 1965 as the International Crosby Circle with an improved magazine called "BING," which was edited initially by Frank Murphy, followed by John Bassett in 1971, and Reg Bristo from 1975 to 1989.

Reg had firm opinions on most subjects but his enthusiasm leaped from the pages of the magazine. He presided over the exciting years of 1975 to 1977 when Bing was so active in the UK. Whilst Les Gaylor and Bert Bishop contributed to the magazine in handsome measure, Reg wrote most of the rest of the contents. He duplicated the magazine (which was published at quarterly intervals), posted it, acted as Secretary and Treasurer as well as issuing club cassettes to raise funds. Looking back now, it is difficult to know how he did it. Membership increased dramatically in the first few years he was in the chair because of Bing's higher profile and for the first time, the club managed to have its details on the covers of Bing's LPs. Reg carried the weight of the club for almost twenty years until ill health caused him to hand over the reins in 1989.

After some 25 years of operation as a traditional fan club, the British International Crosby Circle was significantly reorganized in 1989 following Reg Bristo's resignation under a new management team, with Michael Crampton as Secretary/Treasurer of the club and Ken Crossland, and later Malcolm Macfarlane, as editor of a revamped "BING" magazine rededicated principally toward scholarly research about Bing Crosby's life and career.

Following the merger with the American Club Crosby in 2003, the now worldwide organization also has focused on the publication of books about Bing Crosby's many accomplishments and the reissuance of his recordings, films and radio and television programs. BING magazine today is regarded as an essential source of information to support the club's primary goal of the preservation of Bing Crosby's memory and musical legacy.

=== The Hofstra Conference ===
Representatives of Club Crosby and the International Crosby Circle came together under the leadership of Wig Wiggins to make substantial contributions to a major conference titled Bing! Crosby and American Culture held at Hofstra University in Hempstead, New York on November 14–16, 2002. Many of the papers presented are contained in the book Going My Way - Bing Crosby and American Culture. Some notable panellists at the conference included Kathryn Crosby, Ken Barnes, Buddy Bregman, Will Friedwald, Gary Giddins, Nick Perito, Margaret Whiting, Ervin Drake, Joe Bushkin, Skitch Henderson and Joe Franklin.

The two clubs also played a prominent part in the centenary celebrations of Crosby's birth held at Gonzaga University in May 2003. This event was attended by Kathryn Crosby, Ken Barnes, Buddy Bregman, Will Friedwald, Gary Giddins, Rich Little, Frank Sinatra, Jr. and many members of the Crosby family.

=== Merger ===
In 2002, it had been suggested that the best way forward might be for the two main Crosby clubs to merge. A year-long consideration of this suggestion took place after private discussions at the Hofstra Conference. It was eventually agreed that the American Club Crosby would merge with the International Crosby Circle and this was finalized in 2003. The new combined club was named The International Club Crosby and the club magazine was to be simply named BING. Wayne Martin worked closely with Malcolm Macfarlane for the first year and then Wayne handed over his role to Greg Van Beek of West Bend, Wisconsin who became American Co-editor. Anton Garcia-Fernandez took over from Greg Van Beek in 2016. Kathryn Crosby acted as president until her death in 2024.

== Present officers ==
Honorary Members: Harry Crosby – Mary Crosby Brodka – Nathaniel Crosby – Phillip Crosby, Jr. – Pat Boone – Rory Burke – Nick Clooney – Michael Feinstein – Rich Little

Magazine Editor: Malcolm Macfarlane
Secretary and Treasurer: Michael Crampton
American Co-Editor: Anton Garcia-Fernandez
American Vice President: Perry Huntoon
Australian / New Zealand Representative: David Currington
