= Lindsay Crosby =

American actor and singer (1938–1989)

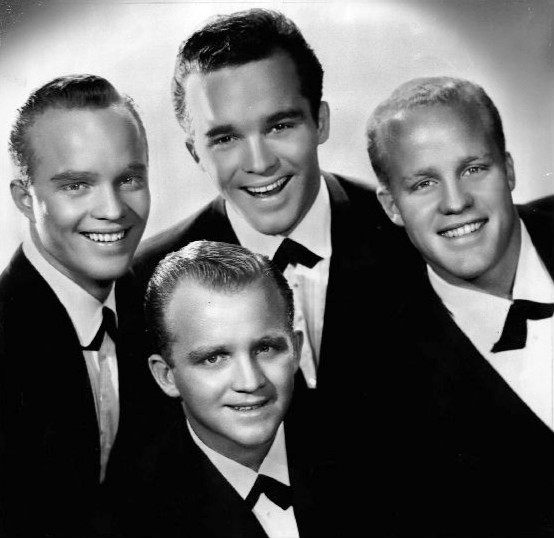
- The four Crosby brothers-(L-R) Dennis, Gary, Lindsay and Phillip in 1959
- Born: Lindsay Harry Crosby; January 5, 1938; Los Angeles, California, U.S.
- Died: December 11, 1989 (aged 51); Calabasas, California, U.S.
- Resting place: Holy Cross Cemetery, Culver City, California, U.S.
- Spouses: Barbara D. Fredrickson (m. 1960; div. 1963) Janet Sue Schwartze (m. 1966; div. 1967) Susan Marlin (m. 1968)
- Children: 5
- Parent(s): Bing Crosby; Dixie Lee
- Relatives: Gary Crosby (brother); Phillip Crosby (brother); Dennis Crosby (brother); Harry Crosby III (half-brother); Mary Crosby (half-sister); Nathaniel Crosby (half-brother); Larry Crosby (uncle); Bob Crosby (uncle); Chris Crosby (cousin); Denise Crosby (niece)

Lindsay Harry Crosby (January 5, 1938 – December 11, 1989) was an American actor and singer. He was the youngest of four sons from Bing Crosby's first marriage to Dixie Lee, his older brothers being Gary and twins Phillip and Dennis. Lindsay began his career singing alongside his three brothers and his father. He was remembered by his friends for having a laid-back, clever wit like his father.

== Early life ==
Lindsay Crosby was born in Los Angeles, California and named after his father's closest friend and horse racing partner, Lindsay Howard.

He was educated at Loyola High School, Los Angeles. After graduating in 1956, he enrolled at Williams College, Williamstown, Massachusetts but left after only one semester. He then joined the Army. After his discharge in February 1959, he formed a vocal group with his brothers. When he was 21 in 1959, Lindsay inherited $200,000, equivalent to $2,209,000 in 2025, from his late mother's trust.

== Singing career ==
Lindsay had sung with his brothers on their father's radio shows, and they participated in a record with Bing in 1950 called "A Crosby Christmas" which charted at number 22 in the Billboard lists in December 1950. In 1951, the thirteen year old Lindsay made two solo records for Decca accompanied by John Scott Trotter and his Orchestra – "That's What I Want for Christmas" (Decca 27812) and "Dear Mister Santa Claus" (Decca).

In 1955 and 1956, he made many appearances on his father's radio show. On October 13, 1957, he had a guest spot on a major TV special called The Edsel Show, singing "In the Middle of an Island". Whilst still in the Army, he signed a record contract with RCA-Victor on February 25, 1958, and he made a number of records for them.

He performed with his brothers Gary, Dennis, and Phillip Crosby as the Crosby Brothers during the late 1950s and early 60s, in nightclubs and on television. They were featured on the cover of Life on September 15, 1958. An appearance on The Phil Silvers Show on November 14, 1958, followed, and they made their debut as a singing group at Tucson, Arizona in 1959. Moving on to the Chez Paree, Chicago, in June 1959, they earned a good review from Variety which said:

CROSBY BROS. Chez Paree, Chicago. Songs 58 Mins. Bing Crosby's four sons are launched on the cabaret scene in high style. The frères – Gary, Phillip, Dennis and Lindsay – have a superlative act that is likely to abash those skeptics who surmised the boys would trade merely on the lustrous family name.

They continued to perform successfully at locations such as the Sahara in Las Vegas and the El Morocco nightclub in Montreal. However, after one of their performances at El Morocco in December 1959, the boys fought among themselves, and Gary Crosby left the group.

Phillip, Dennis, and Lindsay continued without Gary and they were given useful exposure on the Bing Crosby Show seen on ABC-TV on February 29, 1960. Bing took the place of Gary to sing "Joshua Fit the Battle of Jericho" with his sons, who also sang two other songs themselves. In April 1960, they made their first LP for their father's company, Project Records, which was released by MGM Records and was well received.

The Crosby Brothers – Dennis – Philip – Lindsay Crosby (MGM); "Dinah" (Mills*), a hip version of the oldie, makes a promising disk bow for this trio of Bing Crosby offspring. "The Green Grass Grows All Around" (Marfran*) is a bright ensemble of this folk tune.

To promote the album, the brothers appeared on the I've Got a Secret show, and taught the panel how to lip-sync to "I Can't Give You Anything but Love."

Starting at the Desert Inn in Las Vegas and continuing for the next two years, the three men performed as The Crosby Brothers at venues such as the Chi Chi in Palm Springs, The Venetian Room at the Fairmont Hotel in San Francisco, and the Latin Quarter nightclub in New York. During their stay at the Latin Quarter, they appeared on the What's My Line? TV show on May 14, 1961.

On television, the Crosby Brothers starred on several high-profile shows such as Perry Como's Kraft Music Hall (twice), The Ed Sullivan Show (four times) and the Bing Crosby Show (twice).

The Crosby Brothers act folded, when Lindsay Crosby had a breakdown in July 1962, in Juarez, Mexico. Earlier in the year, Lindsay's wife Barbara Frederickson, who was eight months pregnant, attempted suicide and was rushed unconscious into St. Joseph Hospital, Burbank. She was released from the hospital on February 20. A few days later she gave birth prematurely to a one and one-half pound baby boy, who died one hour after delivery. Lindsay, who was in Miami, suffered feelings of guilt which necessitated lengthy psychological treatment, including being hospitalized for some time. He and Frederickson divorced shortly afterwards.

In the years after his nervous breakdown, he went through two divorces and was arrested several times for drunk driving and battery. He never held a steady job, and his own attempts at an entertainment career, including appearances in such low-budget films as "The Glory Stompers" and "Scream Free!" were not successful.

== Death ==
Bing Crosby said in a 1959 interview, "I guess I didn't do very well bringing my boys up. I think I failed them by giving them too much work and discipline, too much money, and too little time and attention. But I did my best and so did their mother." Lindsay Crosby responded by saying

"I don't know how our dad could feel he's failed us as a father. Reading that he had said that in an interview really shook me up. I only hope someday that I can give my son a tenth of what Dad has given us. And that I can rate any part of the admiration we've always felt for him. That's why it hurt so much to see him knocking himself in print. Taking himself apart and saying he punished us too much, that he was too strict with us, that he made us work too hard, that he spent too little time with us. That really shook me up."

Heavy drinking and emotional problems took their toll. Crosby died on December 11, 1989, from a self-inflicted rifle shot to the head. He was 51. A family spokeswoman said Crosby shot himself dead in an apartment in the Las Virgenes area of Calabasas, California. Another brother, Dennis, died by suicide two years later.

== Family ==
- Brother of Gary and twins Phillip and Dennis Crosby
- Half-sibling of Harry Crosby, Nathaniel Crosby and Mary Crosby
- Nephew of Larry Crosby and bandleader Bob Crosby
- Cousin of Chris Crosby (singer)
- Uncle of Denise Crosby

== Discography ==
=== Albums ===
- A Crosby Christmas (EP) – with Dennis Crosby, Phillip Crosby, Gary Crosby and Bing Crosby (1950)

The Crosby Brothers

- Presenting the Crosby Bros. (MGM, 1961)

=== Singles ===
- "That's What I Want for Christmas" (1951)
- "Dear Mister Santa Claus" (1951)
- "Friendship Ring" (1958)
- "Why-Oh-You (Y.O.U.)" (1958)
- "Ding Ding" (1958)
- "One Chocolate Soda with Two Straws" (1958)
- "Christmas Won't Be the Same" (1965)
- "Old Friends of Mine" (1965)

== Filmography ==
Year	Title	Role	Notes
1945	Out of This World	Himself	
1945	Duffy's Tavern	Himself	
1962	Sergeants 3	Pvt. Wills	
1967	The Glory Stompers	Monk	
1969	Scream Free!	Narcotics officer	
1970	The Girls from Thunder Strip		
1970	Bigfoot	Wheels	
1971	Outlaw Riders	Lee	
1972	The Mechanic	Policeman	
1973	Santee	Horn	
1975	Murph the Surf	S.A. Thomas	
1987	Code Name Zebra	Police Sergeant	(final film role)
