= The Crosby Brothers =

American singing group

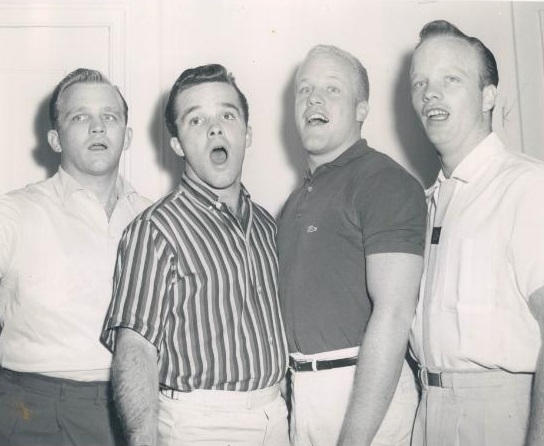
The Crosby Brothers in 1959 (left to right: Gary, Lindsay, Phillip and Dennis)

The Crosby Brothers was an American harmony singing group who were popular in nightclubs and on television during the 1950s and 1960s.

They were the four sons of the popular singer Bing Crosby from his first marriage to the singer and actress Dixie Lee.

- Gary Crosby (1933–1995)
- Dennis Crosby (1934–1991)
- Phillip Crosby (1934–2004)
- Lindsay Crosby (1938–1989)

== Singing career ==
The boys sang on their father's radio shows and made a record with Bing on September 5, 1950, called "A Crosby Christmas" which charted at number 22 in the Billboard lists in December 1950. In 1958, the four brothers decided to form a vocal group called The Crosby Brothers. They were featured on the cover of Life on September 15, 1958. An appearance on The Phil Silvers Show on November 14, 1958, followed, and they made their debut as a singing group at Tucson, Arizona, in 1959. Moving on to the Chez Paree Chicago nightclub in June 1959, they earned a good review from Variety, which said "CROSBY BROS. Chez Paree, Chicago. Songs 58 Mins. Bing Crosby's four sons are launched on the cabaret scene in high style. The frères – Gary, Phillip, Dennis and Lindsay – have a superlative act that is likely to abash those skeptics who surmised the boys would trade merely on the lustrous family name." They continued to perform successfully at locations such as the Sahara in Las Vegas and the El Morocco nightclub in Montreal. However, after one of their performances at El Morocco in December 1959, the boys fought among themselves and Gary Crosby left the group.

Phillip, Dennis, and Lindsay continued without Gary and they were given useful exposure on the Bing Crosby Show seen on ABC-TV on February 29, 1960. Bing took the place of Gary to sing "Joshua Fit the Battle of Jericho" with his sons, who also sang two other songs themselves. They made their first LP for their father's company, Project Records, in April 1960, which was released by MGM Records and was well received. "The Crosby Brothers – Dennis – Philip – Lindsay Crosby (MGM); 'Dinah' (Mills*), a hip version of the oldie, makes a promising disk bow for this trio of Bing Crosby offspring. 'The Green Grass Grows All Around' (Marfran*) is a bright ensemble of this folk tune". To promote the album, the brothers appeared on the I've Got a Secret show and taught the panel how to lip-sync to "I Can't Give You Anything but Love, Baby".

Starting at the Desert Inn in Las Vegas and continuing for the next two years, the three men enjoyed useful success as the Crosby Brothers at venues such as the Chi Chi in Palm Springs, The Venetian room at the Fairmont in San Francisco, and the Latin Quarter in New York. During their stay at the Latin Quarter, they appeared on the What's My Line? TV show on May 14, 1961.

On television, the Crosby Brothers starred on several high-profile shows such as Perry Como's Kraft Music Hall (twice), The Ed Sullivan Show (four times) and of course the Bing Crosby Show (twice).

The Crosby Brothers act folded, however, when Lindsay Crosby had a breakdown in July 1962 in Juarez, Mexico. Lindsay had to be hospitalized for some time. Eventually, Phillip decided to embark on a solo career, and he had parts in several films, as well as one of the Ben Casey episodes. He also guest-starred on The Bob Hope Christmas Special on January 17, 1964. Lindsay and Dennis left show business.

== Discography ==
=== Singles ===
- "Dinah" (1961)
- "The Green Grass Grows All Around" (1961)
- "Tennessee Twist" (1961)
- "A Little Bitty Tear" (1961)
- "The Call of Summer" (1961)
- "Say Your Heart Belongs to a Soldier" (1961)

=== Albums ===
- A Crosby Christmas (EP) – with Bing Crosby (1950; not as a vocal group)
- Presenting the Crosby Bros. (1961)
