= Gary Crosby (actor) =

American actor and singer (1933–1995)

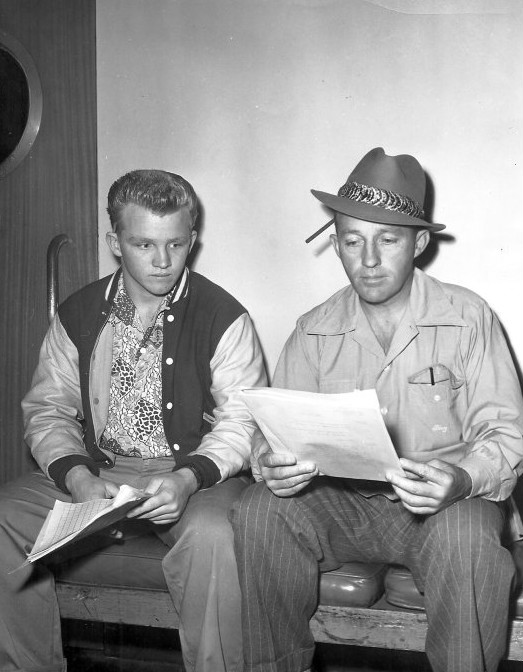
- Crosby (left) with his father Bing in 1951
- Born: Gary Evan Crosby; June 27, 1933; Los Angeles, California, U.S.
- Died: August 24, 1995 (aged 62); Burbank, California, U.S.
- Resting place: Forest Lawn Memorial Park
- Occupations: Actor, singer
- Years active: 1945–1995
- Spouses: Barbara Cosentino (m. 1960; div. 1981); Andrea Claudio (m. 1981, divorced); Carol Crosby (div. 1995)
- Children: 1
- Parents: Bing Crosby; Dixie Lee
- Relatives: Phillip Crosby (brother); Dennis Crosby (brother); Lindsay Crosby (brother); Harry Crosby III (half-brother); Mary Crosby (half-sister); Nathaniel Crosby (half-brother); Larry Crosby (uncle); Bob Crosby (uncle); Chris Crosby (cousin); Denise Crosby (niece)

Gary Evan Crosby (June 27, 1933 – August 24, 1995) was an American actor and singer. His parents were Bing Crosby (of whom he wrote a highly critical memoir), and the singer and actress Dixie Lee.

== Biography ==
Gary Crosby was born in Los Angeles, California, and attended Stanford University. He entered the entertainment business and performed in a harmony singing group, the Crosby Brothers, with his three brothers, Philip, Lindsay, and Dennis, during the 1940s, 1950s, and 1960s. As a teenager, he duetted with his father on two songs, "Sam's Song" and "Play a Simple Melody", which became the first double-sided gold record in history. He also recorded duets with Louis Armstrong and at least one 45-single with Sammy Davis Jr. He also performed on several variety programs, including ABC's The Pat Boone Chevy Showroom and NBC's The Ford Show, Starring Tennessee Ernie Ford.

=== Radio star ===
In the mid-1950s, he had his own radio program, The Gary Crosby Show, on CBS. The musical variety program was to debut June 6, 1954, as a summer replacement for Bing Crosby's show, but was postponed to June 13 following Crosby's injury in an automobile accident.

=== Actor ===
As an actor, Crosby appeared in many television programs. On March 20, 1955, he appeared on The Jack Benny Program Season 5, Episode 13. Later, he was briefly under contract to 20th Century-Fox in the late 1950s. He appeared in a number of supporting roles for the studio, normally comedies in which Crosby played a soldier: Mardi Gras (1958) with Pat Boone; Holiday for Lovers (1959), as Carol Lynley's love interest; A Private's Affair (1959), with Sal Mineo; The Right Approach (1961) with Frankie Vaughan.

He is perhaps best remembered for his recurring roles as Eddie the scheming bellhop on The Bill Dana Show and Officer Ed Wells on NBC's Adam-12 from 1968 to 1975, as well as appearances on several other shows produced by Jack Webb's Mark VII Limited (including an episode of Dragnet 1969 and five episodes of Emergency!). In addition to the aforementioned, he also appeared in three episodes of The Rockford Files. Crosby appeared in In the Heat of the Night in the episode "When The Music Stopped" (1992). He played Mal Tabert, the manager of a singer played by Robert Goulet, who shoots and kills a stalker.

Crosby performed in the series premiere of The Hollywood Palace hosted by his father on January 4, 1964.

In 1964, Crosby appeared in the last filmed episode of The Twilight Zone. Entitled "Come Wander with Me", the episode co-starred Bonnie Beecher (in her very first role) and was directed by Richard Donner.

In 1965, he made a guest appearance on Perry Mason as singer Jazbo Williams in "The Case of the Frustrated Folk Singer". He appeared in Girl Happy (1965), starring Elvis Presley, with whom he had been stationed in the Army in Germany.

Gary also made an appearance in his father's 1964 sitcom, The Bing Crosby Show, in the second episode as a lookalike. In the 1970s, he appeared occasionally on game shows such as Match Game and Tattletales as a guest panelist. He married and divorced three times; he had one stepchild as a result.

== Memoir ==
In 1983, six years after his father's death, Crosby published an autobiography, Going My Own Way, which revealed the effects of his alcoholism and his difficult childhood as a result of his mother's alcoholism and his father's alleged emotional and physical abuse.

Shortly before Gary's book was published, his brother Lindsay said, "I'm glad [Gary] did it. I hope it clears up a lot of the old lies and rumors." Unlike Gary, Lindsay stated that he preferred to remember "all the good things I did with my dad and forget the times that were rough".

Bing's younger brother, jazz bandleader and singer Bob Crosby, recalled at the time of Gary's revelations that Bing was a "disciplinarian", as their mother and father had been. He added, "We were brought up that way." In an interview for the same article, Gary clarified that Bing "was like a lot of fathers of that time. He was not out to be vicious, to beat children for his kicks."

The author of the most recent biography on Bing Crosby, Gary Giddins, said that Gary Crosby's memoir is not reliable on many instances and cannot be trusted on the abuse stories.

Gary Crosby's adopted son, Steven, stated in a 2003 interview:

In the early years, I think, like any family you are going to butt heads with your mom, your dad and your brothers and sisters. I think there was some father-son stuff that everyone has. The book was, I think, an attempt of my dad to come to grips with some things in his life.

== Death ==
Gary Crosby died of lung cancer in Burbank, California, in 1995, and is interred at Forest Lawn-Hollywood Hills Cemetery.

== Family relations ==
- Brother of Phillip and Dennis (twins) and Lindsay Crosby
- Half-brother of Harry Crosby, Nathaniel Crosby and Mary Crosby
- Nephew of the bandleader Bob Crosby
- Cousin of Chris Crosby
- Uncle of Denise Crosby

== Discography ==
=== Singles ===
- "Play a Simple Melody" with Bing Crosby (1950)
- "Sam's Song" with Bing Crosby (1950)
- "When You and I Were Young Maggie" with Bing Crosby (1951)
- "Moonlight Bay" with Bing Crosby (1951)
- "Down by the Riverside" with Bing Crosby (1953)
- "What a Little Moonlight Can Do" with Bing Crosby (1953)
- "Cornbelt Symphony" with Bing Crosby (1954)
- "The Call of the South" with Bing Crosby (1954)
- "Mambo in the Moonlight" (1954)
- "Got My Eyes On You" (1954)
- "Palsy Walsy" (1954)
- "Loop-De-Loop Mambo" (1954)
- "There's a Small Hotel" (1954)
- "Ready Willing and Able" (1954)
- "Yaller Yaller Gold" (1955)
- "Give Me a Band and My Baby" (1955)
- "Ko Ko Mo (I Love You So)" with Louis Armstrong (1955)
- "Struttin' with Some Barbecue" with Louis Armstrong (1955)
- "Beat Me Daddy Eight to the Bar" with Sammy Davis Jr. (1955)
- "Ac-Cent-Tchu-Ate the Positive" with Sammy Davis Jr. (1955)
- "Truly" (1955)
- "Ayuh Ayuh" (1955)
- "Mississippi Pecan Pie" (1955)
- "His and Hers" (1955)
- "Easy Street" with Louis Armstrong (1956)
- "Lazy Bones" with Louis Armstrong (1956)
- "Judy, Judy" (1958)
- "Cheatin' On Me" (1958)
- "Sentimental Journey" (1959)
- "After the Lights Go Down Low" (1959)
- "The Happy Bachelor" (1959)
- "This Little Girl Of Mine" (1959)
- "Yellow Bird" (1960)
- "High Hill Country" (1960)
- "You're Nobody till Somebody Loves You" (1961)
- "Baby Won't You Please Come Home" (1961)
- "That's Alright Baby" (1962)
- "Who" (1962)
- "Town Girl" (1967)
- "I'm Gonna Call My Baby" (1967)
- "Noah Found Grace In The Eyes Of The Lord" with Bill Thompson's Dreamers
- "Get A Load O' Me"

=== Albums ===
- A Crosby Christmas (EP) – with Dennis Crosby, Phillip Crosby, Lindsay Crosby and Bing Crosby (1950)
- Gary Crosby and Friend (EP) – with Bing Crosby (1953)
- Gary Crosby (1957)
- Judy, Judy (EP) (1958)
- Rocking the Blues (EP) (1959)
- Breezin' Along (EP) (1959)
- Belts The Blues (1959)
- The Happy Bachelor (1960)
- Dos billetes Para Paris (EP) – with Joey Dee and Jeri Lynne Fraser (1962)

== Filmography ==
- Out of This World (1945)
- The Jack Benny Program (TV series) (1955)
- Mardi Gras (1958)
- Holiday for Lovers (1959)
- A Private's Affair (1959)
- The Right Approach (1961)
- Battle at Bloody Beach (1961)
- Two Tickets to Paris (1962)
- Operation Bikini (1963)
- The Twilight Zone, "Come Wander with Me" (1964)
- Girl Happy (1965)
- Perry Mason, "The Case of The Frustrated Folk Singer" (1965)
- Wings of Fire (1967)
- The Flying Nun, Season 3 Episode 3 (1969)
- Mayberry RFD, "The Moon Rocks" (1971)
- Justin Morgan Had a Horse (1972)
- Sandcastles (1972)
- Adam-12, various episodes
- Emergency!, various episodes
- Partners in Crime (1973)
- The Bionic Woman, "Bionic Beauty" (1976)
- Wonder Woman, "Light-Fingered Lady" (1978)
- Three on a Date (1978)
- Project U.F.O., "Sighting 4003: The Fremont Incident" (1978)
- Project U.F.O., "Sighting 4022: The Camouflage Incident" (1978)
- Vega$, (1980)
- Hunter, various episodes
- The Night Stalker (1987)
- Chill Factor (1989)
- In the Heat of the Night, "When The Music Stopped" (1992)

== Bibliography ==
- Crosby, Gary; Firestone, Ross (1983). Going My Own Way. Doubleday. ISBN 978-0385170550.
