= Chris Crosby =

Chris Crosby may refer to:

- Chris Crosby (singer) (born 1950s), American singer
- Chris Crosby (comics) (born 1977), co-founder of Keenspot
