= Cheer Up and Smile =

1930 film

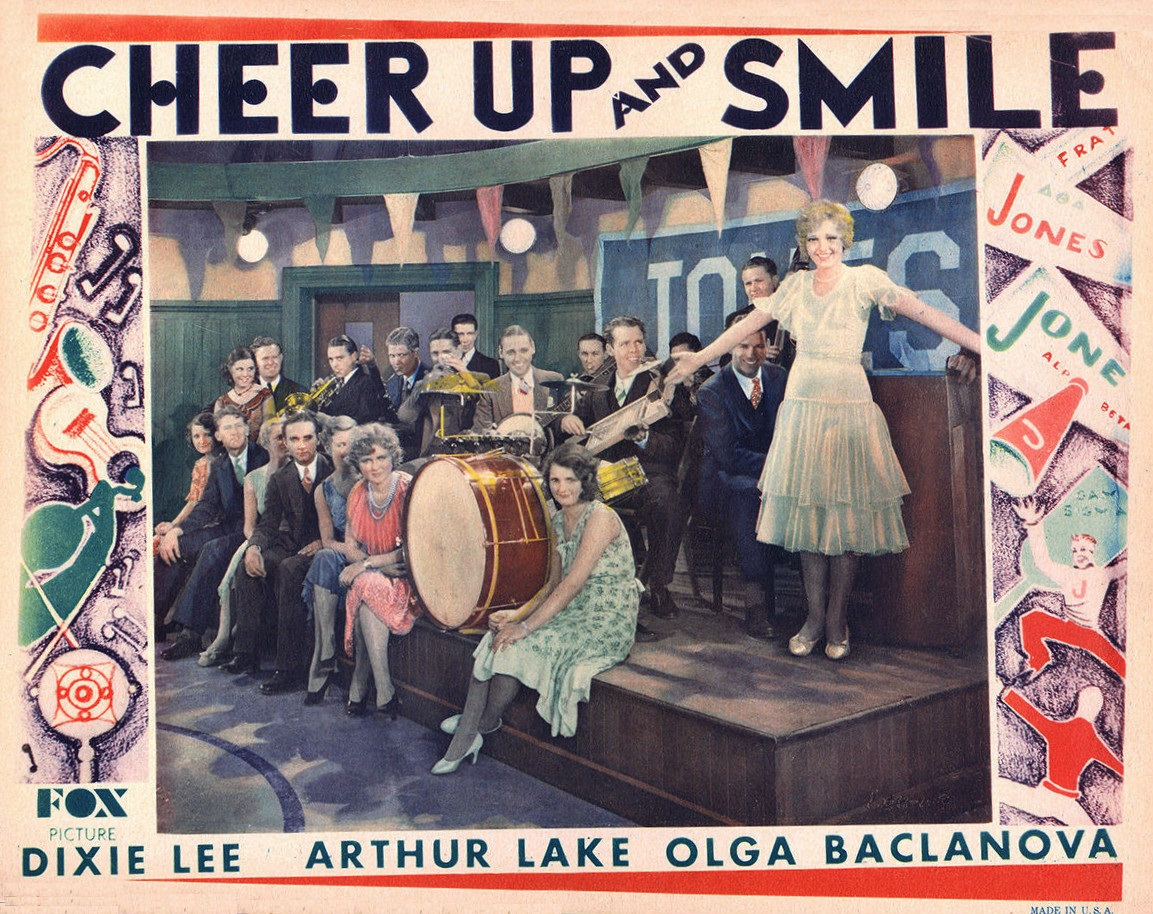
- Lobby card
- Directed by: Sidney Lanfield
- Written by: Richard Connell (story); Howard J. Green
- Produced by: Al Rockett
- Starring: Arthur Lake; Dixie Lee; Olga Baclanova
- Cinematography: Joseph A. Valentine
- Edited by: Ralph Dietrich
- Distributed by: Fox Film Corporation
- Release date: November 1930
- Running time: 76 min.
- Country: United States
- Language: English

Cheer Up and Smile is a 1930 American pre-Code musical film directed by Sidney Lanfield. The film starred Arthur Lake, Dixie Lee and Olga Baclanova and a 23-year-old John Wayne had a minor uncredited role.

== Cast ==
- Arthur Lake as Eddie Fripp
- Dixie Lee as Margie
- Olga Baclanova as Yvonne
- "Whispering" Jack Smith as himself
- Johnny Arthur as Andy
- Charles Judels as Pierre
- John Darrow as Tom
- Sumner Getchell as Paul
- Franklin Pangborn as Professor
- Buddy Messinger as Donald

== Production notes ==
The role played by Arthur Lake had originally been written for "Whispering" Jack Smith.

== See also ==
- List of American films of 1930
