= The Private History of a Campaign That Failed =

Sketch by Mark Twain

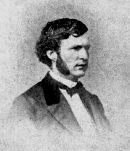
Mark Twain in 1863

"The Private History of a Campaign that Failed" is one of Mark Twain's sketches (1885), a short, highly fictionalized memoir of his two-week stint in the pro-Confederate Missouri State Guard. It takes place in Marion County, Missouri, and is about a group of inexperienced militiamen, the Marion Rangers, who end up killing a stranger in panic. In 1887, he claimed before Union veterans that he had been in one battle in which a stranger had been killed in the summer of 1861. In fact, Twain saw no action; he quipped that during his service he spent more time retreating while being hunted than fighting.

== Television film ==
The Private History of a Campaign That Failed
- Written by: Philip H. Reisman Jr.
- Directed by: Peter H. Hunt
- Starring: Edward Herrmann; Pat Hingle; Joseph Adams; Harry Crosby; Kelly Pease
- Music by: William P. Perry
- Country of origin: United States
- Original language: English

Production
- Producer: Peter H. Hunt
- Cinematography: Walter Lassally
- Editor: Herbert H. Dow
- Running time: 89 minutes
- Production companies: The Great Amwell Company; Nebraska Educational Television

Original release
- Network: PBS
- Release: April 6, 1981

In 1981, a made-for-television film adaptation of The Private History of a Campaign that Failed was broadcast on PBS starring Edward Herrmann, Pat Hingle, Joseph Adams, Harry Crosby and Kelly Pease. The film also adapts Twain's short story "The War Prayer".

=== Cast ===
- Edward Herrmann as The Stranger
- Pat Hingle as Col. Ralls
- Joseph Adams as Capt. Tom Lyman
- Harry Crosby as Cpl. Ed Stevens
- Kelly Pease as Cab
- Gary McCleery as Second Lieutenant
- Roy Cockrum as Sgt. Bowers
