= Out of This World (1945 film) =

1945 film directed by Hal Walker

- Theatrical poster
- Directed by: Hal Walker
- Screenplay by: Walter DeLeon and Arthur Phillips
- Based on: Stories by Elizabeth Meehan and Sam Coslow
- Produced by: Sam Coslow (associate producer)
- Starring: Eddie Bracken; Veronica Lake; Diana Lynn; Cass Daley
- Cinematography: Stuart Thompson, A.S.C.
- Edited by: Stuart Gilmore (editorial supervision)
- Music by: Victor Young (music direction)
- Production company: Paramount Pictures
- Distributed by: Paramount Pictures
- Release date: July 13, 1945
- Running time: 96 minutes
- Country: United States
- Language: English

Out of This World is a 1945 American romantic comedy film directed by Hal Walker and starring Eddie Bracken, Veronica Lake and Diana Lynn. The picture was a satire on the Frank Sinatra "bobby soxer" cult.

== Plot ==
Betty Miller and her Sirens are a struggling all-female band who play at a benefit for an orphanage. The following act is shy Western Union messenger Herbie Fenton, who stuns Betty with his amazing singing voice, performing "Out of This World". In the audience are Bing Crosby's four sons, even though they are not orphans (due to "Dad and his horses"); they recognize the voice right away. Dorothy Dodge, secretary to the orphanage's main benefactor, faints during his performance. A photo of Herbie holding Dorothy up is published in Life magazine.

The next day, Betty gets a much-needed job offer in New York, but it stipulates she must bring her male singer: Herbie. She talks him into signing an exclusive contract for fifty dollars per week, an easy task as he is smitten with her. They do not have enough for train fare to New York, but Dorothy gives Betty the money ... in exchange for 25% of Herbie. Then the hotel manager wants his bill paid, so the girls have to sell more shares of the contract. On the train, Betty is horrified to discover they have sold another 100% of Herbie. Betty can only hope that Herbie flops, but she doesn't know that Dorothy hires bobby soxers to scream and swoon at his performance. Later, Betty confides to Herbie that she wants to marry either someone handsome or one with $100,000, explaining that her mother married a vaudeville actor and she wants the security her mother never had.

On The Crawford Glamour Hour radio show, Herbie sings "I'd Rather Be Me", and the bobby soxers do their job so well that J. C. Crawford, the show's sponsor, pressures Betty into signing a contract ($750 a week for the orchestra and $1000 for Herbie), reminding her that he has an exclusive option on her band.

On the train after a performance, Herbie tells Betty he loves her, and he is now worth $100,000. She tells him she feels the same, but asks him to propose later, after she gets something straightened out. She summons all the contract shareholders to New York. When Herbie finds out Betty's financial dealings, he believes Betty lied about everything and quits.

Crawford has arranged a big charity event, to be broadcast nationwide (to 50,000,000 potential customers) and featuring Herbie. When he finds out that Herbie refuses to perform, he threatens to sue everyone involved. The other shareholders sell out to Dorothy, who then sells all of Herbie to Crawford for a hefty prof|it. Meanwhile, Betty sees to it that Herbie catches a cold, so he has an excuse not to sing at the event. Crawford does not believe Herbie has lost his voice, so to keep Betty out of jail, Herbie comes up with the idea to lip sync to a recording. Afterward, Dorothy points out that Betty is 19 and, as a minor, cannot be party to a contract.

In one of the last numbers at the event, five noted orchestra leader-pianists, Carmen Cavallaro, Ted Fiorito, Henry King, Ray Noble and Joe Reichman, show off their piano talents.

== Cast ==
- Eddie Bracken as Herbie Fenton
- Veronica Lake as Dorothy Dodge
- Diana Lynn as Betty Miller
- Cass Daley as Fanny
- Parkyakarkus as Gus Palukas
- Donald MacBride as J. C. Crawford
- Florence Bates as Harriet Pringle
- Gary, Phillip, Dennis and Lin Crosby
  as Bing's Kids in Audience
- "The Glamourette Quartette":
  - Olga San Juan
  - Nancy Porter
  - Audrey Young
  - Carol Deere
- "The Piano–Maestros":
  - Carmen Cavallaro
  - Ted Fiorito
  - Henry King
  - Ray Noble
  - Joe Reichman

Uncredited (in order of appearance)
Gloria Saunders	Vicky Kelly, singer in Betty Miller's orchestra
Betty Walker	Guitarist in Betty's orchestra
Mabel Paige	Mrs. Robbins, orphanage supervisor who presents Betty's orchestra
Charles Smith	Charlie Briggs, photographer at orphanage who takes photo of Herbie
Nell Craig	Audience member listening to Herbie sing
Lorraine Krueger	Maizie, blonde to whom Charlie shows LIFE with his photo of Herbie
Don Barclay	Hotel detective watching Betty and Herbie ride up and down in elevator
Inez Palange	Mrs. Palukas, Gus Palukas' wife who sees him buy a share of Herbie
Irving Bacon	Irving Krunk, telegraph office proprietor who buys a share of Herbie
Virginia Sale	Spinster friend of the Pringle sisters
Esther Dale	Abbie Pringle, Harriet Pringle's sister who buys a share of Herbie
Betty Farrington	Passenger on the train taking Betty and Herbie to New York
James Flavin	Policeman barging with a gun into the audition
Don Wilson	Radio announcer for Herbie's debut performance
Charles Williams	Joe Welch, production assistant on J. C. Crawford's radio program
Lal Chand Mehra	Hindu announcer proclaiming worldwide radio stardom for Herbie
Michael Visaroff	Russian announcer proclaiming worldwide radio stardom for Herbie
Sammee Tong	Chinese announcer proclaiming worldwide radio stardom for Herbie
Anna Chandler	One of three women in sponsor J. C. Crawford's "Frère Jacques" jingle
Leon Belasco	Radio comedian on J. C. Crawford's radio program
Milton Kibbee	Bald-headed member of radio studio audience who restrains his wife
Frank Darien	Elderly messenger boy who delivers telegram to Herbie and exits singing
Ralph Dunn	Policeman controlling crowd in front of theater after Herbie's performance
Minerva Urecal	Taxi driver for Betty and Herbie
Charles R. Moore	Pullman porter from whom Betty requests blank telegram forms
Selmer Jackson	Physician who examines Herbie's throat and declares him to be in shock
George McKay	Stage manager for J. C. Crawford's radio program
Tom Fadden	Electricity stagehand who brings his two daughters to see Herbie

== Production ==
The film was originally known as Divided by Three. It was meant to star Eddie Bracken and Betty Hutton after their success in Miracle of Morgan's Creek. However, Hutton was then assigned to the film California, so her role was assigned to Diana Lynn, who had played her younger sister in Miracle of Morgan's Creek.

Veronica Lake was then brought in to play the third lead. It was a step down for Lake, who had been one of Paramount's biggest stars. Hedda Hopper wrote that Paramount gave her the part supporting Lynn because "Lake clipped her own wings in her Boston bond appearance... It's lucky for Lake, after Boston, that she isn't out of pictures."

Filming started in June 1944.

== Reception ==
Bosley Crowther of The New York Times wrote, "Imagine a shy young singer with Eddie Bracken’s looks and the soothing voice of Bing Crosby and you have a picture of the hero of this film...That trick of movie prestidigitation is the novel twist of the show and is good for a laugh whenever Eddie opens his mouth and Bing’s warbling comes out. To be sure, Mr. Crosby never shows up, but his four fair-haired youngsters are on hand in one scene to represent the family and toss a few quips about dad...Mr. Crosby sings three fairish songs amusingly..."

== Soundtrack ==
Eddie Bracken's songs are dubbed by Bing Crosby (the on-screen credit states: "Mr. Bracken's songs are sung for him by an old friend of his __ and YOURS.")

- "Out of This World" (Harold Arlen / Johnny Mercer) sung by Bing Crosby, and mimed by Eddie Bracken
- "June Comes Around Every Year" (Harold Arlen / Johnny Mercer) sung by Bing Crosby, and mimed by Eddie Bracken
- "I'd Rather Be Me" (Eddie Cherkose / Sam Coslow / Felix Bernard) sung by Bing Crosby, and mimed by Eddie Bracken
- "All I Do Is Beat This Gol-Darn Drum" (Bernie Wayne / Ben Raleigh)
- "A Sailor with an Eight-Hour Pass" (Bernie Wayne / Ben Raleigh]), sung by Cass Daley
- "Ghost of Mr. Chopin" (Eddie Cherkose / Sam Coslow / Felix Bernard)
- "It Takes a Little Bit More" (Eddie Cherkose / Sam Coslow / Felix Bernard).

Bing Crosby recorded three of the songs for Decca Records. Crosby's songs were also included in the Bing's Hollywood series.

"Out of This World" was a hit in 1945 for Jo Stafford and Tommy Dorsey.
