= Sergeants 3 =

1962 film

- Theatrical release poster
- Directed by: John Sturges
- Written by: W.R. Burnett
- Produced by: Frank Sinatra; Howard W. Koch
- Starring: Frank Sinatra; Dean Martin; Peter Lawford; Sammy Davis Jr. Joey Bishop
- Cinematography: Winton C. Hoch
- Edited by: Ferris Webster
- Music by: Billy May
- Production companies: Exxex Productions; Meadway-Claude Productions Company
- Distributed by: United Artists
- Release date: February 10, 1962 (U.S.)
- Running time: 112 minutes
- Country: United States
- Language: English
- Box office: $4.3 million (US/Canada)

Sergeants 3 is a 1962 American comedy/Western film directed by John Sturges and starring Rat Pack icons Frank Sinatra, Dean Martin, Sammy Davis Jr., Peter Lawford and Joey Bishop. It was the last film to feature all five members of the Rat Pack. Sinatra would no longer speak to or work with Lawford following the abrupt cancellation in March 1962 of a visit by Lawford's brother-in-law, President John F. Kennedy, to Sinatra's Palm Springs house (Kennedy opted to stay at Bing Crosby's estate instead).

The film is a remake of Gunga Din (1939), with the setting moved from India to the American West.

== Plot ==
Mike, Chip and Larry are three lusty, brawling U.S. Cavalry sergeants stationed in Indian Territory in 1870. Mike and Chip are determined to prevent Larry from leaving the army at the end of his current hitch to marry the beautiful Amelia Parent.

One night, the three friends befriend a trumpet-playing former slave, Jonah Williams, who dreams of someday becoming a trooper. After a tribe of fanatical Indians begins terrorizing the area, Chip attempts to capture their leader. Accompanied by Jonah, he sneaks into the Indians' secret meeting place while they are conducting one of their mysterious rites, but he is discovered and taken prisoner.

Jonah escapes and races back to inform Mike and Larry. When Larry insists upon going to Chip's rescue, Mike makes him sign a reenlistment paper "just to make his help official" and promises to destroy the paper after the mission.

Mike, Larry and Jonah make their way to the Indian stronghold, but they too end up as prisoners. As the cavalry rides into a trap where a thousand warriors are waiting to ambush them, Jonah blows the regiment's favorite song on his trumpet as a warning. The ensuing battle ends in victory for the cavalry. The three sergeants are decorated and Jonah is made a trooper.

Believing that he has been discharged, Larry drives away in a buggy with Amelia, but Mike shows the post's commanding officer the reenlistment paper that he had promised to destroy.

== Cast ==
- Frank Sinatra as First Sergeant Mike Merry
- Dean Martin as Sergeant Chip Deal
- Sammy Davis Jr. as Jonah Williams
- Peter Lawford as Sergeant Larry Barrett
- Joey Bishop as Sergeant Major Roger Boswell
- Henry Silva as Mountain Hawk
- Ruta Lee as Amelia Parent
- Buddy Lester as Willie Sharpknife
- Phillip Crosby as Corporal Ellis
- Dennis Crosby as Private Page
- Lindsay Crosby as Private Wills
- Hank Henry as Blacksmith
- Dick Simmons as Colonel William Collingwood (credited as Richard Simmons)
- Michael Pate as Watanka
- Armand Alzamora as Caleb
- Richard Hale as White Eagle
- Rodd Redwing as Irregular

== Production ==
The film, known by its working title of Badlands, was filmed in the summer of 1961 in Johnson Canyon, Paria, Kanab and Bryce Canyon in Utah and in House Rock Valley, Arizona. Frank Sinatra, who coproduced the film, rented a ghost town near Kanab as a filming location and sought to establish a 20-mile radius in which no one but those involved with the film would be permitted. During the filming of Some Came Running several years earlier in Indiana, Sinatra was besieged with female admirers and wished to avoid a similar phenomenon.

The film is a remake of Gunga Din with Sinatra in the Victor McLaglen role, Martin in the Cary Grant part, Lawford replacing Douglas Fairbanks, Jr. and Davis in Sam Jaffe's role. The Thugee cult is replaced by the Ghost Dancers, with Michael Pate and Henry Silva appearing as Indians. Burnett was also credited with writing a novelization of the film. Sinatra wanted to use the title Soldiers Three but could not acquire the rights, as the title was owned by Metro-Goldwyn-Mayer for the 1951 film Soldiers Three, another Gunga Din-inspired story set in India.

John Wayne lent Sammy Davis Jr. the hat that he had worn in Legend of the Lost and Rio Bravo to wear in the film.

W.R. Burnett called the film one of his "pet pictures" because they shot his first draft.

== Reception ==
In a contemporary New York Times review, critic A. H. Weiler wrote: "Mr. Sinatra and his loyal coterie switch from slapstick to slaughter and back again with reckless abandon. They may have found a 'home' in this peculiar kind of an 'Army' but their antics may be enough to give a discerning observer the megrims."

Variety called the film a "warmed-over Gunga Din in a westernized version of that epic, with American-style Indians and Vegas-style soldiers of fortune" and wrote: "The essential differences between the two pictures, other than the obvious one of setting, is that the emphasis in Gunga was serious with a tongue-in-cheek overtone, whereas the emphasis in Sergeants is tongue-in-cheek with serious overtones."

According to Kinematograph Weekly, the film was considered a "money maker" at the British box office in 1962.

== Home video ==
The film had seldom been seen after its initial run in cinemas until a DVD was released on May 13, 2008, both as a single disc and as part of a new Rat Pack box set, to commemorate the tenth anniversary of Sinatra's death.
