= Harry Crosby (businessman) =

American investment banker and former actor

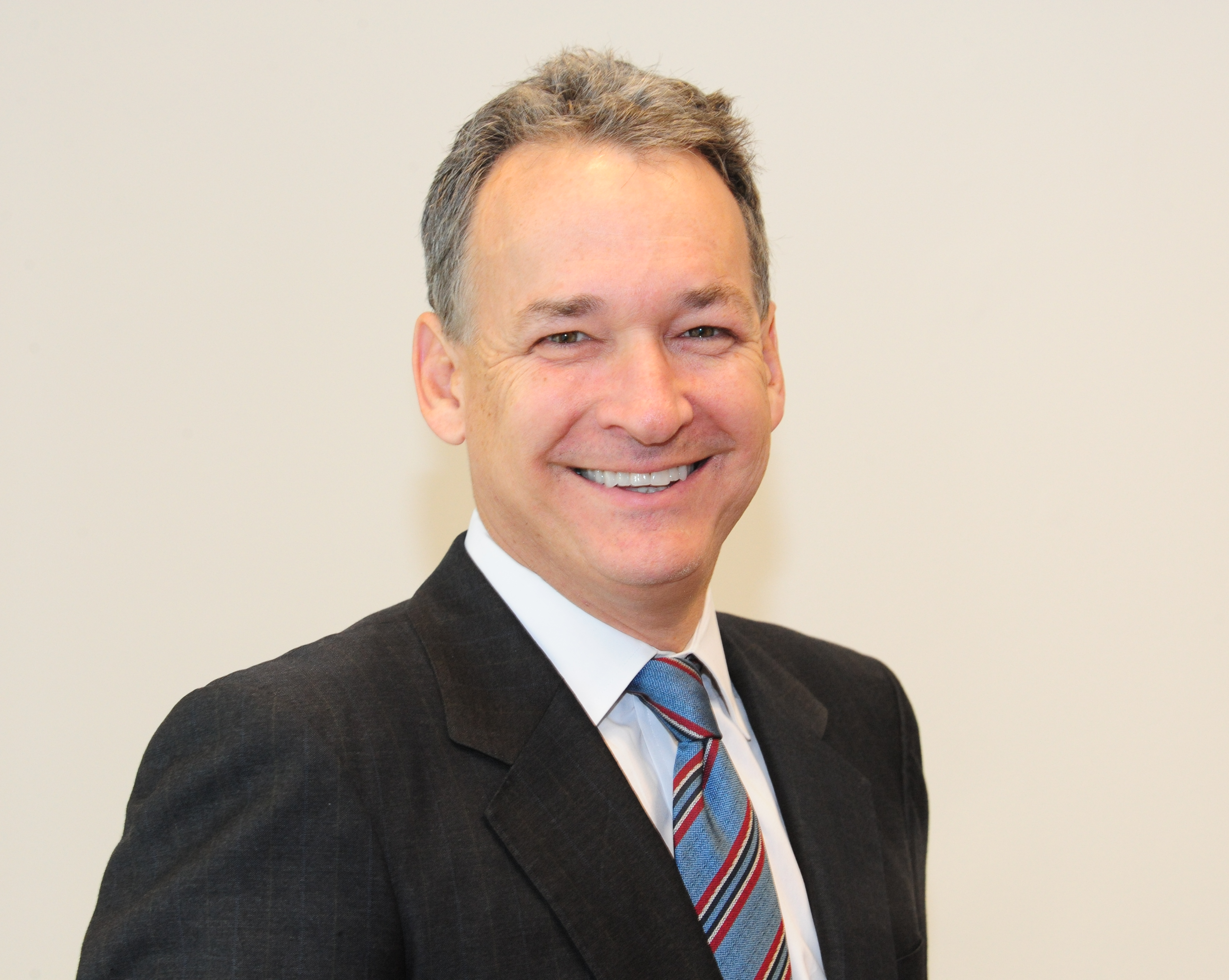
- Crosby in 2013
- Born: Harry Lillis Crosby III; August 8, 1958 (age 68); Los Angeles, California, U.S.
- Education: London Academy of Music and Dramatic Art; Fordham University
- Occupations: Investor, actor
- Years active: 1970–1984 (actor); 1985–2024 (investor)
- Spouse: Mihaela Skobe (m. 2003)
- Children: 2
- Parent(s): Bing Crosby; Kathryn Crosby
- Relatives: Mary Crosby (sister); Nathaniel Crosby (brother); Gary Crosby (half-brother); Phillip Crosby (half-brother); Dennis Crosby (half-brother); Lindsay Crosby (half-brother); Larry Crosby (uncle); Bob Crosby (uncle); Chris Crosby (cousin); Denise Crosby (half-niece)

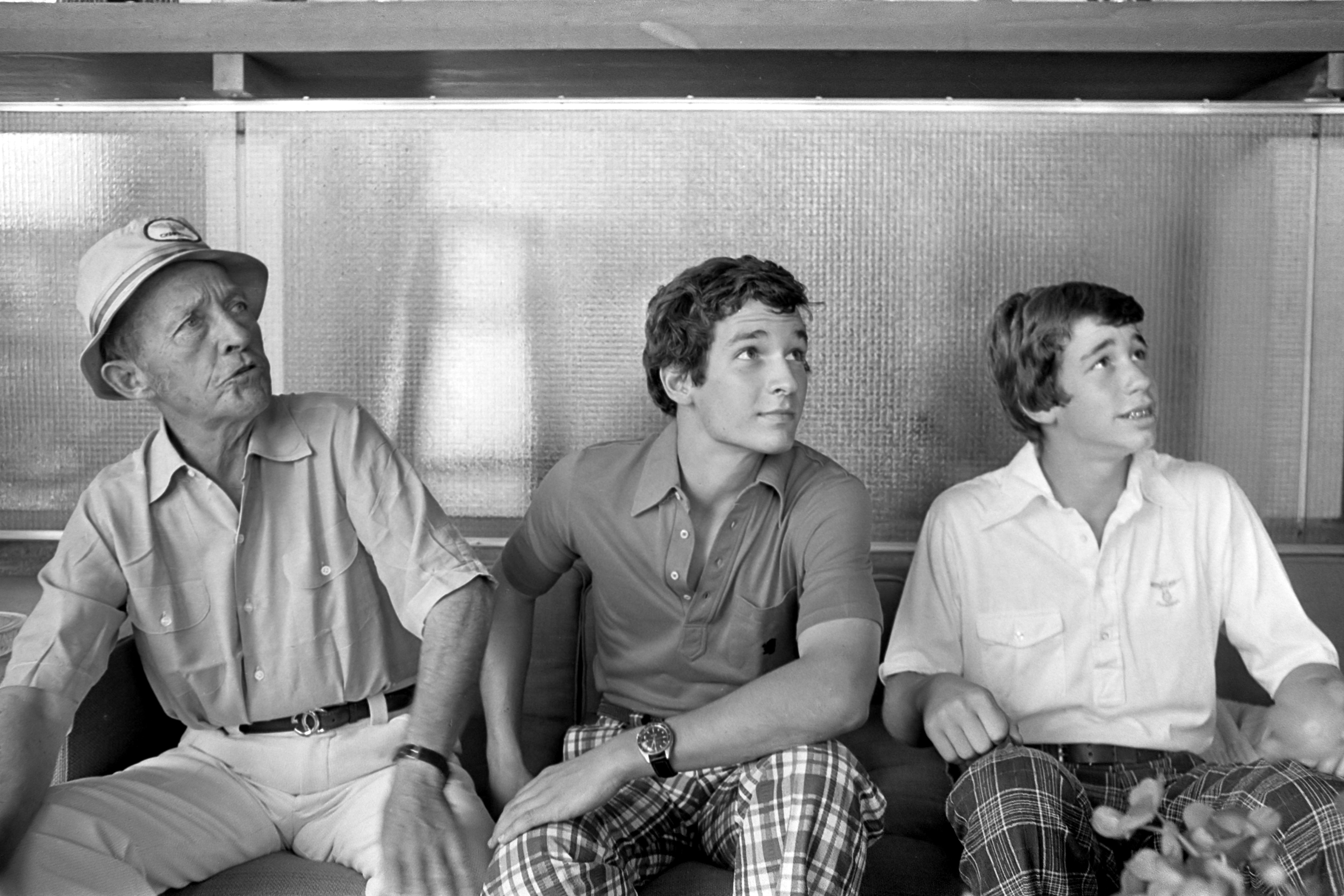
Bing Crosby, Harry Crosby and Nathaniel Crosby, 1975

Harry Lillis Crosby III (born August 8, 1958) is an American investment banker and former actor, the fifth son and namesake of entertainer Bing Crosby.

== Personal life ==
Crosby was born at Hollywood Presbyterian Medical Center in Los Angeles, California. He is the fifth son of actor and singer Bing Crosby, and the eldest from Bing's second marriage to actress Kathryn Crosby. Harry is the elder brother of Mary and Nathaniel Crosby; the younger half-brother of Gary, Dennis, Phillip and Lindsay Crosby; the half-uncle of Denise Crosby; and the nephew of Bob Crosby and Larry Crosby.

Crosby has been in investment banking since 1985 and is a partner at Cranemere. He attended the London Academy of Music and Dramatic Art from 1977 to 1980 and received an MBA at Gabelli School of Business of Fordham University.

== Investment banking and private equity ==
Crosby began his career at Lehman Brothers in 1987, working from associate level to director.

In 1993, he became managing director of the Credit Suisse Financial Sponsors Group, where he established key relationships. He subsequently became group head and managing director of North America Financial Sponsors Group at Merrill Lynch, where he managed clients such as KKR, Carlyle and Bain.

In 2005, he became general partner at Snow Phipps, a private equity firm specializing in leveraged acquisitions, build-ups, recapitalizations, restructuring, and growth equity investments, of small to middle market companies. He was involved in the firm's sale of Excel Mining Systems to Orica for approximately $670mn.

In 2012, he became general partner at Cranemere, investing in middle market private companies in North America, Germany and Austria. Crosby has also been on a number of other corporate boards, including that of Excel Mining Systems.

== Philanthropy ==
Crosby has been on philanthropic boards, including the Monterey Peninsula Foundation, a charitable organisation that funds education, health, human services, arts, community and environmental projects.

As a trained musician, he is also an active fundraiser and board member of Jazz at Lincoln Center, a major performing arts institution structured as a non-profit organization and housed at the Time Warner Center in Manhattan, New York. He has worked alongside the likes of Wynton Marsalis, jazz trumpeter and artistic director of Jazz at Lincoln Center.

== Film and television ==
Before his career in banking and private equity, Crosby gained show business experience at an early age by appearing with his father and family on various Christmas television specials from 1965 to 1977 and at the London Palladium in 1976 and 1977. He has appeared in several films and television programs, including The Hollywood Palace, Friday the 13th, Riding for the Pony Express, and The Private History of a Campaign That Failed.

== Filmography ==
Film
| Year | Title | Role | Notes |
|---|---|---|---|
| 1980 | Friday the 13th | Bill Brown | killed the snake |
| 1981 | The Private History of a Campaign That Failed | Cpl. Ed Stevens | TV movie |
| 1989 | Hollow Venus: Diary of a Go-Go Dancer | Cute Rocker | |
Television
| Year | Title | Role | Notes |
| 1966–1968 | The Hollywood Palace | Himself | 3 episodes |
| 1970 | Bing Crosby's Christmas Show | Himself | TV special |
| 1971 | Bing Crosby and the Sounds of Christmas | Himself | TV special |
| 1972 | Christmas with the Bing Crosbys | Himself | TV special |
| 1973 | Bing Crosby's Sun Valley Christmas Show | Himself | TV special |
| 1974 | Christmas with the Bing Crosby's | Himself | TV special |
| 1975 | Merry Christmas, Fred, from the Crosbys | Himself | TV special |
| 1976 | Bing Crosby's White Christmas | Himself | TV special |
| 1977 | Bing - A 50th Anniversary Gala | Himself | TV special |
| 1977 | Bing in Norway | Himself | TV special |
| 1977 | Bing Crosby's Merrie Olde Christmas | Himself | TV special |
| 1978 | Bing Crosby: The Christmas Years | Himself | TV special |
| 1980 | Riding for the Pony Express | Albie Foreman | TV pilot |
| 1984 | Double Trouble | Steven | Episode: "Heartache" |
