= Auroratone =

1940s films with music and color patterns

Auroratone films were produced by the Auroratone Foundation of America Inc. in Hollywood, Los Angeles, California. The films showed crystal-like abstract color patterns that changed and blended with each other. The patterns were produced by using crystallizing chemicals and polarized light, which were then synchronized to a variety of recorded musical tracks. The process was developed by English psychologist and scientist Cecil Stokes, who was the founder and technical director of the company. Stokes was issued patent 2292172 on August 4, 1942, for "Process and Apparatus for Producing Musical Rhythm in Color".

The films were combined into a thirty-minute-long color movie entitled Music In Color. The first films were presented to the public in 1940 in San Diego and were then shown at various theaters in the United States and Canada.

The name "Auroratone" was suggested by Father Bernard Hubbard, the "Glacier Priest", who characterized the process as the nearest thing to the natural Aurora Borealis which he had ever seen.

The films were used as an experimental aid to the treatment of psychiatric patients, in particular war veterans. Some of these films were made available in August, 1945 to researchers Herbert E. Rubin and Elias Katz at Crile General Hospital in Cleveland, Ohio. Bing Crosby was involved with these films due to his being a shareholder in the foundation and his interest in the rehabilitation of veterans.

The Auroratone film process was considered as an application that would be incorporated into jukeboxes.

A restored version of "When the Organ Played 'Oh Promise Me'", taken from a 16 mm film, is viewable on YouTube.

== Known films ==
The known films include:

- "Claire de Lune" (Claude Debussy) played by Andre Kostelanetz and his orchestra
- "Going My Way" sung by Bing Crosby and accompanied by Lt. Col. Edward Dunstedter, AAF, on the organ
- "The Lost Chord" featuring a solo organ by Lt. Col. Edward Dunstedter, AAF
- "Home on the Range" sung by Bing Crosby with an accompaniment on organ
- "I Dream of Jeannie With the Light Brown Hair" (Stephen Foster) featuring an organ solo by Lt. Col. Edward Dunstedter, AAF
- "Ave Maria" (by Franz Schubert) sung by Bing Crosby with an organ accompaniment
- "Now The Day Is Over" sung by Bing Crosby
- "When You Wish Upon a Star" sung by Bing Crosby
- "When the Organ Played 'Oh Promise Me'" sung by Bing Crosby with an organ accompaniment by Lt. Col. Edward Dunstedter, AAF
- "Adeste Fidelis" sung by Bing Crosby
- "American Prayer" by Ginny Simms
- "The Lone Star Trail" sung by Bing Crosby
- Prelude to "Lohengrin" by the Philadelphia Symphony Orchestra
- "The Lord’s Prayer" sung by John Charles Thomas with music by Albert Hay Malotte
- "Moonlight Sonata" played by Miss April Ayres
- "None But the Lonely Heart" by Lawrence Tibbett
- "The Old Rugged Cross" sung by the All-Girl Orchestra and Choir, directed by Phil Spitalny
- "Silent Night" sung by Bing Crosby
