= Dixie Lee =

American actress, dancer, and singer (1909–1952)

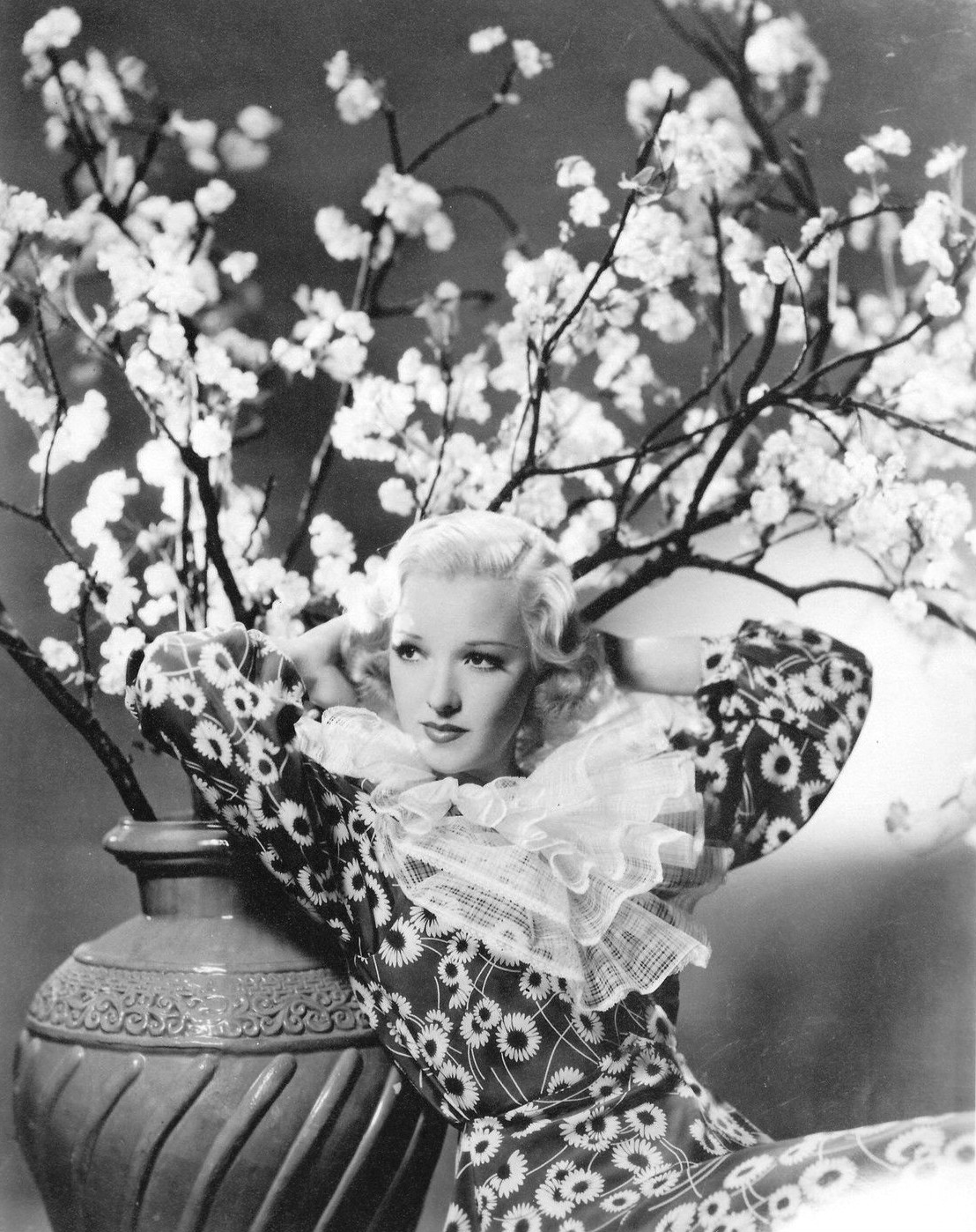
- Lee in 1935
- Born: Wilma Winifred Wyatt; November 4, 1909; Harriman, Tennessee, U.S.
- Died: November 1, 1952 (aged 42); Los Angeles, California, U.S.
- Resting place: Holy Cross Cemetery, Culver City, California
- Occupations: Actress; dancer; singer
- Years active: 1929–1935
- Spouse: Bing Crosby (m. 1930)
- Children: Gary Crosby Dennis Crosby Phillip Crosby Lindsay Crosby
- Relatives: Denise Crosby (granddaughter)

Dixie Lee (born Wilma Winifred Wyatt; November 4, 1909 – November 1, 1952) was an American actress, dancer, and singer. She was the first wife of singer Bing Crosby.

== Biography ==
Lee was born Wilma Winifred Wyatt in Harriman, Tennessee, on November 4, 1909, to Evan Wyatt and the former Nora Scarbrough. (When she entered show business, she gave her birth date as November 4, 1911.) After moving to Chicago, she graduated from Senn High School. While in Chicago she adopted the professional name "Dixie Carroll" to enter an amateur singing contest in May 1928. She won the contest and the prize was a job as a singer at a roadhouse called College Inn. While working there, she was spotted by a talent scout and given a part in the travelling company of Good News. A film contract was subsequently offered and Winfield Sheehan of the Fox film studio changed her name to Dixie Lee, to avoid confusion with actresses Nancy Carroll and Sue Carol.

== Marriage ==
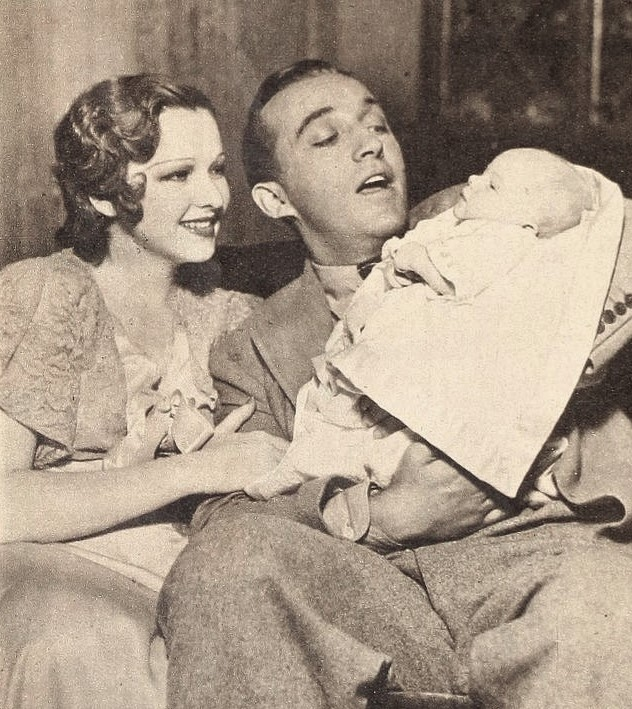
Dixie Lee with Bing Crosby and their first son Gary Crosby, 1933

She met Bing Crosby at the age of 20 and they married on September 29, 1930, at the Church of the Blessed Sacrament in Hollywood. Dixie Lee was better known than Crosby at that time, as illustrated by the incorrect news release issued by the Associated Press, which reported she married "Murray Crosey".

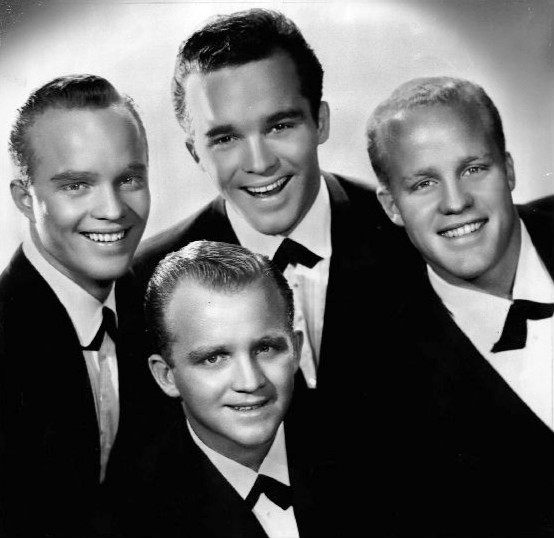
The Crosby Brothers, sons of Dixie Lee and Bing Crosby, 1959

There were early problems with the marriage and on March 4, 1931, Dixie announced that they had separated and that she would soon be filing a divorce suit charging mental cruelty. She went on to say, "We have only been married about six months, but we have already found out that we are not suited for each other. Our separation is an amiable one, and the only reason for it is that we just cannot get along. 'Bing' is a fine boy as a friend, but married he and I just cannot be happy." Within a week, a reconciliation came about. Dixie had gone with a party of friends to Agua Caliente in Tijuana for the weekend. To one of the girls in the crowd, she confided she was not half as angry with Crosby as she was at the parting a week ago. The girl got Crosby on the long-distance telephone and presently he and Dixie were talking to each other. An hour and a half later, Crosby appeared at Agua Caliente, having flown down in an airplane, and all was well again.

They had four sons: Gary (1933); twins Phillip and Dennis (1934); and Lindsay (1938). Lindsay and Dennis died by suicide as adults, Lindsay in 1989 and Dennis in 1991.

After the birth of the twins, she made a brief return to show business. Dixie Lee made two appearances on the Shell Chateau radio program in 1935, and she made three more films. Her most notable film is probably Love in Bloom (1935). Her last film was Redheads on Parade, released also in 1935, but the reviews were mediocre. She made a couple of records on March 11, 1935, "You've Got Me Doing Things", a song she introduced in the film Love in Bloom. This was her first record, and she backed it with "My Heart Is an Open Book". She was encouraged back into the recording studio again on July 27, 1936, and she recorded "Until the Real Thing Comes Along" and "When a Lady Meets a Gentleman Down South" for Decca Records. Her final recordings were two duets with her husband recorded on August 19, 1936: "A Fine Romance" and "The Way You Look Tonight". She then retired from show business.

== Personal life ==
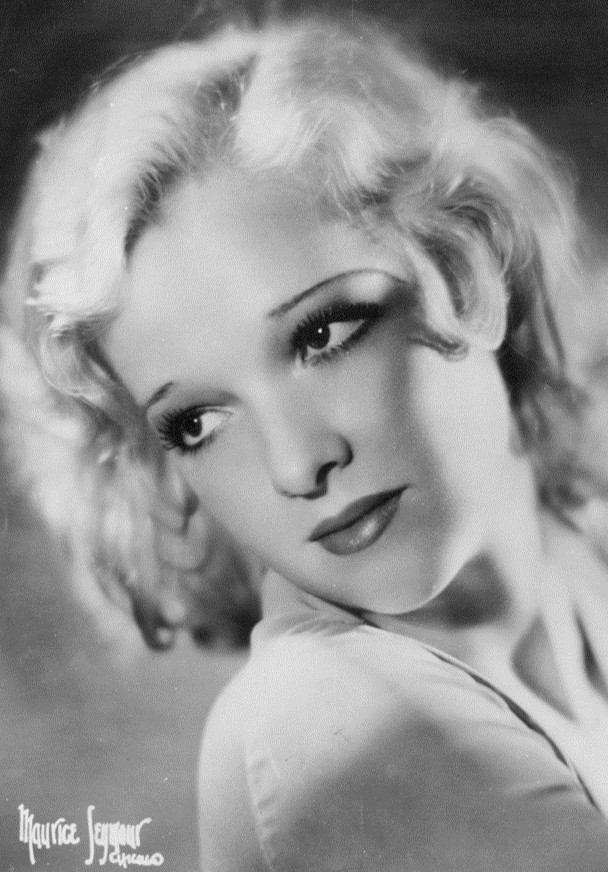
Dixie Lee, 1935

Crosby's biographer Gary Giddins describes Dixie Lee as a shy, private person with a sensible approach to life. Giddins recounts that Dixie and Bing, as young marrieds, were often invited to parties where liquor was plentiful, and Dixie drank socially to keep up with Bing. She succeeded in curbing Bing's alcohol consumption, but her own alcoholism worsened. This led to problems with the marriage and divorce was briefly contemplated by Bing in January 1941. In January 1945, Dixie Lee was rushed to St. Vincent's Hospital after collapsing with a "respiratory infection". Crosby accompanied his wife to the hospital in an ambulance and remained at her bedside during the night. A later article in Picturegoer magazine suggested that she had taken an accidental overdose of sleeping tablets and that her life was in the balance for over a week.

Bing Crosby went to Europe in 1950 for an extended visit and there were headlines stating that the Crosby marriage was strained, but this was subsequently denied.

Crosby persuaded her to take part in his radio show broadcast on December 20, 1950, her first appearance with him on radio. It was her first professional appearance since 1936. In January 1951, press reports indicated that Crosby had recently moved back into his Holmby Hills home with Dixie Lee. He had been spending much of his time at his home at Pebble Beach.

== Death ==
Dixie Lee died from ovarian cancer on November 1, 1952, three days shy of her 43rd birthday. She was interred in the Crosby plot at Holy Cross Cemetery in Culver City, California, after a Requiem High Mass at the Church of the Good Shepherd in Beverly Hills on November 3.

== Filmography ==
- 1929: Knights Out (Short)
- 1929: Fox Movietone Follies of 1929 as Lead Dancer In Fashion Number
- 1929: Why Leave Home? as Billie
- 1929: Happy Days as Lead Dancer in 'Crazy Feet' number
- 1930: Harmony at Home as Rita Joyce
- 1930: Let's Go Places as Dixie
- 1930: The Big Party as Kitty Collins
- 1930: Cheer Up and Smile as Margie
- 1931: No Limit as Dotty 'Dodo' Potter
- 1931: Mr. Lemon of Orange as Hat Check Girl (uncredited)
- 1931: Quick Millions as Stone's Secretary (uncredited)
- 1931: Young Sinners as Girl (uncredited)
- 1931: Night Life in Reno as Dorothy Pierce
- 1931: Darn Tootin (Short) as Singer
- 1934: Manhattan Love Song as Geraldine Stewart
- 1935: Love in Bloom as Violet Downey
- 1935: Redheads on Parade as Ginger Blair (final film role)

== In popular culture ==
- The 1947 film Smash-Up, the Story of a Woman is loosely based on Dixie Lee's life.

== Legacy ==
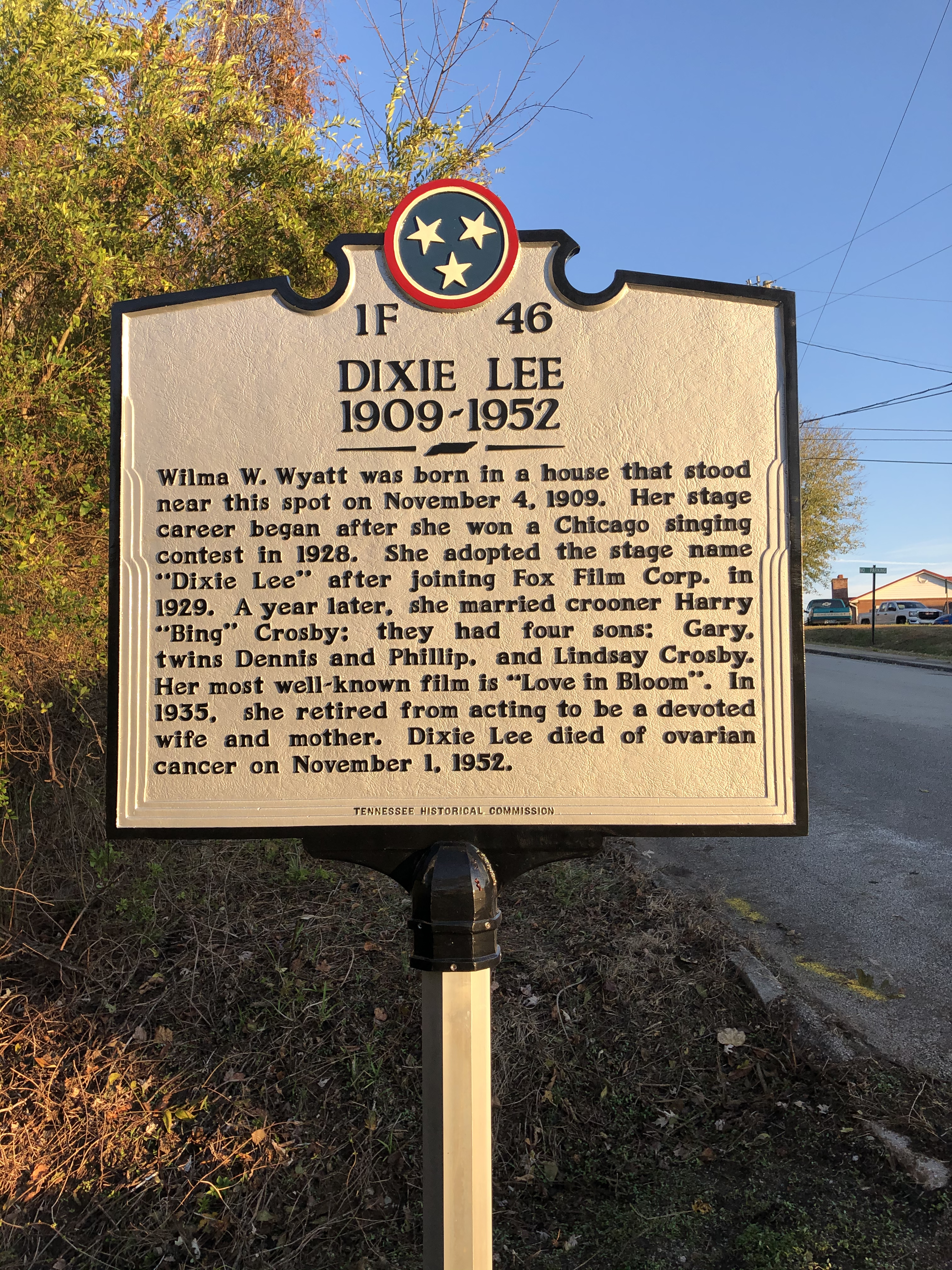
Dixie Lee (1F 46) Tennessee State Historical Marker near Wilma Wyatt's birthplace in Harriman, Tennessee

On November 8, 2019, the Tennessee Historical Commission and the City of Harriman, Tennessee, unveiled a Tennessee State Historical Marker (1F 46) near Dixie's birthplace in the Walnut Hill section of downtown Harriman.
