= Joshua Fit the Battle of Jericho =

African-American spiritual

"Joshua Fit the Battle of Jericho" (or alternatively "Joshua Fought de Battle of Jericho", "Joshua Fit the Battle" or just Joshua and various other titles) is a well-known African-American spiritual.

== Background ==
The lyrics allude to the biblical story of the Battle of Jericho, in which Joshua led the Israelites against Canaan (Joshua 6:15-21).

Like those of many other spirituals, the song's words may also be alluding to eventual escape from slavery – in the case of this song, "And the walls came tumblin' down." The lively melody and rhythm also provided energy and inspiration. Critic Robert Cummings wrote: "The jaunty, spirited theme hardly sounds like the product of the pre–Civil War era, and would not sound out of place in a ragtime or even jazz musical from the early 20th century. The closing portion of the tune, sung to the words quoted above, is its most memorable portion: the notes plunge emphatically and impart a glorious sense of collapse, of triumph."

== Composition & recordings ==
The song is believed to have been composed by enslaved peoples in the first half of the 19th century. Some references suggest that it was copyrighted by Jay Roberts in 1865. In 1882, the song was published in Jubilee Songs by M. G. Slayton and in A Collection of Revival Hymns and Plantation Melodies by Marshall W. Taylor.

Early published versions include some parts in dialect, such as "fit" for "fought". A rare, unpublished variation, "Jacob fought the battle of Jericho", has evolved and has been heard sung in the later twentieth century. In this instance, "Jacob" refers to the people of Israel, who won the battle. Though this version is almost never used, the two-syllable name "Jacob" fits more naturally into the song's meter than the three-syllable name "Joshua".

- The first recorded version was by Harrod's Jubilee Singers, on Paramount Records No. 12116 in 1922 (though some sources suggest 1924). The Online 78 Discography entry for this record credits Jay Roberts as the author.
- Later recordings include those by Paul Robeson (1925), Mahalia Jackson (1958), Clara Ward, Laurie London, Hugh Laurie (2011) and Elvis Presley (1960) among many others.
- In 1930, Marshall Bartholomew created his arrangement of the song.
- Composer and conductor Morton Gould used the song as the basis for his 1941 composition for concert band, Jericho Rhapsody.
- Ralph Flanagan adapted it under the title "Joshua". Ralph Flanagan and His Orchestra recorded the spiritual in New York City on March 1, 1950. It was released by RCA Victor Records as catalog number 20-3724 (in USA) and by EMI on the His Master's Voice label as catalog numbers B 9938 and IP 604.
- Bing Crosby included the song in a medley on his album 101 Gang Songs (1961)
- The Kim Sisters performed the song live on the Ed Sullivan Show in 1965.
- The Golden Gate Quartet performed the song live in 1967 in Yugoslavia.
- Sister Thea Bowman learned the song from her elders and recorded it in 1988 on the stereocassette Songs of My People. In 2020 it was re-released for the 30th anniversary of her death as part of the digital album Songs of My People: The Complete Collection.
- Hugh Laurie covered it on his 2013 album Let Them Talk.
- A version by Grant Green featured briefly in episode 2 "Half Loop" of the TV thriller Severance.
