= Nathaniel Crosby =

American amateur golfer (born 1961)

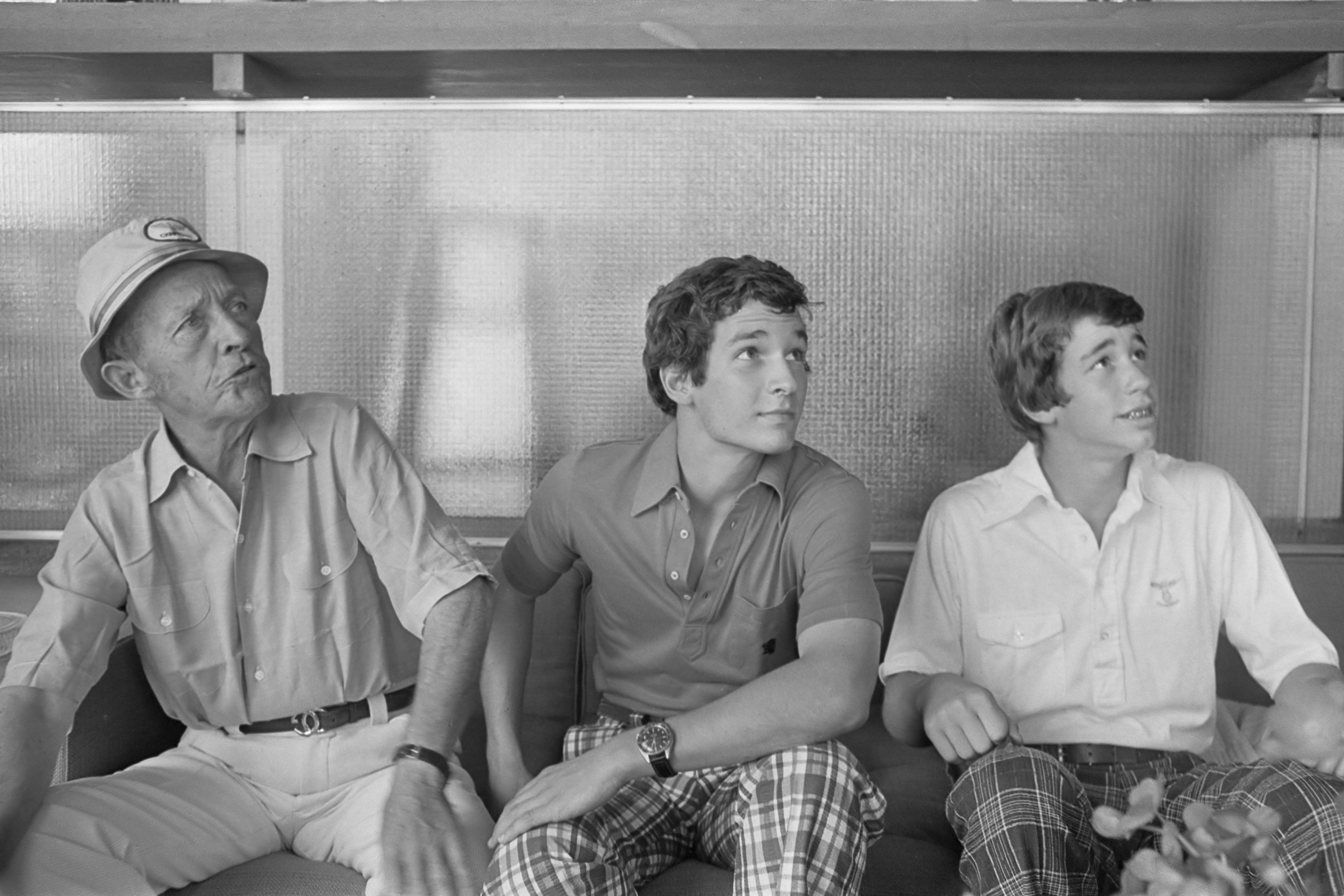
- Bing, Harry, and Nathaniel Crosby in 1975

Personal information
- Full name: Nathaniel Patrick Crosby
- Nationality: United States
- Born: October 29, 1961 (age 65) Hillsborough, California, U.S.
- Height: 6 ft 2 in (1.88 m)
- Spouse: Sheila
- Children: 6

Career
- Sport: Golf
- College: University of Miami
- Turned professional: 1984
- Reinstated amateur: 1994
- Former tour: European Tour

Best results in major championships
- Masters Tournament: CUT: 1982, 1983, 1984
- PGA Championship: DNP
- U.S. Open: 59th: 1982
- The Open Championship: CUT: 1982, 1983

Nathaniel Patrick Crosby (born October 29, 1961) is an American golfer. He won the 1981 U.S. Amateur and played on the winning 1982 Eisenhower Trophy and 1983 Walker Cup teams. He turned professional but had little success and was later reinstated as an amateur. He is the seventh child and sixth son of Bing Crosby.

== Early life ==
Crosby was born and raised in Hillsborough, California. He was the third and youngest child of Bing Crosby and actress Kathryn Grant. Bing Crosby also had four children from his first marriage.

Although his father was a showbiz celebrity, he was, in Nathaniel's words, "determined that we didn't grow up to be Hollywood brats." The family lived hundreds of miles from Los Angeles, in northern California, and Bing instilled a strong work ethic in his children. In the summer Nathaniel and his siblings worked from sunup to sundown baling alfalfa and vaccinating cattle on the family ranch. Crosby stated later in life in his memoir 18 Holes with Bing, "I always longed for summer to end so I could go back to school." He had a cool relationship with his father, who was a golf fanatic, and got into golf as a way to connect with him. Crosby stated, “I learned golf so that I could spend more time with him." Crosby largely learned golf from the family's Irish nanny, Bridget, who was also a pro golfer. Crosby won the club championship at the family's country club, Burlingame Country Club, at the age of 15. His father stated after the victory, "Today is the happiest day of my life." Crosby attended Burlingame High School and was on the golf team.

Crosby performed with his father, mother, brother, and sister in several Christmas television shows and at the London Palladium in 1976. He starred along with the rest of his family in the 1970 television musical Goldilocks. Crosby stated that he was embarrassed to perform in the Christmas specials as he was not a natural performer.

== Amateur career ==
Crosby attended the University of Miami and played for the golf team. At the University of Miami, he qualified for the 1981 U.S. Amateur held at The Olympic Club in San Francisco, which he won at age 19, making him the third-youngest U.S. Amateur winner ever.

In addition to this youth, Crosby was not considered a uniquely talented amateur golfer. Golf writer Herbert Warren Wind wrote in The New Yorker, "His swing was so unimpressive that most observers felt there had to be at least a thousand better amateur golfers in the country." He was usually not even the top golfer on his college's golf team, occasionally ranking 3rd- or 4th-best. Crosby defeated future PGA Tour pro Willie Wood in the semifinal and then 24-year-old engineer Brian Lindley in the final. The win qualified him for the 1982 U.S. Open, again held at another local northern California course, Pebble Beach. Crosby shot an opening round 77 and then quadrupled-bogeyed the par-5 14th hole on Friday putting him in danger of missing the cut. However, he shot −1 for the rest of the round to make the cut by two. He would shoot 76-77 on the weekend to finish at 303 (+15) and in solo 59th place. He was low amateur, besting future PGA Tour pro Corey Pavin by a shot. Also in 1982 Crosby won the Porter Cup, an elite medal-play event for amateurs. Most recent champions of the event – like Ben Crenshaw, John Cook, and Scott Simpson – had gone on to win on the PGA Tour, so the victory certainly boded well for Crosby. He also played on the victorious 1982 Eisenhower Trophy and 1983 Walker Cup teams.

== Professional career ==
After graduating from the University of Miami, Crosby became a professional golf player in 1984. He failed to gain a place on the PGA Tour. In the 1980s the PGA Tour did not have a developmental tour so many young golfers in Crosby's situation played overseas. Crosby decided to play in Europe, qualifying for the European Tour before the 1985 season. He played full-time in Europe from 1985 to 1987. His best year was in 1985. He recorded a third place finish at the Portuguese Open, his only top-10 of the season. He would finish 87th on the Order of Merit and kept his card.

The 1986 season was more of a struggle as he did not record any top-10s and missed the majority of cuts. He finished 115th on the Order of Merit and barely kept his card. In addition, he played five events on the PGA Tour that season, playing on sponsor's exemptions, but missed the cut in all of them. The 1987 season was Crosby's final season in Europe. He missed the cut in 14 of his 18 events and finished 158th on the Order of Merit, not keeping his card. His third place at the 1985 Portuguese Open would turn out to be the only top-10 of his European Tour career.

Crosby retired as a touring professional and worked as a golf industry executive for the remainder of his career. In 1988 he became president of the Tony Penna Golf Company, an equipment manufacturer, where he worked for ten years. He then worked at Orlimar for 4 years, working as an executive at direct marketing. Since his experience at Orlimar he formed his own company to pursue high-end real estate and golf developments. He is also currently trying to market his dad's name more, whose "brand" he feels is neglected compared to other stars of the era.

== Reinstated amateur status ==
Crosby has intermittently been involved in notable golf events since his retirement as a full-time touring professional. He regained his amateur status in 1994, initially in order to play in the AT&T Pebble Beach National Pro-Am, the tournament founded by his father. In 2007 he played in the Porter Cup, the site of one of his greatest triumphs as a junior golfer. He did not do well this time though, finishing in last place by five shots. He also attempted to qualify for the 2007 U.S Amateur. The event was held at San Francisco's Olympic Club for the first time since his 1981 victory.

Crosby's renewed amateur status allowed him to participate in the United States Walker Cup team as captain for the 2019 and 2021 events, winning both tournaments. He has also played in the U.S. Senior Amateur, the USGA's championship for amateurs over 55 years of age.

== Personal life ==
Crosby lives in North Palm Beach, Florida. He has been married twice. He has four children with his first wife. He is now married to Sheila and has two step-children with her.

== Awards and honors ==
Crosby was inducted into the University of Miami Sports Hall of Fame in 2005.

== Amateur wins ==
- 1981 U.S. Amateur
- 1982 Porter Cup

== Results in major championships ==
Tournament	1982	1983	1984
Masters Tournament	CUT	CUT	CUT
U.S. Open	59 _{LA}		
The Open Championship	CUT	CUT	

Note: Crosby never played in the PGA Championship.

Did not play

LA = Low amateur
CUT = missed the half-way cut

== U.S. national team appearances ==
Amateur

- Eisenhower Trophy: 1982 (winners)
- Walker Cup: 1983 (winners), 2019 (winners, non-playing captain), 2021 (winners, non-playing captain)
