= Chris Crosby (singer) =

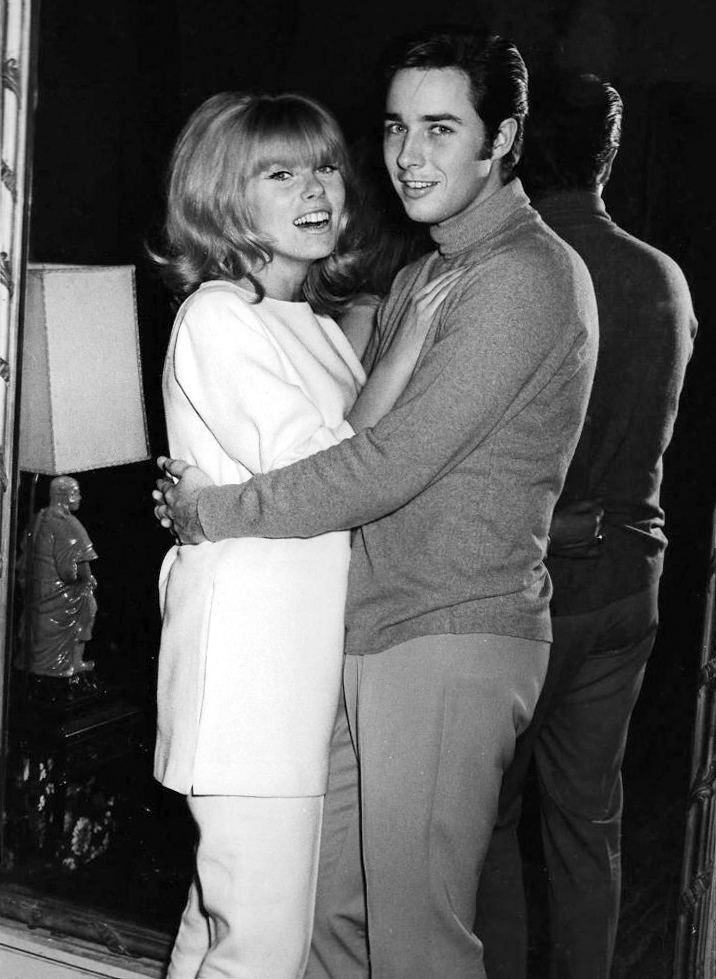
- Chris Crosby (right) and his wife Britt Semand in 1966

Background information
- Born: Christopher Douglas Crosby; June 28, 1942 (age 83); Los Angeles, California, United States
- Occupations: Singer, producer
- Years active: 1963–1967
- Labels: Warner Bros.; Atlantic
- Website: theartofmonteque.com/2014/08/31/the-artist-chris-crosby

Christopher Douglas "Chris" Crosby (born June 28, 1942) is an American singer of the 1960s, the son of swing band leader Bob Crosby, and nephew of Bing Crosby.

== Career ==
He debuted with Warner Bros in 1963, featured in the music film Hootenanny Hoot, then issued an album, Meet Chris Crosby on MGM.

He moved to Atlantic in 1966, and performed his first single for Atlantic, "Hippy Lullaby", on the Today Show in November 1967.

As a record producer he set up Jupiter Productions, Ltd., then Sun House Productions.

Having first sung with his father’s band on CBS when he was 12 years old, Crosby made a documentary about his uncle, Bing Crosby, Crosby in Search of Crosby: Bing the Truth Behind the Legend (2016).

== Discography ==
=== Albums ===
- Meet Chris Crosby, August 1964

=== Singles ===
- A: "Something Special" / B: "Someday After Forever" Warner Bros. Feb 1963
- A: "Young and in Love" / B: "Raindrops in My Heart" MGM Jan 1964
- A: "All I Do Is Dream of You" / B: "Tomorrow" Apr 1964
- A: "Always" B: "Imagine" Jul 1964
- A: "I Can Make the Raindrops Fall" / B: "You're My World" Pacemaker 1965
- A: "Only the Young" / B: "Love Is a Rose Challenge" USA 1965
- A: "Red Roses" / B: "Pretty Girls (Look So Fine)" Challenge
- A: "Hippie Lullaby" / B: "I Will Wait for You" Nov 1967
- A: "Atlanta Georgia Stray" / B: "If That's the Way You Feel" Columbia
