= The Bing Crosby Show =

The Bing Crosby Show can refer to any of the following, all starring American entertainer Bing Crosby:

- The Bing Crosby – Chesterfield Show, a 1949–52 weekly variety radio series
- The Bing Crosby Show for General Electric, a 1952–54 weekly variety radio series
- The Bing Crosby Show (TV special), a 1954 TV special
- The Bing Crosby Show (1954–1956), a daily radio series
- The Bing Crosby Show (1964 TV series), a TV sitcom

== See also ==
- The Bing Crosby – Rosemary Clooney Show, a 1960–62 daily radio series
