= A Christmas Sing with Bing (1955–1962) =

American radio program series with a Christmas theme

- Genre: Christmas music
- Running time: 60 minutes
- Country of origin: United States
- Language: English
- Home station: CBS
- Starring: Bing Crosby, Paul Weston & His Orchestra, The Norman Luboff Choir
- Announcer: Ken Carpenter
- Written by: Bill Morrow
- Directed by: Murdo MacKenzie
- Produced by: Bill Morrow Sam Pierce
- Recording studio: Hollywood, U.S.
- Original release: December 24, 1955 – December 24, 1962
- No. of series: 1
- No. of episodes: 8
- Opening theme: "Happy Holiday"
- Sponsored by: Insurance Company of North America

A Christmas Sing with Bing was a series of transcribed radio hours hosted by Bing Crosby and broadcast on Christmas Eve for eight years from 1955 to 1962. The first edition of the program was released as an LP by Decca Records in 1956. Insurance Company of North America was the broadcast sponsor.

== Background ==
Following the demise of the traditional weekly Bing Crosby variety show in the spring of 1954, to be replaced by a nightly 15-minute disc-jockey format show, radio listeners missed out on a full-fledged, half-hour Christmas program hosted by Crosby for the first time in twenty years. In 1955, this situation was remedied when Crosby, the undisputed voice of Christmas at the time, embarked on one of his most ambitious radio projects ever; a transcribed one-hour Christmas spectacular featuring guest artists that spanned the entire globe. It was called "A Christmas Sing with Bing" and the success of the initial broadcast resulted in the show running each year until 1962.

== Program One ==
The first show was broadcast at 9 pm, on CBS on Christmas Eve, 1955 and it was carried by some 200 stations along with hook-ups on the CBC, AFRS, and VOA for a truly global listening experience. For the ‘around the world’ aspect, the program included cut-in's of carols and hymns from France, Rome, and Canada, along with stops in the U.S. at St. Louis, Salt Lake City, and Hollywood. The show was scripted as though it was ‘live" and listeners heard Crosby introducing his own songs and choirs from other parts of the world as though it was all happening on Christmas Eve. Crosby had actually recorded his contribution on December 19, 1955. The songs heard were:

1. "Happy Holiday" – (Paul Weston and his Orchestra, Norman Luboff Choir)
2. "Joy to the World" – (Bing Crosby)
3. "Hark! The Herald Angels Sing – (St. Louis Christmas Carols Association Choir)
4. "White Christmas" – (Bing Crosby)
5. "Adeste Fideles" (Little Singers of Granby)
6. "We Three Kings of Orient Are" – (Mormon Tabernacle Choir)
7. "The First Nowell" – (Bing Crosby)
8. "Carol of the Bells" – (The Voices of Christmas)
9. "What Christmas Means to Me" – (Delores Short)
10. "Good King Wenceslas" – (Bing Crosby)
11. "Jesus Sauveur Adorable" – (Traditional) - (Neuilly Boys Choir)
12. "Angels We Have Heard on High" – (Reed Warblers Choir)
13. "Away in a Manger" – (Bing Crosby)
14. "Tu Scendi Dalle Stelle" – (The Vatican Choir)
15. "Deck the Halls" – (Bing Crosby)
16. "God Rest Ye Merry, Gentlemen" – (Dedham Choral Society)
17. "O Little Town of Bethlehem" – (Bing Crosby)
18. "Silent Night" – (Bing Crosby)
19. "Happy Holiday (reprise)" – (Bing Crosby, Norman Luboff Choir)

The broadcast attracted a huge audience and Variety magazine commented: "Insurance Company of America laid out some $30,000 for this Christmas Eve ‘Sing with Bing Hour’ and that might be figured as cheap considering the promotion values.... If there was an important Christmas carol left out by either Der Bingle or the pick-up points, it didn't come to mind..."

CBS had run a ‘What Christmas Means to Me Contest’ for children and they reported that over 70,000 entries were received. The winner was seven year-old Delores Short who had spent her whole life in the Pine Ridge, Kentucky Children's Home. She duly read her letter on the show.

Decca Records issued an LP of the program (slightly edited and minus the commercials) in time for the 1956 Holiday market and this too was well received.

Crosby had not recorded with Paul Weston before and it turned out to be a happy combination. Weston had been music director at Capitol Records and then at Columbia where he built a reputation for his mood music with albums such as "Music for Dreaming". He was married to Jo Stafford who worked with Crosby on a number of occasions.

Norman Luboff was the founder and conductor of the choir bearing his name, one of the leading choral groups of the 1950s, 60s and 70s. They toured yearly from 1963 to 1987, and recorded more than seventy-five albums. The holiday albums "Songs of Christmas" (1956) and "Christmas with the Norman Luboff Choir" (1964) were perennial bestsellers for years.

== Program Two ==
Following the success of the first show, plans were made for a second show and this was broadcast over the CBS network on December 24, 1956. The sponsor was again the Insurance Company of North America. The same basic formula was followed with the addition of the inclusion of Maurice Chevalier in Paris and Sarah Churchill in London, extending their compliments of the season to Hollywood. Crosby added "Adeste Fideles" and "Jingle Bells" to five of the carols he used the previous year, and Rosemary Clooney was heard singing "Away in a Manger", by way of a lullaby to her children, Miguel Ferrer and Maria Ferrer. Nine-year-old Edward Tuchawena, from a Hopi Indian Village 80 miles outside Flagstaff, Arizona, read his winning letter of "What Christmas Means to Me". Canada was represented by a choir from Ottawa, and the Mormon Tabernacle Choir returned to sing a movement from Handel's "Messiah". The same recording of "Tu scendi dalle stelle" by the Vatican Choir from the 1955 broadcast was also played.

The first six "Christmas Sing with Bing" shows appear to have relied, almost entirely, on permutations from a master tape of around a dozen traditional carols by Crosby plus 'White Christmas'. In retrospect the device is glaringly obvious but after an interval of 52 weeks, the average listener would not have been aware of the 'deception' or indeed, worried too much.

Variety reviewed the broadcast saying, ""On Christmas Eve, a songfest with Bing Crosby, interlaced with other show biz personalities, as well as pickups from many corners of the globe, proved to be good listening, showcasing radio as a still dazzling entertainment medium, the mobility of which is hard to beat..."

== Program Three ==
December 24, 1957 saw the third broadcast with the same cast and sponsor. Crosby repeated six of the songs heard in the first two programs. In the same program, Gary Crosby (still in army uniform, at that time) exchanged greetings with his father from Salzburg while introducing an Austrian choir singing "Silent Night" in their native language. The Vatican Choir recording of "Tu scendi dalle stelle" from the 1955 broadcast was again used, and another excellent number was rendered by a Dutch children's choir from The Hague. Canada was represented by Manécanterie des Petits Chanteurs de la Vierge, from Montreal, singing "Les Anges Dans Nos Campagnes", and the Mormon Tabernacle Choir sang another movement from Handel's "Messiah". Other numbers featured choirs from Minneapolis and Jerusalem in addition to one number by the Insurance Company of North America's chorus. Unlike the previous two years, no children's letters were read on the program. Variety thought that, "Sing with Bing" is developing into a standard Christmas Eve radio offering...Taped in advance, show nevertheless came through with the right holiday flavor...

== Program Four ==
Christmas Eve, 1958 saw the fourth in the series and of the seven carols/songs used, six had been heard at least twice, previously. The sole variation was provided by the first appearance of Kathryn Crosby who duetted with her husband on "Away in a Manger", dedicated to 'Tex', a.k.a. the four month-old Harry Lillis III who "is listening at home to the radio, right now". Canada was represented by the St. George's Cathedral Choir from Kingston, Ontario, and the Mormon Tabernacle Choir again made an appearance, singing "Beautiful Savior". Instead of the usual recording from the Vatican Choir, this year had the Roman Singers of Sacred Music sing an original composition, "Christus Est". Additional music was provided by choirs from Anchorage, Alaska; Sydney, Australia; Albertson, New York; Cannes, France; Honolulu, Hawaii; and the men from the nuclear submarine USS Nautilus. Variety commented, inter alia, "CBS Radio established the Christmas Sing with Bing pattern four years ago and it still holds up as an easy and comfortable programming segment for Yule listening. With Crosby crooning and emceeing around-the-world pickup for Christmas festivities, the hour rolls by in a familiar but still enjoyable way."

== Program Five ==
The Christmas Eve 'Sing' of 1959 featured the usual participants, i.e. Paul Weston's Orchestra and the Norman Luboff Choir were in attendance. A new song was featured by Crosby, "It's Christmas", which was repeated in the show of the following year but strangely enough, although recorded by others, it does not appear to have been used by Crosby in any other context. The program was not previously in circulation but became publicly available in 2021.

== Program Six ==
A change was made to the 'Around the World' theme for the Christmas Eve, 1960 program. The international flavor of season's past was dropped for a stay at home session with Rosemary Clooney, Crosby's regular CBS radio partner, her husband José Ferrer and Crosby's own wife Kathryn. They employed a wide category of Christmas songs from the newer pop standards right down to old-fashioned carols. There was a medley of some of Crosby's Christmas pop hits with Clooney consisting of "Santa Claus Is Coming to Town", "Rudolph the Red-Nosed Reindeer" and "Here Comes Santa Claus" and a rendition of "The Twelve Days of Christmas" by the entire cast. Ferrer added a reading of "Yes, Virginia, there is a Santa Claus" - the 1897 New York Sun editorial.

Variety welcomed the change in format and also commented: "This was the sixth 'Christmas Sing with Bing,' and the Yuletide Eve special is well on its way to becoming an institution which is all for the best since Crosby has that special sense of hominess and belonging that adds an extra kind of warmth to a season when the Christmas song-fests tend to lose their individuality. The 'Sing with Bing’ remains something special, to look forward to each year...Far too many commercials for Insurance Company of North America and pretty hard sell at that. 'Sing with Bing’ being almost an institution it seems about time the commercial aspect of it be accorded appropriately similar treatment."

== Program Seven ==
The seventh broadcast was heard on December 24, 1961 and Kathryn Crosby, Edgar Bergen and Jo Stafford (a late substitute for Rosemary Clooney who was ill) comprised the guest list, alongside the usual cast. Crosby's version of "Joy to the World", from the inaugural show and "Jingle Bells", first heard on the second program, had now become 'regulars'. Crosby and Stafford duetted on a medley of "Santa Claus Is Coming to Town", "Silver Bells" and "Here Comes Santa Claus". Crosby and his wife sang "Rudolph the Red-Nosed Reindeer" together. A clip edited from a 1955 edition of radio's Edgar Bergen/Charlie McCarthy Show was inserted, featuring nine year-old Candice Bergen playing the part of 'Charlie McCarthy's sister'.

== Program Eight ==
The final show in the series was transmitted on December 24, 1962. Earlier that year, Crosby had recorded a new album of Christmas songs entitled "I Wish You a Merry Christmas" and the opportunity was taken to promote this. Kathryn Crosby, Rosemary Clooney and Johnny Mercer covered eight of the fourteen titles on the recently completed album. Crosby started with the title song, "I Wish You a Merry Christmas". Clooney sang "The Littlest Angel" and "Let It Snow! Let It Snow! Let It Snow!" and joined Mercer for "Santa Claus Is Coming to Town". Mercer sang his own individual version of "The Glow-Worm". Crosby joined Clooney and Mercer for "Winter Wonderland".

== End Of Series ==
The program's run ended when Insurance Company of North America declined to continue sponsorship in 1963 and CBS failed to get a new sponsor. A CBS executive said the program might resume in 1964 with a new sponsor, but it was not to be.
