= List of Bing Crosby TV appearances =

This is a listing of the most important television appearances by the entertainer Bing Crosby.

== Background ==
Somewhat reluctantly, in 1954, Bing Crosby had started making television appearances, which were usually filmed in advance. He had been concerned about over-exposure, saying, "I do think this: anybody who goes into TV should be sparing in how much work he does. No entertainer who's in everyone's home once a week can survive very long. His welcome can't be stretched that far. If a new motion picture of mine were released each week for fifty-two weeks—or even for thirty-nine weeks—I soon wouldn't have many friends coming to the theaters to see me. And they'd drop the flap on me at home, too. They'd weary of my mannerisms, my voice, my face."

In 1954, Crosby's radio show had reduced in status from a major weekly program to a daily fifteen-minute show, but after the success of the film High Society and hit records such as "True Love" and "Around the World," he was tempted to become more heavily involved in television. The big breakthrough came in 1957 with the live, award-winning "Edsel Show." Afterwards, he settled into a routine of making at least two television specials each year, but he never really attempted to dominate the sector as he had other media. He eschewed a weekly variety series while singers such as Perry Como, and later, Andy Williams, embraced such exposure enthusiastically, with considerable benefits accruing to their record sales and to their long-term images.

Crosby was especially closely associated with ABC's variety show The Hollywood Palace. He was the show's first and most frequent guest host, and appeared annually on its Christmas edition with his wife Kathryn and his younger children. The coverage of his annual golf tournament gave him regular exposure as did his appearances on The American Sportsman program. He did try his hand with a weekly sit-com series in 1964–65, but this was not renewed after the first season.

Crosby's last TV appearance was a Christmas special taped in London in September 1977 and aired just weeks after his death. It was on this special that Crosby recorded a duet of "The Little Drummer Boy" and "Peace on Earth" with rock star David Bowie. It was released in 1982 as a single 45-rpm record and reached No.3 in the UK singles charts. It has since become a staple of holiday radio, and the final popular hit of Crosby's career. At the end of the century, TV Guide listed the Crosby–Bowie duet as one of the 25 most memorable musical moments of 20th-century television.

== Crosby's main television appearances as host ==
Original airdate	Title	Principal guests
January 3, 1954	The Bing Crosby Show	Jack Benny, Sheree North
April 25, 1954	The Bing Crosby Show	Joanne Gilbert and The Wiere Brothers
March 10, 1956	High Tor	Julie Andrews, Everett Sloane, Nancy Olson
October 13, 1957	The Edsel Show	Frank Sinatra, Louis Armstrong, Rosemary Clooney
October 1, 1958	The Bing Crosby Show for Oldsmobile	Dean Martin, Patti Page, Mahalia Jackson
March 2, 1959	The Bing Crosby Show for Oldsmobile	Jo Stafford, James Garner, Dean Martin
September 29, 1959	The Bing Crosby Show for Oldsmobile	Frank Sinatra, Louis Armstrong, Peggy Lee
February 29, 1960	The Bing Crosby Show for Oldsmobile	Perry Como, The Three Crosby Brothers, Sandy Stewart
October 5, 1960	The Bing Crosby Show for Oldsmobile	Carol Lawrence, Rosemary Clooney, Johnny Mercer, The Three Crosby Brothers
March 20, 1961	The Bing Crosby Show for Oldsmobile	Maurice Chevalier, Carol Lawrence
December 11, 1961	The Bing Crosby Show	Bob Hope, Shirley Bassey, Terry-Thomas, Dave King, Marion Ryan
May 14, 1962	The Bing Crosby Show	Bob Hope, Edie Adams, Gary Crosby, Smothers Brothers
December 24, 1962	The Bing Crosby Show for Clairol	Mary Martin, André Previn
November 7, 1963	The Bing Crosby Show	Caterina Valente, Buddy Ebsen, The Young Americans
1964-1970	The Hollywood Palace	Various
February 15, 1964	The Bing Crosby Show for Lever Brothers	Frank Sinatra, Dean Martin, Bob Hope, Rosemary Clooney, Kathryn Crosby, Peter Gennaro
September 13, 1964	ABC's Wide World of Entertainment	Mickey Rooney, David Janssen, Jimmy Dean, Lawrence Welk
1964-1965	The Bing Crosby Show	Beverly Garland, Frank McHugh and many guest stars
March 10, 1965	The Grand Award of Sports	John Glenn, Kathryn Crosby
1967- 1976	The American Sportsman	Phil Harris
March 14, 1967	A Little Bit of Irish	Milo O'Shea, Kathryn Crosby
1968-1977	Bing Crosby National Pro-Am	
October 23, 1968	The Bing Crosby Special	Bob Hope, Diana Ross and The Supremes, José Feliciano, Stella Stevens, Dorothy Lamour
February 15, 1969	Feelin' Groovy at Marine World	Anissa Jones, The Rascals, Kathryn Crosby
December 17, 1969	Bing & Carol - Together Again for the First Time	Carol Burnett, Juliet Prowse, Roy Clark
March 31, 1970	Goldilocks	Kathryn Crosby, Mary Crosby, Nathaniel Crosby, Paul Winchell, Avery Schreiber
April 13, 1970	Bing Crosby - Cooling It	Dean Martin, Flip Wilson, Bernadette Peters
December 16, 1970	Bing Crosby's Christmas Show for the Bell System Family Theatre	Melba Moore, Jack Wild, The Doodletown Pipers, The Crosby Family
January 19, 1971	Dr. Cook's Garden	Frank Converse, Blythe Danner
December 14, 1971	Bing Crosby and the Sounds of Christmas	Robert Goulet, Mary Costa, Mitchell Singing Boys, Kathryn Crosby and family
February 27, 1972	Bing Crosby and Friends	Bob Hope, Pearl Bailey, Carol Burnett
December 10, 1972	Christmas with the Bing Crosbys	Sally Struthers, David Hartman, Edward Villella, Kathryn Crosby and family
December 9, 1973	Bing Crosby's Sun Valley Christmas Show	John Misha Petkevich, John Byner, Michael Landon, Connie Stevens, Kathryn Crosby and family
October 9, 1974	Bing Crosby and His Friends	Bob Hope, Pearl Bailey, Sandy Duncan
December 15, 1974	Christmas with the Bing Crosbys	Mac Davis, Karen Valentine, Kathryn Crosby and family
December 3, 1975	Merry Christmas Fred, from the Crosbys	Fred Astaire, The Young Americans, Joe Bushkin, Kathryn Crosby and family
March 26, 1976	Bell Telephone Jubilee	Liza Minnelli, Ben Vereen, Joel Grey, Marvin Hamlisch, Roy Clark, Steve Lawrence and Eydie Gormé
December 1, 1976	Bing Crosby's White Christmas	Jackie Gleason, Bernadette Peters, Kathryn Crosby and family
March 20, 1977	Bing - A 50th Anniversary Gala	Bob Hope, Rosemary Clooney, Pearl Bailey, Bette Midler, Mills Brothers, Paul Anka, Kathryn Crosby and family
August 27, 1977	Bing in Norway	Harry Crosby
November 30, 1977	Bing Crosby's Merrie Olde Christmas	Twiggy, Ron Moody, Stanley Baxter, David Bowie, Kathryn Crosby and family

== Significant guest appearances ==
Original airdate	Title	Other guests
December 19, 1948	Philco Playhouse - A Christmas Carol	As an epilogue, Crosby sang Silent Night in a filmed insert with The Bob Mitchell Boys' Choir
June 21, 1952	Olympic Fund Telethon	Dorothy Lamour, Frank Sinatra, Abbott and Costello, Burns and Allen, Martin and Lewis, Liberace, Paul Douglas, Ezio Pinza, Phil Harris, Edward G. Robinson
March 21, 1954	The Jack Benny Show	George Burns, Bob Hope, Eddie ''Rochester'' Anderson
December 3, 1954	Person to Person	Interviewed by Edward R. Murrow
November 11, 1956	The Ed Sullivan Show	Phil Silvers, Marcel Marceau, Julie Andrews, Louis Armstrong and Kate Smith
January 22, 1957	The Phil Silvers Show - Sgt. Bilko Presents Bing Crosby	
December 20, 1957	Happy Holidays with Bing & Frank	Frank Sinatra show
March 2, 1958	The Bob Hope Show	Anita Ekberg, Natalie Wood and Robert Wagner
November 22, 1958	The Dean Martin Show for Timex	Phil Harris, The Treniers
October 19, 1959	The Frank Sinatra Timex Show	Dean Martin, Mitzi Gaynor, Jimmy Durante
March 16, 1960	Perry Como's Kraft Music Hall	Genevieve, Peter Gennaro
August 26, 1961	A Big Night Out with Peggy Lee	David Kossoff, Jimmy Van Heusen, Sammy Cahn
April 3, 1962	Picture Parade	Bob Hope
October 24, 1962	The Bob Hope Show	Juliet Prowse, Lucille Ball
February 17, 1963	The Dinah Shore Show	Al Hirt, Bud & Travis
December 13, 1963	The Bob Hope Comedy Hour	Jack Benny, Danny Thomas, Juliet Prowse.
October 6, 1964	The Bell Telephone Hour	Burl Ives, McGuire Sisters, Grant Johannesen
June 27, 1965	The Eamonn Andrews Show	Spike Milligan, Cilla Black, Patrick Campbell, Harry H. Corbett
July 6, 1965	Late Night Line-Up	Interviewed by Joan Bakewell
December 15, 1965	The Bob Hope Comedy Special	Jack Benny, Nancy Wilson, Janet Leigh
January 6, 1966	Telescope	Interviewed by Fletcher Markle
March 27, 1966	Timmy's Easter Parade of Stars (Canada) (aka The Easter Seal Show)	Robbie Lane and the Disciples, Juliette, Kathryn Crosby
April 20, 1966	The Road to Lebanon (A Danny Thomas Special)	Hugh Downs, Claudine Auger, Sheldon Leonard, Bob Hope.
May 1, 1966	The Magic of Broadcasting	John Scott Trotter, Sheldon Leonard, Diane Sherry, Kerry McLane, Rod Serling, Arthur Godfrey, Lucille Ball
October 30, 1966	The Andy Williams Show	The Young Americans, Tennessee Ernie Ford, Kate Smith
November 16, 1966	The Bob Hope Chrysler Comedy Special	Bach-Yen
April 13, 1967	The Dean Martin Show	Rowan & Martin, Don Cherry, Polly Bergen
October 9, 1967	The Danny Thomas Hour - ‘The Demon under the Bed'	George Maharis, Joan Collins, Mary Frances Crosby
October 19, 1967	The Dean Martin Show	The Golddiggers, Lena Horne, Dom DeLuise
October 25, 1967	The Joey Bishop Show	Dorothy Lamour, Matt Monro, Regis Philbin, Kathryn Crosby
November 25, 1967	The Jackie Gleason Show	Alan King, Liberace
February 12, 1968	The Bob Hope Variety Special	Barbara Eden, Pearl Bailey
May 5, 1968	The Ed Sullivan Show - A Tribute to Irving Berlin	The Fred Waring Glee Club, Robert Goulet, Diana Ross & The Supremes, Ethel Merman, Peter Gennaro, Bob Hope
February 17, 1969	Chrysler Presents The Bob Hope Special	Lisa Miller, Diana Ross & The Supremes, Martha Raye, George Burns
October 4, 1969	The Jackie Gleason Show - The Honeymooners In Hollywood	Art Carney
November 6, 1969	The Dean Martin Show	Jack Gilford, Eva Gabor, Dom DeLuise
November 10, 1969	The Carol Burnett Show	Dan Rowan, Dick Martin, Ella Fitzgerald
February 16, 1970	The Bob Hope Chrysler Special	Oleg Cassini, Johnny Carson, Johnny Cash, Raquel Welch, Ray Bolger
November 29, 1970	The John Wayne TV Special - Swing Out, Sweet Land	Ann-Margret, Lucille Ball, Jack Benny, Dan Blocker, Glen Campbell, Johnny Cash, and many more
January 7, 1971	The Flip Wilson Show	David Steinberg, The Supremes
January 23, 1971	The Pearl Bailey Show	Andy Williams, Louis Armstrong
February 10, 1971	The David Frost Show	Louis Armstrong
February 15, 1971	Chrysler Presents The Bob Hope Special	Jerry Colonna, Teresa Graves, Jo Anne Worley, Petula Clark
March 18, 1971	Ver-r-r-ry Interesting	Arte Johnson (host), Peter Marshall, Nancy Kulp, Joe Flynn, Elke Sommer, Billy De Wolfe
October 7, 1971	The Dean Martin Show	Rip Taylor, Richard Castellano, Lou Jacobi, Kay Medford
November 29, 1971	Monsanto Presents Mancini	Hoagy Carmichael, Michael Landon, Sérgio Mendes & Brasil ‘66
January 3, 1972	The Merv Griffin Show	Bob Hope, Dorothy Lamour, David Butler
March 15, 1972	The Carol Burnett Show	Paul Lynde, Harvey Korman, Vicki Lawrence, Lyle Waggoner
March 16, 1972	The Flip Wilson Show	Tim Conway, Melba Moore
December 23, 1972	The Parkinson Show	
February 22, 1975	Grandstand	
July 24, 1975	Top of the Pops	
July 25, 1975	Today	Thames TV, London program - interviewed by Llew Gardiner
July 25, 1975	The Merv Griffin Show	Rich Little
August 30, 1975	Parkinson	
September 4, 1975	The Mike Douglas Show	Kathryn Crosby
September 14, 1975	Stars on Sunday	
September 24, 1975	The Vera Lynn Show	Trini Lopez
October 12, 1975	Stars on Sunday	
October 15, 1975	The Tonight Show Starring Johnny Carson	Don Rickles, Bob Hope, John Wayne
October 24, 1975	Texaco Presents - A Quarter Century Of Bob Hope On Television	John Wayne, Frank Sinatra
October 28, 1975	The Mike Douglas Show - Kathryn and Bing at Home	Kathryn Crosby
November 12, 1975	Dinah!	Pat Boone, Phil Harris
November 16, 1975	Stars on Sunday	
December 14, 1975	Stars on Sunday	
January 27, 1976	International Pro-Celebrity Golf	Tom Weiskopf, Peter Oosterhuis, Val Doonican
March 5, 1976	The Tonight Show Starring Johnny Carson	Ray Bolger, Marvin Hamlisch, Burt Mustin
April 5, 1976	The Rich Little Show	Bob Hope (cameo)
April 12, 1976	The Bob Hope Olympic Benefit	Shirley Jones, Lynn Anderson, René Simard, Freddie Prinze
December 3, 1976	The Joe Franklin Show WOR-TV	Arthur Tracy, Kathryn Crosby
December 3, 1976	Bing with Pat - A Look at a Legend	Interviewed by Pat Collins
December 6, 1976	Today	Interviewed by Gene Shalit
December 6, 1976	An Hour with Bing & Kathryn Crosby - AM New York	Kathryn Crosby - Interviewed by Stanley Siegel
December 10, 1976	Good Morning America	Kathryn Crosby
January 12, 1977	International Pro-Celebrity Golf	Johnny Miller, Tony Jacklin, Peter Alliss, Sean Connery
May 31, 1977	Barbara Walters Special	
