= Loulie Jean Norman =

American opera singer

- Born: March 12, 1913; Birmingham, Alabama, U.S.
- Died: August 2, 2005 (aged 92) Studio City, California, U.S.
- Genres: Opera
- Occupation: Singer
- Instrument: Vocals
- Formerly of: Ray Conniff Singers

Loulie Jean Norman (March 12, 1913 - August 2, 2005) was a coloratura soprano who worked with arranger Gordon Jenkins. Jenkins and Norman collaborated on a number of albums. Norman was also a member of The Rhythmaires and the Ray Conniff Singers.

== Career ==
Norman was born in Birmingham, Alabama. During her adolescence in Birmingham at Phillips High School, and later at Birmingham–Southern College, it became apparent that she was a gifted soprano with a four-octave range. Initially, she wanted to pursue opera, but she decided to move to New York to try for a career as a radio singer. Her beauty led to modeling jobs and, in 1936, she joined The Rhythm Singers on Kay Thompson’s Chesterfield Program. She married naval pilot Norman Price and eventually moved to Los Angeles where they raised four children. In 1940, Norman was selected as the summer replacement for Dinah Shore on the NBC radio program The Chamber Music Society of Lower Basin Street.

Norman became a member of the successful singing group, The Campus Kids, who worked with Kay Kyser. Another member of the group was Judd Conlon and he formed a new group called The Rhythmaires which began as backing singers on Bing Crosby’s Philco show. Crosby singled Norman out several times on radio for solo passages which required an obbligato. She was once introduced by him as "The Lorelei from Birmingham, Alabama" and another time as "The Hartz Mountain Canary." A favorite standard of Crosby's, Whispering Hope, was reprised on his Chesterfield show with his brother Bob Crosby, and Norman was given the role of performing their sister Catherine’s part.

Norman appeared as a member of The Mel-Tones on Mel Torme’s recording of California Suite, and many popular arrangers and conductors used her on their albums. She recorded with Sam Cooke and provided the voice of The Future on Frank Sinatra's Trilogy album.

Norman contributed to several films: The Big Hangover, Dream Wife, G.I. Blues, Blue Hawaii (in which she sang with Elvis Presley on Moonlight Swim), Too Late Blues, and A Boy Named Charlie Brown. Jerry Lewis secured her for the role of the Princess for the cast of the soundtrack album of Cinderfella.

Her television credits included frequent appearances on The Dinah Shore Show, The Dean Martin Show, and The Carol Burnett Show. Norman delivered the non-lexical vocables over Alexander Courage's opening theme song for the first season of Star Trek. The music was remixed without Norman’s voice for the show’s second and third season so the producers could avoid paying her royalties.

== Other significant singing roles ==
During the 1960s, she recorded as a member of various easy-listening choral groups, most notably the Ray Conniff Singers.

Norman voiced Penelope Pinfeather in Melody and Toot, Whistle, Plunk and Boom. She was a member of an all-female singing group, the G-6, with Henry Mancini's wife.

== Death ==
Norman died on August 2, 2005, in Studio City, California.
