= Roger Beatty =

American director, screenwriter, and stage manager (1933–2020)

- Born: January 24, 1933; Los Angeles, California, U.S.
- Died: April 6, 2020 (aged 87); Palm Desert, California, U.S.
- Occupations: Director, screenwriter
- Years active: 1966–1988

Roger Beatty (January 24, 1933 – April 6, 2020) was an American director and screenwriter.

After serving in the US Coast Guard for three years, Beatty began his television career in 1956, working on The Bing Crosby Show. (Note: The sources cited here, as of July 2024, all state that Beatty began his career in television in 1956 with The Bing Crosby Show. There were several radio and television programs hosted by Crosby, including a radio program that aired in 1956, and Crosby made television appearances in 1956, but no sources could be found for a television program named The Bing Crosby Show in that year.) He later worked on The Danny Kaye Show, Insight and The Red Skelton Hour. Beatty made his directorial debut on The Carol Burnett Show as an associate director. He also wrote for the show throughout its run, winning five Primetime Emmy Awards for his writing on the show.

Later in his career, Beatty directed the television film Of Thee I Sing, with Dave Powers and Dick Hall. Beatty retired in 1988, last directing on the television series Mama's Family.

Beatty died on April 6, 2020 of prostate cancer at his home in Palm Desert, California, at the age of 87.
