= The Bing Crosby Show (TV special) =

- Genre: Music
- Written by: Bill Morrow
- Directed by: Fred de Cordova
- Starring: Bing Crosby, Jack Benny and Sheree North
- Country of origin: United States
- Original language: English

Production
- Producer: Bill Morrow
- Camera setup: William C. Mellor
- Running time: 26 minutes

Original release
- Network: CBS
- Release: January 3, 1954

The Bing Crosby Show is a 1954 American television special. Bing Crosby's first television special, it was directed by Fred de Cordova, it originally aired in the United States on January 3, 1954. Guest stars included Jack Benny and Sheree North, with Ken Carpenter as the announcer.

== Background ==
Bing Crosby was slow to become involved in television, unlike rivals such as Perry Como and Frank Sinatra. Bob Hope too was another who embraced the medium early on. Crosby began filming his first “special” in December 1953 for CBS-TV on Stage Three of the General Service Studios in Hollywood. General Electric were the sponsors. Interviewed by Newsweek at the time Crosby said, “I’ve always felt television is just like movies, but it’s in the home. I wouldn’t want to be in anybody’s home too often, and you wouldn’t want to see a movie starring the same person every week.” The 30-minute show was transmitted on January 3, 1954, and was preceded by a major publicity drive.

== The show ==
The show opened with Bing welcoming the viewers and then going into a dance routine as he sang “Y’all Come”. He then segued in to a song – “It Had to be You” – accompanied only by Buddy Cole on the piano. The next scene showed visitors touring the television studio and being joined by Jack Benny who is escorting Sheree North. Jack is concerned about Crosby being nervous and when he joins Bing, he tries to calm him down despite Crosby obviously being utterly relaxed. Bing then sings “Changing Partners” and is followed by Sheree North doing a raunchy burlesque dance which drew some press criticism. To conclude the show Bing sings “I Love Paris” against a city rooftop backdrop and is joined by Barbara Logan who purports to be walking through the city on her way to Ohrbach's for a fashion show.

== Reception ==
Critics generally liked the show with Daily Variety saying: “That old charmer, head of the Crosby clan, finally showed his face around television. On his own show, that is. The millions who made up the vast welcoming committee must’ve shared the same thought - he was well worth sticking around for. One word description of his coming out party: Socko!” Others were less enthusiastic with Billboard stating “It’s difficult to believe that the show was produced by the same men responsible for his delightfully informal radio airers.” Some would have preferred a “live” Crosby instead of the filmed version. The Los Angeles Times was unhappy with the use of a laugh-track.

Crosby filmed another special for General Electric which was shown in April 1954 and he then virtually avoided television until 1957.

== See also ==
- List of Bing Crosby TV appearances
