= Melody (1953 film) =

- Directed by: Ward Kimball; Charles A. Nichols
- Story by: Dick Huemer
- Produced by: Walt Disney
- Starring: Bill Thompson; Loulie Jean Norman; Harry Stanton; Gloria Wood
- Music by: Joseph Dubin (music); Sonny Burke; Paul Webster (songs)
- Animation by: Ward Kimball; Julius Svendsen; Marc Davis; Harvey Toombs; Hal Ambro; Marvin Woodward
- Color process: Technicolor
- Production company: Walt Disney Productions
- Distributed by: RKO Radio Pictures
- Release date: May 28, 1953
- Running time: 10 minutes (one reel)
- Country: United States
- Language: English

Melody is an American animated short film produced by Walt Disney Productions and directed by Ward Kimball and Charles A. Nichols. Originally released on May 28, 1953, this film was the first in a proposed series of animated cartoon shorts teaching the principles of music, called Adventures in Music. Only one other entry in the series was produced, Toot, Whistle, Plunk and Boom, which was released later that same year, winning an Academy Award for Best Short Subject (Cartoons) the following year.

Walt Disney was always a fan of music, and it shows in all of his films. He said: "There's a terrific power to music. You can run any of these pictures and they'd be dragging and boring, but the minute you put music behind them, they have life and validity they don't get any other way".

== Plot ==
Professor Owl instructs his class of birds on how to find melody around them. Professor Owl demonstrates how melodies are assembled by playing a tune on a small piano. Following this, the class flies off to discover the many melodic sounds of nature. The chorus sings about the sounds of nature ("The Bird and the Cricket and the Willow Tree"). Professor Owl notes that the only two creatures that can sing are birds and humans.

The next scene uses melody to illustrate the various stages of a person's life, beginning with "Rock-a-bye Baby" for birth, followed by "The Alphabet Song" for school; "Far Above Cayuga's Waters" for college; "Drink to Me Only with Thine Eyes" for courtship, followed by "Here Comes the Bride (and there goes the groom)". The later stages of life are represented by "Home! Sweet Home!", "Happy Birthday to You", "Silver Threads Among the Gold", "The Old Gray Mare", "Auld Lang Syne" and "Oh, Dem Golden Slippers".

Finally, an example is shown on how a simple melody can be expanded into a symphony: an elaborate version of the simple tune which opened the lesson. The cartoon ends with a reprise of "The Bird and the Cricket and the Willow Tree".

== Cast ==
- Bill Thompson – Professor Owl / Bertie Birdbrain
- Gloria Wood – Suzy Sparrow
- Harry Stanton – Bass Singer in Canoe and Ship
- Loulie Jean Norman – Penelope Pinfeather
- Judd Conlon Chorus - Students

== Releases ==
The first world showing of Melody in public was shown in two Los Angeles theaters on its release day, including the Paramount Theatre.

It was also shown as part of the Disneyland 3D Jamboree at the Fantasyland Theatre hosted by the Mouseketeers from the Mickey Mouse Club from 1956 to 1964. It was shown alongside fellow 3D short Working for Peanuts with Donald Duck and Chip 'n' Dale.

It was released on DVD twice: once on Fantasia 2000 and then on Disney Rarities: Celebrated Shorts, 1920s–1960s.

It was also shown on television twice: once on Mickey's Mouse Tracks episode 27 and on Donald's Quack Attack episode 4.

== Soundtrack ==
Melody soundtrack was released in 1953. One of the songs of the official soundtrack includes "The Bird and the Cricket and the Willow Tree" by Sonny Burke. It was sung by the Disney Studio Chorus over a sequence showing animated birds chirping, crickets rubbing their legs together, and wind blowing through a willow tree. The song has a pleasant tune and lyrics that are simply a list of these musical nature sounds.
