= Forty Boys and a Song =

1941 film

- Directed by: Irving Allen
- Produced by: Gordon Hollingshead
- Starring: Robert Mitchell
- Cinematography: Lester Shorr
- Release date: December 6, 1941
- Running time: 10 minutes
- Country: United States
- Language: English

Forty Boys and a Song is a 1941 American short documentary film about the Robert Mitchell Boys Choir. Directed by Irving Allen, it was nominated for an Academy Award at the 14th Academy Awards for Best Short Subject (One-Reel). The copyright was renewed in 1969. (Note: Under R460053)

== Cast ==
- Robert Mitchell as himself (as Bob Mitchell)
- Ken Carpenter as narrator
