= The Ford Road Show Featuring Bing Crosby =

- Genre: Classic pop
- Running time: 5 minutes
- Country of origin: United States
- Language(s): English
- Home station: CBS
- Starring: Bing Crosby, Buddy Cole and his Trio
- Announcer: Ken Carpenter
- Written by: Bill Morrow
- Directed by: Murdo MacKenzie
- Produced by: Bill Morrow
- Recording studio: Hollywood, U.S.
- Original release: September 2, 1957 – August 31, 1958
- No. of series: 1
- No. of episodes: 286
- Opening theme: “You’re Ahead in a Ford”
- Sponsored by: Ford Motor Company

The Ford Show Featuring Bing Crosby was a 5-minute CBS network radio show broadcast from 1957 to 1958. It included an opening theme, one or two songs by Bing Crosby, commercials by Ken Carpenter, closing theme, and on occasion a guest such as Rosemary Clooney.

== Overview ==
These were not live programs but were taped segments put together by Crosby's editor, Murdo MacKenzie. Bill Morrow wrote the scripts and produced the show; and Ken Carpenter was the commercial announcer. The music was taken from the substantial library of songs recorded with Buddy Cole and His Trio.

The Ford Road Shows were not confined to Bing Crosby exclusively. The advertising technique, devised by the ad agency J. Walter Thompson was to keep Ford cars in front of the public by radio “saturation.” Thus, five-minute segments were sponsored for news and commentary as well as for entertainment. The other Ford Road Shows featured Rosemary Clooney, chit chat by Arthur Godfrey and news by Edward R. Murrow. The Ford sponsorship covered 21 shows a week for a total of $3.5 million. Rosemary Clooney's Road Shows also employed Buddy Cole and His Trio, which later led to a merger of Crosby and Clooney's shows into the Crosby-Clooney programs of 1960-62. The 5-minute programs were scattered through the program day, five days a week. Crosby's program was aired on CBS twice on Sunday, then Monday-Wednesday-Friday and on alternate weeks, Tuesday-Thursday-Saturday.

It is believed that 286 of these shows were produced for the series, which started Monday, September 2, 1957 and ended Sunday, August 31, 1958.
