= Eyvind Earle =

American artist and author (1916–2000)

- Earle, c. 1958
- Born: April 26, 1916; New York City, U.S.
- Died: July 20, 2000 (aged 84); Carmel-by-the-Sea, California, U.S.
- Known for: Painting backgrounds for Disney's classic films
- Spouses: Joan Kennedy (m. 1972)
- Children: 1
- Awards: Winsor McCay Award 1998; Disney Legends 2015
- Website: www.eyvindearle.com

Eyvind Earle (April 26, 1916 – July 20, 2000) was an American artist, author and illustrator, noted for his contribution to the background illustration and styling of Disney's animated films in the 1950s. The Metropolitan Museum of Art, New York, Rahr West Art Museum, Phoenix Art Museum and Arizona State University Art Museum have purchased Earle's works for their permanent collections. His works have also been shown in many one-man exhibitions throughout the world.

== Early life ==
Eyvind Earle was born in New York on April 26, 1916 to General Ferdinand Pinney (F.P.) Earle and Charlotte Kristine Herman, F.P.'s fourth wife. The family moved to Hollywood in 1918, where F.P. worked as a film director and Earle's mother was a piano teacher. The marriage was strained, and Earle's father was heavily abusive toward his mother. A year after the couple's marriage on October 7th 1915, F.P. was reported to have stabbed Charlotte with a pair of scissors while verbally and physically abusing her.

A childhood bout with polio affected muscles on the left side of Earle's face. He began painting when he was 10 years old. Shortly after his artistic start, his parents divorced, leaving Eyvind in his mother's custody for a period of time. During Earle's early teenage years, he and his father traveled to Europe to study art. It was during this trip that Earle held his first solo art show in Paris at the age of 14.

== Career ==
Earle's first New York exhibition was at the Charles Morgan Galleries in 1937. In a 1939 exhibition, the Metropolitan Museum of Art purchased one of his works for its permanent collection. His work at this time was realistic painting.

Starting in 1939 Earle began his long and successful career of selling Christmas cards, that he designed and printed himself for the American Artist Group. Starting out merely as a means of survival, he formed a Christmas card company called "Monroe and Earle" with an old family friend of his. He printed these cards with the help of Everett Ball, with whom he later formed a separate company by the name of "Earle and Ball". He created over 800 designs between 1938 and 1995, and sold more than 300 million copies.

In 1951 he joined Walt Disney Productions as an assistant background painter and received credit for the experimental background painting in the Goofy short, For Whom the Bulls Toil. In 1953 he created the look of Toot, Whistle, Plunk and Boom, a short animated film which won an Academy Award and a Cannes Film Festival Award. He also worked on Peter Pan, Working for Peanuts, Pigs is Pigs, Paul Bunyan, and Lady and the Tramp. He was responsible for the styling, background and colors for the highly acclaimed Sleeping Beauty.

In 1961, Earle completed an 18-minute animated segment of the Nativity story for the Tennessee Ernie Ford hosted television special The Story Of Christmas on NBC.

In 1963, Earle hand-painted a rubber ball to create a globe for Universal Pictures' on-screen logo which was first used in Charade and continued to be used through 1990.

Earle returned to full-time painting in 1966, producing watercolors, oils, sculptures, drawings, scratchboards, and limited-edition serigraphs. Much of this work was not exhibited in his lifetime.

He died of esophageal cancer in 2000.

== Legacy ==
Earle was critically acclaimed by such publications as Time, the Los Angeles Times, The New York Times, The New York World-Telegram, The Art News and The New York Sun.

Earle's work and distinct graphic styling has continued to inspire new generations of artists and animators, serving to influence the look of other animated films. These have included the Disney features Pocahontas and Frozen, as well as the graphic style of Sony Pictures Animation's debut film, Open Season.

The Banner Saga, a video game by developers Stoic, draws heavily from Earle's style and contains a character named after him. He is credited for 'Artistic Inspiration'.

In May 2017 The Walt Disney Family Museum hosted an 8-month original retrospective exhibit: Awaking Beauty: The Art of Eyvind Earle. An accompanying hard cover exhibition catalog was published under the same name ISBN 978-1681882710.

== Selected filmography ==
Year	Title	Notes
1951	Alice in Wonderland	Background artist - uncredited
1953	Peter Pan	Background artist
1953	Working for Peanuts	Background artist
1953	For Whom the Bulls Toil	Background artist
1953	Melody	Color stylist
1953	Toot, Whistle, Plunk and Boom	Color stylist
1954	Grand Canyonscope	Background artist
1955	Lady and the Tramp	Background artist
1956	Jack and Old Mac	Color stylist
1957	The Truth About Mother Goose	Background artist
1958	Paul Bunyan	Color stylist
1959	Rhapsody of Steel	Art department
1959	Sleeping Beauty	Color stylist

== Awards ==
In 1998, Earle was honored at the 26th Annie Awards with the Winsor McCay Award for a lifetime achievement in the art of animation.

In 2015, in a presentation at the D23 Expo in Anaheim, California, Earle was inducted as a Disney Legend. His daughter, Kristin Thompson, accepted on her father's behalf.
