= Grand Canyonscope =

1954 Donald Duck cartoon

- Directed by: C. August Nichols
- Story by: Milt Schaffer; Nick George
- Produced by: Walt Disney
- Starring: Clarence Nash; Bill Thompson
- Music by: Oliver Wallace
- Animation by: John Sibley; Julius Svendsen; Dan MacManus (effects)
- Layouts by: Lance Nolley
- Backgrounds by: Eyvind Earle
- Color process: Technicolor
- Production company: Walt Disney Productions
- Distributed by: Buena Vista Distribution
- Release date: December 23, 1954; (USA)
- Running time: 6:50
- Country: United States
- Language: English

Grand Canyonscope is a Donald Duck animated short released in 1954. It was Disney's second cartoon filmed in CinemaScope (following Toot, Whistle, Plunk and Boom), and was produced to accompany Disney's first CinemaScope film 20,000 Leagues Under the Sea. One joke has J. Audubon Woodlore breaking the fourth wall stating to the tourists in the CinemaScope version, "Uh, spread out, folks, this is CinemaScope" or in the non-CinemaScope version, "Uh, spread out, folks, this is a big canyon." This short was the first Donald Duck cartoon to be distributed by Disney's own distribution company, Buena Vista Distribution, instead of RKO Radio Pictures.

== Plot ==
Donald is taking a tour of the Grand Canyon. Although he just wants to enjoy the whole exhibition, this is made all but impossible by the constant admonishment from the rulebook-wielding tour guide: none other than Ranger J. Audubon Woodlore.

Donald and Woodlore continue to irritate each other — Donald by innocently tripping over various regulations ("Don't drop rocks into the canyon; Don't bother the Americans; Don't yell at Echo Cliff"; You can't be on the tour without a burro to ride"; et al.), and Woodlore by chastising him for it — until Woodlore himself disturbs Louie the Mountain Lion, the last lion seen in these parts since the Civil War. To Woodlore's shock, Louie is, in fact, the same lion. He proceeds to don a Confederate kepi cap and gives chase (after Woodlore's failure to gain his confidence by whistling the Confederate tune Dixie). Woodlore is caught in the middle as Louie chases Donald through the canyon, which results in most of it being destroyed (notably, a number of natural rock formations are smashed).

With all the other tourists having fled, Woodlore sternly — and rather insultingly — demands that both Donald and the lion must restore Grand Canyon to its original state that they ruined; accordingly, he throws them two shovels and yells at them to start digging. Feeling extremely remorseful, Donald and Louie are actually crazy enough to go along with this; they mopingly begin the ponderous task of restoring the Grand Canyon to its former glory.

== Voice cast ==
- Donald Duck: Clarence Nash
- J. Audubon Woodlore: Bill Thompson
- Louie the Mountain Lion: James MacDonald

== Home media ==
The short was remastered and also released on November 11, 2008, on Walt Disney Treasures: The Chronological Donald, Volume Four: 1951–1961.

It was also released as a bonus feature on the DVD release of 20,000 Leagues Under the Sea and was later made available for streaming on Disney+.

== See also ==
- List of Disney animated shorts
- Donald Duck filmography
