= Charles August Nichols =

American film director (1910–1992)

Charles A. Nichols
- Born: Charles August Nichols; September 15, 1910; Milford, Utah, U.S.
- Died: August 23, 1992 (aged 81); Los Angeles, California, U.S.
- Occupation: animator
- Employers: Walt Disney Productions (1937–1961); Hanna-Barbera Productions (1961–1991); Ruby-Spears Enterprises (1980–1990)

Charles August "Nick" Nichols (September 15, 1910 – August 23, 1992) was an American animator and film director, who worked in animation for over 50 years at Walt Disney Animation Studios and Hanna-Barbera. At Disney, he worked on various short subjects and films from the 1940s into the 1950s, including the Academy Award-winning short Toot, Whistle, Plunk and Boom (1953). Nichols co-directed Charlotte's Web (1973) while at Hanna-Barbera.

== Biography ==
Nichols was born in Milford, Utah.

As an animator for Disney, his first credit was on the film Pinocchio, where he was the lead animator for the villainous Coachman. During World War II, Nichols animated several short subjects, including First Aiders (1944) and numerous cartoons involving the character Pluto. The authors of The World Encyclopedia of Cartoons opined Nichols' animation style made Pluto an "even more likable character." Nichols directed Mickey and the Seal (1948) and Morris the Midget Moose (1950). He then animated on the 1951 feature film Alice in Wonderland.

Alongside Ward Kimball, Nichols co-directed two films in 1953: Melody, notable for being the first 3D film at Disney, and Toot, Whistle, Plunk and Boom. The latter earned an Academy Award for Best Animated Short Film. Nichols worked on the anthology series Disneyland during the mid-1950s, tasked with combining new footage made for the series with older productions, such as cartoons and live action segments. Nichols later served as director on the live action series The Mickey Mouse Club.

He became a stalwart at the Hanna-Barbera studio, directing much of their output made between the 1960s and 1980s. Nichols directed the adventure-themed Jonny Quest and Space Ghost in addition to the comedic Quick Draw McGraw, The Jetsons and The Flintstones. In 1966, Nichols served as animation director for The Man Called Flintstone.

Nichols continued directing at Hanna-Barbera during the 1970s, working on Super Friends, Hong Kong Phooey, Goober and the Ghost Chasers, and The Scooby-Doo Show. With Iwao Takamoto, he co-directed the feature-length animated film Charlotte's Web (1973). In a mixed review, The New York Times felt the animation was "uninteresting" but noted the film stayed true to the book on which it was based. Takamoto opined Nichols was an "unsung legend" who rarely got recognition for his work in animation. He was heavily involved in the production of Josie and the Pussycats, alongside Takamoto and Hoyt Curtin.

He is also credited as Nick Nichols on Scooby's All-Stars on ABC (the second-season title of Scooby's All-Star Laff-A-Lympics). During the 1980s, Nichols worked for Ruby-Spears, providing animation direction to ABC Weekend Specials and Alvin and the Chipmunks. In addition, he directed the animated television films Scooby-Doo and the Ghoul School and The Good, the Bad, and Huckleberry Hound (both released in 1988). Near the end of his career, Nichols returned to Disney, working on The New Adventures of Winnie the Pooh, Darkwing Duck, and Goof Troop, the latter of which aired posthumously.

== Filmography ==
=== Film ===
| Year | Title | Role | Notes |
|---|---|---|---|
| 1944 | Springtime for Pluto | director | |
| 1944 | First Aiders | director | |
| 1945 | Dog Watch | director | |
| 1945 | Canine Casanova | director | |
| 1945 | The Legend of Coyote Rock | director | |
| 1945 | Canine Patrol | director | |
| 1946 | Pluto's Kid Brother | director | |
| 1946 | In Dutch | director | |
| 1946 | The Purloined Pup | director | |
| 1946 | A Feather in His Collar | director | |
| 1946 | Bath Day | director | Charles Nichols' first theatrical cartoon without Pluto in it. |
| 1947 | Pluto's Housewarming | director | |
| 1947 | Rescue Dog | director | |
| 1947 | Figaro and Frankie | director | |
| 1947 | Mickey's Delayed Date | director | |
| 1947 | Pluto's Blue Note | director | |
| 1948 | Mickey Down Under | director | |
| 1948 | Bone Bandit | director | |
| 1948 | Pluto's Purchase | director | |
| 1948 | Cat Nap Pluto | director | |
| 1948 | Pluto's Fledgling | director | |
| 1948 | Mickey and the Seal | director | |
| 1949 | Pueblo Pluto | director | |
| 1949 | Pluto's Surprise Package | director | |
| 1949 | Pluto's Sweater | director | |
| 1949 | Bubble Bee | director | |
| 1949 | Sheep Dog | director | |
| 1950 | Pluto's Heart Throb | director | |
| 1950 | Pluto and the Gopher | director | |
| 1950 | Wonder Dog | director | |
| 1950 | Primitive Pluto | director | |
| 1950 | Puss Cafe | director | |
| 1950 | Pests of the West | director | |
| 1950 | Food for Feudin' | director | |
| 1950 | Camp Dog | director | |
| 1950 | Morris the Midget Moose | director | |
| 1951 | Plutopia | director | |
| 1951 | R'coon Dawg | director | |
| 1951 | Cold Turkey | director | |
| 1953 | The Simple Things | director | |
| 1953 | Toot, Whistle, Plunk and Boom | director | |
| 1954 | Grand Canyonscope | director | Charles Nichols' first cartoon starring Donald Duck. First Donald Duck cartoon to be distributed by Buena Vista Distribution. |
| 1956 | How to Have an Accident in the Home | director | Last Donald Duck cartoon in CinemaScope. Charles Nichols' last theatrical cartoon in CinemaScope. |
| 1959 | How to Have an Accident at Work | director | Last Donald Duck cartoon to be directed by Charles Nichols. Charles Nichols' only Donald Duck cartoon not filmed in CinemaScope. |
| 1961 | The Saga of Windwagon Smith | director | |
| 1966 | The Man Called Flintstone | animation director | |
| 1973 | Charlotte's Web | director | |

=== Television ===
| Year | Title | Role | Notes |
|---|---|---|---|
| 1961 | Top Cat | animation director | |
| 1964 | The Magilla Gorilla Show | animation director | |
| 1964 | The Peter Potamus Show | animation director | |
| 1964-1965 | Jonny Quest | animation director | |
| 1966 | Frankenstein Jr. and The Impossibles | animation director | |
| 1966 | Space Ghost | animation director | |
| 1967 | Birdman and the Galaxy Trio | animation director | |
| 1968 | Wacky Races | animation director | |
| 1969 | The Perils of Penelope Pitstop | animation director | |
| 1969 | Dastardly and Muttley in Their Flying Machines | animation director | |
| 1969 | Cattanooga Cats | animation director | |
| 1970 | Josie and the Pussycats | animation director | |
| 1970 | Harlem Globetrotters | animation director | |
| 1973 | Speed Buggy | director | |
| 1973 | Goober and the Ghost Chasers | director | |
| 1973 | The Addams Family | director | |
| 1973 | Super Friends | director | |
| 1973 | Inch High, Private Eye | director | |
| 1974 | Hong Kong Phooey | director | |
| 1974 | Devlin | director | |
| 1974 | Valley of the Dinosaurs | director | |
| 1974 | Partridge Family 2200 A.D. | director | |
| 1974 | Wheelie and the Chopper Bunch | director | |
| 1976 | Clue Club | director | |
| 1976 | The Mumbly Cartoon Show | director | |
| 1976-1977 | Dynomutt, Dog Wonder | director | |
| 1977 | CB Bears | director | |
| 1984 | Dragon's Lair | director | |
| 1986 | Rambo: The Force of Freedom | director | |
| 1986 | Karate Kommandos | director | |
| 1990 | Piggsburg Pigs! | supervising director | |
