= Kraft Music Hall =

Radio variety program

Joe Sinnott's caricature of the Kraft Music Hall (l to r): Orchestra leader John Scott Trotter, Marilyn Maxwell, Bing Crosby and announcer Ken Carpenter. Veteran Marvel Comics artist Sinnott also illustrated the covers of several Crosby albums.

The Kraft Music Hall was a popular old-time radio variety program, featuring top show business entertainers, which aired first on NBC radio from 1933 to 1949.

== Radio ==
The Kraft Program debuted June 26, 1933, as a musical-variety program featuring orchestra leader Paul Whiteman and served to supplement print advertising and in-store displays promoting Kraft products. During its first year the show went through a series of name changes, including Kraft Musical Revue, until it finally settled on Kraft Music Hall in 1934. Whiteman remained the host until December 6, 1935. Ford Bond was the announcer.

Billed as "The King of Jazz", Whiteman was arguably America's first popular music superstar. Whiteman's foresight regarding the coming of the Jazz Age and his decisions to hire the best jazz musicians was a powerful boost for jazz, swing and blues. Though he was prohibited from hiring black performers, he hired arrangers and composers.

Bing Crosby took over as master of ceremonies January 2, 1936. Crosby was host until May 9, 1946. Other entertainers who appeared regularly during Crosby's tenure included Connie Boswell, Victor Borge, and Mary Martin. A review in Billboard magazine commented, "It is a tribute to Bing Crosby, program's highlight, that the Music Hall seems to survive all talent change -- these changes simply pointing up the fact that the show is completely dependent on Crosby."

For the advertising managers at Kraft Foods, it was imperative that advertising and entertainment be kept separate. For this reason, Kraft insisted that an announcer, not cast members, read its commercials. Additionally, Kraft commercials were single-product focused during the radio days, short and to the point in order to keep with Kraft's philosophy that quality entertainment led listeners up to the commercials, dropped them into the commercials, and took them back to the show, as evidenced by the broadcast of June 15, 1944: When Crosby and Marilyn Maxwell finish singing “Take It Easy”, Crosby segues to the ad with, “Check it friends, The Charioteers (the studio chorus) will further demonstrate immediately after my colleague glibly hustles prospective purchasers.” Announcer Ken Carpenter commences a 39-second spot extolling the virtues of Kraft Dinner – “Well, I can tell you of macaroni and cheese that helps you three ways. Saves cooking time, saves shopping time, saves ration points.”

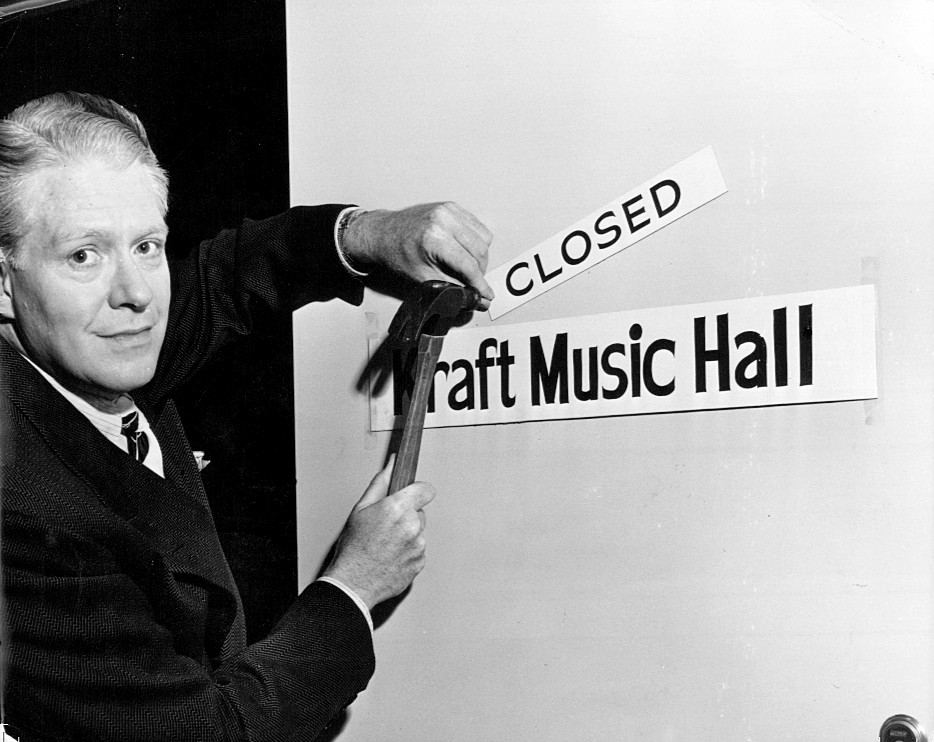
Nelson Eddy marks the end of the radio program on September 22, 1949.

Crosby was the longest-running Kraft Music Hall host, from 1936 through 1946. His casual style and humorous easy-going banter made the show tops with the young "country club" set. The average listener was 21 during this period, compared to the average age of 11 at the movie houses. Intelligent humor and delightful guests made these years some of the greatest. On the show, Crosby rubbed elbows with the likes of Spike Jones, Lucille Ball, The Andrews Sisters, Nat “King” Cole and Peggy Lee. It was during these years on the Kraft Music Hall that Bob Burns popularized his famous “bazooka” instrument (made from a pipe and a funnel), coining the term which was later used by soldiers referring to the 2.75-inch recoilless rifle anti-tank weapon, the bazooka.

Crosby left Kraft Music Hall in 1946 and began hosting his own series, Philco Radio Time; Crosby would continue hosting his own network radio programs until 1962. Kraft Music Hall went through a handful of short-lived hosts. Edward Everett Horton, Eddie Foy and Frank Morgan all hosted from 1945 through 1947. Nelson Eddy took over the summer spots in 1947 and with costar Dorothy Kirsten in 1948 and 1949. The show had a strong supporting cast: pianist-vocalist Ramona, soprano Helen Jepson, tenor Jack Fulton, pianist Roy Bargy and music critic Deems Taylor.

Al Jolson dotted the Kraft Music Hall landscape, first as an occasional guest from 1933 to 1935, then later as the star and host from 1947 to 1949, while his sarcastic pianist and sidekick Oscar Levant piped in with his dry wit. Jolson kept working until shortly before his death in 1950, with these shows as some of his last. Many of the show's recurring jokes and funny remarks were about Jolson's education, his age and his relationships to women. When Jolson returned in October 1947, Variety printed a rave review.

When Decca Records released a Best of Al Jolson double LP, it included several tracks from Kraft Music Hall broadcasts.

== Television ==
Kraft Music Hall made the move to television in 1958, replacing the dramatic anthology series Kraft Television Theatre. Milton Berle hosted during the 1958 season. Beginning with the fall 1959 season, singer Perry Como became the host, and continued until 1967 (as a monthly series from 1963 through '67). During the summer seasons, the show continued with new episodes, with a variety of guest hosts replacing Berle/Como. This rotation of guest hosts became a permanent feature when Como left the series in May 1967 (with the Music Hall returning as a weekly series that fall), and continued until the series finally ended in 1971. During its final years, Friar's Club "Roasts" were occasionally broadcast on this series in place of the usual musically themed episodes. Later, these Roasts appeared as a separate series hosted by Dean Martin.

In 1966, NBC aired a summer replacement show, Kraft Summer Music Hall. It featured John Davidson as host, with a new young comedian named Richard Pryor, and singer Jimmy Boyd.

In 1969, Sandler and Young hosted the Summer Season for 13 weeks with a who’s who of guest entertainers, including Ella Fitzgerald, Sid Caesar, Vincent Price, Lena Horne, Judy Carne, Victor Borge, Carol Lawrence, Cyd Charisse, Barbara Feldon, Norman Wisdom, Terry Thomas, Frank Gorshin, Nancy Sinatra, Kaye Ballard, Dave King, and others
