= Norman Luboff =

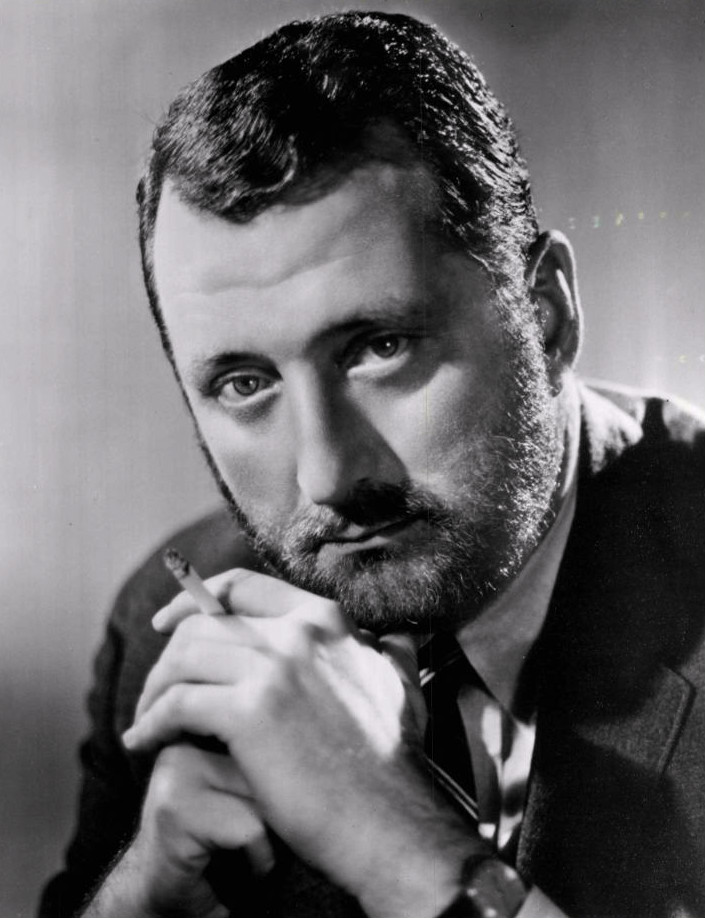
- Luboff in 1963

Background information
- Born: May 14, 1917; Chicago, Illinois, US
- Died: September 22, 1987 (aged 70) Bynum, North Carolina, US
- Occupations: Choir director, music arranger, music publisher
- Years active: 1943–1987
- Labels: Columbia, RCA
- Spouses: Betty Mulliner (m. 6 Nov 1944 - 1966; divorced); Gunilla Marcus (m. 1974-1987; his death)

Norman Luboff (May 14, 1917 – September 22, 1987) was an American choir director, music arranger, and music publisher. Luboff was the founder and conductor of the Norman Luboff Choir, one of the leading choral groups of the 1950s and '60s. He won a Grammy Award in 1961 for Best Performance by a Chorus, and the holiday albums Songs of Christmas (1956) and Christmas with the Norman Luboff Choir (1964) were bestsellers for many years. In addition to recording, Luboff arranged and conducted for radio, television, and film. He also founded Walton Music, a choral music publisher.

== Early years ==
Norman Kador Luboff was born on May 14, 1917 to a working class family in Chicago, Illinois. His music experience began at home, where Luboff, his older brother Avy, and their parents entertained themselves with group singing. He took piano lessons, and participated in his school choir and orchestra. He graduated from high school in 1935.

Luboff entered a music competition and won a scholarship to Central YMCA College, where he graduated with a bachelor's degree in music in 1939. It was there that he became friends with Ray Charles, who like Luboff would go on to a distinguished career as a choir director. After graduation, he continued his studies at the University of Chicago and the American Conservatory of Music, including with noted composer Leo Sowerby. In addition to tutoring, Luboff picked up singing jobs to make ends meet, including as a caroler at Marshall Field's department store during the holidays. He was part of a quartet with his friend Ray Charles, professor Rus Wood, and future singing cowgirl Dale Evans that sang on Chicago radio stations. When he couldn't afford tuition, he sometimes audited classes to further his education.

Luboff served in the United States Army Signal Corps during World War II. After his military service ended in the spring of 1943, he moved to New York City to pursue a career in music.

== Radio, TV, and film ==
In New York City, Ray Charles helped Luboff get an audition with Lyn Murray, an important contractor for singers in the city. He quickly found work singing baritone on various radio programs, including Your Hit Parade. It was there that, in addition to singing, he began to serve as the backup choral director. By 1945, Luboff had quit singing and was writing arrangements and conducting choirs full time.

Luboff moved to Los Angeles in 1948 to become the choral director for The Railroad Hour, a new radio program starring Gordon MacRae. The success of the show led to offers to conduct choirs for Hollywood films. The first film he worked on was Lullaby of Broadway starring Doris Day, released in 1951. Luboff went on to work on more than 80 motion pictures. He provided arrangements for films including The Jazz Singer (1952), The Desert Song (1953), and Rock-A-Bye Baby (1958), and served as a vocal coach for actors like Kirk Douglas in 20,000 Leagues Under the Sea (1954) and Grace Kelly in The Country Girl (1954). He also composed and arranged for television shows like the Bell Telephone Hour, the Dinah Shore Show, and Ford Star Jubilee.

== The Norman Luboff Choir ==
Doris Day also recorded a companion album for Lullaby of Broadway, with Luboff again arranging and conducting the choir as he had for the film, credited as "The Norman Luboff Choir". This began a decade-long relationship with Columbia Records, providing choral accompaniment to Columbia recording artists such as Frankie Laine, Jo Stafford, Paul Weston & his Orchestra, and Frank Sinatra. The Norman Luboff Choir accompanied Jimmy Boyd on his 1952 No. 1 hit "I Saw Mommy Kissing Santa Claus". They also accompanied Bing Crosby on his 1955–1962 series of Christmas Eve radio specials on CBS and the accompanying album for Decca Records, A Christmas Sing with Bing Around the World (1956). Though not credited on the original release, they contributed to three songs on Harry Belafonte's RCA Victor album Calypso (1956), the first LP to sell one million copies.

The Norman Luboff Choir began to release recordings under their own name in 1952, when they produced the 7" EP Christmas Carols. An expanded 10" LP version with the same title was released the following year, along with an album of children's lullabies titled Sweet Dreams. Their first full-length (12") album was Easy to Remember in 1954. They went on to record dozens of albums over the next fifteen years. (Note: Several sources claim that they recorded 75 albums, but this probably includes albums by other artists which feature contributions by the Norman Luboff Choir. Albums with the Norman Luboff Choir as the primary performer only number about half that many. See #Discography) Luboff won a Grammy for Best Performance by a Chorus at the 3rd Annual Grammy Awards for the 1960 album Songs of the Cowboy, beating out his old friend Ray Charles, who was nominated in the same category for Deep Night by the Ray Charles Singers. On February 8, 1960, Luboff was awarded a star for Recording on the Hollywood Walk of Fame at 1620 Vine St.

In 1961, Luboff left Columbia Records and signed with RCA Victor, where he continued to record for the rest of the decade. RCA offered the opportunity to record with larger choruses and orchestras, prompting Luboff to make the change. He was nominated for a Grammy again at the 4th Annual Grammy Awards for This Is Norman Luboff! (1961), losing to the Johnny Mann Singers. The following year he was nominated for Grammies in two categories: Best Performance by a Chorus for A Choral Spectacular (1962), and Best Gospel or Other Religious Recording for Inspiration: Great Music for Chorus and Orchestra (1962) with Leopold Stokowski and the New Symphony Orchestra of London. Neither album won.

The studio choir was an ad hoc group of session singers. The members of the choir varied from one recording session to the next, but the main lineup included Ada Beth Lee, Bernie Parks, Betty Allan, Betty Noyes, Betty Wand, Bill Cole, Bill Lee (as soloist on several tracks), Bob Stevens, Burton A. Dole, Charles Schroeder, Dorothy McCarty, Eileen Wilson, Faye Devlin, Gene Lanham, Gil Mershon, Jackie Allen, Jimmie Joyce, Maxwell Smith, Norma Zimmer, Betty Noyes, Robert Hamlin, Robert Walker, Stewart Bair, Thora Mathiason, Tony Parris, Virginia Rees, William Reeve (as soloist on several tracks) and Thurl Ravenscroft. Norman's wife, Betty Mulliner, also sang with the group and provided the solo vocals for songs on albums such as But Beautiful and Songs of the World Vol. 1 and 2. In 1963, Luboff assembled a touring choir for live performances. This version of the choir consisted of 20-30 regular members who traveled with Luboff to perform concerts, sometimes appearing in more than a hundred shows per year.

By the end of the 1960s, declining record sales and changing musical tastes brought the Norman Luboff Choir's recording career to a close. However, the touring choir continued to perform. Conductor David Dusing succeeded Luboff as director of the choir nine months prior to his death. Dusing led the choir on a tour to Australia in November 1987 just after Luboff died. The choir ceased performing around this time.

== Music publishing ==
Luboff claimed to have composed more than 6000 arrangements during his career. During the 1950s, he founded Walton Music to publish his works. (Note: Sources differ about the founding date. The biography on the old Walton Music website, and other sites that appear to be derived from it, say that it was founded in 1950. However, the biography at the Library of Congress says that it was founded in the late 1950s. The Tom Pickles biography just says that it was founded in the 1950s.) Later it became an important outlet for both domestic and international choral composition, allowing composers such as Waldemar Åhlén of Sweden and Egil Hovland of Norway to have their works published in the United States. After Luboff's death in 1987, his widow Gunilla continued to operate the company until it was sold to GIA Publications in 2013.

In 1965, Luboff published an anthology of folk music that he co-wrote with Win Stracke. Titled Songs of Man: The International Book of Folk Songs, the book details 180 folk songs from around the world with music and illustration.

== Personal life and death ==
One of Luboff's fellow singers on Your Hit Parade was Elizabeth "Betty" Mulliner. Born November 15, 1916 in upstate New York, she attended Syracuse University before moving to New York City. Luboff and Mulliner began dating, and they were married on November 6, 1944. Betty continued to sing on radio, including on Your Hit Parade and The Railroad Hour. She also sang soprano in the Norman Luboff Choir and as a session singer in Los Angeles. She had several recording credits, often under her maiden name, including "Some Day My Prince Will Come" from the 1944 Decca album Selections from Walt Disney’s Feature Production Snow White and the Seven Dwarfs and early Mickey Mouse Club recordings from the 1950s. The couple divorced in the mid-1960s. (Note: Sources differ about the date of their divorce. The Tom Pickles biography says they "...divorced in 1966 after 22 years of marriage.", but Betty Luboff's obituary in The Argonaut says they divorced in 1968.) On February 19, 2006, Betty died in Santa Monica, California.

Norman and Betty had two children: Peter Luboff born 1945 and Bettina "Tina" Luboff, born 1948. Peter Luboff, a 1967 graduate of Dartmouth College, was a singer-songwriter who co-wrote songs for Patti LaBelle and Bobby Womack in the 1980s. He died at the age of 77 from Parkinson's disease on May 21, 2023 and was survived by his wife, Pat, his daughter, Pepper, his son, Paladin, and grandchildren.

As his recording career diminished in the late 1960s, Luboff continued to find himself in demand as a guest conductor and educator, participating in choral workshops at home and abroad, especially in the Scandinavian countries. During a trip to Sweden in 1971 to conduct the Swedish Radio Choir, Swedish public broadcaster Sveriges Television produced a documentary about his visit titled Norman Luboff i Sverige (Norman Luboff in Sweden). Luboff became acquainted with the producer of the program, Gunilla Marcus, and two and a half years later they were married.

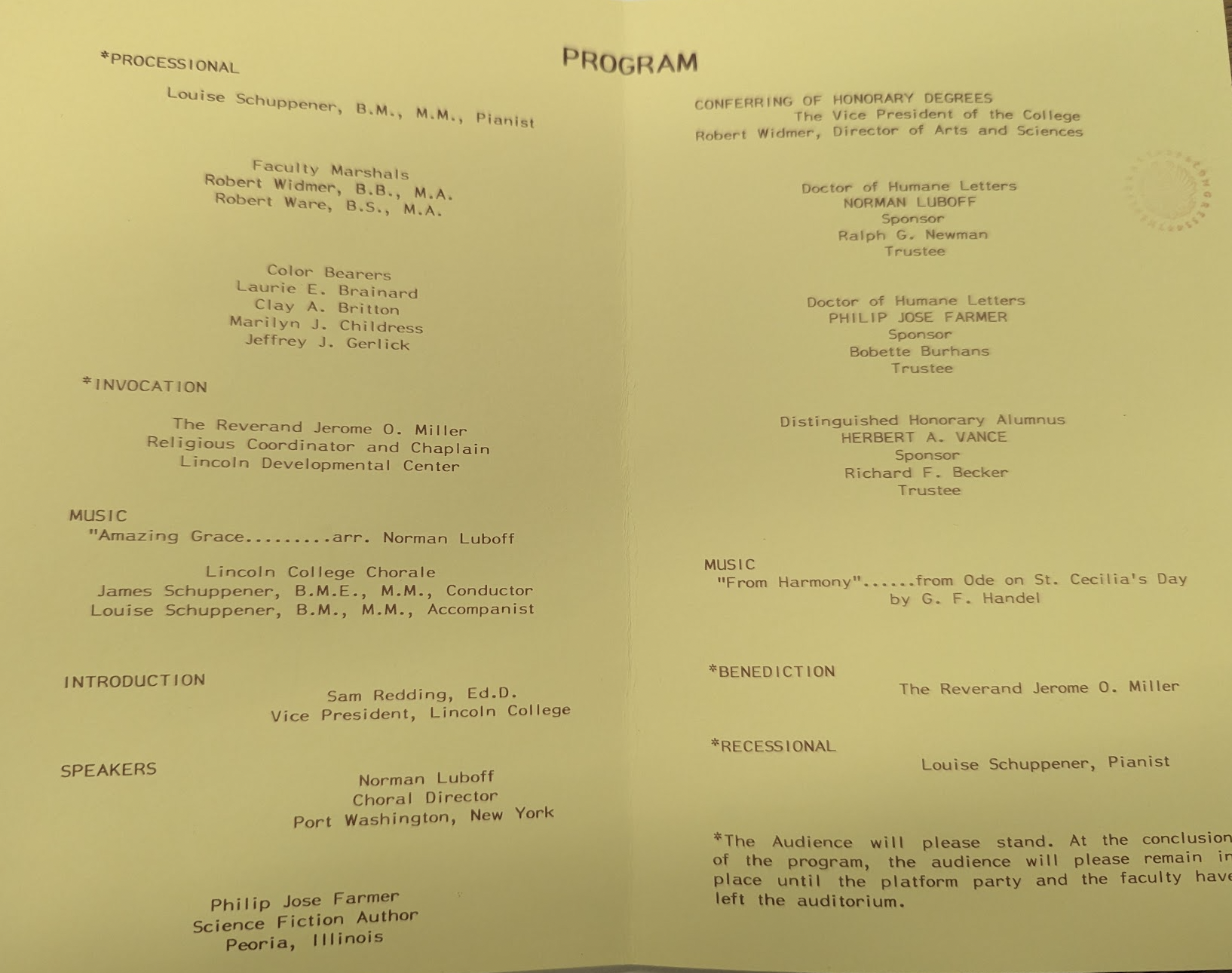
The program from Lincoln College's 117th Charter Day Convocation on February 14, 1982. Science fiction author Philip José Farmer and choral conductor Norman Luboff were awarded honorary doctorates.

Luboff was awarded an Honorary Doctor of Humane Letters from Lincoln College during the 117th Charter Day Convocation on February 14, 1982. Also granted an honorary degree that day was science-fiction author Philp José Farmer.

Luboff and Gunilla moved from New York to Bynum, North Carolina, in 1985 to enjoy the rural lifestyle. It was there that Luboff died on September 22, 1987, ten months after being diagnosed with lung cancer. He was cremated, and his wife took his ashes to Gotland, Sweden, where they had a summer home.

Much of his personal archives were donated to the Library of Congress in 1993 as the Norman Luboff Papers.

== Discography ==
List of albums by the Norman Luboff Choir
Title	Year	Label	Catalog No.		Peak chart	Notes
Title	Year	Label	Mono	Stereo	Peak chart	Notes
Sweet Dreams	1953	Columbia	CL-6252	—	—	10" LP
Christmas Carols	1953	Columbia	CL-6272	—	—	10" LP; Includes material from 1952 7" EP Christmas Carols (B-1511)
Easy to Remember	1954	Columbia	CL-545	—	—	
Songs of the West	1955	Columbia	CL-657	CS-8329 (Note: Reissued November 1960 in electronically rechanneled stereo)	14	
Songs of the South	1956	Columbia	CL-860	CS-9045 (Note: Reissued September 1964 in electronically rechanneled stereo)	19	
Just a Song	1956	Columbia	CL-890	—	—	
Songs of Christmas	1956	Columbia	CL-926	CS-8846 (Note: Reissued October 1963 in electronically rechanneled stereo)	22	Includes material from 1953 10" LP Christmas Carols (CL-6272)
Songs of the Sea	1957	Columbia	CL-948	CS-8775 (Note: Reissued March 1963 in electronically rechanneled stereo)	—	
Calypso Holiday	1957	Columbia	CL-1000	—	19	
The Hymnal	1958	Columbia	CL-1106	—	—	
Broadway	1958	Columbia	CL-1110	CS-8052	—	First true stereo release
Sleepy Time Songs / Wide Awake Songs	1958	Columbia	CL-1179	—	—	
Songs of the World, Vol. 1	1958	Columbia	CL-1218	CS-8140	—	Also released as a double album (C2L-13)
Songs of the World, Vol. 2	1958	Columbia	CL-1219	CS-8141	—	Also released as a double album (C2L-13)
Reverie	1959	Columbia	CL-1256	CS-8074	—	
But Beautiful	1959	Columbia	CL-1296	CS-8114	—	
Songs of the British Isles	1959	Columbia	CL-1348	CS-8157	—	
Songs of the Caribbean	1959	Columbia	CL-1357	—	—	
Moments to Remember	1960	Columbia	CL-1423	CS-8220	—	
Songs of the Cowboy	1960	Columbia	CL-1487	CS-8278	—	Grammy winner
This is Norman Luboff!	1961	RCA Victor	LPM 2342	LSP 2342	—	Grammy nominated
Apasionada	1961	RCA Victor	LPM 2341	LSP 2341	—	
You're My Girl	1961	RCA Victor	LPM 2368	LSP 2368	—	
Sing! It's Good for You	1962	RCA Victor	LPM 2475	LSP 2475	—	
Choral Spectacular	1962	RCA Victor	LPM 2522	LSP 2522	—	Norman Luboff conducting a 100 Voice Chorus and the RCA Victor Symphony Orchestra; Grammy nominated
The Gospel Truth	1962	RCA Victor	LPM 2548	LSP 2548	—	
Inspiration: Great Music for Chorus and Orchestra	1962	RCA Victor	LM 2593	LSC 2593	—	With Leopold Stokowski conducting the New Symphony Orchestra of London; Grammy nominated
Aloha From Norman Luboff	1963	RCA Victor	LPM 2602	LSP 2602	—	
Grand Tour	1963	RCA Victor	LPM 2521	LSP 2521	—	
On the Country-Side	1964	RCA Victor	LPM 2805	LSP 2805	—	
Great Movie Themes	1964	RCA Victor	LPM 2895	LSP 2895	—	
Go Team, Go	1964	RCA Victor	LPM 2924	LSP 2924	—	
Christmas with the Norman Luboff Choir	1964	RCA Victor	LPM 2941	LSP 2941	—	
Blues–Right Now!	1965	RCA Victor	LPM 3312	LSP 3312	—	
Remember	1965	RCA Victor	LPM 3400	LSP 3400	—	
Songs of the Trail	1966	RCA Victor	LPM 3555	LSP 3555	—	
Latin Luboff	1966	RCA Victor	LPM 3637	LSP 3637	—	
Side by Side	1967	RCA Camden	CAL 2129	CAS 2129	—	Final mono release
The Night Before Christmas	1968	Elba Productions	—	none	—	
"Four Walls" and Other Country Classics	1969	RCA Camden	—	CAS 2294	—	
ChristmasSing: A Gift of Carols For One and All	1981	Triangle Records	—	TR-144	—	
"—" denotes a recording that did not chart or was not released in that format.
