= A Christmas Sing with Bing Around the World =

A Christmas Sing with Bing around the World

Live album by Bing Crosby
- Released: December 1956
- Recorded: December 19, 1955
- Genre: Christmas
- Length: 44:42
- Label: Decca

Bing Crosby chronology
High Tor (1956)	A Christmas Sing with Bing around the World (1956)	Anything Goes (1956)

A Christmas Sing with Bing around the World is an album by Bing Crosby. It was released in December, 1956 by Decca Records. It was taken from a radio broadcast on CBS which was transmitted on December 24, 1955. The program was sponsored by the Insurance Company of North America. Paul Weston & his Orchestra supported by the Norman Luboff Choir provided the backing to Crosby's vocals, which were recorded on December 19, 1955. Other vocal contributions came from various parts of the world and had been pre-recorded and inserted into the broadcast as though they were live. The commercials for Insurance Company of North America were not included in the album.

Billboard reviewed the album commenting "one of the solidest holiday packages to come along, a prime candidate for immediate store exposure. Singer brings superb projection to nine out of 19 selected Christmas carols and hymns, with smoothest of assists from Norman Luboff's choir and Paul Weston's work."

Sepia Records included the entire album in their CD "Bing Crosby Through the Years volume ten" which was released in May, 2012.

The success of the first broadcast led to a regular annual series.

== Track listing ==
Side one
No.	Title	Writer(s)	Performer(s)	Length
1.	"Happy Holiday"	Irving Berlin	Paul Weston & his Orchestra, Norman Luboff Choir	1:05
2.	"Joy to the World"	Issac Watts, Lowell Mason	Bing Crosby	2:56
3.	"Hark! The Herald Angels Sing"	Charles Wesley, Felix Mendelssohn	St. Louis Christmas Carols Association Choir	3:04
4.	"White Christmas"	Irving Berlin	Bing Crosby	3:22
5.	"Adeste Fideles"	John Francis Wade	Little Singers of Granby	2:49
6.	"We Three Kings of Orient Are"	John Henry Hopkins Jr.	Mormon Tabernacle Choir	2:31
7.	"The First Nowell"	Traditional	Bing Crosby	2:41
8.	"Carol of the Bells"	Mykola Leontovych, Peter J. Wilhousky	The Voices of Christmas	1:27
9.	"What Christmas Means to Me"		Delores Short	2:19
10.	"Good King Wenceslas"	John Mason Neale; Traditional	Bing Crosby	4:04

Side two
No.	Title	Writer(s)	Performer(s)	Length
1.	"Jesus Sauveur Adorable"	̶	Neuilly Boys Choir	2:44
2.	"Angels We Have Heard on High"	Traditional	Reed Warblers Choir	2:40
3.	"Away in a Manger"	Anonymous, James Ramsey Murray	Bing Crosby	2:07
4.	"Tu scendi dalle stelle"	Alphonsus Maria de' Liguori	The Vatican Choir	2:43
5.	"Deck the Halls"	Thomas Oliphant	Bing Crosby	2:03
6.	"God Rest You Merry, Gentlemen"	Traditional	Dedham Choral Society	2:01
7.	"O Little Town of Bethlehem"	Phillips Brooks, Lewis Redner	Bing Crosby	1:38
8.	"Silent Night"	Franz Xaver Gruber, Joseph Mohr	Bing Crosby	2:03
9.	"Happy Holiday" (reprise)	Irving Berlin	Bing Crosby, Norman Luboff Choir	0:24
