= Working for Peanuts =

1953 Donald Duck cartoon

- Theatrical release poster
- Directed by: Jack Hannah
- Story by: Nick George; Roy Williams
- Produced by: Walt Disney
- Starring: Clarence Nash; James MacDonald; Dessie Flynn
- Music by: Oliver Wallace
- Animation by: Volus Jones; Bill Justice; George Kreisl; Dan MacManus (effects)
- Layouts by: Yale Gracey
- Backgrounds by: Eyvind Earle
- Color process: Technicolor
- Production company: Walt Disney Productions
- Distributed by: RKO Radio Pictures
- Release date: November 11, 1953
- Running time: 6:40
- Country: United States
- Language: English

Working for Peanuts is a 1953 animated short produced by Walt Disney, featuring Donald Duck and Chip 'n' Dale. It is notable for being one of their first shorts filmed in 3D (the first being Adventures in Music: Melody, which was released several months before). The tagline of the film is "Walt Disney's Donald Duck & Chip 'N Dale in their first laugh riot in 3-Dimension".

In 2006, it was remastered for Digital 3D purposes and re-released in 2007 along with the Disney Digital 3-D version of the Walt Disney Animation Studios film Meet the Robinsons.

Working for Peanuts was also showcased a number of times at the Disney theme parks and was used as a teaser 3D cartoon at Walt Disney World's Magic Kingdom, which showcased a 3D film, Magic Journeys, that was sponsored by Kodak.

The title "Working for Peanuts", which is a common expression to indicate earning low wages, is used to allude to the development in the story related to the elephant's peanuts.

== Plot ==
While collecting acorns, Chip and Dale discover a peanut that had been thrown from the nearby zoo. The duo sample the peanut and enjoy its taste. They spot a crowd throwing peanuts at Dolores the Elephant, who is being cared for by Donald Duck.

The chipmunks attempt to steal peanuts while Donald is away, but Dolores discovers Dale. Dale offers Dolores a peanut, but runs off while her eyes are closed. In response, Dolores tricks Dale into throwing his load of peanuts into her mouth by using her trunk as a "branch", then sucks Chip's load out of the tree. The chipmunks retaliate by pulling back a branch on their tree and striking Dolores in the rear. Dolores complains to Donald. Once he notices the chipmunks in the act of theft, Donald uses Dolores' trunk like a vacuum to suck up the stolen peanuts. He then fires the peanuts at them like a machine gun, but runs out of peanuts. The chipmunks retreat into a mouse hole, and Donald, rushing towards them, collides with the wall and is left dazed. The chipmunks observe other animals receiving peanuts. Dale attempts to gather more by imitating a sea lion. A fish is thrown at him instead, and Chip mocks him. Unamused, Dale slaps Chip with the fish.

Dolores notices Donald and snaps him out of his stupor. The two then find the chipmunks dancing in exchange for peanuts. Donald furiously tries to chase the chipmunks out of the zoo. While trying to escape from Donald, Dale trips in a bucket of white paint, covering himself in it. Chip gets an idea. The two cover themselves in the white paint and put themselves in a box, posing as albino chipmunks and instructing Donald to only feed them peanuts.

Donald creates an albino chipmunk exhibit and fills it with peanuts. Dolores provides the chipmunks with a miniature swimming pool. Dale attempts to cannonball in. Chip stops Dale, but not before he inadvertently washes the paint off his bottom half. Dolores alerts Donald, so Dale draws two lines across his body, imitating a pair of suspenders. Donald buys the ruse and he and Dolores walk away. Chip says "We sure fooled him!", to which Dale responds "Yep! Sure did!" and pulls back on his now-real suspenders. Chip looks at the camera and shrugs.

== Voice cast ==
- Donald Duck: Clarence Nash
- Chip: Jimmy MacDonald
- Dale: Dessie Flynn

== Releases ==
- 1953 - theatrical release
- 1956 - as part of "3D Jamboree" (Disneyland).
- 1960 - Walt Disney Presents, episode #6.23: "This Is Your Life, Donald Duck" (TV)
- c. 1983 - Good Morning, Mickey!, episode #8 (TV)
- 1987 - pre-show for "Magic Journeys" at Walt Disney World's Magic Kingdom (theme park).
- c. 1992 - Donald's Quack Attack, episode #44 (TV)
- 1998 - The Ink and Paint Club, episode #1.42: "Goin' to the Zoo" (TV)
- 2006 - as part of the World 3D Film Expo II.
- 2007 - reissued with 3D version of Meet the Robinsons (theatrical).

== Home media ==
The short was released on November 11, 2008 on Walt Disney Treasures: The Chronological Donald, Volume Four: 1951-1961.

Additional releases include:

- 1981 - Mickey Mouse and Donald Duck Cartoon Collections Volume Three (VHS)
- 1987 - Cartoon Classics: Starring Chip 'n Dale (VHS)
- 2005 - Classic Cartoon Favorites: Starring Chip 'n Dale (DVD)

Also, in 2010, Walt Disney Home Entertainment partnered with Mitsubishi Electric to release the "3-D Showcase Disc" Blu-Ray. The disc included the short film "Working For Peanuts", along with previews and clips from Toy Story 3, Alice in Wonderland, A Christmas Carol and Tim Burton's The Nightmare Before Christmas. The disc was not released to general retail and was only available as a part of Mitsubishi's 3D Starter Kit.
