= The Edsel Show =

- Written by: Bill Morrow
- Directed by: Seymour Berns
- Starring: Bing Crosby; Frank Sinatra; Rosemary Clooney; Louis Armstrong; Lindsay Crosby; The Four Preps; Bob Hope
- Narrated by: Warren Hull
- Ending theme: "On the Sunny Side of the Street"
- Country of origin: United States
- Original language: English

Production
- Producer: Bill Morrow
- Camera setup: Multiple
- Running time: 58 minutes
- Production company: Gonzaga University

Original release
- Network: CBS
- Release: October 13, 1957

The Edsel Show was an hour-long television special broadcast live on CBS in the United States on October 13, 1957, intended to promote Ford Motor Company's new Edsel cars. It was a milestone in the long career of entertainer Bing Crosby and is notable as the first CBS entertainment program to be recorded on videotape for rebroadcast in the western part of the country following a live performance for the east coast.

Crosby arranged for this ‘live’ program to be ‘produced’ by his alma mater Gonzaga University in order that the profits, estimated at $250,000, could go to them in a tax efficient way. The program won the Look Magazine TV Award for ‘Best Musical Show’ and was nominated for an Emmy as the “Best Single Program of the Year”.

== Overview ==
The Edsel Show starred Bing Crosby and featured Frank Sinatra, Rosemary Clooney, Louis Armstrong, and Lindsay Crosby, Bing's son, performing with the Four Preps. It also featured an appearance by a "mystery guest", comedian Bob Hope. The show was directed by Seymour Berns, and was written and produced by Bill Morrow. The Orchestra was directed by Toots Camarata. Musical supervision by Buddy Cole with additional arrangements by John Scott Trotter.

During the show's opening musical number, "Now You Has Jazz", Crosby introduces each member of the Armstrong band prior to a brief solo from all. In order: Edmond Hall on clarinet, Trummy Young on trombone, Billy Kyle on piano, Squire Gersh on double bass, and Barrett Deems on drums. Crosby and Armstrong and his band had performed the same song in the 1956 motion picture High Society.

CBS pre-empted its regular-Ford sponsored hour in the Sunday 8pm EST slot, The Ed Sullivan Show, for one evening only. One of the 1957-58 television season's most successful outings, its popularity did not transfer to sales in the Edsel line of automobiles.

Following three decades as a recording artist, this special is frequently cited as marking Bing Crosby's transition to television. It established a format for his subsequent television broadcasts and led to a contract with ABC, under which he agreed to produce two specials annually.

== Soundtrack ==
- "Now You Has Jazz" Bing Crosby and Louis Armstrong
- "Medley" Bing Crosby and Frank Sinatra
- "Road To Morocco" Bing Crosby, Frank Sinatra and Bob Hope
- "I Guess I'll Have to Change My Plan" Rosemary Clooney
- "Boola Boola" The Four Preps
- "Medley" Bing Crosby and Frank Sinatra
- "In the Middle of an Island" Lindsay Crosby
- "The Birth of the Blues" Frank Sinatra and Louis Armstrong
- "Medley" Bing Crosby, Frank Sinatra and Rosemary Clooney
- "On the Sunny Side of the Street" Bing Crosby, Frank Sinatra, Rosemary Clooney and Louis Armstrong

== Reception ==
Variety magazine wrote: “The Edsel Show, a special kick-off for Ford’s new line of cars on tv, was a smooth, fast ride all the way. In fact, without even seeming to try, it shaped up as one of video’s top musical offerings, in the same class as the Mary Martin-Ethel Merman layout several years ago, on the ‘Ford Jubilee’ show. This time, it was the tandem of Bing Crosby and Frank Sinatra, two savvy pros who were at the top of their form. For Crosby, it was his best tv showing to date and for those who remember live radio way back when, Der Bingle generated the same easy charm that was responsible for his long-time run on the AM kilocycles...Crosby’s number with Armstrong and his combo on ‘Now You Has Jazz’ was a crackerjack getaway."

The show had a Trendex rating of 40.8. A Trendex rating represents the percentage of TV homes in fifteen major cities, including New York, that are tuned to the program specified. Trendex telephoned 1,000 homes during each half-hour period.

== Videotape ==
The show was performed at CBS Television City in the afternoon in California and broadcast live in the eastern part of the country. A videotape was made of the performance and was played back three hours later for western audiences. As videotape was a new technology, CBS made a film-based kinescope of the show and played it back alongside the videotape, so that the broadcast could switch to the kinescope if problems were encountered with the tape; there were none.

Videotape was a technology that had interested Crosby for several years. His company, Bing Crosby Enterprises, had investigated several technologies, ultimately investing in Ampex, the first company to demonstrate a practical broadcast-quality videotape system when it unveiled the first 2" Quadruplex videotape machine in 1956. Crosby's interest as a performer was to avoid repeated live performances of the same show for west coast broadcast, the routine on early live network radio. Videotape use on a regular basis was first introduced on the CBS News series Douglas Edwards and the News in November 1956. Today, with no known tape copies of those telecasts in the CBS library or tapes of any programming prior to the fall of 1957, The Edsel Show is believed to be the earliest surviving videotaped television broadcast.

== In popular culture ==
In her autobiography, Girl Singer, Doubleday, 1999, Rosemary Clooney recalled an incident that happened the afternoon of The Edsel Show's telecast:

The show was built around the newest Ford offering, the 1958 Edsel. A new vista of motoring pleasure, unlike any other car you've ever seen. The only Edsel I ever saw was one they gave me to drive while I was rehearsing. I came out of the CBS Building, up those little steps to the street where my purple Edsel was waiting, like the Normandie in drydock. Mr. Ford was right behind me, heading for his Edsel. I opened the door of my car and the handle came off. I turned to him, holding it out to him. "About your car . . ."

== See also ==
- 1957 in television
- An Evening With Fred Astaire
