= The Bing Crosby Show for General Electric =

- Genre: variety
- Running time: 30 minutes
- Country of origin: United States
- Language(s): English
- Syndicates: CBS
- Starring: Bing Crosby; The John Scott Trotter Orchestra; Jud Conlon's Rhythmaires
- Announcer: Ken Carpenter
- Written by: Bill Morrow
- Directed by: Murdo MacKenzie
- Produced by: Bill Morrow
- Recording studio: Hollywood, U.S.
- Other studios: Palm Springs, California
- Original release: October 9, 1952 – May 30, 1954
- No. of series: 2
- No. of episodes: 75
- Opening theme: Where the Blue of the Night (Meets the Gold of the Day) (first season) Unnamed piece of music by Victor Young for series two
- Sponsored by: General Electric

The Bing Crosby Show for General Electric was a 30-minute variety old-time radio program starring entertainer Bing Crosby. The series ran on CBS radio from 1952 to 1954. The series was sponsored by the General Electric company and was usually recorded in Hollywood, although some shows were recorded in Palm Springs. The last seven shows of the first season were broadcast as though they had come from Paris, France, but they had actually been recorded in the US prior to Crosby's departure for Europe.

== Overview ==
Singer and entertainer Bing Crosby had finished a three-year engagement with Chesterfield cigarettes on CBS radio which had ended in June 1952. Crosby remained with CBS and General Electric took over as sponsor for his show. The show was named The Bing Crosby Show for General Electric and premiered on Thursday, October 9, 1952. Notable guest stars and appearances on the series included Frank Sinatra, Jack Benny, Ella Fitzgerald, Connee Boswell, Bob Hope, Dinah Shore, Rosemary Clooney, Peggy Lee, The Bell Sisters and Kay Starr. The competition of television was causing radio audiences to fall away dramatically and the Crosby show had to adapt to this over its two-year run. Crosby is said to have been paid $16,000 per week which made it one of the most expensive shows on radio. This figure also had to cover the cost of staff and guests.

=== Season one ===
The format used for the Chesterfield show was followed with songs and chat. Variety liked the opening show, saying inter alia, “Bing Crosby is back for another semester in radio and this time, flying the General Electric colours. Chesterfield gave him the go-by at the wind up of last season, along with Bob Hope, considering the weekly tab too high. The Hollywood and Vine reports have it that, as with Jack Benny before him, the production, accoutrements and bankroll on Bing’s showcase have been trimmed in keeping with the ‘radio re-appraisal’, if so, GE has grabbed itself a good deal. For there is no perceptible change - so far as the listener is concerned - either in Crosby or his entourage."

The shows continued until July 2, 1953, and the audience share for the season was 6.5 which enabled the program to scrape into twentieth position in the Nielsen ratings. The top show was Amos 'n' Andy with 14.2.

=== Season two ===
The first show of the second season was broadcast on September 27, 1953, the series having been moved to Sunday nights. “Where the Blue of the Night” was replaced as a theme song by an untitled orchestral piece written by Victor Young. Ken Carpenter and the John Scott Trotter Orchestra remained as fixtures. The shows were still being produced by Bill Morrow and Murdo MacKenzie and continued until May 30, 1954. The audience share was 6.0 for the season which earned the show seventh place in the Nielsen ratings. The game show People Are Funny took top position with a rating of only 8.4 confirming that the public had deserted radio for television.

Radical changes had been made to the Crosby broadcast, with most shows being assembled piecemeal and put together for transmission. Usually, audiences were not present and recordings of earlier audience reactions were dubbed in, creating the illusion of a “live” recording. Typically Crosby would spend Sundays recording material for the shows. Expensive guest stars were rarely used and Crosby employed his sons - Gary, Dennis, Phillip and Lindsay - frequently on the show. Jud Conlon's Rhythmaires were not used in this second series and a regular spot was established for the Orchestra to play an instrumental version of a well-known song.

A notable guest however was Frank Sinatra who appeared around the time when he had been nominated as Best Supporting Actor for his role in “From Here to Eternity”.

Whilst the songs and the chat continued, the ‘normal’ commercials were abandoned in favour of several minutes of ‘discussion’ between Crosby and Ken Carpenter, on such heavyweight subjects as ‘Government’, ‘Communism’ and ‘Collectivism’. It was the time when McCarthyism was rife but even so the propaganda must have been hard going for the listeners.

Variety was positive about the opening show, saying, “Sunday is now Bingsday on CBS Radio and no matter where you move him, the loyal will find him. His voice and personality have the magic of the Pied Piper and even without his long-time ‘themer’ (“Blue of the Night’) he'll be fished out of the receiver... General Electric preferred to have cross talk about people rather than “move merchandise".

Billboard was more cautious in its reaction. “Bing Crosby returned to the air this week in good voice and a gay old mood... In a season in which Crosby is due to bow on TV on a somewhat regular basis, it’s worth noting that his current radio show is strictly a radio show, consisting of songs and pleasant chatter. While his zillions of fans would no doubt flock to see him do no more than that, it is nevertheless to be hoped that Bing will pay some attention to develop a really televisable format."

The series ended on May 30, 1954, and its ending was a little confusing. There were 39 shows in the first season for General Electric but only the 36 in the second. The usual ‘discussion’ between Crosby and Ken Carpenter, implied that they were summing up all the previous items of this nature but astonishingly, at the close of the program, Crosby is heard to say, “I hope to see you all again, next week, when our guest will be Miss Rosemary Clooney.” This information was re-iterated by Ken Carpenter in the closing announcements. In fact, it was planned that Gary Crosby would take over with his own show on the following Sunday. The confusion may have been due to Gary Crosby having a motor accident on May 24 and being treated for a lacerated nose and an injured knee. Gary Crosby's debut had to be postponed until June 13 and his radio program replaced his father's on CBS for the summer period of thirteen weeks before Gary began his third year at Stanford.

Bing Crosby had decided not to continue with a weekly radio series and in November 1954, he returned to the airwaves with a five-nights a week 15-minute program called "The Bing Crosby Show".
