= The Bing Crosby Show (1954–1956) =

- Genre: Classic pop
- Running time: 15 minutes
- Country of origin: United States
- Language: English
- Home station: CBS
- Starring: Bing Crosby, Buddy Cole and his Trio
- Announcer: Ken Carpenter
- Written by: Bill Morrow
- Directed by: Murdo MacKenzie
- Produced by: Bill Morrow
- Recording studio: Hollywood, U.S.
- Original release: November 22, 1954 – December 31, 1956
- No. of series: 1
- No. of episodes: 551
- Opening theme: "Moonlight Becomes You" "Something in Common"
- Sponsored by: Various

The Bing Crosby Show was broadcast daily Mondays to Fridays and was of 15 minutes duration with Bing Crosby talking about all manner of different subjects and usually including three songs around the dialogue.

== Overview ==
During the summer of 1954 with radio audiences everywhere declining dramatically, Crosby decided not to continue with a major weekly radio show involving the expense of guest stars and a 22-piece orchestra. However, he was persuaded to continue in radio, albeit in a different and cheaper format.

On November 22, 1954 The Bing Crosby Show emerged on CBS at 9:15 p.m. preceding Amos 'n' Andy. For the 15-minute show, Bill Morrow provided a script of sorts, Ken Carpenter was the announcer and Murdo MacKenzie edited it all together using songs that the singer had pre-recorded at sessions with Buddy Cole and his trio (Buddy on piano and electric organ, Perry Botkin [later replaced by Vince Terri] on guitar, banjo etc., Don Whittaker on bass, Nick Fatool on drums). Commercial recordings, and songs utilised in the earlier General Electric series, were employed too as were guest appearances of his sons, primarily Lindsay.

Variety reviewed the opening show, saying inter alia, "…So now, Bing Crosby is on a CBS radio, across the board quarter, in the fractional 9.15 pm time that listeners are bound to find. He’s now the elder statesman singer, the doyen of his bracket and as great a radio personality, as ever…Bing is an exponent of the ‘sing’ but his talk is true, an incredible combination that he's made all his own, over the years, whether on an hour's kick or on tit-bits of this or that."

However, Broadcasting magazine was not happy with the 'talk' aspect of the show. "...But the chatter part of the program is a sad let-down. Instead of the carefree, casual banter which Bing and Ken used to exchange so amusingly, the opening programs of this season's Crosby series found Bing stumbling through inept monologues... Finally, this Crosby series is being broadcast sustaining (and how could one better epitomize the plight of network radio than by the single sorry fact that the whole high-powered CBS sales staff was unable to find a sponsor for a man whose products are still top sellers in record shops and movie houses?)... Estimated production cost: $2,700 per 15-minute program."

The show ran until December 31, 1956 without a break. Sponsorship was intermittent with Lanolin Plus Liquid, New Coffee Flavour Instant Postum and Philip Morris advertising in some shows. Initially Crosby used "Moonlight Becomes You" as his theme tune before switching to "Something In Common". The audience rating was 3.1 for 1954-55 which earned the show fourteenth position in the Nielsen ratings. Jack Benny’s show was in top position with 5.8. In 1955-56, the audience rating was 2.2 which placed the show in tenth position in the Nielsen ratings of evening programs. Our Miss Brooks (starring Eve Arden) was in top position with 4.3.

Crosby's next regular radio series began on September 2, 1957 and was The Ford Road Show Featuring Bing Crosby.
