= Judd Conlon =

American vocal arranger and conductor

Justin "Judd" Conlon (born Justin Norbert Conlon; June 16, 1910 – July 28, 1966) was an American vocal arranger and conductor.

== Early life ==
Conlon was born in 1910 in Cuba City, Wisconsin. He relocated to Dubuque, Iowa, where he attended Columbia Academy and Columbia College. Conlon played the accordion and was active in musical groups including the Vested Choir directed by Father Alphonse Dress. This may have led to his mastery of vocal arranging. He played accordion at the Hilltop Casino until 4:00 a.m., slept, and then had to get up for his college classes. In high school he formed the Justin Conlon Orchestra. By the time he was in college, the group toured the Midwest and was often featured on Iowa radio stations WMT in Cedar Rapids, WHO in Des Moines, and WOC in Davenport.

Conlon's first major arranging work was with the Kay Kyser Orchestra.

== Career ==
In 1945, the Kay Kyser band was at its peak. One of its main attractions was The Campus Kids, which Conlon had joined as a vocalist that July. His debut recordings with the group were "Choo Choo Polka" and "That’s for Me". At that time, the other Kids were Diane Pendleton, Donna Wood, Loulie Jean Norman, and Charlie Parlato.

Conlon, trained on the accordion and as a vocal arranger and conductor, had an ambition to form his own vocal group. In The Campus Kids, he was exposed to two singers with a four-octave range and perfect pitch: Loulie Jean Norman and Gloria Wood. With them and his own basso profundo, plus Charlie Parlato as first tenor, Conlon had the makings of the new group he wanted. He assigned himself the baritone part, Norman was first or lead soprano, and Wood second soprano. He also recruited Mack McLean from the Six Hits and a Miss singing group as a second tenor.

== The Rhythmaires ==
The formation of Conlon's group was likely hastened by the sudden departure of The Charioteers as Bing Crosby's vocalists on his weekly radio program toward the end of the first Philco season in March, 1947. Several of the first season's final shows featured an unknown chorus that may have been the singers in the still unnamed group. Jud Conlon's Rhythmaires was christened and ready to go as recordings for the second Philco season commenced in August 1947. Conlon, Parlato, McLean and Norman bade farewell to The Campus Kids in December. (Gloria Wood remained with Kyser into 1948.)

The Rhythmaires had launched an association with Crosby that would continue for almost a decade in more than 230 broadcasts and over 40 recordings. The group even helped to sell Minute Maid. The Rhythmaires' first commercial recording with Crosby took place on December 3, 1947, when "Ballerina" was laid down. Other notable recordings were "Home Cookin", "Bibbidi-Bobbidi-Boo", "Teddy Bears' Picnic", "It’s Beginning to Look Like Christmas", "Zing a Little Zong", and "Road to Bali".

Sometimes the Rhythmaires would be expanded into either The Jud Conlon Singers (e.g. "Stay Well", "Sorry") or The Jud Conlon Choir (e.g. "The Loneliness of Evening", "More I Cannot Wish You", "We Meet Again"). The Rhythmaires' final recordings with Crosby were made in April 1956, for the Decca LP Songs I Wish I Had Sung. The Rhythmaires also furnished background vocals for Crosby in Walt Disney’s The Legend of Sleepy Hollow (from The Adventures of Ichabod and Mr. Toad), released in 1949.

After the conclusion of Philco Radio Time in 1949, the Rhythmaires continued with Crosby throughout his weekly Chesterfield radio series that ran until 1952. Each week the group sang the cigarette’s "Sound Off" jingle.

In 1957, the Rhythmaires appeared on jazz ensemble leader Russell Garcia's The Johnny Evergreens (ABC-Paramount, 1956). tenor saxophone player Georgie Auld's That's Auld (Brunswick, 1957). The next year they appeared on Auld's album "Jazz Goes Latin" for Capitol Records.

For the first two seasons of The Many Loves of Dobie Gillis (CBS-TV, 1959-1963) the Rhythmaires performed the opening and closing theme song, "Dobie", written by Lionel Newman and Max Shulman.

== Other work ==
In the early 1950s, Bing Crosby engaged Conlon to give voice lessons to his four sons.

Crosby had used Conlon to make arrangements and vocal backgrounds for his radio series, and Conlon went on to work for Andy Williams and Guy Lombardo. In the mid-1950s, he began collaborating with satirist Stan Freberg. His arrangements appeared on nearly all Freberg's comedy records, as well as on his Stan Freberg Radio Show. He also worked on the television program Frankie Laine Time.

Conlon served as a musical arranger for Walt Disney. Among his credits are the Disney movies Alice in Wonderland (1951), Peter Pan (1953), and Babes in Toyland (1961). His choir was left uncredited for the 1950 version of Cinderella.

== Personal life ==
Conlon married Charlotte Manley in Chicago on 3 October 1933. They had one son, Michael. Conlon died on July 28, 1966, in Chicago at the age of 56. He was found dead in his Chicago hotel room of an apparent heart attack. He had been there as a delegate to the convention of American Federation of Television and Radio Artists. A requiem Mass was held a few days later at St. Victor's Roman Catholic Church in West Hollywood.

== Discography ==
The Jud Conlon Singers, arranger and director: Singles: 78 and 45 recordings in 1949 to 1959 with Bing Crosby, Peggy Lee, Jo Stafford, Paul Weston, Margaret Whiting and others.

The Rhythmaires, arranger and director: Albums:

- With Georgie Auld
  - Manhattan (Coral, 1953)
  - Lullaby of Broadway (Coral, 1956)
  - Sax Gone Latin (Capitol, 1958)
- With Stan Freberg
  - The Best Of The Stan Freberg Shows Vol. 2 (Capitol, 1958)
  - The Madison Ave. Werewolf (Capitol, 1963)
- With Russell Garcia
  - The Johnny Evergreens (ABC-Paramount, 1956)
- With Mary Kaye Trio
  - A Night In Las Vegas With The Mary Kaye Trio (Brunswick, 1956)

Singles: 78 and 45 recordings in 1949 to 1959 with Georgie Auld, Bing Crosby, Evelyn Knight, Peggy Lee, Donald O'Connor and others.

=== As arranger ===
For Kay Kyser:

45 singles for Kay Kyser and his orchestra from 1946 to 1949.

For George Shearing:

  - Night Mist (Capitol LP, 1958)

For Mel Torme:

  - Sings His Own California Suite (Capitol, 1950)

== Filmography ==
=== Music department ===
- The Judy Garland Show (1963–64) (CBS TV) (Choral Arrangements) Credited as The Jud Conlon Singers.
- Babes in Toyland (1961)
- Bobby Darin and Friends (1961) (TV) (music arranger: vocal arrangements)
- Screen Directors Playhouse (music arranger: vocal arrangements) (1 episode, 1956)
- Prima Donna (1956) TV episode (music arranger: vocal arrangements)
- Peter Pan (1953) (vocal arranger) "You Can Fly! You Can Fly! You Can Fly!" (04:03)
- Alice in Wonderland (1951) (music arranger: vocal arrangements)

=== Soundtrack ===
- It's Always Fair Weather (1955) ("March, March" (uncredited), "The Time for Parting" (uncredited),
- "Once Upon a Time" (1944) (uncredited), "Why Are We Here?" (uncredited)
- Here Comes Elmer (1943) (writer: "Hitch Old Dobbin to the Shay Again")

=== Self ===
- Cha-Cha-Cha Boom! (1956) (as The Judd Conlon Group) .... Himself
- The Scene Of the Crime (1956) (as the Jud Conlon Singers with Bob Thompson's Orch.)

=== Live Duets ===
- "If You Stub Your Toe on the Moon" (1947-1949) Bing Crosby with Judd Conlon's Rhythmaires
- "The Court Jester" (21 – 22 September 1955, Los Angeles) Sylvia Fine – Sammy Cahn With the Judd Conlon Singers
