= The Bing Crosby – Chesterfield Show =

The Bing Crosby Show for Chesterfield
- Genre: Musical variety
- Running time: 30 minutes
- Country of origin: United States
- Language(s): English
- Syndicates: CBS
- Starring: Bing Crosby; The John Scott Trotter Orchestra; Jud Conlon's Rhythmaires
- Announcer: Ken Carpenter
- Written by: Charles Tazewell; Bill Morrow; Hal Kanter
- Directed by: Murdo MacKenzie
- Produced by: Bill Morrow
- Recording studio: Hollywood, U.S.
- Other studios: San Francisco, California; New York
- Original release: September 21, 1949 – June 25, 1952
- No. of series: 3
- No. of episodes: 113
- Opening theme: Where the Blue of the Night (Meets the Gold of the Day)
- Sponsored by: Chesterfield cigarettes

The Bing Crosby Show for Chesterfield was a 30-minute musical variety old-time radio program starring entertainer Bing Crosby. The series ran on CBS Radio from 1949–1952.

The series was sponsored by Chesterfield cigarettes and was usually recorded in Hollywood or San Francisco.

Notable guest stars and appearances on the series included Peggy Lee, Ella Fitzgerald, Al Jolson, Bob Hope, Mary Martin, The Andrews Sisters, The Bell Sisters and The John Scott Trotter Orchestra.

== Show origins ==
Singer and entertainer Bing Crosby had finished a three-year engagement with Philco and ABC on Philco Radio Time which had ended in June 1949. Crosby then returned to CBS where Chesterfield cigarettes picked up the sponsorship tab for his show. The show was named The Bing Crosby Show for Chesterfield and premiered on September 21, 1949.

== Overview ==
Following his three-year stint with Philco which had concluded in the previous June, Bing Crosby's first programme with his new sponsors was broadcast on the 21st September 1949. The decade which was drawing to a close had consolidated Crosby's position as the world's most popular singer and in comparison to periods of a similar duration, was his most productive in terms of feature films, records, radio time and personal appearances. Only in retrospect can the massive transformation that overtook the entertainment business, in the Fifties, be appreciated. The ailing cinema still believed it could find its salvation in gimmicks and dabbled with wide screens, stereophonic sound and 3D. In 1954, the advent of rock and roll was to provide the most astonishing and far-reaching changes that had ever taken place in the field of popular music. Radio was running out of sponsors and the “smart” money was backing television. The public infatuation with the medium became absolute and advertisers were swift to recognise the obvious advantage to be gained from visual presentation of their products. Liggett & Myers, manufacturers of Chesterfield cigarettes, were no exception, keeping a foot firmly placed in both camps. In addition to Bing Crosby, they had also acquired the services of Perry Como and Arthur Godfrey and were later to add, if only briefly, Bob Hope and Martin & Lewis.

=== Season one ===
With Chesterfield cigarettes on board as Crosby's new sponsor after his stint with Philco on ABC Radio's Philco Radio Time, Bing returned to his original home on radio, CBS. The network premiered The Bing Crosby Show for Chesterfield on Wednesday September 21, 1949 at 9:30 pm (Eastern) which was the time slot that series would remain in for its entire three-year run.

Billboard liked the opening show. "Bing’s back and all’s right with the airwaves. Sparked by the crooner’s mellow mike manners and a showmanly assist from guest stars Peggy Lee and Abe Burrows, the preem show sailed along effortlessly in the warm, relaxed groove so characteristic of the groaner."

During the season the audience share was 18.0 which put the singer in ninth place overall for evening programmes. The top position was held by the Jack Benny show with a rating of 25.3. The ratings were now being collected by the AC Nielsen company which used the audiometer, a mechanical black box inserted into a radio set to record stations being listened. In March 1950, a survey came out with "the greatest radio personalities during the last 25 years". The survey named Crosby the number 2 personality behind Jack Benny. Entertainer Bob Hope and comedic duo Amos 'n' Andy were tied for the number 3 spot.

=== Season two ===
This season of the program was known for its list of guest stars, including Bob Hope, Dorothy Kirsten, Burl Ives, Dick Powell, Ella Fitzgerald, Hopalong Cassidy, Louis Armstrong, Fred Astaire, The Andrews Sisters, Dinah Shore and Nat King Cole. The December 20, 1950 broadcast of the program featured Crosby's then wife Dixie Lee and their four boys Gary, Dennis, Phillip and Lindsay.

Variety summed up the opening show on October 11, 1950 saying, "If Crosby can keep banging it in, in the weeks to come as he did on the tee-off, it’s going to take some doing by the others to keep him out of the first ten." However the audience share for the season was only 10.0 and the show did not figure in the top 20 ratings as assessed by Nielsen. The top radio show for the season was the Lux Radio Theatre with a rating of only 21.0 reflecting the increasing impact of television.

The second season of the program was also noted for resurrecting the career of actress Judy Garland. Judy's drug addiction and unreliability had led Metro-Goldwyn-Mayer to release her from her contract there in September 1950. Depressed and broke, and having recently attempted suicide, Judy was invited to become a semi-regular on the program, appearing eight times during the season, until she secured a concert engagement at the London Palladium in April 1951.

==== "Bing's Month" ====
CBS and Paramount Pictures declared the month of January 1951 "Bing's Month" in honor of Crosby's 20th year as a solo artist in show business. Art Linkletter hosted a half-hour tribute to Crosby over CBS radio on January 9. On January 7, the Liberty Broadcasting System from its Los Angeles affiliate KMPC broadcast an hour-long tribute to Crosby hosted by Ross Mulholland and featuring interviews with Paul Whiteman, Tommy Dorsey, Russ Morgan, Jane Wyman, The Andrews Sisters, Johnny Burke, Jerry Lewis, Victor Young, Frank Capra and others.

=== Season three ===
The opening show was on October 3, 1951 and Variety welcomed it with "Bing Crosby is probably one of the most affable performers in radio. Year in and year out, he’s held a commanding position on the air by virtue of warm, easy verbiage and a song style that’s made him the number one pop-singer. His return to the airways after a summer hiatus indicates that Crosby will maintain his audiences." Unfortunately, Variety was wrong and this season of the program would prove to be the last as Chesterfield decided to drop the show. Radio audiences were falling because of the impact of television and Chesterfield cigarettes decided to use their advertising budget on the new medium. The show did not reach the top 20 Nielsen ratings and the most highly rated radio show for the season was the Amos ‘n’ Andy program with 17.0.

The series ended on June 25, 1952. Sponsorship for Crosby moved from Chesterfield to General Electric and in the fall of 1952, The Bing Crosby Show for General Electric premiered.
