= Robert Mitchell (organist) =

American organist (1912–2009)

Background information
- Also known as: Bob Mitchell
- Born: Robert Mitchell; October 12, 1912; Sierra Madre, California, United States
- Died: July 4, 2009 (aged 96) Los Angeles, California, United States
- Genres: Silent Film Accompaniment
- Occupations: Choral director, Silent film Accompanist, Organist
- Instruments: Vocals; Piano; Organ
- Years active: 1924–2009

Robert Mitchell (October 12, 1912 – July 4, 2009) was an American organist and choir director whose career spanned 85 years, from 1924 to 2009. He was one of the last original silent film accompanists, having accompanied films from 1924 to 1928. Mitchell revived the art from 1992 until his death in 2009, usually to wild acclaim. During the 1930s, he organized the Robert Mitchell Boys Choir, who were cast in many films from the 1930s to the 1960s.

== Early life and career ==
Mitchell's Victorian-era mother found the new art form of silent film "cheap and vulgar". However, as an avid music lover, she allowed him to take music lessons with the reasoning he could accompany church services. At the age of 12 he was allowed to take a stint at The Strand Theatre in Pasadena, California, to play Christmas carols between showings of films. However, he did not stop playing once the film started, and his career as an accompanist began. He played for four years until the arrival of talkies made accompanists irrelevant.

At age 18 in 1930, Mitchell became the youngest person to become a Fellow of the American Guild of Organists (AGO), the highest level of professional certification awarded by the organization. In 1932 Mitchell won a scholarship to the Eastman School of Music, where he studied piano. He stayed in New York City performing gigs that varied from church accompaniment to speakeasies and radio.

== Robert Mitchell Boys Choir ==
Returning to Los Angeles, he started the Mitchell Singing Boys (also known as the St. Brendan's Church Boys Choir, Bob Mitchell's Singing Boys or simply Mitchell Boyschoir, from 1934 to 2000). The choir performed in over 100 films, including 1944's Best Picture winner Going My Way with Bing Crosby, Carefree with Fred Astaire, Angels with Dirty Faces with Pat O'Brien, and The Bishop's Wife with Cary Grant. Noted film composer Dimitri Tiomkin said of them, "Bob Mitchell’s boys represent the unusual combination of musicianship, artistry and versatility. Bob Mitchell’s genius is ever present. It was a great pleasure to have them sing and appear in The Great Waltz." Tony Butala, the founder of The Lettermen, was Mitchell's most notable student.

Mitchell and the choir were featured in a special short documentary film, Forty Boys and a Song (1941), which described the choir and showed the students rehearsing at their school desks as Mitchell provided instruction. The film was nominated for an Academy Award (for Best Short Subject, One-reel).

In December 1949 Mitchell was honored on the television series, This Is Your Life, for his work with the choir.

On Christmas Eve 1953, the choir appeared on Where's Raymond?, an American Broadcasting Company sitcom starring Ray Bolger. On Christmas night 1954, the choir appeared as the only guest on NBC's The Donald O'Connor Show and in December, 1971, they were reunited with Bing Crosby on the crooner's televised Christmas special, Bing Crosby and the Sounds of Christmas.

A directory of the film soundtracks that incorporated performances of the boys' choir lists 70 films from That Girl from Paris (1936) through All Night Long (1981). The Choir itself appears in at least six of these films.

== Other work ==
From 1962 to 1966 Mitchell played the organ for the Los Angeles Dodgers. Mitchell was musical director for several churches: St. Ann, St. Brendan, St. Kevin, and St. Peter in Los Angeles, and The Church of the Good Shepherd in Beverly Hills.

== Silent movie revival ==
From 1992 until his death in 2009 Mitchell regularly accompanied silent films in revival houses, particularly in California. He performed at The Orpheum and played a weekly stint at The Silent Movie Theatre, playing some of the original scores he had in the 1920s. True to his art Mitchell noted, "I never play anything that wasn't published before the picture was made," he says, "but I don't know how many people would actually know that." Mitchell's accompaniments were well known, and he received wild acclaim for his performances.

Mitchell performed until May 2009. After a bout with pneumonia his health began to decline. Mitchell hated missing a performance and according to a friend he tried to check himself out of the hospital weeks before his death so he could perform. The Silent Movie Theatre noted, "You don't really replace somebody like Bob Mitchell." Surrounded by a few close friends and listening to a recording of one of his performances, Mitchell died on July 4, 2009, at the age of 96. His funeral was held at Christ the King Roman Catholic Church in Los Angeles on July 10, 2009. He is buried at Hollywood Forever Cemetery.

== Awards ==
Mitchell received many awards during his lifetime. He received the Silver Medal awarded at the Royal Palace in Monte Carlo by Prince Rainier III and Princess Grace of Monaco. He also received a Silver Beaver Award, the highest honor awarded volunteers by local councils of the Boy Scouts of America. The American Melkite Archimandrite acclaimed Mitchell as a "Knight of Malta" with a medal. He also received an Honorary Plaque in the Amphitheater of Temple Ahavat Shalom, Northridge, California, as well as the "Pro Papa et Ecclesia" Certificate from Pope John Paul II.
