= Philco Radio Time =

1940s radio series

- Other names: The Bing Crosby Show; The Bing Crosby Program
- Genre: Musical variety
- Running time: 30 minutes
- Country of origin: United States
- Language: English
- Syndicates: ABC; Armed Forces Radio Network
- Starring: Bing Crosby; Peggy Lee; The John Scott Trotter Orchestra
- Announcer: Ken Carpenter; Bob Murphy; Glenn Riggs; Kenny Delmar
- Written by: Charles Tazewell; Bill Morrow; Larry Clemmons; Al Lewis
- Directed by: Murdo MacKenzie
- Produced by: Bill Morrow
- Recording studio: Hollywood, USA
- Original release: October 16, 1946 – June 1, 1949
- No. of series: 3
- No. of episodes: 108
- Opening theme: Where the Blue of the Night (Meets the Gold of the Day)
- Sponsored by: Philco see below

Philco Radio Time was an old-time radio radio series starring entertainer Bing Crosby. The series ran over ABC Radio with episodes airing from October 16, 1946–June 1, 1949. The series also was syndicated for a period of time over the Armed Forces Radio Network.

The series is also known for being the first pre-recorded radio program aired on the major USA radio networks. For the first season, the shows were recorded on disc, but beginning with the series' second season, the show began using Ampex tape recorders for their broadcasts.

The program was usually recorded in Hollywood and was sponsored by the Philco Corporation.

== Show origins ==
Starting in 1931, singer and entertainer Bing Crosby had had many appearances on radio as a solo performer before Philco Radio Time. In January 1936, Crosby moved from CBS Radio to NBC working as the master of ceremonies for the Kraft Music Hall. In June 1945, with the ensuing accompaniment of much legal wrangling, Bing Crosby terminated his nearly ten-year association with the Kraft Foods Company, leaving himself free to choose another sponsor. He declined other offers in favor of a deal with the Philco Corporation of America which, apart from the financial considerations involved, afforded the appealing convenience of pre-recording his broadcasts. He was obliged to honor an agreement with Kraft which required him to appear in thirteen more shows, the last of which was broadcast in May 1946. On Wednesday October 16th, 1946, ‘'Philco Radio Time' - The Bing Crosby Show’, opened on the ABC network and (according to the publicity of the time), Wednesday, became ‘Bing’s Day’.

== Seasons One through Three (1946–1949) ==
=== Season one ===
Philco Radio Time premiered on Wednesday October 16, 1946, on the newly formed American Broadcasting Company. Bob Hope was the program's first guest.

The program had an audience rating of 16.1 during the season which made it one of the network's top shows but left it outside the top twenty. Fibber McGee and Molly again topped the Hooper ratings with 30.2 but they had to share the position with The Pepsodent Show starring Bob Hope.

The series faced immediate problems during its first season having to do with its recording process. The first season of Philco Radio Time was recorded onto 16-inch diameter lacquer-coated aluminum disks. This made editing the show difficult, but not impossible. The actual broadcast was an edited version of the live performance shipped to radio stations on two discs with detailed instructions on when and how to play them. However, as the season progressed the editing of the recorded show on the disks caused loss of quality, and unfortunately many people complained that the sound quality was inferior to a live broadcast.

Sound engineer Mary Howard suggested that part of the problem was the local radio stations:

Most stations play a hundred records a day, and they play every last one wrong. Take the new Crosby show. Everybody complains that Bing has lost his voice, that the recording is tinny and distorted. That's nonsense. Bing sings about as well as he ever did, and the recording is all right. It's the stations that play it wrong. The grooves in a record are cut at varying angles and depths with styli of varying sizes. Records have to be played back with corresponding needles set for corresponding angles and sizes to fit the grooves. Until radio stations learn that, these big, nighttime transcribed shows are going to flop.
–TIME, Dec. 30, 1946

=== Season two ===
Crosby continued to pioneer in radio broadcasting during Philco's second season. However, the show had to address the poor audio quality of the recordings. During the summer before the show began, Jack Mullin was demonstrating his rebuilt Magnetophon recorders. The Crosby staff heard the quality of his recorders and the ease in which the tape could be edited. They asked him to give a demonstration to Bing Crosby in early August 1947, and Bing asked Jack Mullin to record the first show of the season on 10 August along with the usual transcription recording. The Magnetophon tape recording was far superior to the transcription disk and was used for the show broadcast on 1 October. However, the program was transferred to unedited transcription disks for the broadcast because of the concern of the tape breaking.

Beginning with the program's second-season premiere on October 1, 1947, Philco Radio Time pre-recorded all of their programs on to tape. Not only was the audio quality much improved, but tape was more easily edited than disks. Beginning with Season Three Ampex tape recorders based on the Magnetophon design were used with new tape provided by Minnesota Mining (3M). The audience share for the season was 16.8 which enabled the program to scrape into twentieth place in the Hooper ratings. The Fred Allen Show was in top place with 28.7 and the Kraft Music Hall (with Al Jolson as host) reached eleventh position with 21.4.

=== Season three ===
The third and last season of the program premiered on September 29, 1948. Several "firsts" were made during this season of the program. The first 33rpm long-playing record changer was introduced to the public through this program. Also the first ad for Philco television sets were also broadcast through this program. Finally, the Ampex tape recorders facilitated the first use of canned laughter in radio broadcasting, according to audio engineer John T. Mullin. On show number 93, broadcast February 16, 1949, comedian Bob Burns was getting excessive laughter from some improvised lines. The lines were cut for broadcast, but producer/writer Bill Morrow had Mullin save the laughs and insert them in a later program.

Philco Radio Time attained an audience share of 15.7 for the season. It reached nineteenth position in the Hooper ratings. The top evening program was the Lux Radio Theater with 28.6. The last episode of the program aired on June 1, 1949, and in September Crosby started on The Bing Crosby – Chesterfield Show.

== Sponsors ==
The series went through several different sponsors throughout its three-year run. Below is the list of all the sponsors of the radio program:

- Philco Radio and Television

- The Philco Dealers of Charleston, West Virginia (WKNA)
- The Philco Dealers of Corpus Christi, Texas (KSIX)
- The Philco Dealers of Long Beach, California (KGER, now KMRO)
- The Philco Dealers of Reno, Nevada (KWRN)

- Burgermeister Beer
- Rainier Brewing Company
- Krebs Furniture
- Scott Jewelry Company of Lowell, Massachusetts (WLAW)
- Armstrong's Supply Company of Lubbock, Texas (KFYO)
- Beckley Music & Electric Co. of Beckley, West Virginia (WJLS)
- Cater Furniture of Anniston, Alabama (WHMA)
- City Furniture Mart of Marion, Ohio (WMRN)
- Dixie Appliance Company of Bluefield, West Virginia (WHIS)
- Federal Distributing Company of Wichita, Kansas (KWBW)
- Grabe Electrical Company of Tucson, Arizona (KTUC—Thursdays at 8:30 pm)
- Hopkins Brothers' Furniture of Kokomo, Indiana (WKMO)
- Hubbard Furniture of Blytheville, Arkansas
- Imperial Furniture Company of El Paso, Texas (KTSM—Thursdays at 9:30 pm)
- J.C. Johnsen and Son Furniture of Las Vegas, New Mexico (KFUN)
- Junkin's Furniture of Harlingen, Texas
- Modern Furniture Company of Laredo, Texas
- Piedmont Hardware Company in Danville, Virginia (WBTM)
- Radio & Motor Service, Inc. in Altoona, Pennsylvania (WRTA)
- Samuel Levi and Company in Portsmouth, Ohio (WPAY)
- Standard Hardware Company of Gastonia, North Carolina (WGNC)
- Ward's Incorporated of Billings, Montana (KBMY)

== Ratings ==
Season	Rank on ABC	Rating	References
1946-1947	12	16.1	
1947-1948	10	16.8	
1948-1949	13	15.7	
