= William Morrow (screenwriter) =

American screenwriter (1907–1971)

- Born: August 16, 1907; Sandwich, Illinois, United States
- Died: February 5, 1971 (aged 63); Los Angeles, California, United States
- Occupations: Screenwriter and producer

William S. Morrow (August 16, 1907 – February 5, 1971) was a comedic screenwriter and producer who wrote scripts for radio, films and television.

== Career ==
He launched his writing career with Jack Benny in 1938 and for 25 years was Bing Crosby's top writer.

He arrived in Los Angeles with Ed Beloin from Chicago to work on Jack Benny's writing staff, and he remained with the comedian until entering the Armed Forces in 1942. During his time with Jack Benny, he wrote for two of Benny's films, Love Thy Neighbor (1940) and Buck Benny Rides Again (1940), as well as for the star vehicle Tales of Manhattan (1942).

Released from the Armed Forces in 1945, he joined Bing Crosby and not only worked on his radio shows but on his films and television shows as well. His first assignment with Crosby was as co-producer and writer for Philco Radio Time and he continued in this role through the crooner's subsequent radio series: The Bing Crosby – Chesterfield Show (1949–1952); The Bing Crosby Show for General Electric (1952–1954); The Bing Crosby Show (1954-1956); A Christmas Sing with Bing (1955–1962); The Ford Road Show Featuring Bing Crosby (1957–1958) and The Bing Crosby – Rosemary Clooney Show (1960–1962).

He scripted the Hope / Crosby film Road to Bali and also wrote for The Colgate Comedy Hour and The Frank Sinatra Show (1957–1958). He wrote Crosby's first TV show and many of his specials including the prestigious Edsel Show.

He also was associated with late producer Robert Welch at Paramount Pictures.

At the time of the 1950 U.S. Census, Morrow lived in the same Los Angeles apartment building as future U.S. president Ronald Reagan at 1326 Londonderry View Dr.

Bill Morrow married Mary Henderson on December 17, 1955, at Bing Crosby's Thunderbird home in Palm Springs. Crosby sang "I Love You Truly". The marriage ended in divorce.

Morrow died of cancer in Hollywood. He had undergone surgery for lung cancer fourteen months previously, but the malady was never cured.
