= Toot, Whistle, Plunk and Boom =

1953 film by Ward Kimball and Charles August Nichols

Toot, Whistle, Plunk, and Boom
- Poster
- Directed by: Ward Kimball; Charles A. Nichols
- Story by: Dick Huemer
- Produced by: Walt Disney
- Starring: Bill Thompson; Thurl Ravenscroft; Loulie Jean Norman; Charlie Parlato; Gloria Wood
- Music by: Joseph Dubin; Sonny Burke (songs); Jack Elliot (songs)
- Animation by: Ward Kimball; Julius Svendsen; Marc Davis; Henry Tanous; Art Stevens; Xavier Atencio
- Color process: Technicolor
- Production company: Walt Disney Productions
- Distributed by: Buena Vista Distribution
- Release date: November 10, 1953
- Running time: 10 minutes (one reel)
- Country: United States
- Language: English

Toot, Whistle, Plunk and Boom is an American animated short film produced by Walt Disney Productions and directed by Ward Kimball and Charles A. Nichols. A sequel to the first Adventures in Music cartoon, the 3-D short Melody (released earlier in 1953), Toot, Whistle, Plunk and Boom is a stylized presentation of the evolution of the four orchestra sections: the brass ("toot"), the woodwind ("whistle"), the strings ("plunk"), and the percussion ("boom").

The first Disney cartoon to be filmed and released in widescreen CinemaScope, Toot, Whistle, Plunk and Boom won the 1954 Oscar for Best Short Subject (Cartoons). In 1994, it was voted #29 of the 50 Greatest Cartoons of all time by members of the animation field.

The short was originally released to theaters on November 10, 1953, and was the first release by Buena Vista Distribution, a distribution company established by Walt Disney. When Disney's regular distributor RKO Radio Pictures resisted Disney's idea of releasing a feature-length True-Life Adventures nature documentary film, Disney formed his own distribution company to handle future Disney releases.

== Plot ==
Professor Owl, who rushes to the schoolhouse full of his fine feathered students as a drum roll, is played on a snare.

A brief musical section introduces "the subject for today": the study of musical instruments. Professor Owl explains to the class (and the viewer) that all music originates from four core sounds: toot (brass), whistle (woodwind), plunk (strings) and boom (percussion).

=== Toot ===
The film jumps to a group of four cavemen, each of whom have discovered the nuclear form of one of the above sounds. A portly Caveman Toot discovered that blowing through an old cow's horn produces a pleasing "toot". The short advances to ancient Egypt in 2000 BC, where Caveman Toot discovers that metal horns produce even better sounds. He celebrates by breaking into a two-note jazz solo as Egyptian characters painted on the walls boogie down.

Professor Owl explains that making a trumpet longer made its tone lower. The scene switches to a Roman trumpeter who crashes into a column and bends his horn into a grotesque shape, but soon discovers that despite this change in form, the trumpet does not sound any different: it is possible to change the horn's shape without changing the pitch. However, as Professor Owl explains, this horn can only produce certain notes; in order to get all of the notes required for even a simple tune, they would need four horns of different lengths. If there is a horn with valves, then the valves control the passage of air, and this fact is celebrated with another solo.

=== Whistle ===
Caveman Whistle is trying to impress his "cave girl" by blowing through a tube of grass; he further discovers that adding holes to the tube allows him to modify the "whistle" in interesting ways—the more holes Whistle adds the longer the grass tube gets and he invents the first flute. The cave girl is impressed, but then a rival caveman appears, bonks the cave girl on the head with his club, and drags her off by the hair—which makes Caveman Whistle angry.

Professor Owl explains that this system of holes is the basis for every woodwind instrument, including the clarinet played by Johann Sebastian Bach and the saxophone played by a jazz musician.

=== Plunk ===
Caveman Plunk has discovered that plucking on the string of his bow produces a pleasant "plunk" sound. An off-screen choir explains–as the animation shows–how to create a simple harp from "taller" Caveman Plunk's bow by adding a jar to make a resonator, adding some extra strings, changing the jar to a box of wood, sliding it down and adding tuning pegs, and rearranging it all. Plunk invents the first harp.

Professor Owl mentions that the musician can either pluck the harp, which is played by a taller Caveman Plunk, or play it with a bow, which is played by a shorter Caveman Plunk. The short briefly visits several periods in history, where there are several stringed instruments being played in similar fashion, and finishes with a string quartet, and all of them ending with the strings being broken.

=== Boom ===
Caveman Boom hits his stomach to produce a "boom", and hits other things with his hand and his club to make other sounds. Professor Owl explains how a variety of percussion instruments emerged from this basic theory, ranging from rattles to complex drum kits and even the bass drums of marching bands.

=== Conclusion ===
The chorus recaps that all music, from the trombone to the calliope to the banjo to Latin percussion to "music oriental" to an orchestra in a concert hall, emerge from the four core sounds with Caveman Toot in the brass section, Caveman Whistle in the woodwind section, Caveman Plunk in the string section and Caveman Boom in the percussion section, all wearing top hats.

== Cast ==
- Bill Thompson as Professor Owl / Bertie Birdbrain (uncredited)
- Loulie Jean Norman as Penelope Pinfeather (uncredited)
- Charlie Parlato as Chorus Singer (uncredited)
- Gloria Wood as Suzy Sparrow (uncredited)
- The Mellomen as Singing Group (uncredited)

== Alternate versions ==
Like many of Disney's early CinemaScope films, a "flat" version shot in 4:3 ratio was made for theaters that were not equipped for CinemaScope. This required rearranging the artwork for some shots to accommodate the smaller screen.

=== Comparing CinemaScope and flat versions ===
Both CinemaScope and flat versions of Toot, Whistle, Plunk and Boom consider major changes for either television runs or theaters that were not equipped for CinemaScope:

- The most notable change comes at the transition from the end of the "Boom" section to the parade that starts the finale. In the CinemaScope version, the background and characters fade out, leaving the bass drum in the last scene alone; the bass drum then jumps from the side of the screen to the center, and the parade fades in. In the flat version, the camera zooms in on the bass drum, dissolving into the parade and zooms back out.
- Shots of multiple repeated characters (like the bird chorus at the end, for instance) were cut in half, using two repetitions instead of four.
- Some of the characters like the kitchen bird band members near the beginning and the string quartet members get closer together in the flat version. They were separate far enough in the CinemaScope version.
- In the flat version, Bach with his clarinet has a book of sheet music with "BACH" written on it instead of the busts around him in the CinemaScope version.
- In the flat version, Plunk morphs into the Egyptian playing the harp instead of fading out to him in the CinemaScope version.
- In the CinemaScope version, the grand piano also in the plunk segment stretches but in the flat version, it stays a certain size.
- In the CinemaScope version, the Caveman Whistle gag considers only one scene including a zoom-in. In the flat version, it was edited into multiple scenes. Some of these changes include zoomed in shots of the impressions. The only major change in the Caveman Whistle gag is the screen panning to the right to reveal the rival caveman hitting the cave girl with his stick.
- In the CinemaScope version, the shorter Caveman Plunk can be seen in the far top left during the creation of the harp. He doesn't appear until afterwards in the flat version.

== Theatrical release and other releases ==
The world premiere of Toot, Whistle, Plunk and Boom was first shown at two theaters, the Fulton Theatre (now Byham Theater) in Pittsburgh, Pennsylvania and the Globe Theatre (now Lunt-Fontanne Theatre) in New York City on release day.

It was also released with How to Marry a Millionaire in 12 major cities.

On March 27, 1959, American Broadcasting Company's Friday evening program Walt Disney Presents telecast its first television showing of Toot, Whistle, Plunk and Boom.

Toot, Whistle, Plunk and Boom was reissued in 1963 as a companion short to that year's theatrical re-release of Fantasia.

In 1962, Disney issued a re-recorded and expanded version of the short's music and voices on vinyl LP entitled A Child's Introduction to Melody and the Instruments of the Orchestra. Thurl Ravenscroft provided the voice of the owl on the album.

While the film was originally released into theaters as a part of a broader collection of shorts, it continues to be used today in music classrooms to provide an elementary understanding of how musical instruments work.

== Home media ==
The short was released on December 6, 2005, on Walt Disney Treasures: Disney Rarities – Celebrated Shorts: 1920s–1960s.

Additional releases include:

- Walt Disney Cartoon Classics: Limited Gold Edition – Disney's Best: The Fabulous '50s (VHS)
- Fantasia 2000 (DVD)

== Reception ==
Toot, Whistle, Plunk and Boom won the 1954 Oscar for Best Short Subject (Cartoons). The British Film Institute's magazine Sight & Sound offered it a negative review. Writer Roy Edwards summarized: "Despite its incredible borrowings from UPA, the new Disney cartoon ... confirms, if confirmation were needed, his imaginative abdication as a cartoonist."

== See also ==
- Musical instrument classification
