= Ken Carpenter (announcer) =

American radio and TV announcer, sportscaster (1900–1984)

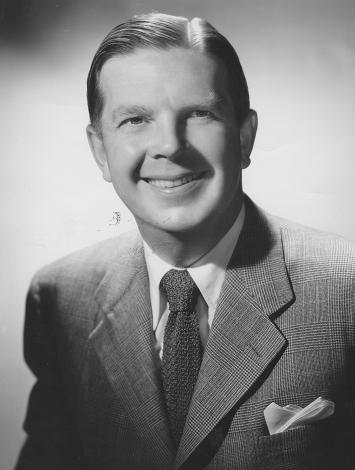
- Born: Kenneth Lee Carpenter; August 21, 1900; Avon, Illinois, U.S.
- Died: October 16, 1984 (aged 84); Saint John's Health Center, Santa Monica, California, U.S.
- Education: Lombard College
- Occupations: TV and radio announcer, sportscaster
- Spouse: Betty Carpenter (m. 1922)
- Children: 1

Kenneth Lee Carpenter (August 21, 1900 – October 16, 1984) was a TV and radio announcer and sportscaster, who was the announcer for singer and actor Bing Crosby for 27 years.

== Early life and education ==
Born in Avon, Illinois, Carpenter was the son of Barlow Carpenter, a Universalist minister, and Clara Carpenter. He graduated from Lombard College in Galesburg, Illinois in 1921, where he was a member of the Phi Delta Theta fraternity. Lombard College also is where Carpenter met his future lifelong wife, Betty. They were married July 29, 1922.

== Early show business career ==
Carpenter moved to Hollywood in 1929, one year after resolving to move there after listening to radio legend Graham McNamee call the Rose Bowl. The 1930 Census reveals he was employed as a newspaper copywriter. Not long afterward, he became a staff announcer for KFI radio. As part of that job, Carpenter announced USC and UCLA football games for the Pacific Coast and the NBC radio networks from 1932 until 1935. In 1935, Carpenter announced the Rose Bowl for NBC radio. Carpenter became the color man for Bill Stern for all NBC-originated radio programming from Los Angeles from 1938 until 1942, which included the Rose Bowl. "Those Rose Bowl games were a big break for me, as they made me known to clients and advertising agencies in the East, so I had a jump on other local men when the big commercial shows started originating in L.A. in the mid-1930s," Carpenter later said.

== Work with Bing Crosby ==
In 1936, Carpenter became Crosby's announcer after Crosby began hosting the Kraft Music Hall radio variety program. Carpenter continued to announce for Crosby on various programs for the next 27 years. Crosby famously once called Carpenter "the man with the golden voice." Carpenter also was known for ringing the chimes on many of Crosby's shows.

== Other work ==
Carpenter announced for Al Jolson and Edgar Bergen as well. By virtue of his extensive announcing career, he wound up with uncredited roles in well-known movies, including Mr. Smith Goes to Washington and Susan Slept Here. He was also the narrator for producer Jerry Fairbanks' theatrical short-subject series Unusual Occupations and Speaking of Animals, both released by Paramount Pictures.

From 1949 until 1952, Carpenter was the announcer for the NBC Radio sitcom The Halls of Ivy. He was also the announcer for Lux Radio Theater from 1952 through the end of the series in 1955; from 1955 until 1957, Carpenter hosted NBC's Lux Video Theatre program during its summer seasons. Other programs for which Carpenter was an announcer on radio included The Great Gildersleeve, The Chase and Sanborn Program (featuring Edgar Bergen and Charlie McCarthy) and a stint on The Life of Riley from 1947 through 1949.

== Retirement ==
In his final years, Carpenter lived in the Brentwood area of Los Angeles. He died at Saint John's Health Center in Santa Monica, California on October 16, 1984 after suffering a brief illness. Carpenter was survived by his wife Betty and his son, Ronald. He also was survived by four grandchildren and five great-grandchildren.
