= Crosby =

Crosby may refer to:

== Places ==
=== Canada ===
- Crosby, Ontario, part of the township of Rideau Lakes, Ontario
- Crosby, Ontario, a neighbourhood in the city of Markham, Ontario

=== England ===
- Crosby, Cumbria
- Crosby, Lincolnshire
- Crosby, Merseyside
  - Crosby (UK Parliament constituency)
- Crosby, North Yorkshire
- Crosby Beach, Merseyside
- Crosby Garrett, Cumbria
- Crosby-on-Eden, Cumbria
- Great Crosby, Merseyside
- Little Crosby, Merseyside

=== Isle of Man ===
- Crosby, Isle of Man

=== United States ===
- Crosby, Alabama
- Crosby, Minnesota
- Crosby, Mississippi
- Crosby, North Dakota
- Crosby Township, Ohio
- Crosby, Pennsylvania
- Crosby, Texas
- Crosby County, Texas
- Crosby, Washington

=== South Africa ===
- Crosby, Gauteng

== Other uses ==
- Crosby (surname)
  - Bing Crosby (1903–1977), American singer and actor
  - David Crosby (1941–2023), American singer-songwriter
  - Sidney Crosby (born 1987), Canadian ice hockey player
- USS Crosby (DD-164), a Wickes class destroyer
- Crosby, a fictional location in The Railway Series
- Crosby (peach), a peach cultivar

== See also ==
- Crosbie (disambiguation)
- Crossby
