= Crosbie =

Crosbie is a name. Notable people with the name include:

== Given name ==
- Crosbie E. Saint, an American military officer

== Surname ==
- Annette Crosbie, Scottish television actress
- Ches Crosbie, Newfoundland lawyer and politician
- Chesley Crosbie, Newfoundland businessman, and politician
- David Crosbie (disambiguation)
- Debbie Crosbie (born 1969/1970), British banker
- Sir Edward Crosbie, United Irishman
- Gerard Crosbie (Gerry Cinnamon), Scottish singer-songwriter
- Hannah Crosbie (born 1997), Scottish wine critic
- Harry Crosbie, Irish property developer
- James Crosbie (senator), Irish barrister, journalist, and Fine Gael politician, senator (1938–51, 1954–57)
- James Crosbie (Kerry politician) (c. 1760 – 1836), MP for County Kerry (1798–1806, 1812–1826)
- John Crosbie (1931–2020), Canadian politician
- John Chalker Crosbie, Newfoundland businessman, and politician
- Johnny Crosbie, Scottish footballer
- Juliette Crosbie, Irish singer and actress
- KC Crosbie, Republican National Committee co-chair
- Luke Crosbie, Scottish international rugby union player
- Lynn Crosbie, Canadian poet and novelist
- Richard Crosbie, Irish balloonist
- Robert Crosbie, Canadian theosophist
- Thomas Crosbie Holdings, Irish media, and publishing group
- Tim Crosbie, visual effects supervisor
- Virginia Crosbie, British Member of Parliament elected in 2019
- Viscount Crosbie, Irish peerage
- William Crosbie (disambiguation)

== See also ==
- Gerry Cinnamon (born Gerald Crosbie, 1985) is a Scottish musician
- Crosbie baronets
- Crosby (disambiguation)
