= James Crosbie =

James Crosbie may refer to:

- James Crosbie (senator), Irish barrister, journalist and Fine Gael politician, senator 1938–51 and 1954–57
- James Crosbie (Kerry politician) (c1760–1836), MP for County Kerry 1798–1806, 1812–26
- James Dayrolles Crosbie, Irish justice of the peace and British Army general
- Joseph Hardcastle Corsbie (1913–1992), Canadian politician

== See also ==
- Crosbie (disambiguation)
