= Ballyheigue Castle =

Ruined building in County Kerry, Ireland

Coordinates: 52°23′32″N 9°50′20″W

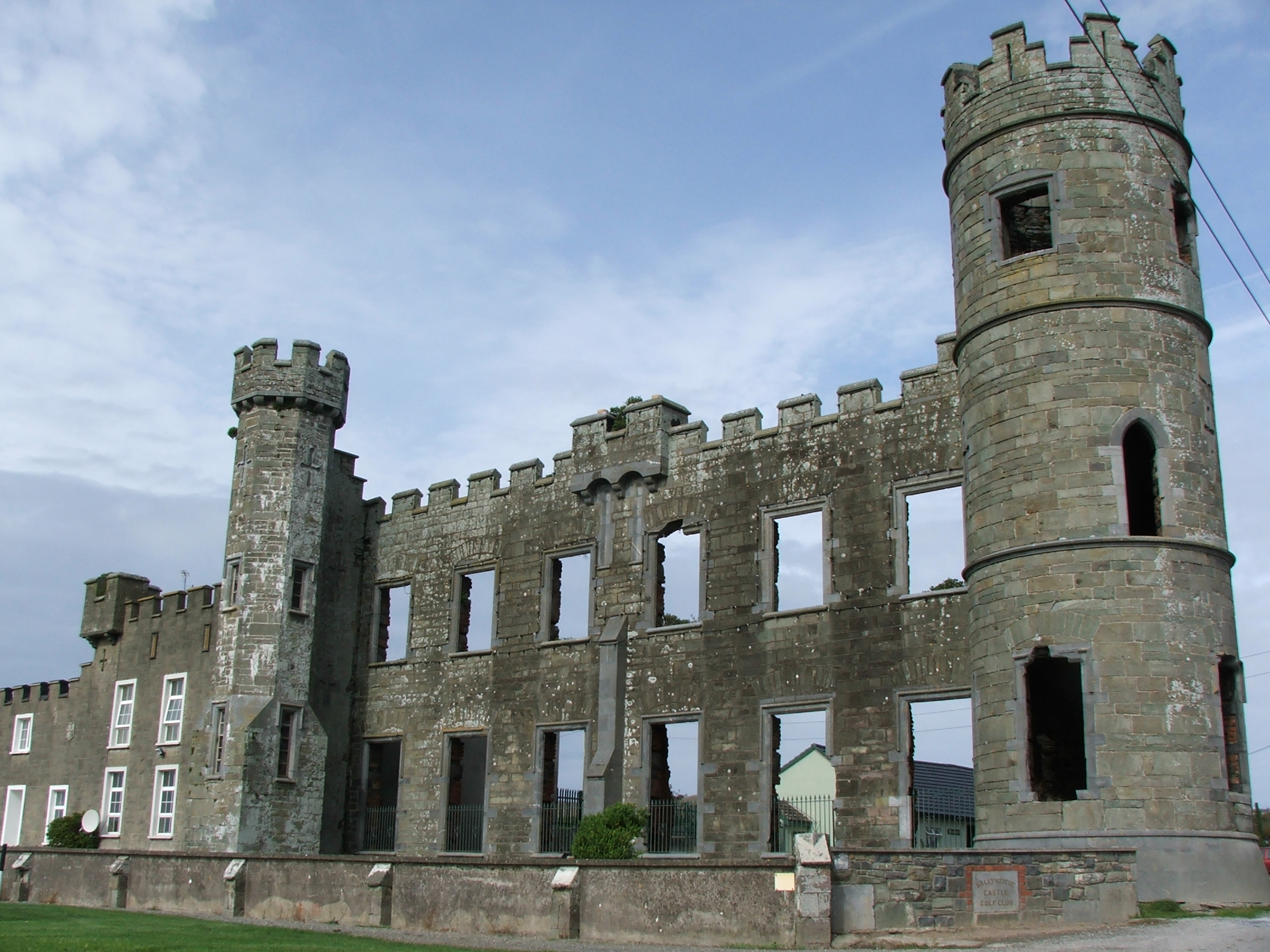
Ballyheigue Castle, showing the remains of the front elevation.

Ballyheigue Castle, in Ballyheigue, County Kerry, is a ruined Tudor-gothic-revival-style mansion. It was used as a residence of the Crosbie family (including the Bishop of Ardfert and Aghadoe, High Sheriffs of Kerry and members of the UK Parliament) and later as a jail. It has been burned twice. It is currently part of a golf course.

== History ==
It was enlarged in 1809 to a design by Richard Morrison on the site of an earlier house built in 1758 and incorporated part of the fabric of the original building. The 'castle' aspect of the name relates to the crenellations of the parapet. The large two-storey south-facing elevation with the entrance consisted of six bays flanked by three-storey, single-bay circular corner turrets. It was originally thatched and faced an enclosed courtyard. The site was the property of the Crosbie family, historically associated with the bishopric of Ardfert from the time of the Right Reverend John Crosbie (formerly Sean Mac an Chrosáin); before then the Mac an Chrosáin family were a bardic family of Leinster. From 1709, the property was the possession of Thomas Crosbie, member of parliament (MP) for Kerry (1709–10) and Dingle (1713-1731), High Sheriff of Kerry in 1712 and 1714. The line of succession followed: James Crosbie (1731, High Sheriff in 1751); Pierce Crosby (1761, High Sheriff in 1779, 1797); James Crosbie (1797, High Sheriff 1792, MP for Kerry (1797-1800); Pierce Crosbie (1836, High Sheriff 1815); James Crosbie (High Sheriff 1862, colonel Kerry Militia); James Dayrolles Crosbie (1865-1947) (High Sheriff 1894, Deputy Lieutenant Co. Kerry 1900, chairman of Tralee & Fenit Railway Co., Brigadier-General 1916–17, JP).

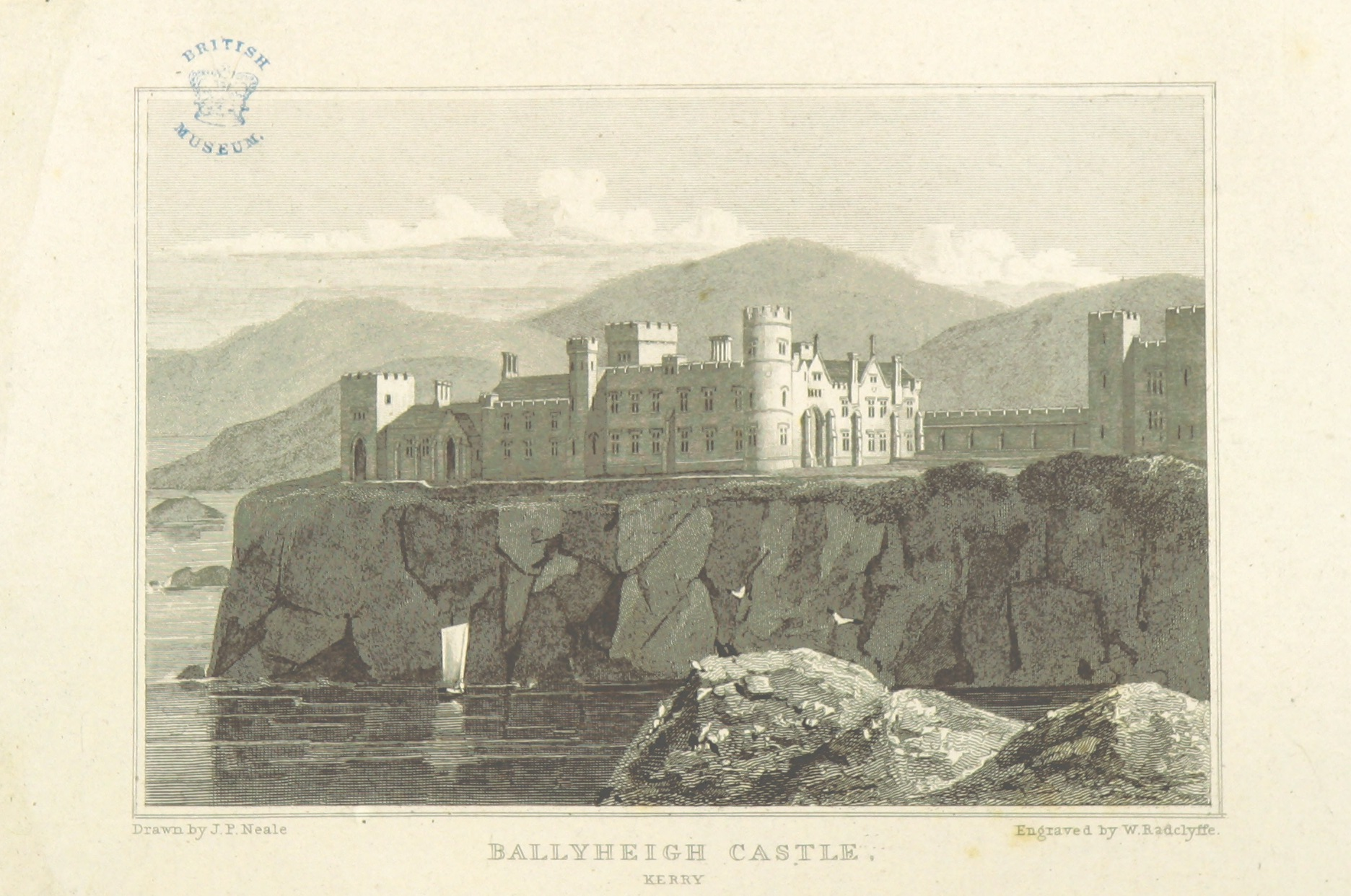
A romanticised view of Ballyheigue Castle by John Preston Neale, 1818. In reality, there is approximately 200m of land in front and continuous land either side.

=== War of Independence ===
From 1890, parts of the site were used a Royal Irish Constabulary (RIC) station. On the 1 December 1912, a hay shed at the Castle was set on fire; the following day, two further hay sheds were similarly destroyed, burning 200 tons of hay. James Crosbie made a claim for £1000 damages. From 1916 through to 1920, Crosbie auctioned the demesne lands of the estate to local people and also sold the Castle to Jeremiah Leen, ending the Crosbie connexion with Ballyheigue. In early 1921, the building was vacant. Later, a Mr. R. Palmer and Mrs. Erskine were resident in the castle for a few weeks. Erskine was involved in some Castle-related transaction with Palmer, a proprietor of local creameries. He planned to live in England and informed Michael Pierce, captain of the Ballyheigue Company of the Irish Volunteers, that the building was to be occupied by the British military. Pierce informed his battalion OC. In March 1921, the building was occupied by elements of the Royal Irish Constabulary. Following a sweep across north Kerry from the coast as far as Kilflynn to find IRA members, hundreds of men were detained in outbuildings on the site. On 25 May 1921, an auction of the buildings' contents was held at the castle. On 27 May, it was attacked and burned by local Irish Volunteers. In October the same year, Palmer was awarded £127 compensation by a Tralee court for furniture lost in the blaze. On 14 June 1923, Leen won a case in the King's Bench Division against Lloyd's of London underwriters who argued that he'd neglected to inform them that Crown forces had occupied the site and Sinn Féin members were interned there; he was awarded £9,500 and costs. During the proceedings, Thomas Clifford, a draper's assistant and IRA officer, admitted starting the blaze with petrol on floorboards after being ordered to destroy the castle.

== Apartments ==
A low part of the building to the left of the front elevation was reconstructed and remodelled as apartments in 1975.

== Golf course ==
In 1998, Ballyheigue Castle Golf Course was officially opened by the Minister for Foreign Affairs, Dick Spring, TD.
