= Cosby (surname) =

Cosby is a surname. Notable people with the surname include:

- Alexander Cosby (1685–1742), Irish military officer
- Andrew Cosby (born 1968), American comic book creator, film producer, and screenwriter
- Bill Cosby (born 1937), American actor, comedian, and alleged sex offender
- Bryce Cosby (born 1999), American football player
- Camille Cosby (born 1944), American author and wife of Bill Cosby
- Dabney Cosby (1793–1862), American architect and builder
- Dudley Cosby, 1st Baron Sydney (1730–1774), Irish politician and diplomat
- Ennis Cosby (1969–1997), American student and son of Bill Cosby who was murdered in 1997
- Erika Cosby (born 1965), artist and daughter of Bill Cosby
- Francis Cosby (1510–1580), English soldier and settler in Ireland
- George B. Cosby (1830–1909), Confederate States Army officer
- Gerry Cosby (1909–1996), American ice hockey player and businessman
- Henry Cosby (1928–2002), American songwriter and record producer
- Jessica Cosby (born 1982), American hammer thrower
- Joseph Hathaway Cosby (1902–1998), American pastor, US Army chaplain, and the second President of Hargrave Military Academy
- Mary Cosby (born 1972), American television personality
- Phillips Cosby (1729–1808), Royal Navy officer
- Quan Cosby (born 1982), American football player
- Rita Cosby (born 1964), TV reporter
- S. A. Cosby (1973) – American author
- William Cosby (1690–1736), British nobleman and governor of the New York Colony
- Vivian Cosby (1901–1963), American playwright

== Similar ==
- Crosby
- Crosbie
