= Robert Ballagh postage stamp designs =

Postage stamp designs by Irish artist Robert Ballagh

This list documents postage stamp designs by the Irish artist, Robert Ballagh for the Irish postal service.

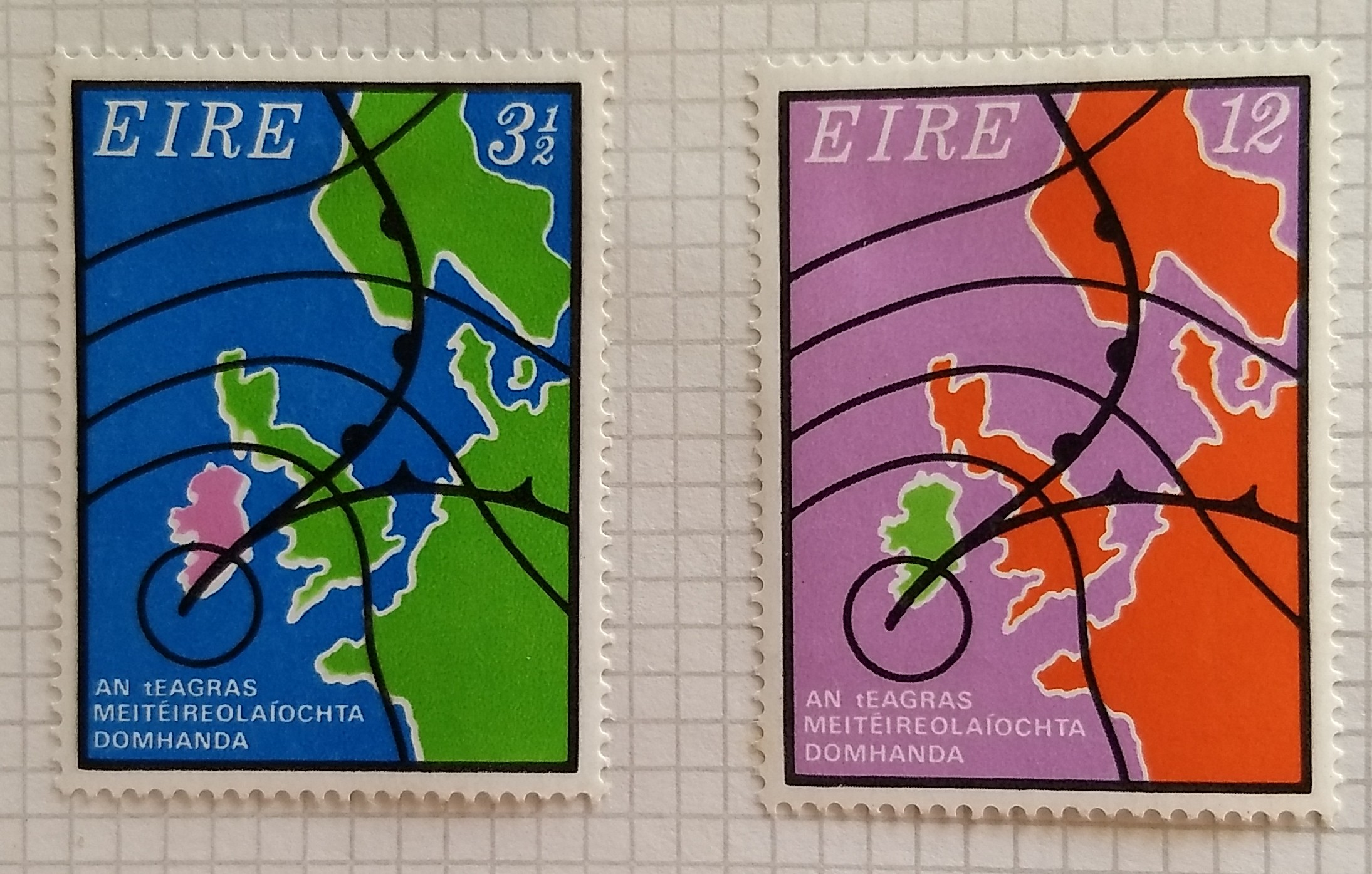
Irish stamps by Ballagh (1973), commemorating the centenary of the World Meteorological Organisation

Ballagh's first postage stamp design was released on 4 September 1973. It commemorated the centenary of the World Meteorological Organisation and depicted a weather map of northwestern Europe. His portrayal of Ireland did not show the border with Northern Ireland, provoking the unionist politician Ian Paisley to demand in the British House of Commons that the British government should make a formal objection, even though no other international borders were shown, either.

Later design contracts included the centenaries of the Universal Postal Union and the first telephone transmission, the golden jubilee of Ireland's national electricity utility, the centenaries of the births of Patrick Pearse and Éamon de Valera and commemorations of various other Irish statesmen, issues related to Scouting, Guiding and the Boys' Brigade, Irish festivals, the Irish lighthouse authority and one of Ireland's annual "love stamps".

One stamp design was rejected by the government, after stamps had already been printed, possibly due to political interference; the stamps and plates were destroyed. A version of the stamp was eventually released more than 15 years later. On another occasion, in 1994, he was commissioned to produce stamps commemorating five Irish Nobel Prize winners; four were released but the fifth was cancelled when the Irish postal service, An Post, belatedly realised that the subject, physicist Ernest Walton, was still alive.

Release date	Postage stamp theme
4 September 1973	Centenary of the World Meteorological Organisation.
9 October 1974	Centenary of the Universal Postal Union.
10 March 1976	Centenary of the first telephone transmission.
22 August 1977	Scouting and guiding.
12 September 1977	1100th anniversary of the death of Johannes Scotus Eriugena.
10 October 1977	Golden jubilee of the Electricity Supply Board.
13 April 1978	Fiftieth anniversary of the first east-west transatlantic flight.
18 September 1978	Bicentenary of the birth of Sister Catherine McAuley.
18 October 1978	Arrival onshore of Ireland's natural gas.
10 November 1979	Birth centenary of Pádraig Mac Piarais.
24 June 1981	Fiftieth anniversary of An Óige, the Irish Youth Hostel Association.
14 October 1982	Birth centenary of Éamon de Valera.
7 April 1983	Centenary of the Boys' Brigade.
11 August 1983	Centenary of the birth of Seán Mac Diarmada.
11 August 1983	Andrew Jackson (1767–1849). (Note: Seventh president of the United States.)
15 September 1983	World Communications Year. (Note: The United Nations designated 1983 as World Communications Year: Development of Communications Infrastructures.)
10 May 1984	Second direct elections to the European Parliament.
14 March 1985	Bicentenary of Dunsink Observatory.
14 March 1985	Bicentenary of the first aeronautic flight by an Irishman. (Note: Richard Crosbie flew in a hydrogen balloon from Ranelagh to Clontarf in 1785.)
20 June 1985	Birth centenary of Thomas Ashe.
27 May 1986	Fiftieth anniversary of Aer Lingus.
10 July 1986	Commissioners of Irish Lights.
21 August 1986	Centenary of the Dublin Council of Trade Unions.
21 August 1986	Statesmen of Ireland: Arthur Griffith.
27 August 1987	Festivals of Ireland. (Note: Four stamps portraying annual Irish festivals: the Fleadh Nua in Ennis, the Rose of Tralee festival, the Wexford Opera Festival, and the Ballinasloe Horse Fair.)
1 October 1987	Statesmen of Ireland: Cathal Brugha.
7 April 1988	Statesmen of Ireland: William T. Cosgrave.
27 July 1989	Statesmen of Ireland: Seán T. O'Kelly.
21 June 1990	Statesmen of Ireland: Michael Collins.
18 October 1990	Irish theatre. (Note: Four stamps portraying scenes from the plays Waiting for Godot, The Playboy of the Western World, Juno and the Paycock, and The Field.)
2 July 1991	Statesmen of Ireland: John A. Costello.
28 January 1992	Love stamp. (Note: Design partly inspired by Robert Indiana's Love design.)
15 October 1992	Single E.C. Market, 1992.
18 October 1994	Irish Nobel Prizewinners. (Note: Four stamps portraying Bernard Shaw, W. B. Yeats, Samuel Beckett, and Seán MacBride.)
6 April 1995	Europa: Peace and Freedom.
12 March 1996	L'Imaginaire Irlandais: Festival of Contemporary Irish Arts, France.
4 July 1996	150th Centenary of Birth of Michael Davitt.
6 May 1998	Bicentenary of United Irish Rebellion. (Note: Five stamps honouring the United Irishmen, Liberty, French Soldiers, Wolfe Tone, and Henry Joy McCracken.)
29 July 2003	Bicentenary of Rebellion of 1803. (Note: Three stamps portraying Robert Emmet, Thomas Russell, and Anne Devlin.)
11 April 2022	Postman with bicycle (from 1983: Art on a Stamp tenth definitive series).
