= Cosby =

Cosby may refer to:

- Cosby (surname)
  - Bill Cosby (born 1937), American stand-up comedian, actor, and author

== Media ==
- Cosby (TV series), an American sitcom that ran from 1996 to 2000, starring Bill Cosby
- The Bill Cosby Show, an American sitcom starring Bill Cosby that ran from 1969 to 1971 on NBC, starring Bill Cosby
- The Cosby Show, an American sitcom that ran from 1984 to 1992, starring Bill Cosby
- The Cosby Mysteries, a television mystery series that ran from 1994 to 1995, starring Bill Cosby
- House of Cosbys, a parody cartoon series
- "Cosby", a song by Kanye West from his unreleased album Cuck

== Places ==
- Cosby, Leicestershire, an English village
- Cosby, Missouri, a village
- Cosby, Tennessee, an unincorporated town
- YMCA Camp Cosby, a camping site in Alpine, Talladega County, Alabama

== Other ==
- Cosby High School, Midlothian, Virginia, United States
- HMS Cosby, a frigate of Britain's Royal Navy
