= Lone Rock, Washington =

Unincorporated community in Washington, United States

Lone Rock
- Unincorporated community
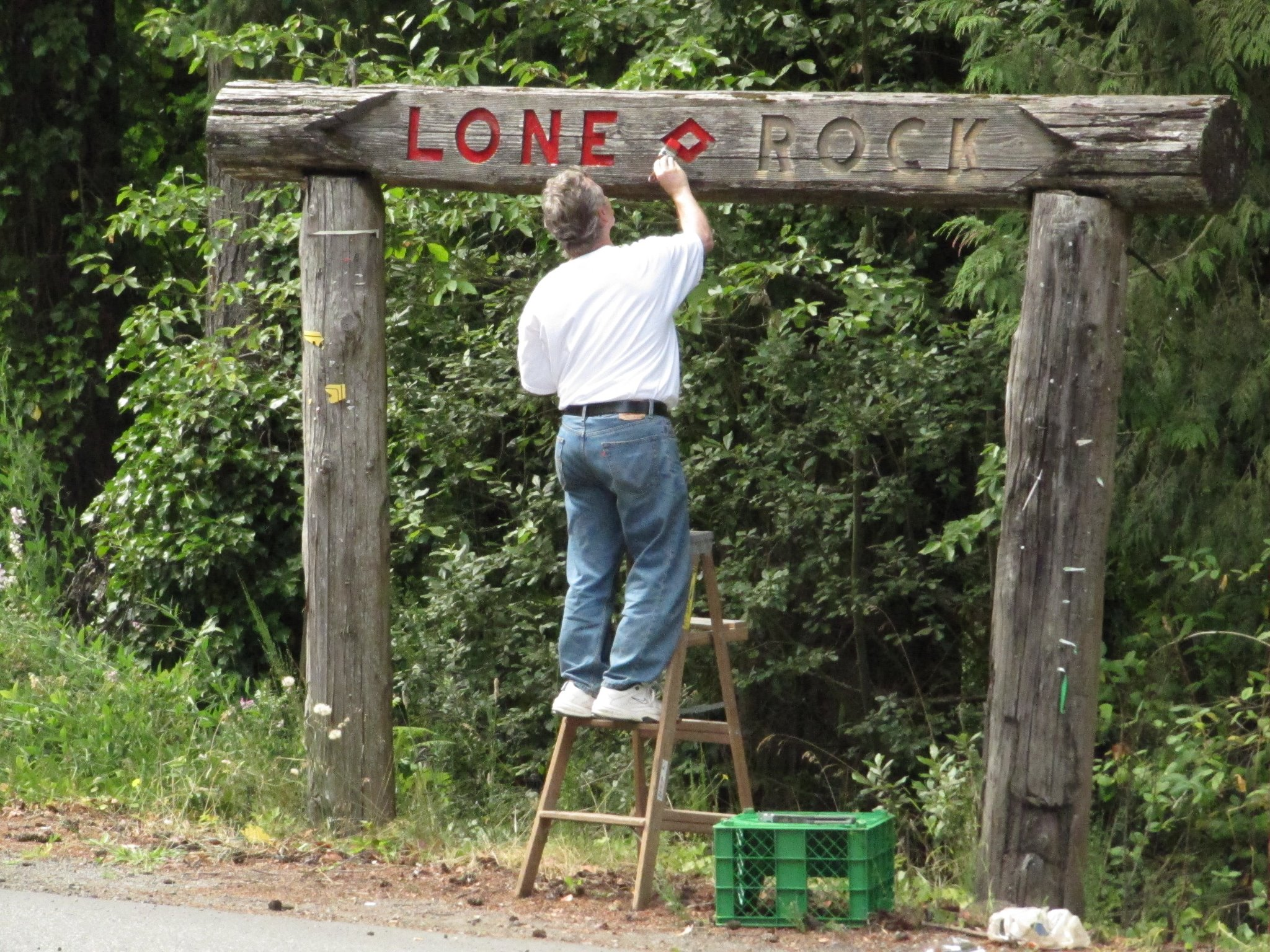
- The Lone Rock community sign gets a touch-up. The corner of Anderson Hill Road and Seabeck Highway, 2 August 2011

- Location in Washington and the United States Lone Rock (the United States)
- Coordinates: 47°39′29″N 122°46′33″W
- Country: United States
- State: Washington
- County: Kitsap
- Time zone: UTC-8 (Pacific (PST))
  - Summer (DST): UTC-7 (PDT)
- ZIP code: 98383
- GNIS feature ID: 1528864

Lone Rock is an unincorporated community on the coast of the Hood Canal in Kitsap County, Washington.

It gets its name from the glacial erratic boulder on the tidal flat about 400 feet off shore.

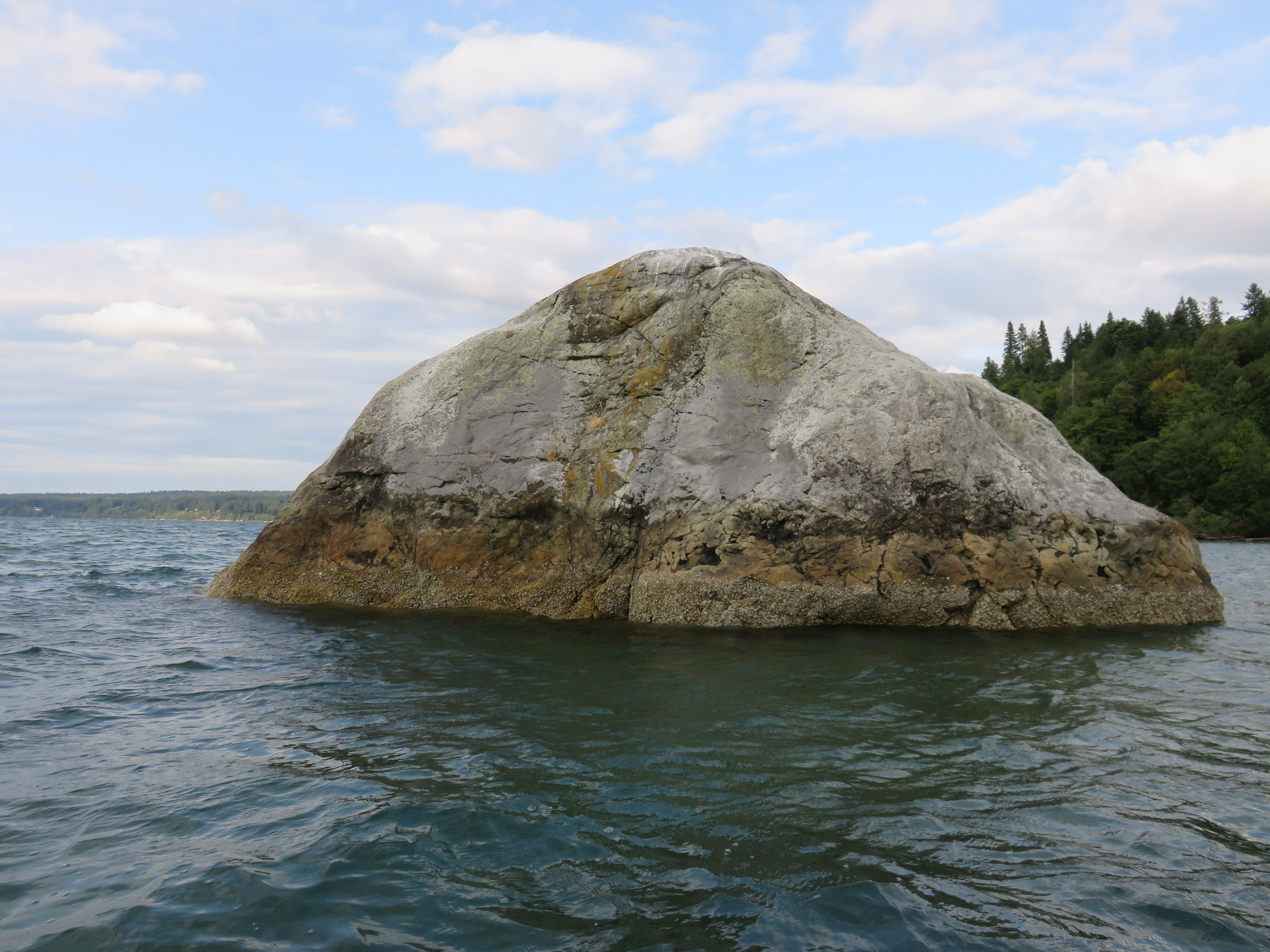
The Lone Rock, the namesake glacial erratic boulder, Hood Canal, Washington

Lone Rock is one of a small collection of historic rural communities in the western part of Kitsap County, which includes Seabeck, Holly, Camp Union, Crosby and Hintzville. The Lone Rock community club defines Lone Rock as running along the coast from Seabeck to Olympic View and inland to Willamette Meridian Road and Newberry Hill Road. Little Beef Creek is widely regarded as the dividing line between Lone Rock and Seabeck. In this view, Lone Rock includes the Big Beef and Little Anderson Creeks and spans the smaller communities of Warrenville, Lawters Beach and Anderson Landing.

== Bibliography ==
- Baker, Travis (December 22, 1996). "Lone Rock". Kitsap Sun. Bremerton, Wash.
