= William Crosbie =

William, Willie, Will or Bill Crosbie may refer to:

- William Crosbie (British Army officer) (1740–1798), British general
- William Crosbie (artist) (1915–1999), Scottish artist
- William Crosbie, 1st Earl of Glandore (1716–1781), Irish politician
- William Francis Crosbie (died 1768), Irish member of parliament
- William Crosbie (engineer), engineer and transportation planner in New Jersey
- Sir William Crosbie, 8th Baronet (1855–1936)
