= Listed buildings in Borrowby, west North Yorkshire =

Borrowby is a civil parish in the county of North Yorkshire, England. It contains 23 listed buildings that are recorded in the National Heritage List for England. All the listed buildings are designated at Grade II, the lowest of the three grades, which is applied to "buildings of national importance and special interest". The parish contains the village of Borrowby and the surrounding countryside. Apart from a former watermill to the south, all the listed buildings are in the village. Most of these are houses, cottages and associated structures, farmhouses and farm buildings, and the others include the village cross, a public house and a telephone kiosk.

== Buildings ==
Name and location	Photograph	Date	Notes
Village Cross; 54.29760°N 1.34368°W		Medieval	The village cross is in stone, and has a podium of three steps and a plinth. On this is a short shaft, a blocking course, and a rounded stone cross.
Ivy Farmhouse; 54.29798°N 1.34483°W	—	16th century	The farmhouse is in stone, and has a pantile roof with stone coping and shaped kneelers. There are two storeys and three bays. The doorway has a fanlight, most of the windows on the front are sashes, some with chamfered surrounds, and there is one casement window. At the rear are chamfered mullioned windows.
Borrowby Farmhouse; 54.29762°N 1.34290°W	—	Early 17th century	The farmhouse is in stone, and has a tile roof with stone coping and shaped kneelers. There are two storeys and three bays, and a single-storey single-bay wing on the right. All the openings have chamfered surrounds, the doorway is in the wing, and the windows either have a single light, or are mullioned with casements.
South Villa; 54.29450°N 1.34264°W	—	Early 17th century	The house, which was later altered, is in stone, and has a pantile roof with stone coping and shaped kneelers. There are two storeys and two bays. The doorway has a fanlight and is flanked by canted bay windows. The upper floor contains casement windows, and to the right is a blocked opening with a plain stone surround.
West End Farmhouse; 54.29749°N 1.34479°W	—	17th century	The farmhouse is in stone, and has a pantile roof with stone coping and shaped kneelers. There are two storeys and five bays. The doorway has a lintel and a moulded hood mould, and the windows are sashes. Inside, there is an inglenook fireplace.
Prospect House; 54.29783°N 1.34479°W	—	Early 18th century	The house is in stone, and has a pantile roof with moulded stone coping and shaped kneelers. There are two storeys, three bays, and a continuous rear outshut. The doorway has a chamfered surround and a stone lintel, and the windows are sashes in architraves.
Barossa Cottage; 54.29699°N 1.34350°W	—	Mid to late 18th century	The cottage is in stone, and has a pantile roof with stone coping and a shaped kneeler on the right. There are two storeys and two bays. In the centre is a doorway, and the windows are sashes, those in the ground floor with flat arches and voussoirs.
East View; 54.29690°N 1.34352°W	—	Mid to late 18th century	The house is in stone, and has a pantile roof with stone coping and shaped kneelers on the right. There are two storeys and two bays. The central doorway has an architrave, ribbed pilasters, a frieze and a cornice. To the right is a pair of shop windows with a frieze and a cornice, and the other windows are sashes, the ground floor window with a stone lintel.
Goose Green; 54.29773°N 1.34392°W	—	Mid to late 18th century	The house is in stone with quoins on the left, and a pantile roof with stone coping and a shaped kneeler on the left. There are two storeys and two bays. In the centre is a porch, flanked by sash windows with stone lintels, and in the upper floor are casement windows.
Hill Crest; 54.29801°N 1.34324°W	—	Mid to late 18th century	The house is in stone with a pantile roof. There are two storeys, two bays and a continuous rear outshut. To the right is a doorway with a stone lintel. The windows are casements, those in the ground floor with stone lintels and keystones.
Former post office and cottage 54.29774°N 1.34390°W		Mid to late 18th century	A pair of cottages, one previously a post office, in stone, that have a pantile roof with stone coping and a shaped kneeler on the right. There are two storeys and three bays. On the front are two doorways with stone lintels. To the left is a shop bay window with a cornice, and the other windows are horizontally-sliding sashes, those in the ground floor with stone lintels.
Rye House; 54.29846°N 1.34478°W	—	Mid to late 18th century	A house in stone that has a pantile roof with stone coping and shaped kneelers. There are two storeys and three bays. The doorway has a quoined surround, and a stone lintel and keystone. The windows are sashes with stone lintels and keystones.
Three Chimneys; 54.29457°N 1.34223°W	—	Mid to late 18th century	The house is in stone with quoins, a floor band, and a pantile roof with chamfered stone coping and kneelers. There are two storeys and three bays. The doorway has Doric half-columns on plinths, an entablature, a fanlight with radiating glazing bars, and an open pediment. The windows are sashes with plain surrounds.
Wheatsheaf Inn; 54.29678°N 1.34354°W		Mid to late 18th century	The public house is in stone, and has a pantile roof with stone coping and a shaped kneeler on the left. There are two storeys and three bays. In the centre is a doorway with a quoined surround, and a lintel with a keystone. The ground floor windows are sashes with flat arches and keystones, and in the upper floor are casement windows.
Borrowby Mill; 54.29191°N 1.33887°W	—	Late 18th century	A watermill and mill house, later two houses, in red brick and stone with a pantile roof. The former mill has three storeys and three bays, a dentilled cornice, and a roof with raised brick verges. It contains stable doorways with lintels and keystones, and the windows are sashes, most horizontally-sliding. The former mill house has two storeys and three bays, and a roof with stone coping and a shaped kneeler on the right. The windows, which are sashes, and the doorway, all have lintels with keystones.
Brittons House; 54.29504°N 1.34258°W	—	Late 18th century	The house is in stone, and has a pantile roof with stone coping and shaped kneelers. There are two storeys and two bays. The windows are casements with long stone lintels and keystones, and the doorway is in the adjacent cottage to the right.
Chapel Cottage; 54.29728°N 1.34440°W		Late 18th century	The house is in stone, and has a pantile roof with stone coping and shaped kneelers. There are two storeys and two bays. The windows are two-pane horizontally-sliding sashes, those in the ground floor with stone lintels and keystones, and the doorway is in the left return.
Borrowby Cottage; 54.29682°N 1.34317°W	—	Late 18th to early 19th century	The house is in stone, and has a pantile roof with stone coping and shaped kneelers. There are two storeys and three bays, and a single-storey single-bay extension on the right. In the centre is a doorway with a stone lintel, and the windows are horizontally-sliding sashes, those in the ground floor with stone lintels.
Grey House; 54.29618°N 1.34303°W	—	Late 18th to early 19th century	The house is in stone, and has a Welsh slate roof with stone coping and shaped kneelers. There are two storeys and three bays. Steps lead up to the central doorway, and the windows are sashes with stone lintels.
Arch House; 54.29774°N 1.34348°W	—	Early 19th century	The house is in stone, and has a Welsh slate roof with stone coping and a shaped kneeler on the right. There are two storeys and two bays. On the left is a carriage entrance with a segmental head, to its right is a doorway approached by steps, and the windows are sashes.
Fairmount; 54.29772°N 1.34361°W	—	Early 19th century	The house is in stone on a plinth, and has a Welsh slate roof with stone coping and a shaped kneeler on the left. There are two storeys and three bays. Steps lead up to the central doorway that has a decorative fanlight and a stone lintel. This is flanked by casement windows, the windows in the upper floor are sashes, and all the windows have architraves and stone lintels.
Pear Tree Cottage; 54.29593°N 1.34297°W	—	Early 19th century	The house is in stone, and has a pantile roof with stone coping and shaped kneelers. There are two storeys and two bays. The windows are sashes with stone lintels and sills, and the doorway is in the right return.
Telephone kiosk 54.29765°N 1.34383°W		1935	The K6 type telephone kiosk on the village green was designed by Giles Gilbert Scott. Constructed in cast iron with a square plan and a dome, it has three unperforated crowns in the top panels.
