= Crosbie baronets =

Extinct baronetcy in the Baronetage of Ireland

The Crosbie Baronetcy, of Maryborough in Queen's County, was created in the Baronetage of Ireland on 24 April 1630. The family was of Gaelic and Roman Catholic origin, but this branch converted to the Church of Ireland and Anglicized their name. Sir Walter, the first baronet, was the eldest son of John Crosbie, Bishop of Ardfert and Aghadoe, and a first cousin of the leading statesman Sir Piers Crosby. His brother David founded a junior branch of the family, which gained the title of Earl of Glandore. Sir Edward, the fifth baronet, was executed for treason after the 1798 Rebellion. The title became extinct on the death of the eighth baronet in 1936.

== Crosbie baronets, of Maryborough in Queen's County (1630) ==
- Sir Walter Crosbie, 1st Baronet (died c. 1638)
- Sir John Crosbie, 2nd Baronet (died c. 1695)
- Sir Warren Crosbie, 3rd Baronet (died 1759)
- Sir Paul Crosbie, 4th Baronet (died 1773)
- Sir Edward William Crosbie, 5th Baronet (c. 1755–1798)
- Sir William Crosbie, 6th Baronet (1794–1860)
- Sir William Richard Crosbie, 7th Baronet (1820–1877)
- Sir William Edward Douglas Crosbie, 8th Baronet (1855–1936)
