= James Dayrolles Crosbie =

Brigadier-General James Dayrolles Crosbie CMG DSO JP DL
- Born: 19 August 1865
- Died: 18 December 1947 (aged 82); Elie and Earlsferry, Scotland
- Military career
- Allegiance: United Kingdom
- Branch: British Army
- Service years: 1885–1893; 1914–1919
- Rank: Brigadier-General
- Commands: 16th Battalion Queen's Regiment; 12th Infantry Brigade; 11th Battalion Lancashire Fusiliers
- Conflicts: First World War
- Awards: Companion of the Order of St Michael and St George; Distinguished Service Order; Mentioned in Despatches

Brigadier-General James Dayrolles Crosbie, CMG, DSO, JP, DL (19 August 1865 – 18 December 1947) was an Irish Justice of the Peace, High Sheriff and Deputy Lieutenant of County Kerry, and a senior officer in the British Army during the First World War. He was the last in the Crosbie line to live in Ballyheigue Castle.

== Early life ==
Crosbie was born to Rosa Lister-Kaye (daughter of Sir John Kaye-Lister, 2nd Baronet) and James Crosbie, a colonel in the Kerry Militia. The Crosbie family was descended from an ancient bardic line from Leinster; the Right Reverend John Crosbie became an Anglican cleric and anglicised his name from Sean Mac an Chrosáin about 1583. Ballyheigue Castle was the official residence of the family. Crosbie inherited the castle and its demesne after the death of his father in 1879.

== Career ==
Crosbie went to Eton College and was commissioned in the 2nd Battalion Royal Welch Fusiliers in 1885. He had officer training at the Royal Military College, Sandhurst. He left the military in 1893. He was a Justice of the Peace and became High Sheriff of Kerry in 1894 and the same year married Maria Caroline Leith on 28 July. They had one child, Oonagh Mary Crosbie. Active on local committees, he became the chairman of the 3 km-long Tralee & Fenit Railway Company, which opened in 1887. He was appointed Deputy Lieutenant of Kerry in 1900. He operated his lands as a working farm throughout his time there and the produce was advertised for sale locally. Cattle from the farm were entered into Kerry competitions. With the outbreak of the First World War, he rejoined the army in 1914 as commander of the 11th Battalion Lancashire Fusiliers, was promoted to brigadier-general in the 12th Infantry Brigade and returned home in 1917. Thereafter he commanded the 16th Battalion Queen's Regiment and was base commandant of Arkhangelsk (Archangel) (under General Sir Edmund Ironside). While in Russia, he learned that Ballyheigue Castle had been burned. He received the Distinguished Service Order in 1917 and was appointed Companion of the Order of St Michael and St George in 1919.

Between 1912 and 1919 [sources vary], he sold the demesne lands of the Ballyheigue Castle estate to local people and sold the castle itself to Jeremiah Leen, ending the centuries-old link between the Crosbie family and Ballyheigue. The castle buildings were used by the Royal Irish Constabulary from 1890, and were subject to arson attacks in 1912 (after Crosbie attended a Unionist meeting in Tralee and seconded a motion against the Home Rule bill being debated in the UK Parliament) and again after their sale in 1921, in a fire started by Irish Volunteers. After his return from Russia, he resided in County Wicklow before buying Muircambus House in Fife, settling there with his family. In Scotland, he was a representative in local government for the Kilconquhar district. He was County Convener between 1938 and 1945, Convener of the Education and Finance Committees and became Chairman of the Scottish County Councils Association in 1942. He retired in 1945 for health reasons. He was also a Justice of the Peace and Deputy Lieutenant (1936) in Scotland. He was vice-president of the East Fife Unionist Association and a leading member in various other groups.

He died in 1947 aged 83 in a nursing home in Elie. He was survived by his wife and daughter.
