= Borrowby, west North Yorkshire =

Village and civil parish in North Yorkshire, England

Coordinates: 54.29701°N 1.34335°W

Borrowby
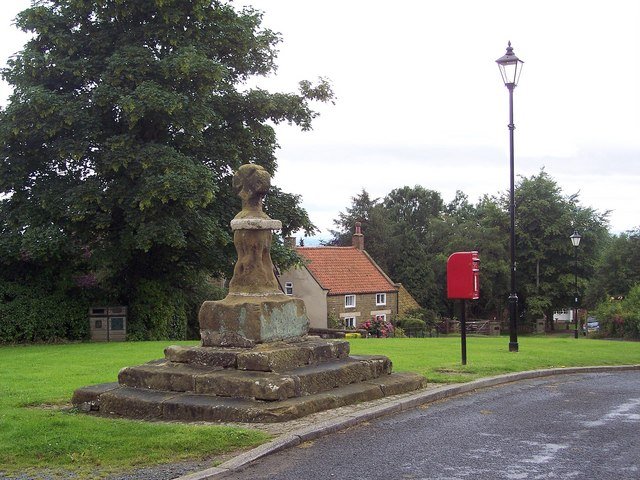
- The Market Cross (and Preaching Stone) at Borrowby

- Location within North Yorkshire
- Population: 386 (Including Leake. 2011 census)
- OS grid reference: SE428892
  - London: 200 mi (320 km) S
- Civil parish: Borrowby
- Unitary authority: North Yorkshire
- Ceremonial county: North Yorkshire
- Region: Yorkshire and the Humber
- Country: England
- Sovereign state: United Kingdom
- Post town: THIRSK
- Postcode district: YO7
- Police: North Yorkshire
- Fire: North Yorkshire
- Ambulance: Yorkshire

Borrowby is a village and civil parish in North Yorkshire, England. It is situated halfway between Thirsk and Northallerton, about 25 miles (40 km) north of York, in the Vale of Mowbray, a low-lying agricultural landscape shaped by the last glaciation, which lies between two national parks, the North York Moors to the east and the Yorkshire Dales to the west.

From 1974 to 2023 it was part of the Hambleton District. It is now administered by the unitary North Yorkshire Council.

== History ==
Borrowby is one of the so-called Hillside Villages and can be found towards the eastern fringe of the vale where the land begins to rise to the moors. The village is said to be of Danish origin (ending –by) when it was some kind of stronghold. It was then mentioned in the 1086 Domesday Book and other early records under various spellings of "Berghby" meaning 'village on a hill'. This exposed location has always been good for growing orchards as the hill tops escaped the glacial debris and cannot be reached by the flood plains of the river, the Cod Beck. Borrowby was once part of the parish of Leake, which is further north, and in the first half of the 19th century there was an extensive manufacture of linen. Since 1978 the village has been a conservation area.

The village grew in a linear form along the main road sloping upwards to the north. It is characteristic that to the front the buildings are separated by a broad grass verge to the main road and the backs of the properties are associated with the adjoining long plots that are accessed via a back lane. A triangular street formation divides High Borrowby from Low Borrowby and acts as a village green and centre with a public house, (The Wheatsheaf Inn), village hall and church. On the village green is an old cross which is said to have marked the border between Borrowby and the town of Gueldable, (and the two Wapentakes of Allerton and Birdforth) at a time when both townships were completely intermixed.

In the year 2000, a wooden footbridge was installed over the Cod Beck to allow walkers to cross into the neighbouring parish of Crosby; the previous footbridge was washed away in 1947.

The annual Borrowby Show is held each year July (except years affected by the COVID pandemic).

== See also ==
- Listed buildings in Borrowby, west North Yorkshire
