= Listed buildings in Crosby, North Yorkshire =

Crosby is a civil parish in the county of North Yorkshire, England. It contains three listed buildings that are recorded in the National Heritage List for England. All the listed buildings are designated at Grade II, the lowest of the three grades, which is applied to "buildings of national importance and special interest". The parish contains the village of Crosby and the surrounding countryside, and all the listed buildings are farmhouses.

== Buildings ==
Name and location	Photograph	Date	Notes
Old Hall Farmhouse; 54.30659°N 1.36608°W		Early to mid 18th century	The farmhouse is in red brick and stone, with brick quoins, dentilled eaves, and a pantile roof with stone coping and shaped kneelers. There are two storeys and four bays. The doorway has a quoined surround, a flat arch and a keystone, and the windows are sashes, one in the upper floor horizontally-sliding. Inside, there is an inglenook fireplace.
Crosby Bridge Farmhouse; 54.30721°N 1.36590°W	—	Mid 18th century (probable)	The farmhouse is in stone, with quoins, and a pantile roof with stone coping and shaped kneelers. There are two storeys and two bays. In the centre is a brick porch, and the windows have long lintels with keystones.
Crosby Grange; 54.29180°N 1.37685°W	—	18th century	A farmhouse with two storeys and four bays, a left outshut, and a pantile roof with stone coping and shaped kneelers. The left two bays are in brick and the right two bays are in stone. The doorway has a three-pane fanlight and a flat brick arch. The windows are casements with flat brick arches, those in the left two bays with brick sills, and those in the right two bays with stone sills and keystones.
