= Sir William Crosbie, 8th Baronet =

Sir William Edward Douglas Crosbie, 8th Baronet (1855-1936) was an Irish baronet, the eighth of the Crosbie baronets of Maryborough in Queen's County.

== Biography ==
Born on 13 October 1855, the eldest son of Sir William Richard Crosbie, 7th Baronet (1820-1877) and Catherine Madden, Sir William Crosbie, 8th Baronet was educated at Bedford School. He was the eighth of the Crosbie baronets of Maryborough in Queen's County, created on 24 April 1630 for Sir Walter Crosbie, 1st Baronet (d. 1638), succeeding to the title upon the death of his father on 6 May 1877. He was the great-grandson of Sir Edward Crosbie, 5th Baronet, the first United Irishman to be wrongfully executed for treason after the Irish Rebellion of 1798.

Sir William Crosbie, 8th Baronet married firstly Georgina Marsh, by whom he had one daughter, and secondly Rose Moule. He died on 30 December 1936 without male issue and the Crosbie baronetcy became extinct.

Baronetage of Ireland
Preceded by William Crosbie	Baronet (of Maryborough in Queen's County); 1877 – 1936	Extinct
