= David Crosby (disambiguation) =

David Crosby (1941–2023) was an American musician.

David Crosby may also refer to:

- David Douglas Crosby (born 1949), Canadian prelate of the Roman Catholic Church
- Dave Crosby, musician in Rheostatics
- Dave Crosby, singer, contestant on the American The Voice in 2017

== See also ==
- David Crosbie (disambiguation)
- David Crausby (born 1946), British politician
