= Don O'Neill (fashion designer) =

Irish fashion designer

- Born: 12 June 1966 (age 60); Ballyheigue, County Kerry, Ireland
- Education: Barbara Bourke College of Fashion Design
- Label: THEIA

Don O'Neill (born 1966) is an Irish fashion designer.

== Early life ==
He was born in the seaside village of Ballyheigue, County Kerry, Ireland. Initially training as a chef, O’Neill was able to study to be a fashion designer, his true passion, after winning a full tuition scholarship to the Barbara Bourke College of Fashion Design. After traveling the world and working for famous designers and fashion houses such as Christian Lacroix, he arrived in New York, where he spent ten years working with evening-wear designer Carmen Marc Valvo and three years as head of the Badgley Mischka diffusion label. In 2009, THEIA was launched. As of 2013, O'Neill served as the Creative Director of the label.

He has dressed Carrie Underwood at the 2013 Grammys and Oprah Winfrey at the 2012 Oscars.

O’Neill married in 2016. As of 2023, he resides in Ireland.
