= Crossby =

Crossby is a given name and surname. Notable people with the name include:

- Crossby Vusi Shongwe (fl. from 2024), South African politician
- N. Robin Crossby (1954–2008), Canadian game designer

== See also ==
- Crosby
