= Paul Crosby =

Paul Crosby may refer to:

- Paul Crosby (basketball), American basketball player
- Paul Crosby (criminal), Irish criminal
- Paul Crosby, drummer with Saliva (band)

== See also ==
- Paul Crosbie, football player and manager
- Paul P. Crosbie, Communist Party politician
