= Crosby (surname) =

Crosby is an English, Scottish, and Irish surname. Notable people with the surname include:

- Alfred W. Crosby (1931–2018), American historian
- Andrew Crosby, Canadian rower
- Andy Crosby, English footballer
- Bing Crosby, American entertainer
  - Members of his family:
    - Bob Crosby, brother, American bandleader and singer
    - Chris Crosby (singer), nephew
    - Denise Crosby, granddaughter, American actress
    - Dennis Crosby, son, American actor
    - Gary Crosby (actor), son, American singer and actor
    - Harry Crosby (businessman), son, American actor, singer and investment banker
    - Kathryn Crosby, second wife, American actress
    - Larry Crosby, brother and his long-time publicity director
    - Lindsay Crosby, son, American actor and singer
    - Mary Crosby, daughter, American actress
    - Nathaniel Crosby, son, American golfer
    - Phillip Crosby, son, American actor and singer
- Bobby Crosby, American baseball player
- Bridgette Crosby, fictional character in the DC Universe
- Bubba Crosby, American baseball player
- Cathy Lee Crosby, American actress
- Charles A. Crosby, former mayor of the town of Yarmouth, Nova Scotia, Canada
- Charles F. Crosby, American politician
- Charles N. Crosby, U.S. Congressman from Pennsylvania
- Charlotte Crosby (born 1990), English television personality
- Chris Crosby (webcomics), American cartoonist, writer, co-founder of Keenspot
- Clarkson F. Crosby (1817–1858), New York politician
- Cornilia Thurza Crosby, American outdoorsman and the first Registered Maine Guide
- Darius Crosby (c. 1768 – 1818), New York politician
- David Crosby (1941–2023), American singer-songwriter
- Dom Crosby (born 1990), British rugby league footballer
- Don Crosby, Australian actor
- Ed Crosby, American baseball player
- Edward W. Crosby, African-American educator
- Emma Crosby, English newsreader
- Enoch Crosby (1750–1835), American spy and soldier during the American Revolutionary War
- Ernest Howard Crosby, American reformer and author
- Fanny Crosby, American lyricist
- Faye Crosby, American psychologist
- Floyd Crosby, American cinematographer
- Frederick Gordon Crosby, English automotive artist
- Gary Crosby (bassist), English jazz musician
- Gary Crosby (footballer), English footballer
- Harrison Woodhull Crosby, American businessman
- Harry Herbert Crosby, American professor, author and B-17 Flying Fortress navigator
- Harry Crosby, American heir and bon vivant
- Howard Crosby (minister), American preacher and teacher
- Howard Edward Crosby, Canadian politician
- Hugh Powell Crosby, Canadian politician
- James Crosby (banker) (born 1956), English banker
- James V. Crosby (born 1952), American prison officer
- Jim Crosby (1873–1960), South African rugby union player
- Joan Crosby
  - Joan Crosby (1920–2013), English table tennis player
  - Joan Crosby, American actress, known for Cotton Candy
- John Crosby (conductor) (1926–2002), American founding director of the Santa Fe Opera, 1957 to 2000
- John Crosby (media critic), American media critic for the New York Herald Tribune
- John C. Crosby (1859–1943), American politician
- John S. Crosby (general) (1932–2022), American lieutenant general
- Jon Crosby, American musician
- Juliette Crosby (1895–1969), American actress
- Justin Crosby, American politician
- Ken Crosby, Canadian baseball player
- Kenneth Crosby (1904–1998), British Wesleyan missionary, bible translator and language scholar
- Kim Crosby, American racecar driver
- Kim Crosby (singer), American singer and actress
- LaVon Crosby, American politician
- Lorraine Crosby, English singer
- Lynton Crosby, Australian political campaign strategist
- Malcolm Crosby, English former footballer and manager
- Mason Crosby, American football placekicker
- Matthew Crosby, English comedian
- Maxx Crosby, American football player
- Nathaniel Crosby, American golfer
- Norm Crosby (1927–2020), American comedian
- Oscar Terry Crosby (1861–1947), American engineer, author, and explorer
- Patrick Crosby, professional indoor lacrosse goalie
- Paul Crosby (disambiguation)
- Peirce Crosby, admiral in the United States Navy
- Philip B. Crosby, American businessman and author known for zero-defects quality management theory
- Robbin Crosby, American rock guitarist
- Robert B. Crosby, American Republican politician
- Ron Crosby, American football player
- Sidney Crosby, Canadian ice hockey player
- Stephen Crosby (1808–1869), American politician
- Stephen Moody Crosby (1827–1909) American politician
- Steve Crosby (born 1950), American football coach and player
- Thomas Crosby (missionary) (1840–1914), English missionary in Canada
- Thomas Crosby (Baptist) (1683–1751), English writer
- Tom Crosby Jr. (1928–2011), American politician
- Tyrell Crosby, American football player
- William Crosby Dawson, American lawyer, judge, politician and soldier from Georgia
- William Holmes Crosby Jr., American physicist, hematologist, inventor and translator

== See also ==
- Crosbie
