= Piers Crosby =

Irish soldier and politician

- Born: 1590; Ireland
- Died: 1646 (aged 55–56); Ireland
- Occupations: Politician, soldier

Sir Piers Crosby (1590–1646) was an Irish soldier and politician. Crosby was also a leading Irish magnate, owning various estates across the island. He was a man of strong and determined character, and had sufficient political skills to help bring about the downfall and death of the Earl of Stafford, who in the 1630s had been virtually all-powerful in Ireland.

== Family background ==
Crosby was of Gaelic Irish descent; his father Padraig Mac an Chrosáin (died 22 March 1611), had been active in English service since 1588 and helped transplant the septs of Laois into County Kerry. While remaining a Roman Catholic, he anglicised his name to Patrick Crosby. His younger brother, a Protestant convert, was John Crosbie, Bishop of Ardfert and Aghadoe, ancestor of the Crosbie baronets. Patrick married Catherine, and in his will mentions his niece "Joan Moore" indicating that his wife may have been an O'More.

== Biography ==
Sir Piers commanded an Irish regiment in the Duke of Buckingham's unsuccessful expedition to support La Rochelle in 1627. During the retreat, Crosby commanded the rearguard. Buckingham, who was the Royal Favourite of Charles I, developed a high opinion of Crosby and supported his career, until his assassination in 1628. Due to Buckingham's influence Crosby was appointed to both the English and Irish Privy Councils. Crosby became a noted courtier, associated in particular with Queen Henrietta Maria and her favourite Henry Rich, 1st Earl of Holland.

Crosby married firstly Sarah Barnewall, daughter of Sir Patrick Barnewall of Turvey and his second wife Mary Bagenal, who died before March 1618, leaving an only daughter, Elizabeth, who died young. He married secondly Elizabeth Noel, daughter of Sir Andrew Noel and widow of George Tuchet, 1st Earl of Castlehaven, and was, therefore, the stepfather of Mervyn Tuchet, 2nd Earl of Castlehaven. Through her, Crosby was able to obtain lands in County Armagh and County Tyrone after contending that the 2nd Earl had not fulfilled his obligations under the Plantation of Ulster. Crosby raised the issue in 1628, and in 1630 the King ruled in his favour. Crosby was one of several figures who stood to gain if Castlehaven died a felon when the Earl was charged, tried, convicted and executed in 1631, following allegations of rape and sodomy made by his wife and son.

== Thomas Wentworth, 1st Earl of Strafford ==
Crosby became a leading opponent of the dominant figure in Irish politics in the 1630s, the Lord Deputy Thomas Wentworth. Wentworth in return despised Crosby, whom he referred to with contempt as "the tawny ribbon", perhaps a reference to his fondness for fine clothes. Wentworth also accused Crosby of leading a debauched private life.

In 1634 he was returned to the Irish House of Commons as Member of Parliament for Queen's County. He voted in Parliament against a Bill to strengthen the laws against being an accessory to murder, to which Wentworth attached great importance. Crosby attacked Wentworth for failing to honour previously pledged concessions to Catholics ("the Graces"). He remained a member of the Privy Council of Ireland, but in 1634 Wentworth, in an unprecedented move, persuaded the council to forbid his attendance there, in retaliation for his voting against the legislation on murder. In 1639 he was prosecuted in Star Chamber for libelling Wentworth, by claiming that he had killed one Captain Esmonde by ill-treatment, a charge which was almost certainly untrue; he was also accused of perjuring himself during the trial. At the same time Crosby's patron the Earl of Holland, another of Wentworth's ever-growing list of enemies, was spreading rumours that Wentworth was insane, giving Crosby as his source.

Along with Wentworth's other Irish enemies, Crosby supplied evidence for the prosecution when Wentworth was tried by the English Parliament for misgovernment in 1641, leading to his attainder and execution. Strafford in his eloquent defence referred to the old charge of perjury against Crosby. He marvelled (ironically) at Crosby's amazing ability to remember verbatim a conversation with Strafford which had supposedly taken place seven years earlier, when "in truth I never had such a discourse with him in my life".

Crosby was a political ally of the powerful Earl of Cork, another implacable enemy of Wentworth. During this period, Crosby either raised or offered to raise Irish troops for military service overseas for both the Crown and other nations on a number of occasions. Along with other Irish noblemen, he offered his services to the King during the Scottish Crisis when it was planned for an Irish Army to make a landing on the Scottish coast.

== Last years ==
Following the outbreak of the Irish Rebellion in 1641, Crosby was initially neutral. He later joined the Irish Confederates and also spent some time abroad. In 1643 he returned from France to Ireland. He was identified with the moderate faction which supported a quick settlement with Charles I, so that the Irish Confederates could send an expedition against their mutual enemy the English Parliamentarians.

He died in 1646 after being imprisoned by a rival faction in the leadership of the Irish Confederacy. He had no surviving children by either marriage, and his estates passed to his cousin, Sir Walter Crosbie, first of the Crosbie baronets, a son of Bishop Crosbie. His second wife Elizabeth was still living in 1644: her precise date of death is not recorded.

== Bibliography ==
- Gentles, I.J. The English Revolution and the Wars in the Three Kingdoms, 1638–1652. Pearson, 2007.
- Herrup, Cynthia B. A House in Gross Disorder: Sex, Law, and the 2nd Earl of Castlehaven. Oxford University Press, 1999.
- Kearney, Hugh F. Strafford in Ireland 1633–1641: A Study in Absolutism. Cambridge University Press, 1989.
- Ohlmeyer, Jane. Civil War and Restoration in the Three Stuart Kingdoms. Cambridge University Press, 1993.
- O Siochru, Micheal. Confederate Ireland, 1642–1649. A Constitutional and Political Analysis. Four Courts Press, 1999.
- Wedgwood, C.V. Thomas Wentworth, 1st Earl of Strafford 1593-1641- a revaluation Phoenix Press reissue 2000
