= Ballyheigue =

Seaside resort in County Kerry, Ireland

Ballyheigue Baile Uí Thaidhg
- Town
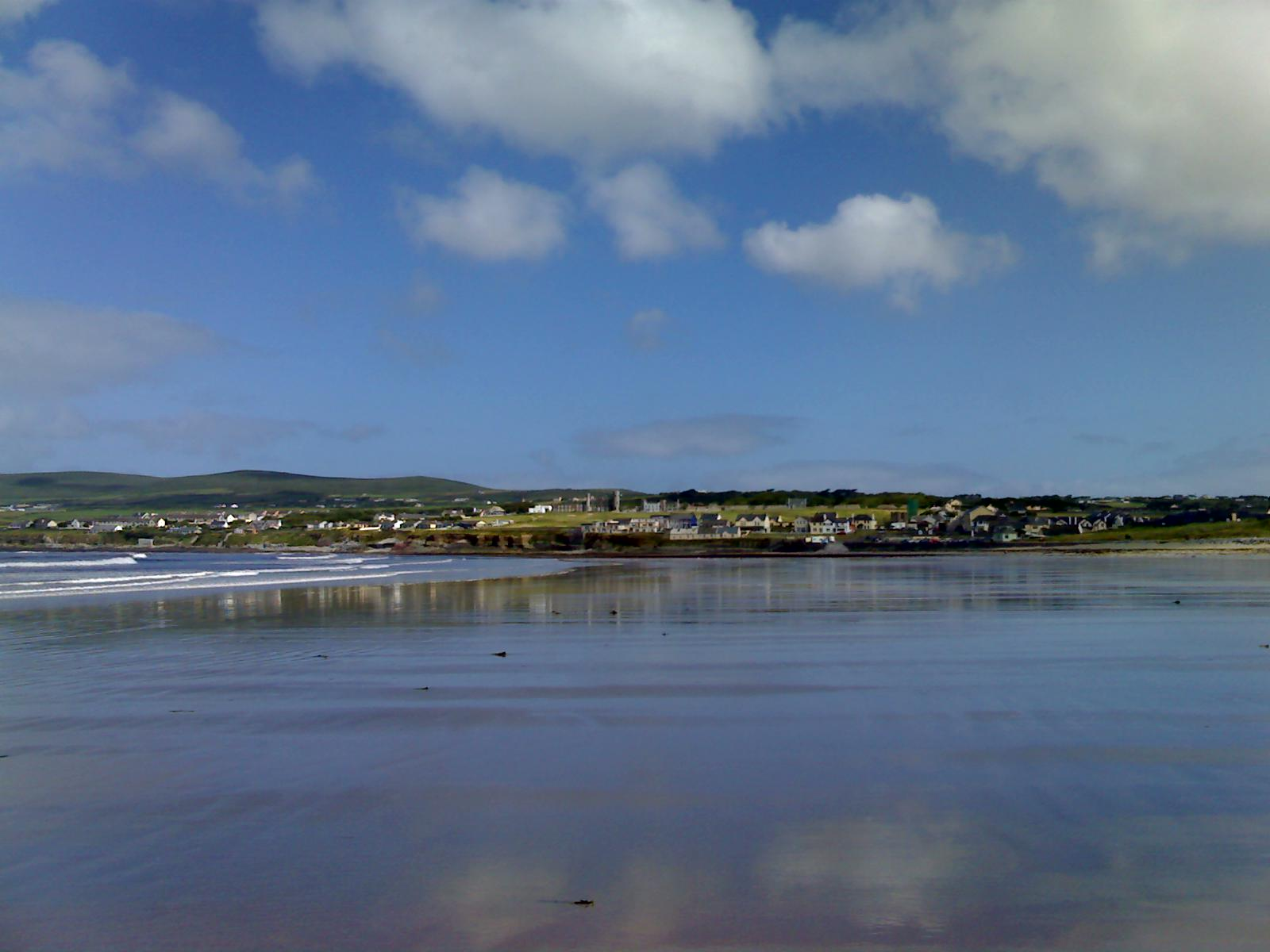
- Ballyheigue as viewed from the nearby beach

- Location in Ireland
- Coordinates: 52°23′21″N 9°50′00″W
- Country: Ireland
- Province: Munster
- County: County Kerry

Area
  - Total: 45 km^{2} (17 sq mi)

Population (2022)
  - Total: 546
  - Density: 12/km^{2} (31/sq mi)
- Time zone: UTC+00:00 (GMT)
  - Summer (DST): UTC+01:00 (IST)
- Irish Grid Reference: Q782211

Ballyheigue (/ˌbæliˈhaɪɡ/ BAL-ee-HYEG), officially Ballyheige (Irish: Baile Uí Thaidhg, meaning 'town(land) of Tadhg'), is a coastal town and civil parish in County Kerry, Ireland. It is 18 km (11 mi) northwest of Tralee along the R551 road. It is a scenic locale which forms part of the Wild Atlantic Way and has several miles of beaches that connect to Banna Strand to the south, and Kerry Head to the north. Ballyheigue beach was identified in 2026 as the best beach in Ireland by the Condé Nast Traveler Readers' Choice Awards. Local events include the "Half on the Head" (Kerryhead) half marathon in June and an annual summer festival in July.

Evidence of ancient settlement in the area includes multiple ringfort, souterrain, holy well, Bullaun stone and fulacht fiadh sites in Ballyheige, Buncurrig, Dirtane and other surrounding townlands. Ballyheigue Castle, a ruined Tudor Gothic Revival style country house, was built in 1809 on the site of an earlier house.

The local Gaelic Athletic Association (GAA) club is Ballyheigue GAA.

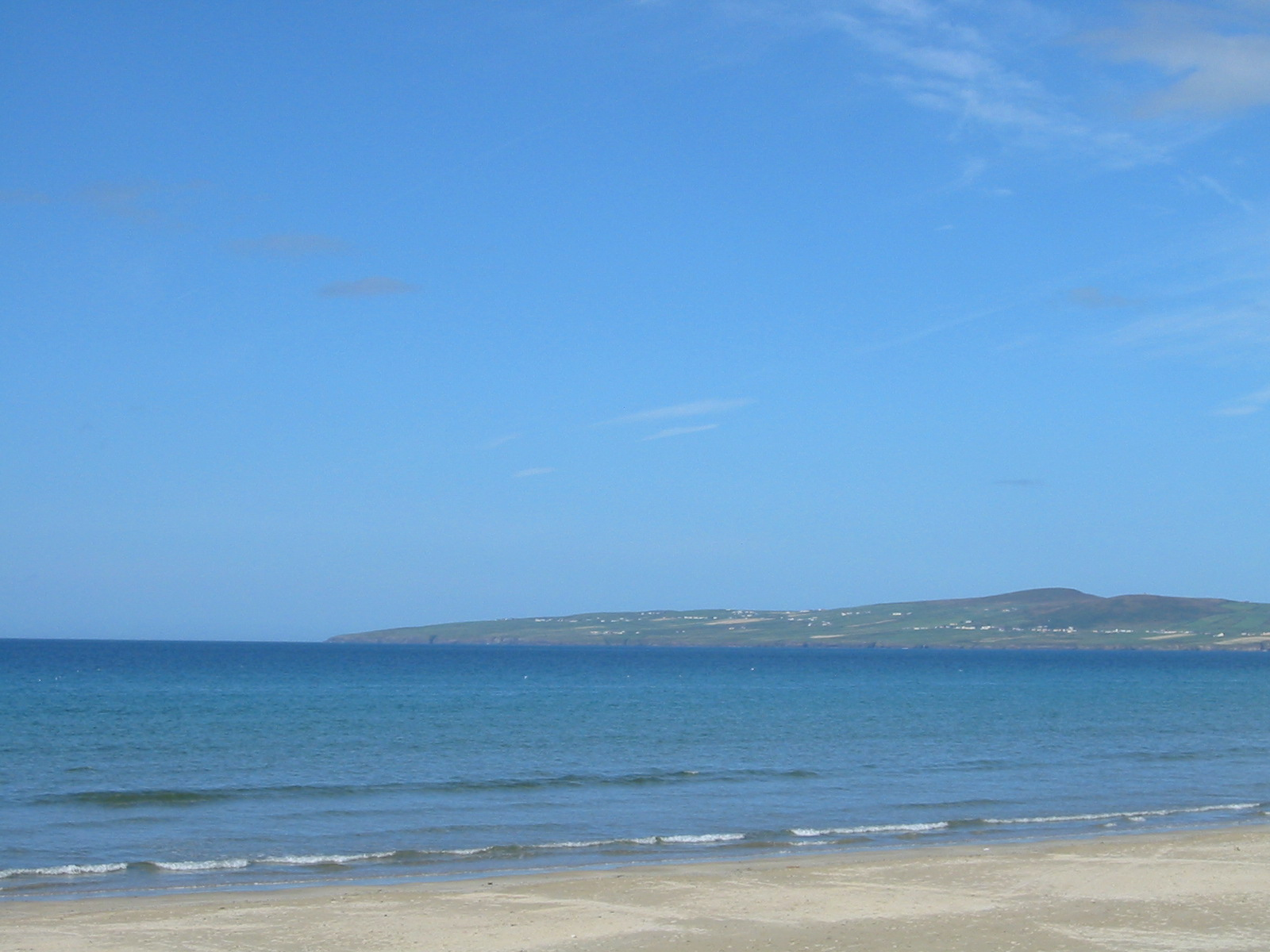
Ballyheigue Strand

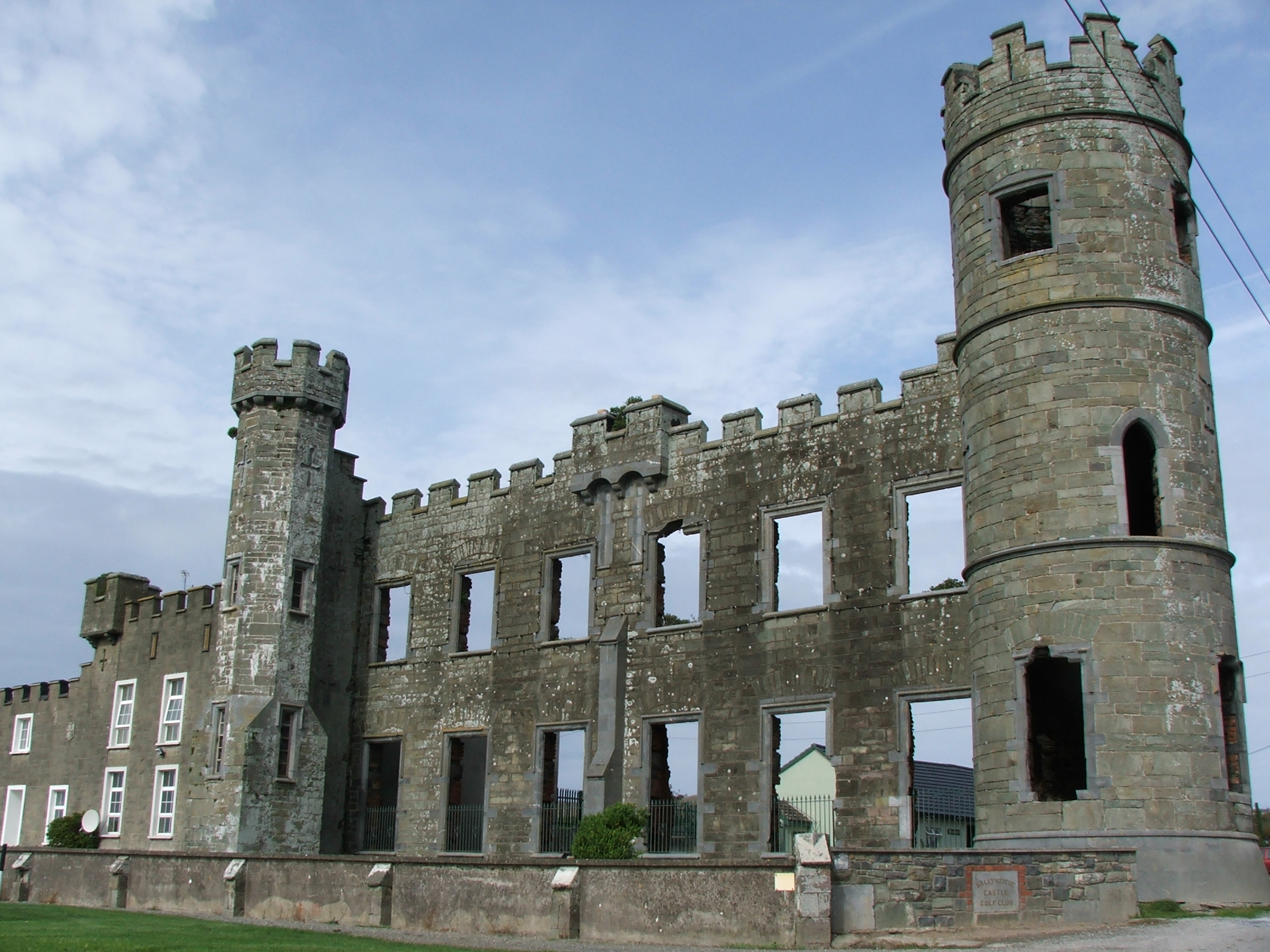
Ballyheigue Castle

== Notable people ==
- Christy Brown, Irish writer and painter, resided in Ballyheigue from 1975 to 1980.
- Richard Cantillon, economic theorist and coiner of the term entrepreneur. Born in Ballyronan, in Ballyheigue parish.
- Don O'Neill, fashion designer.

== See also ==
- List of towns and villages in Ireland
