= Crosby (peach cultivar) =

Variety of peach

Prunus persica 'Crosby'
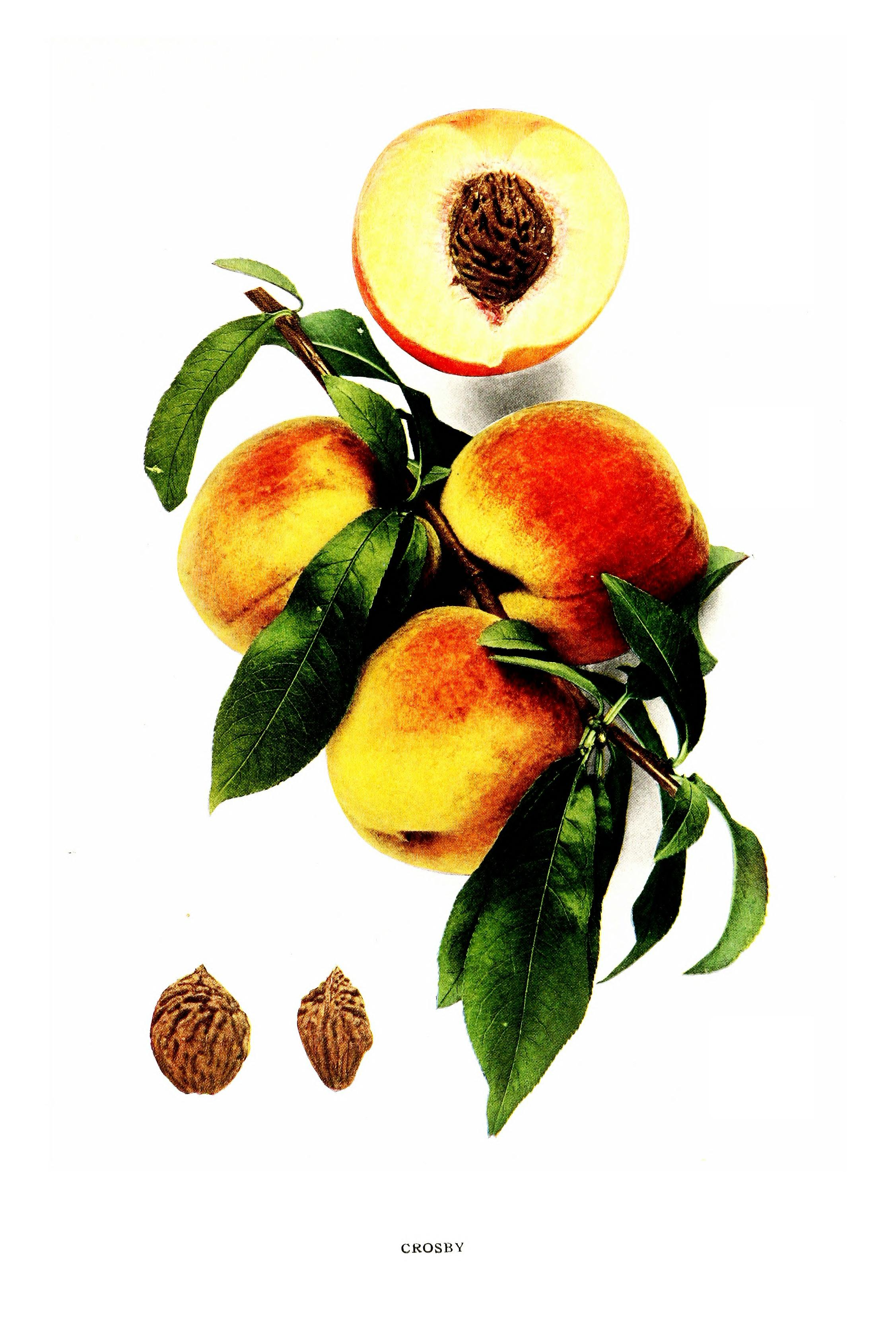
- 'Crosby' cultivar in The Peaches of New York, 1917
- Species: Prunus persica
- Cultivar: 'Crosby'
- Origin: United States (particularly in the northeastern and mid-Atlantic regions)

'Crosby' is a cultivar of the peach (Prunus persica). While not as widely discussed in modern popular culture as some other varieties, it holds historical significance in peach cultivation, particularly for its hardiness and late-season ripening.

'Crosby' peaches are hardy in USDA hardiness zones 5–9, indicating their ability to withstand winter temperatures down to −20 °F (−29 °C).

== History and origin ==
The origin of the 'Crosby' peach is not extensively documented. However, historical horticultural texts, such as "The Peaches of New York" published in 1917, do mention the 'Crosby' peach. This suggests it was a recognized and cultivated variety by the early 20th century in the United States, particularly in regions like New York, where extensive peach cultivation was undertaken. It appears to be a variety known for its suitability in certain growing conditions, including its cold hardiness.

The name 'Crosby' was applied in honour of Mr Crosby, a nurseryman of Billerica, Massachusetts.

== Cultivation ==
'Crosby' requires between 600 and 1000 chill hours (based on other peach varieties in zones 5–9) during dormancy to properly set fruit. Its chill hour requirements have not been properly tested, however. Its late blooming habit makes it well-suited for regions where late frosts are a concern after chill hours have been met.

It bears at an early age and fruits abundantly.
