= David Crosbie =

David Crosbie may refer to:

- David Crosbie (Brookside), a character on the Channel 4 soap opera titled Brookside
- David Crosbie, prisoner on the St. Michael of Scarborough

== See also ==
- David Crosby (disambiguation)
