= Hannah Crosbie =

Scottish wine critic

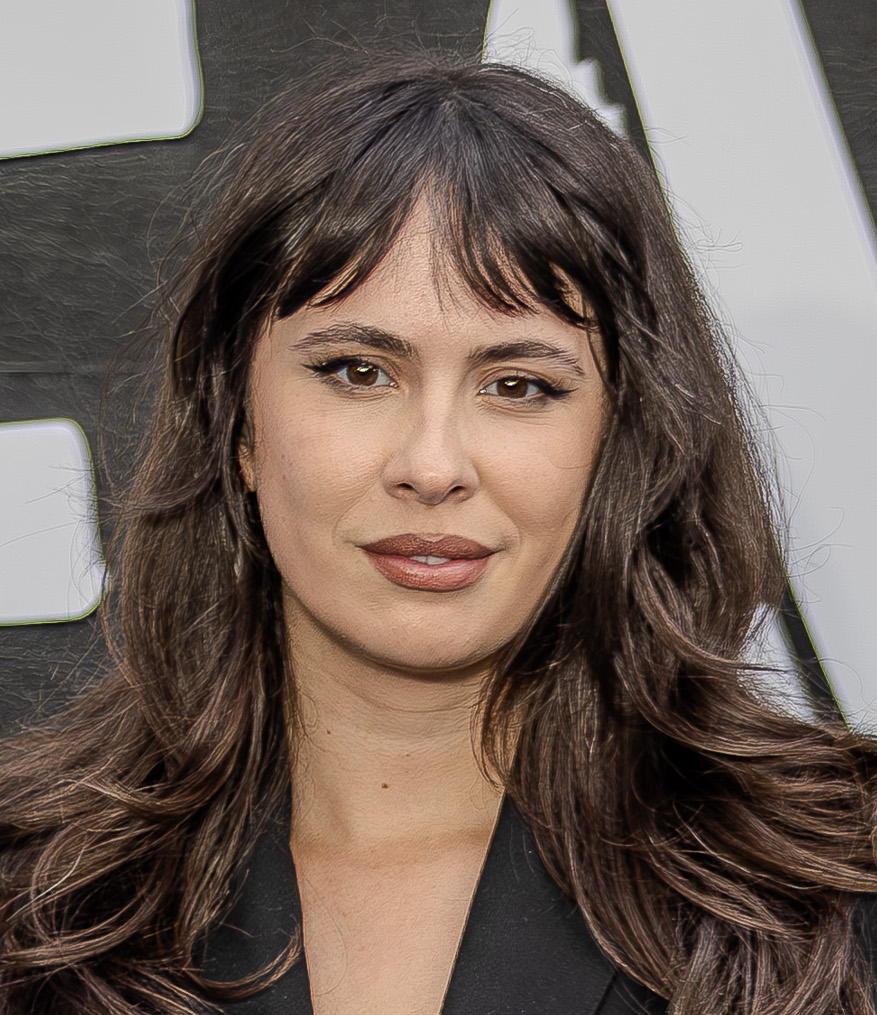
- Crosbie in 2025
- Born: 1997 (age 28–29)
- Years active: 2020–present
- Website: www.hannahcrosbie.com

Hannah Crosbie (born 1997) is a Scottish wine critic based in London. She founded Dalston Wine Club in 2020. She has since authored the book Corker: A Deeply Unserious Wine Book (2024) and had columns in The Guardian and The Observer. She also appears in the Channel 4 programme Sunday Brunch.

== Early life ==
Crosbie grew up in Edinburgh. She studied English at university.

== Career ==
In 2020, Crosbie founded Dalston Wine Club and started building an online following through her affordable wine recommendations. She started the podcast Acquired Tastes in 2021, hosted the first Berry Bros. & Rudd podcast Drinking Well in 2022, and co-hosted I'll Have What She's Having with chef Sophie Wyburd in 2023. Mob named I'll Have What She's Having one of the best food podcasts in 2023.

Crosbie made her television debut in 2022 with recurring appearances in the Channel 4 series Sunday Brunch. In 2023, Ebury Press acquired the rights to publish Crosbie's debut guide book Corker: A Deeply Unserious Wine Book in 2024. Crosbie joined The Guardian and The Observer in 2024 and 2025 respectively.

== Bibliography ==
- Corker: A Deeply Unserious Wine Book (2024)

== Accolades ==
- 2023 International Wine and Spirit Competition (IWSC): Emerging Talent in Wine Communication – shortlisted
- 2024 CODE Hospitality Women of the Year: Innovator – won
