= Crosby, North Yorkshire =

Village and civil parish in North Yorkshire, England

Coordinates: 54.313°N 1.372°W

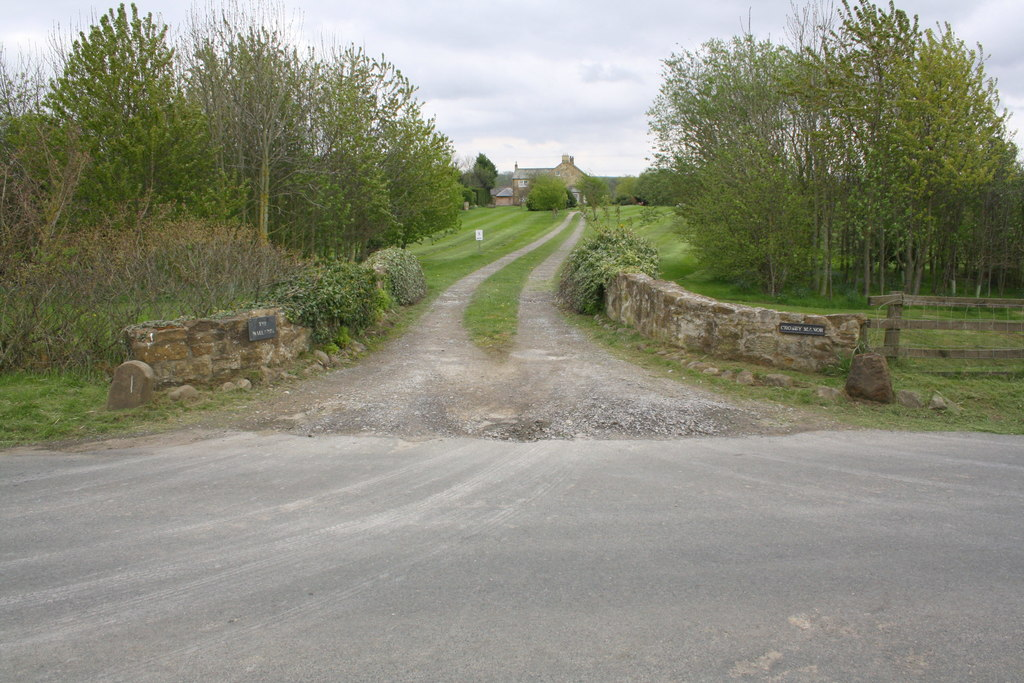
Entrance to Crosby Manor

Crosby is a village and civil parish in the county of North Yorkshire, England. The population of the parish was estimated at 20 in 2010. The population remained at less than 100 at the 2011 Census. Details are included in the civil parish of Thornton-le-Beans.

From 1974 to 2023 it was part of the Hambleton District. It is now administered by the unitary North Yorkshire Council. Its immediate neighbour is the parish of Borrowby.

== See also ==
- Listed buildings in Crosby, North Yorkshire
