= Paul P. Crosbie =

United States Communist Party politician

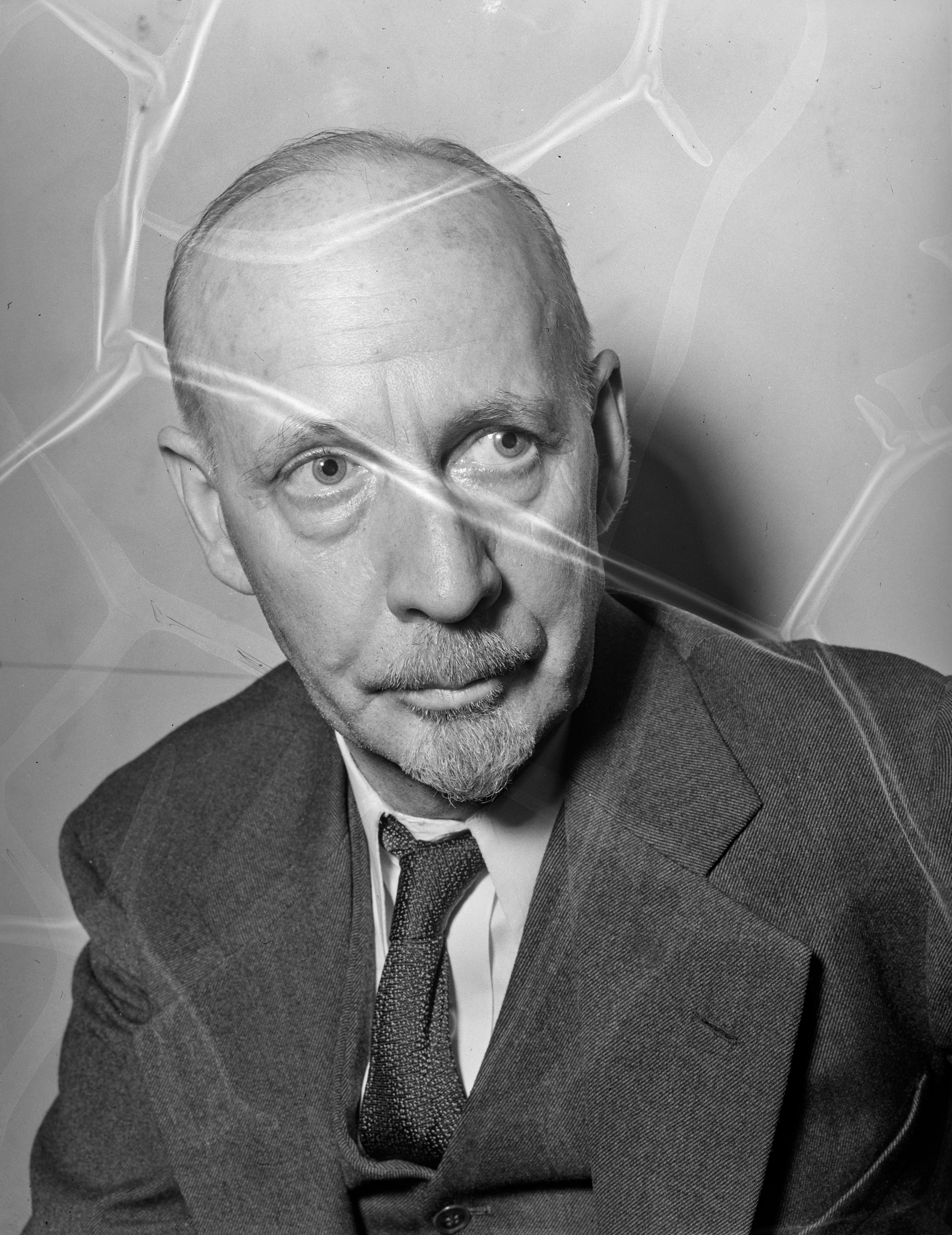
Crosbie c. 1937

Paul Pembroke Crosbie (February 27, 1881 – July 30, 1949) was an American Communist Party official.

== Biography ==
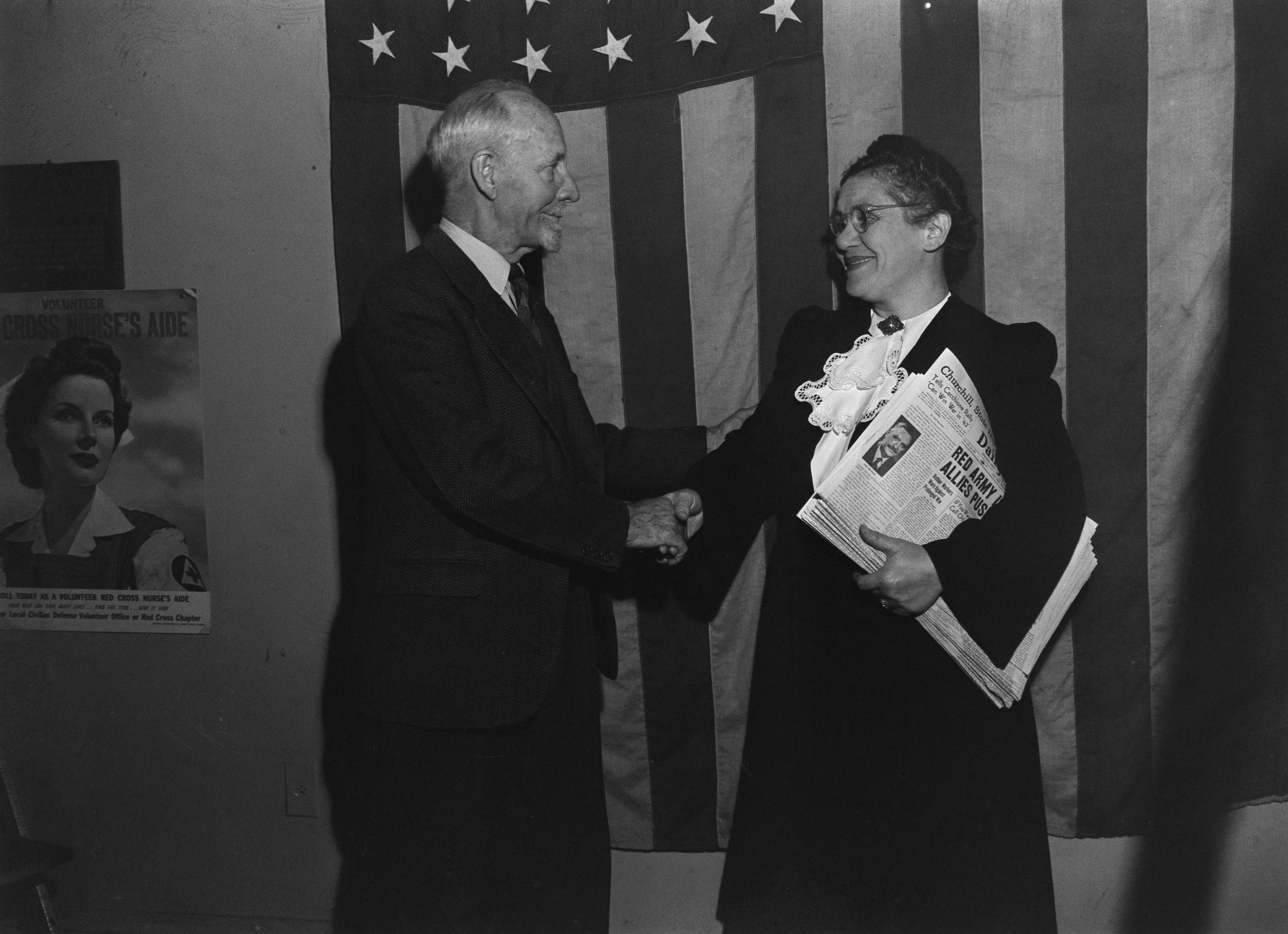
Crosbie shakes hands with Mildred Schwab, congratulating her for selling fifty copies of the Daily Worker in a single day, September 27, 1943

Crosbie was educated at Lake Forest Academy and Harvard University, where he was a classmate of Franklin D. Roosevelt. Crosbie joined the military and was promoted to the rank of second lieutenant in August 1917. During the First World War, Crosbie fought in the Field Artillery at the Battle of Saint-Mihiel.

Crosbie began his political career as a Democrat. While serving as a captain of the Democratic Party in Queens, Crosbie resigned in protest of a Party executive's refusal to resign from a personal real estate business. In 1934, while working as an insurance agent in Manhattan, Crosbie joined the Communist Party. He stated that he decided to join the Party because of his opposition to Roosevelt's agricultural policy. Crosbie's membership in the American Legion was challenged in 1934 by another Legion member because of his Communist Party affiliation but a trial board upheld his membership. Crosbie was finally forced out of the American Legion in 1941, ostensibly for non-payment of dues, although Crosbie argued that he had paid.

Crosbie ran several unsuccessful campaigns as the Communist Party's nominee for New York City Council from the Queens district between 1937 and 1943. In October 1939, the Court of Appeals banned Crosbie from appearing on the ballot as a Communist Party candidate for New York City Councilman, along with Israel Amter, Isidore Begun, and Peter Cacchione, though this was later reversed.
