= Sir Edward Crosbie, 5th Baronet =

5th Baronet of Nova Scotia

Personal details
- Born: c. 1755 County Wicklow
- Died: 5 June 1798 Carlow, Ireland
- Cause of death: Execution by hanging and decapitation
- Spouse: Castiliana Westenra
- Children: Hester Crosbie, William Crosbie, Edward Crosbie
- Parent(s): Sir Paul Crosbie, 4th Baronet and Mary Daniel
- Relatives: Richard Crosbie (brother)
- Education: Trinity College Dublin
- Occupation: In 1778, Sir Edward was called to the bar

Sir Edward Crosbie, 5th Baronet (c. 1755 – 5 June 1798) was a Protestant gentleman executed in Carlow, Ireland, for alleged complicity in the United Irish Rebellion in May 1798. He was accused by the Crown authorities of being in command of the rebels and of addressing them from the steps of his house prior to their attack upon the barracks in Carlow. His innocence was protested by family and neighbours.

== Early life and education ==
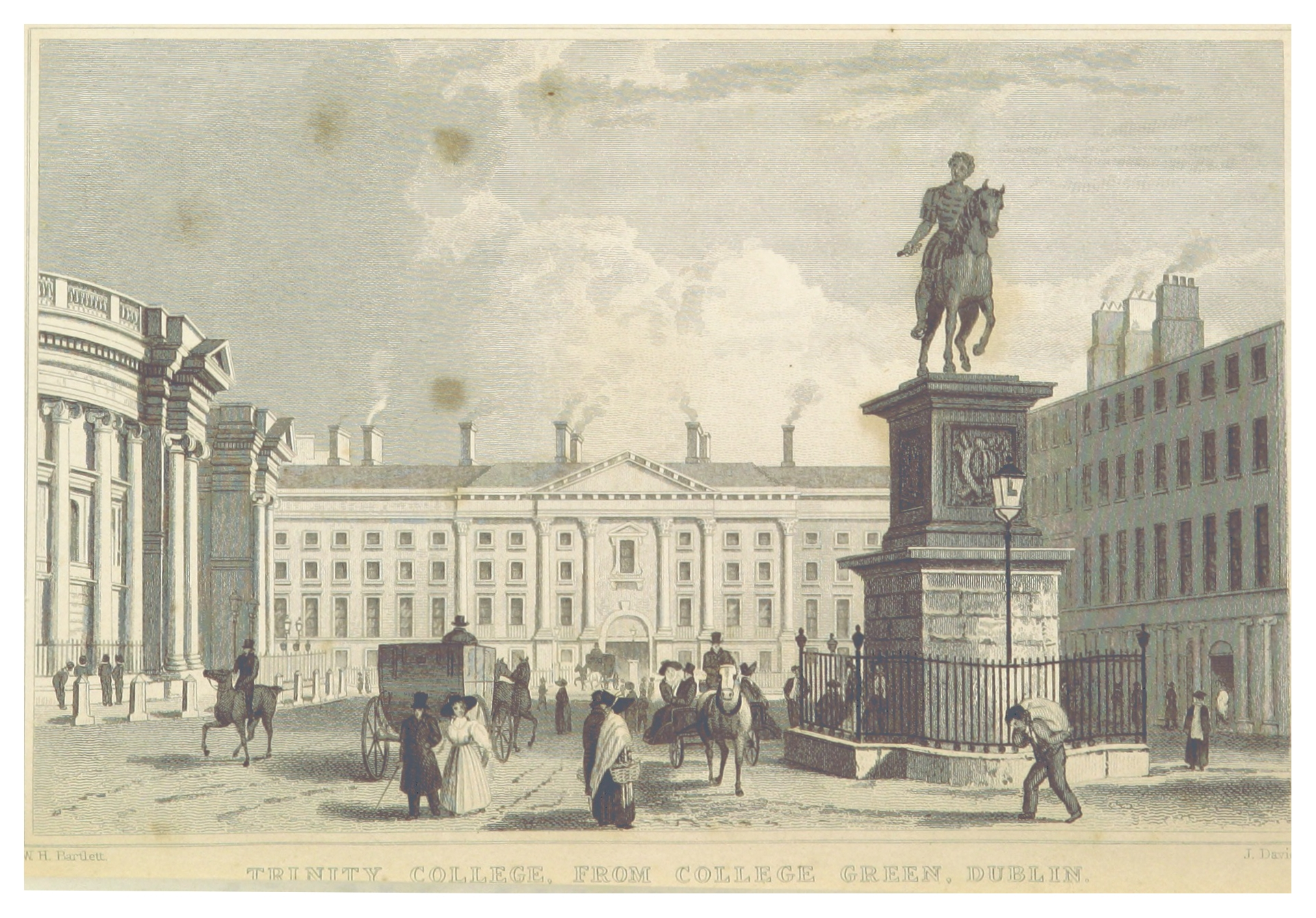
Trinity College, Dublin, Main Entrance (1837)

Crosbie was born in County Wicklow, likely at Crosbie Park, near Baltinglass. His father was Sir Paul Crosbie, 4th Baronet, and his mother was Mary, whose father was Edward Daniel of Cheshire. Crosbie lived at Crosbie Park until 1770, when at the age of 15 he went on to Trinity College, Dublin as a fellow commoner. In 1773, at the age of 18, he succeeded to his father's baronetcy, as the 5th Baronet Crosbie of Maryborough in Queen's County. The following year he took his Bachelor of Arts. On 21 April 1774, Crosbie received a pension "during the King's pleasure" of £150 per annum. His younger brother Richard, Ireland's first balloonist, received £50. In 1778, Crosbie was called to the bar.

Sir Edward was reputedly of an independent nature well regarded by his tenantry. A contemporary, William Farrell, recalled him as a man who "did not approve of making the poor man and his little offspring wretched ... [and who] seldom associated with those in power". Nonetheless, on 30 May 1798 he was arrested on the charge of treason and executed (hung and decapitated) just six days later in what has been widely regarded as a miscarriage of justice.

== Trial and execution ==
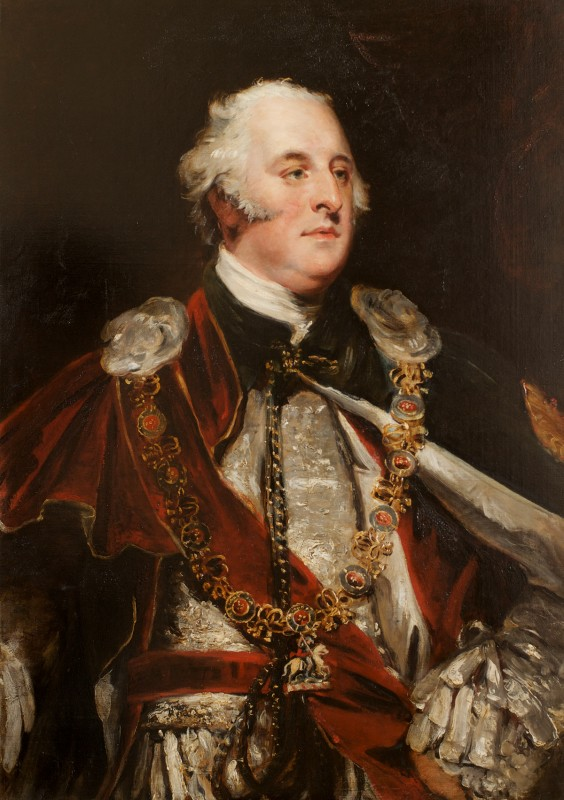
Lord Camden c.1825, head of the government in Ireland in early 1798: he came under increasing pressure from members of the Irish Parliament to arrest the United Irish leadership. Sir Edward Crosbie was the first to be hanged.

In a letter from the Rev. Robert Robinson to Mrs. Boissier, dated Tullow, 30 Jan. 1799, Robinson wrote:

I knew Sir Edward's political sentiments well, and do solemnly declare, that he never, to my recollection, uttered a word of treasonable tendency; and with me he was ever unreserved.

Crosbie was nevertheless accused of supporting the United Irishmen, on account of the seditious behaviour of his servants, Thomas Myler, and John Finn, who had joined the rebellious movement. These men knew full well that treason was being planned in the form of an attack on the city of Carlow. Fearing the danger of retaliation being taken against him and his family, if he opposed them, Crosbie decided to turn a blind eye. Myler compounded these problems by addressing an assembled crowd of revolutionaries from the private home of Crosbie and his family.

Turtle Bunbury states that "on 24th May 1798, the Viewmount estate was the chosen location for over a thousand United Irishmen from across Leinster to meet in advance of the next days attack on Carlow Town. The attack was an unmitigated disaster, leaving a large number of rebels dead." J.J. Woods explains that the authorities assumed that the meeting had been orchestrated by Crosbie, who was "accused ... of being in command of the rebels and of addressing them from the steps of the house prior to their departure for the town".

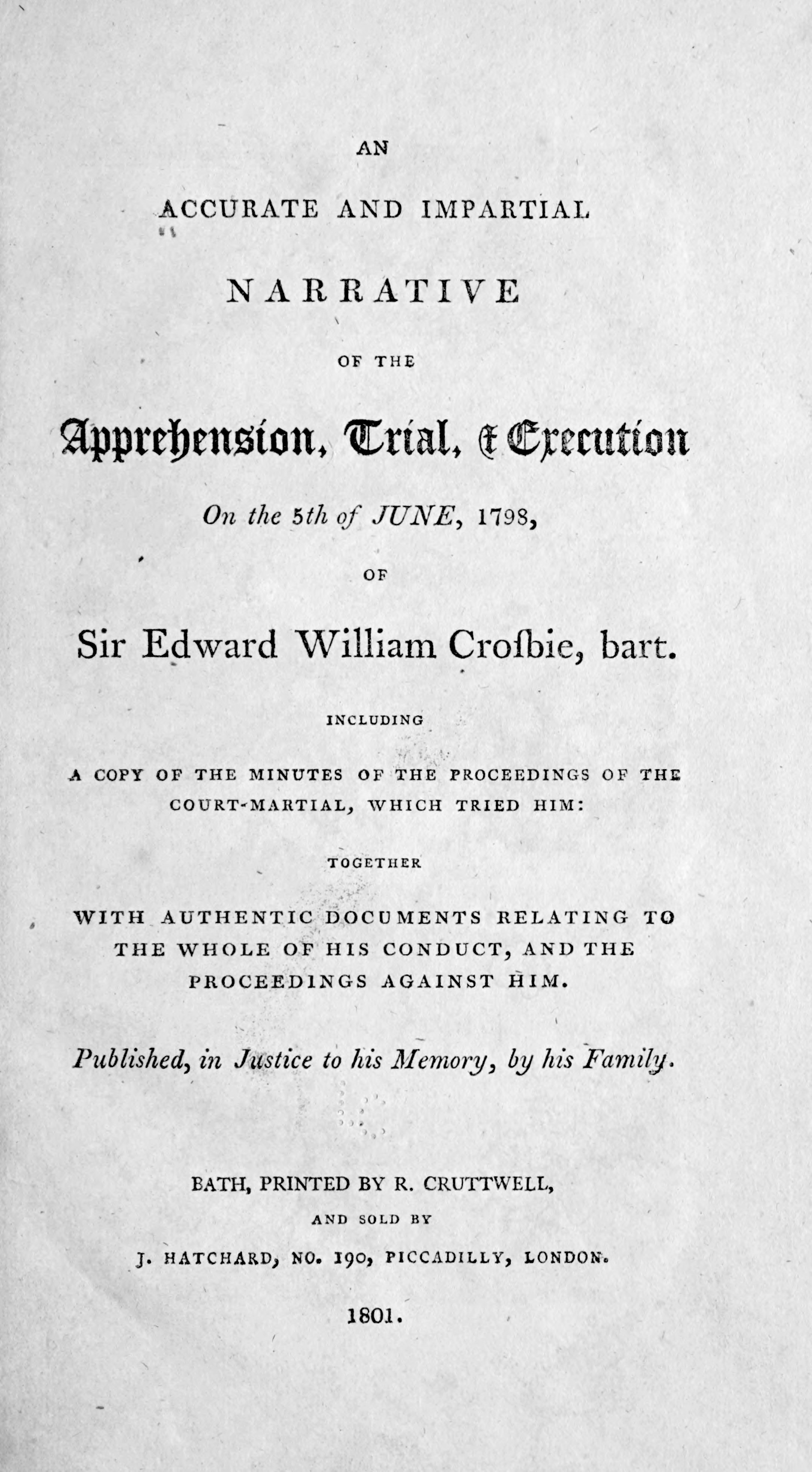
An Accurate and Impartial Narrative of the Apprehension, Trial & Execution, on the 5th of June 1798 of Sir Edward William Crosbie, Bart.

As stated by Turtle Bunbury, "in the aftermath of the massacre, all United Irishmen suspects were rounded up. Amongst these was Sir Edward Crosbie who appears to have been framed by one of the Burtons who held a grudge against him over a duel fought some weeks earlier".

On 30 May Viewmount was searched, and it was found that Myler had already fled. Colonel Mahon of the Ninth Dragoons arrested Crosbie and placed him in Carlow Jail. His trial was arranged to take place three days later, leaving no time for a defence to be put in place. Lady Crosbie only received an hour's notice of the event.

Turtle Bunbury explains that "Sir Edward was tried before a military court, hanged and beheaded. The illegality of his murder was still a source of heated debate in Westminster thirty years later."

In 1802 Crosbie's family and friends published their findings, once having finally obtained a copy of the minutes of the court-martial, and had completed their investigations. Every obstacle and obfuscation had been placed in their path in order to establish the truth. J.J. Woods gives a full account of the lengths the family went to, in order to privately publish their evidence of Crosbie's innocence. They entitled this: An Accurate and Impartial Narrative of the Apprehension, Trial & Execution, on the 5th of June, 1798 of Sir Edward William Crosbie, Bart.

== False evidence submitted ==
In preparing their evidence of Crosbie's innocence, members of his family and friends wrote a footnote, stating:

Amongft the numerous reports of this nature we cannot forbear to mention the following: ─ That Sir Edward Crosbie, during the interval between his trial and execution, wrote a letter to Sir Charles Asgill, in which he acknowledged the justice of the sentence, and only requested that the mode of execution might be varied. We have been assured that some persons of character have been shown the letter, which was said to have been written by Sir Edward. The family could not for a moment give credit to the report, but wished to have it in their power to confute it. Accordingly the Rev. Mr. Douglas, nephew to Sir Edward Crosbie, and Counsellor Powell, waited on Sir Charles Asgill, who assured them that he had never received a letter of any kind from Sir Edward Crosbie. This fable we have endeavoured to trace out, and have very good grounds for asserting, that it originated with one of the members of the Court-Martial. How desperate the cause must be, which has recourse to such falsehoods, the reader will judge!

== Miscarriage of justice ==
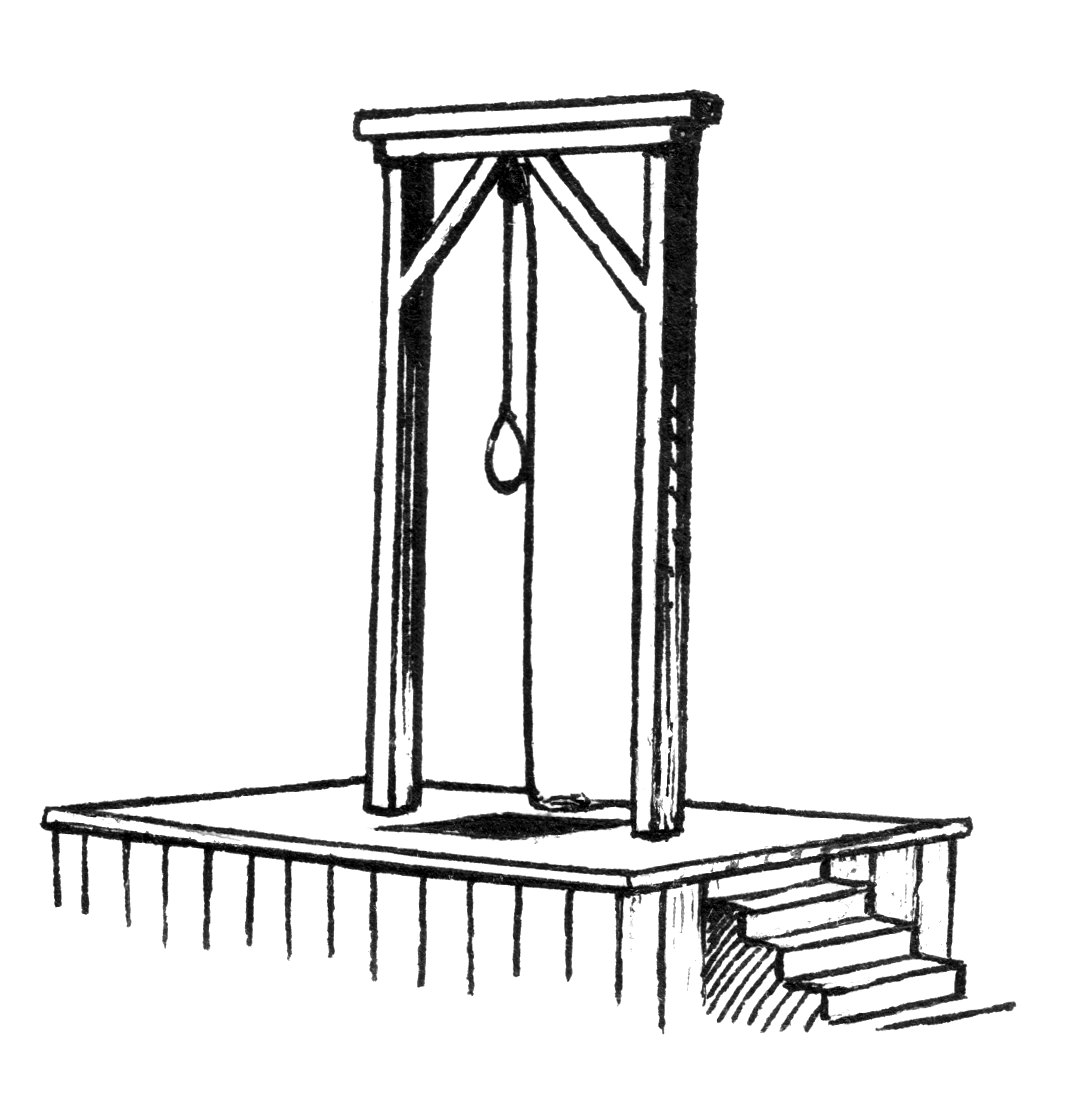
Sir Edward Crosbie was hanged before being decapitated. George Powell, Counsellor-at-Law, wrote: "Oh, Sir, to have seen him die would have been sufficient to have convinced any person that he had lived a man of honour."

The court-martial proceedings have been recorded by J.J. Woods: and at the conclusion of his trial, Crosbie stated:

I most solemnly declare, in the presence of Almighty God, that I am not, nor ever have been, a Member of the Society of United-Irishmen

J.J. Woods continues: "By way of conclusion, therefore, we shall now sum up in one view the several particulars, which we consider to have been clearly substantiated in the preceding pages, relative to the harsh and injurious treatment Sir Edward Crosbie experienced with regard to his trial and the execution of the dreadful sentence consequent upon it, from which the impartial Reader will have seen —

That Sir Edward William Crosbie was brought to his trial, without being previously informed of the charges that were laid against him.

That many of his friends who might have been useful to him in preparing for his defence were not admitted to him.

That in consequence of this circumstance, and the unexpected precipitancy of his trial, contrary to the express engagement of the commanding officer Colonel Mahon, Sir Edward was destitute of proper counsel.

That the court-martial which tried him, was illegally constituted; no judge advocate, or a competent deputy, being present at it.

That the witnesses produced and admitted against Sir Edward were of the most objectionable character; and that none but of this description could be found or did appear.

That the means that were used to extort evidence against the prisoner, were such as rendered the evidence itself perfectly inadmissible.

That unimpeachable witnesses in Sir Edward's favour were not permitted to enter the court.

That neither of the charges on which the prisoner was tried were proved against him; and that there appeared not the smallest grounds by which to justify the sentence that was pronounced.

That the execution of the sentence was precipitate, at an unusual hour, and attended with atrocious circumstances, not warranted by the sentence, and reflecting the greatest disgrace on the parties concerned in them; and finally,

That, in defiance of an Act of Parliament, a copy of the Proceedings has been withheld from the widow and family."

As Sister Maura noted, an indication that doubt was early felt in official circles as to Crosbie's guilt was that the pension which the family held (at the pleasure of the Crown) continued to be paid and he was never publicly attainted.

== Death and burial ==
According to J.J. Woods, after his sentence had been carried out, Crosbie was denied a Christian burial. "This horrid spectacle [his severed head erected in view of his home, where his widow and children were unable to avoid witnessing it] remained indeed but a short time; ..." When the head was removed from its spike, his widow had to bury the separate parts of his body in her garden at View-Mount until, eventually, and "not without considerable opposition, ... the body was removed by a worthy and respectable clergyman of the Church of England to a neighbouring church-yard, that it might receive the rites of Christian burial in consecrated ground".

== "The Last Word and the Final Proof" ==
Victor Hadden reports that "years afterwards when he [Thomas Myler] was no longer in danger and when Sir Edward was only a memory, he was cross-examined and after over a century has passed his statement is now on record for all to read. Here is the evidence of Thomas Myler, steward to Sir Edward Crosbie, as given to William Farrell who wrote it down in his clear and honest hand":─

Sir Edward Crosbie was never an United Irishman. No person dare propose such a thing to him and if the United Irishmen happened to be mentioned in ordinary conversation he would remark: 'Ah, they are foolish people; I pity them; they do not know what they are doing.' And that was as much as any gentleman could say at the time with safety to himself. But as respects the night of the insurrection, it was a rule with Sir Edward, when the business of the day was over, to go to his study and when he once went in we saw no more of him till next morning and he knew no more of what was doing in the house or about it during that time than a man twenty miles off.

On the unfortunate night in question, he was as usual in his study and the people of the neighbourhood assembled and came to me as I had some arms concealed in the garden which they wanted. I begged and entreated them and used every argument in my power to cause them to desist, but all in vain and at last they threatened to break open the garden door and take them by force if I did not give them. When I found this I was obliged to open the door and give them and I then went from them and went up the steps of the hall-door and stood there as was sworn. And to make the matter more unfortunate to Sir Edward, I happened to wear a coat that night that he had bestowed me some time before and in which dress I might easily have been mistaken for him, so that the kindness of my good master to me was partly the cause of his ruin and he lost his life for what he had no hand, act or part in.

== See also ==
- Rev. John Crosbie
- Battle of Carlow

== Sources ==
- Crosbj (Crosbie) Family History dating back to 1050
- An Historical Review Of The State Of Ireland (Volume 2) By Francis Plowden

Baronetage of Ireland
Preceded by Paul Crosbie	Baronet (of Maryborough in Queen's County); 1773 – 1798	Succeeded by William Crosbie
