= Crosby, Washington =

Unincorporated community in Washington, US

- Unincorporated community
- Location in Washington and the United States Crosby (the United States)
- Coordinates: 47°34′55″N 122°51′58″W
- Country: United States
- State: Washington
- County: Kitsap
- Elevation: 453 ft (138 m)
- Time zone: UTC-8 (Pacific (PST))
  - Summer (DST): UTC-7 (PDT)
- GNIS feature ID: 1518342

Crosby is an unincorporated community in Kitsap County, in the U.S. state of Washington.

== History ==
A post office called Crosby was in operation between 1891 and 1918. The community's name is a transfer from Crosby, England.
