= Richard Crosbie =

First Irishman to make a manned flight

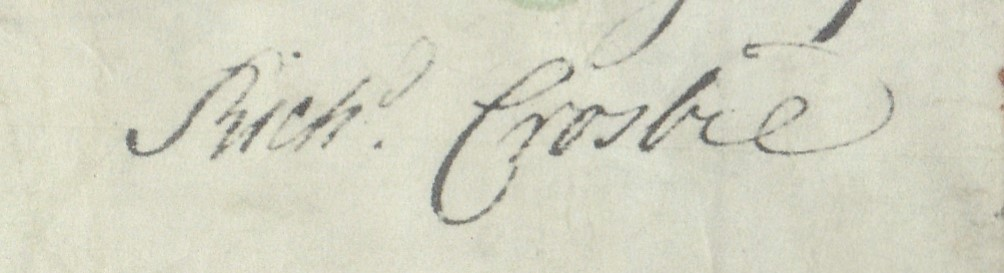
Crosbie's signature, 1788

Richard Crosbie (1755–1824) was the first Irishman to make a manned flight. He flew in a hydrogen air balloon from Ranelagh, on Dublin's southside to Clontarf, on Dublin's northside on 19 January 1785 at the age of 30. His aerial achievement occurred just 14 months after the first-ever manned balloon flight by the Montgolfier Brothers in France and is commemorated by a memorial located at the site of this historic event and commissioned by Dublin City Council.

Crosbie, who was six feet three inches, was from Crosbie Park, near Baltinglass, County Wicklow. He studied at Trinity College Dublin and was part of a group of violent young men who raided brothels, on one occasion causing death, see Peg Plunkett entry on wikipedia. In December 1780, he married Charlotte Armstrong, daughter of Archibald Armstrong, with whom he had two children, Edward and Mary. Edward went on to become an army officer and Mary a novelist. Richard's brother, Sir Edward Crosbie, was executed for treason as a United Irishman on 5 June 1798.

Crosbie launched several balloons containing animals before attempting the first human flight on Irish soil. One balloon, containing a cat, was seen passing over the west coast of Scotland, before descending near the Isle of Man. The cat and the balloon were both rescued by a passing ship.

== Balloon flight ==
On 19 January 1785 at 2.30 pm, Crosbie launched, from an exhibition area at Ranelagh Gardens, his Grand Air Balloon and Flying Barge in which he intended to cross the Irish Sea.

Late in 1784, Crosbie exhibited his "Aeronautic Chariot" at an exhibition at Ranelagh Gardens in Dublin. Made of wood covered with cloth, designed and built by himself, the Chariot resembled a boat, with rudder and sails, intended to enable navigation in the air, reducing reliance on wind direction. His first flight took place on 19 January 1785 at Ranelagh, witnessed by more than 35,000 people. The balloon and chariot were beautifully painted with the arms of Ireland supported by Minerva and Mercury, and with emblematic figures of the wind. Crosbie's aerial dress "consisted of a robe of oiled silk, lined with white fur, his waistcoat and breeches in one, of white satin quilted, and morocco boots, and a montero cap of leopard skin".

He intended to cross the Irish Sea, but as darkness fell early in the winter evenings, he decided to land at Clontarf. He attempted a channel crossing on 19 July 1785, (defying a ban on balloon flights by the Lord Mayor of Dublin because the population of the city was spending long periods gaping at the sky instead of working), but came down halfway across due to a severe storm, and was rescued by the Dun Laoghaire barge Captain Walmitt, which was following his progress.

== Property ==
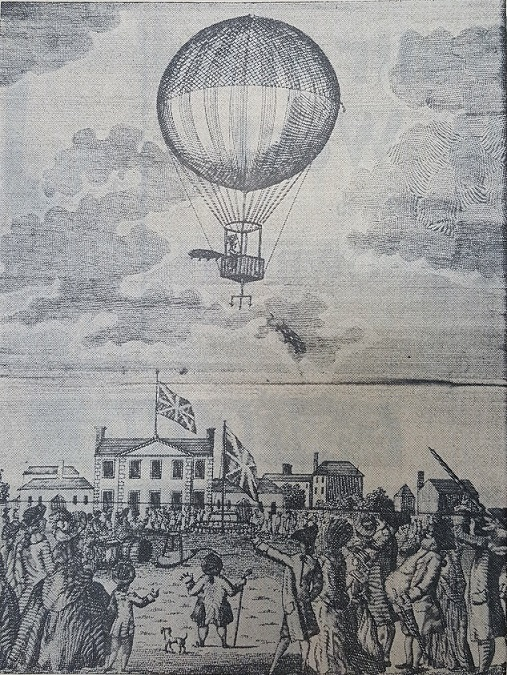
Engraving of Crosbie's flight to Limerick, on 27 April 1786

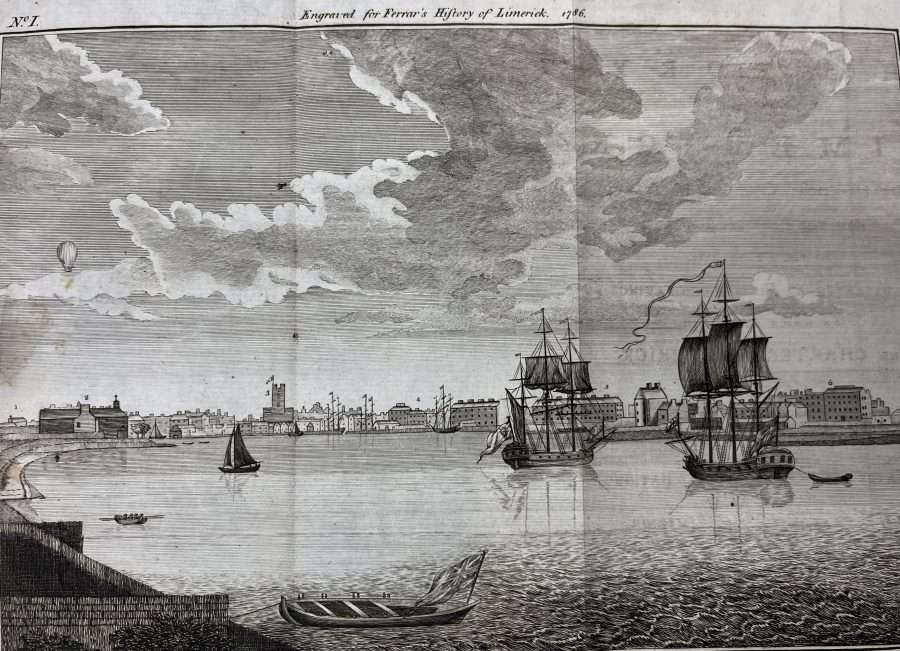
The balloon (far left) over Limerick

Just 20 days or so after his January 1785 ascent from Ranelagh, Crosbie signed a Deed taking over the remainder of a 900-year lease from his father-in-law Archibald Armstrong, of a property on the west side of Cumberland Street, Dublin (which Armstrong had been leasing from John Trotter, since late February 1781). The yearly rent was £30 (besides taxes) and it consisted of a house, coach house, stable, and other appurtenances. Just three years later, on 19 May 1788, Crosbie (described as 'Richard Crosbie formerly of the City of Dublin, now of Ballycumber in the Kings County, Esquire') assigned the house back to Archibald Armstrong for the remainder of the 900 years. The seat of the Armstrong family was Twickenham House just northwest of Ballycumber and it is possible that Crosbie and family were living there at the time.

The house on Cumberland Street was eventually reassigned back to Crosbie on 1 October 1790, including "several goods and articles of household furniture". It is not known why the house changed hands so often. At some point prior to May 1827, a fire broke out at Crosbie's home on Cumberland Street destroying a number of original deeds relating to the leases and documents concerning the house. Prior to his death in 1824, Crosbie had arranged that the house be put into the name of his daughter Mary, which came to pass in a Deed of Assignment dated 30 May 1827, with the "consent, approbation and acquiescence" of her brother Edward.

== Memorial statue ==
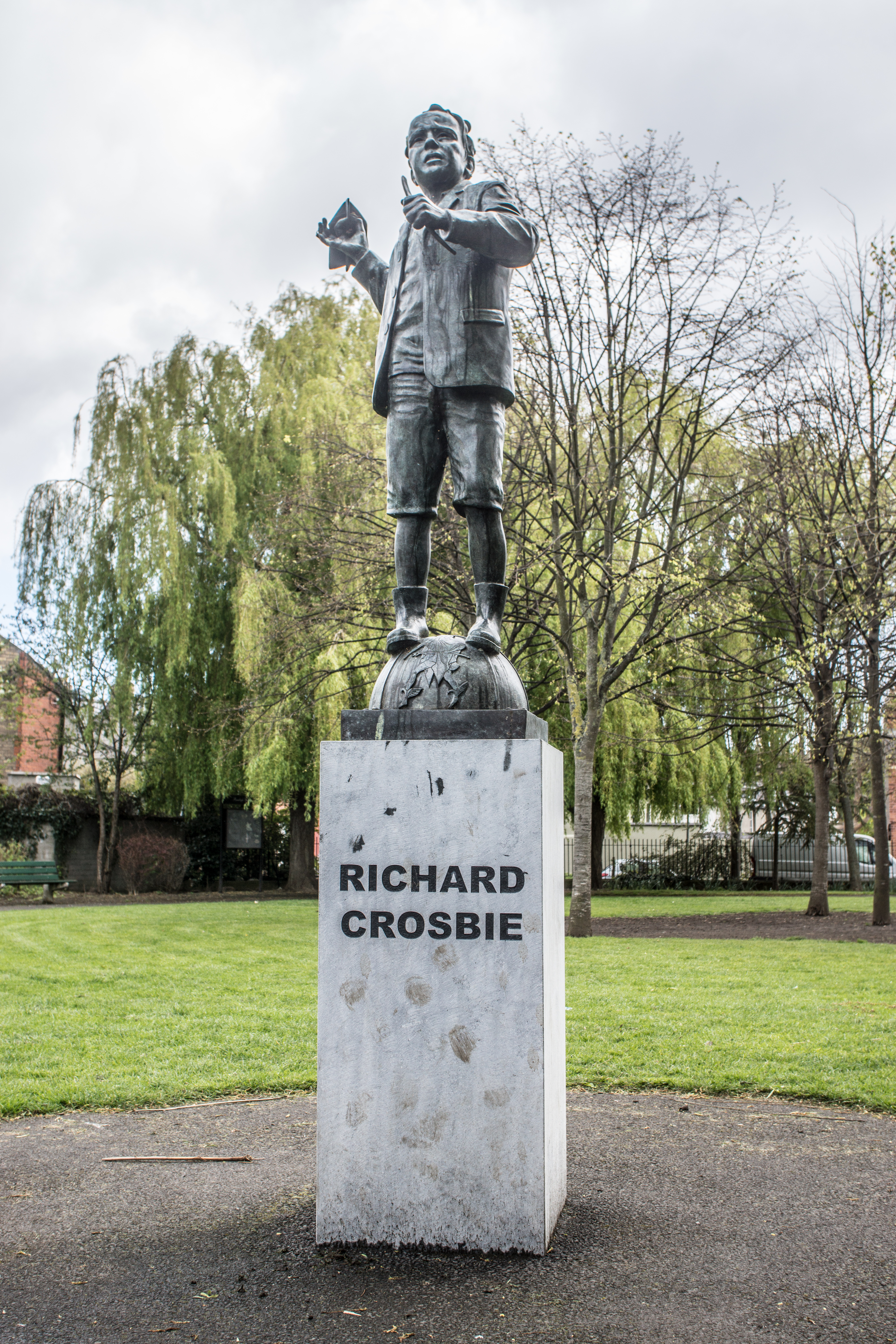
Crosbie statue in Ranelagh Gardens, Dublin

A memorial statue to commemorate the balloon flight, designed by Irish artist Rory Breslin, depicts Crosbie's youthful curiosity and many of the items displayed on the bronze reflect an airborne theme.

On Sunday, 28 September 2008 in Ranelagh Gardens, in conjunction with the Ranelagh Arts Festival, Councillor Mary Freehill (deputising on behalf of the Lord Mayor) unveiled a sculpture to commemorate "the first Irishman to fly".

Dublin City Council and the Department of the Environment, Heritage and Local Government's Per Cent for Art Scheme, funded the statue.

== See also ==
- Rev. John Crosbie
