= John Crosbie (bishop) =

John Crosbie, alias Sean Mac an Chrosáin, died September 1621, was a bishop of the Church of Ireland.

Crosbie was born a member of the Mac an Chrosáin family of Leinster, who were a bardic family to the Ui Mhórdha of Laois.

His baptismal name was Sean, and his mother was an O Cellaigh. His elder brother, Patrick Crosbie, had been active in English service since 1588 and helped transplant the septs of Laois into County Kerry. Patrick died on 22 March 1611; his son, the statesman Sir Piers Crosby, died November 1646.

Sean Mac an Chrosáin became anglicised and converted to Anglicanism. He changed his name to John Crosbie about 1583. In 1600 Queen Elizabeth I of England referred to him as a graduate in schools, of English race (sic), skilled in the English tongue and well disposed in religion. He held the office of Prebendary of Disert in the diocese of Limerick. He was appointed the Anglican Bishop of Ardfert and Aghadoe on 15 December 1601.

His wife was Winifred Ni Leathlobhair (Lalor); they had issue:

- Sir Walter Crosbie, 1st Baronet, died 4 August 1638
- David Crosbie (died 1658), died 1658, ancestor of the Earl of Glandore
- Sir John Crosbie, died 14 January 1639
- Patrick Crosbie, admitted to Gray's Inn on 7 May 1619
- William Crosbie, alive 1658.
- Richard Crosbie, admitted to Lincoln's Inn on 12 January 1622
- Winifred Crosbie, married Mr. MacElligot
- Una Crosbie, married Mr. Stephenson
- Joan Crosbie, married Mr. McGillycuddy
- Katherine Crosbie, married Mr. Gilliesaght
- Ellen Crosbie, married Mr. Gilliesaght

Many of his descendants lived in County Carlow and County Kerry. They included

- Maurice Crosbie, 1st Baron Brandon
- Sir Edward Crosbie

== See also ==
- Richard Crosbie
