= Bing Crosby's record labels after 1955 =

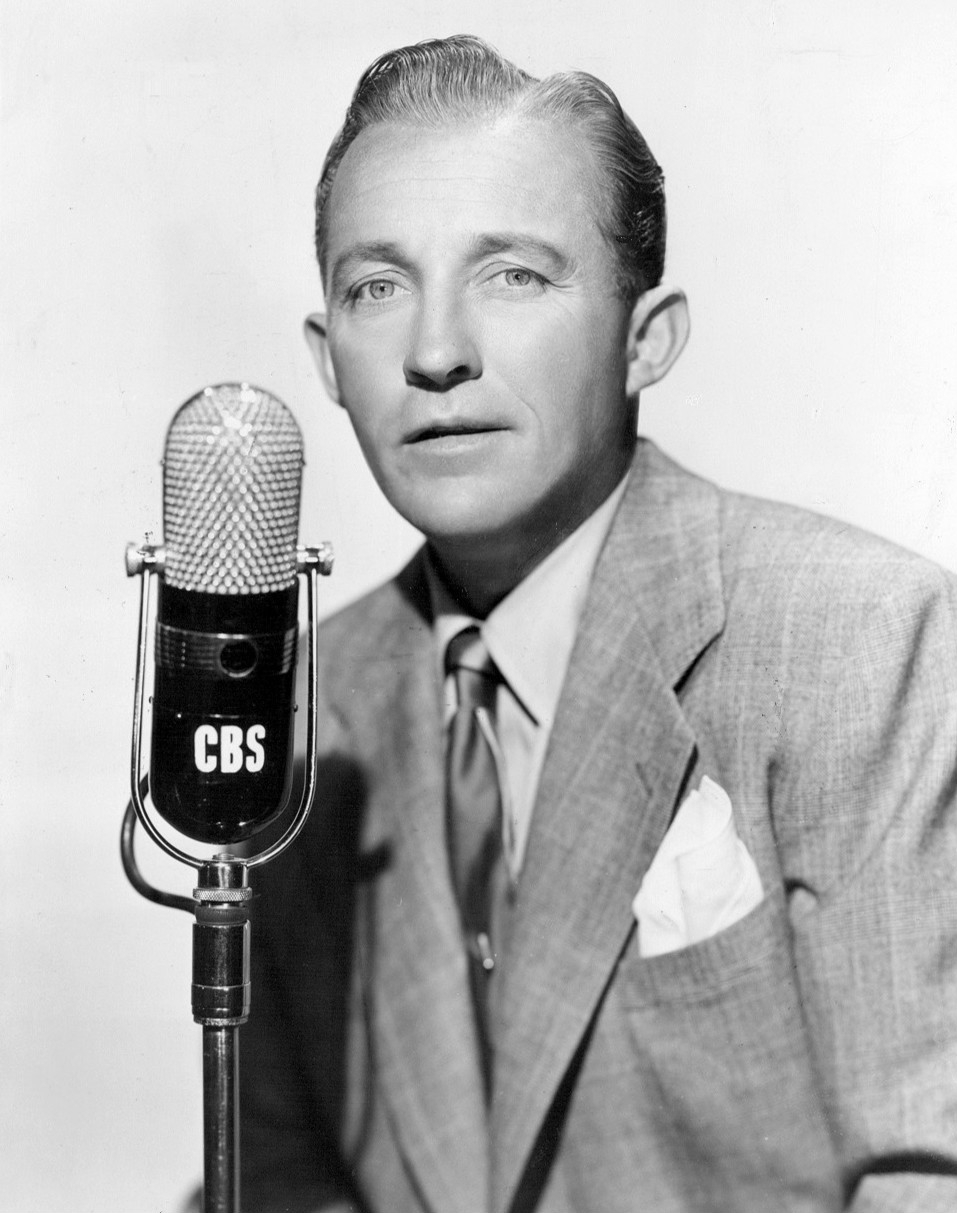
Bing Crosby, 1951

After Bing Crosby's long-term Decca Records contract was up, he signed many short-term contracts with a wide variety of labels. These included many popular labels such as Reprise, RCA, Verve, Decca (again), United Artists, Capitol and more.

== 1950s ==
=== 1956 ===
==== Capitol ====
- Bing recorded the MGM motion picture High Society soundtrack, along with Frank Sinatra, Grace Kelly, Celeste Holm and Louis Armstrong from early to late February.

==== Decca ====
Bing recorded the film scores for Anything Goes in late February. Bing then recorded Songs I Wish I Had Sung the First Time Around for Decca in mid to late April.

==== Verve ====
- Crosby recorded Bing Sings Whilst Bregman Swings on Verve in early June. This was a turning point in his career, because he was trying out an innovated version of his own style, with a swinging orchestra, much to the style of his famous musical successors Frank Sinatra, Dean Martin, and many more.

=== 1957 ===
==== RCA Victor ====
Bing recorded the Bing with a Beat LP in late February along with Bob Scobey's Frisco Jazz Band.

==== Golden Records ====
In April, Bing read the short stories: Jack B. Nimble – A Mother Goose Fantasy, A Christmas Story - An Axe, An Apple and a Buckskin Jacket, Ali Baba and the Forty Thieves and Never Be Afraid (which was a musical version of "The Emperor's New Clothes")

==== Decca ====
- Decca released some of his radio sessions in October on the album New Tricks.

=== 1958 ===
==== RCA Victor ====
In July and August, Bing and Rosemary Clooney recorded the album Fancy Meeting You Here.

=== 1959 ===
==== RCA Victor ====
In July 1959, Bing and Rosemary got together again for the album How the West Was Won. This was recorded for Bing Crosby's own company, Project Records, and was released by RCA Victor Records

==== Columbia Records ====
This soundtrack album Say One for Me was released by Columbia.

==== RCA Victor first, as LPM/LSP-2276 & Warner Bros. Records later, as W/WS 1363 ====
Join Bing and Sing Along was recorded in December 1959.

== 1960s ==
=== 1960 ===
==== MGM Records ====
The El Señor Bing album was recorded in June 1960 for Project Records and released by MGM Records.

Another album released by MGM was Bing & Satchmo recorded with Louis Armstrong in June 1960.

==== Warner Bros. Records ====
101 Gang Songs was recorded for Project Records and released by Warner Bros.

=== 1961 ===
==== Decca ====
Bing's album Holiday in Europe was recorded for Project Records and released by Decca.

==== RCA Victor ====
Bing's album Sing Along! With Bing Crosby And His Friends was released by RCA Victor.

=== 1962 ===
==== Liberty Records ====
The soundtrack album The Road to Hong Kong was issued by Liberty.

==== Warner Bros. Records ====
Another singalong type album On the Happy Side.

I Wish You a Merry Christmas. Bing sang Christmas favorites.

=== 1963 ===
==== Reprise Records ====
Contributed to the Reprise Musical Repertory Theatre albums.

Return to Paradise Islands. An album of Hawaiian themed songs.

==== Capitol ====
Bing Crosby Sings the Great Country Hits. Country and western songs.

=== 1964 ===
==== Reprise Records ====
America, I Hear You Singing. A a collection of patriotic songs that were recorded with Frank Sinatra.

Robin and the 7 Hoods. The score from the film of the same name.

12 Songs of Christmas. Christmas songs with Frank Sinatra and Fred Waring and the Pennsylvanians.

==== Capitol ====
That Travelin' Two-Beat was another album with Rosemary Clooney.

=== 1965 ===
==== The Longines Symphonette Society ====
Bing Crosby's Treasury - The Songs I Love. Twelve tracks recorded for a mail order firm.

=== 1968 ===
==== Pickwick Records ====
Thoroughly Modern Bing. Bing's first album for this label.

==== The Longines Symphonette Society ====
Bing Crosby's Treasury - The Songs I Love (1968 version). Another record set for Longines, this time with 36 Crosby vocals.

==== Amos Records ====
Hey Jude / Hey Bing!. An album of contemporary songs recorded with Jimmy Bowen.

=== 1969 ===
==== Disneyland Records ====
Goldilocks. The soundtrack from the TV film starring Bing Crosby and his family.

== 1970s ==
=== 1971 ===
==== Daybreak Records ====
A Time to Be Jolly. Christmas themed songs recorded for Sonny Burke's record company.

=== 1972 ===
Bing 'n' Basie. Another album for Daybreak Records with Count Basie.

=== 1975 ===
==== London Records ====
A Southern Memoir. Recorded by Bing Crosby at his own expense and leased to the English branch of Decca who issued it on Decca's London label.

Bingo Viejo. Another album recorded by Bing Crosby at his own expense and leased to Decca. He called this his 'Mexican' album.

==== United Artists Records ====
That's What Life Is All About. The first album for Ken Barnes.

A Couple of Song and Dance Men. Another one for Ken Barnes, this time with Fred Astaire.

==== Argo Records (UK) ====
Tom Sawyer. A reading by Bing Crosby of an abridged version of Mark Twain’s classic story The Adventures of Tom Sawyer spread over a 3-LP set.

=== 1976 ===
==== United Artists Records ====
At My Time of Life. Another Ken Barnes production. Mainly show tunes.

==== K-tel Records ====
Bing Crosby Live at the London Palladium. Live recording of the show put on by Bing Crosby, Rosemary Clooney, Kathryn Crosby and Ted Rogers at the London Palladium from June 21 to July 4, 1976. Produced by Ken Barnes.

==== Decca ====
Feels Good, Feels Right. Recorded with Alan Cohen in London.

==== United Artists Records ====
Beautiful Memories. Another Ken Barnes production.

=== 1977 ===
==== Polydor Records ====
Seasons. Bing's last album. Again produced by Ken Barnes.
