= The Bible Story of Christmas =

The Bible Story of Christmas Narrated by Bing Crosby
- 2017 CD cover

Studio album by Bing Crosby, The Bonaventure Choir
- Released: 1957
- Recorded: 1957
- Genre: Religious
- Length: 28 minutes
- Label: World Library Publications

Bing Crosby chronology
New Tricks (1957)	The Bible Story of Christmas Narrated by Bing Crosby (1957)	Never Be Afraid (1958)

The Bible Story of Christmas is a studio album in which Bing Crosby narrates the Christmas story from St. Luke, Chapter 2 with the Bonaventure Choir singing Christmas hymns which are interspersed with Crosby's narration.

This is not the same as the album "A Christmas Story."

== Background ==
Sometime in 1955, Omer Westendorf (founder of World Library of Sacred Music) wrote to several famous Catholics to find a narrator for a recording project. Among those names were Loretta Young, Bishop Fulton J. Sheen, Rocky Marciano, and Bing Crosby. Bishop Sheen replied that he was too busy, and there were no replies from Ms. Young and Mr. Marciano. Bing Crosby made inquiries about World Library of Sacred Music through the Los Angeles Chancery Office. He made no formal reply and just sent a tape of the narration. Bing made the recording on August 6, 1956, and sent it to Omer Westendorf in Cincinnati. Where the narration was recorded is unknown. The organ background was provided by Betty Zins Reiber, a longtime editor at WLP. According to Bing Enterprises/HLC Properties LLC, Bing donated his services and did not accept any payment.. The music on the album was arranged by Han Van Koert (1913–1976). The complete score of the album was published by WLP in 1958.

The recording of Bing Crosby reading the Gospel of Luke 2:4—20 has not been used in any other project and is exclusive to World Library Publications.

Not to be confused with "A Christmas Story - An Axe, An Apple and a Buckskin Jacket" (1957)

The original album, “The Bible Story of Christmas,” was released in December 1957 with a retail price of $4.98. A thousand copies were ordered and seven prints exist in the WLP Archive in Franklin Park, Illinois. The distribution was limited to Cincinnati, Ohio. The re-issue will be worldwide and available on vinyl and CD at wlpmusic.com.

Crosby's narration was broken up and interleaved with eight hymns sung by the Bonaventure Choir and the LP (number WLSM5) was duly produced by the World Library of Sacred Music and released in Cincinnati in December 1957 with a retail price of $4.98.

== Track listing ==
=== Original release ===
Side one
No.	Title	Writer(s)	Length
1.	"Behold a Virgin Bearing Him"	Michael V. Gannon	2:41
2.	"Silent Night"	Franz Xaver Gruber, Joseph Mohr	3:42
3.	"The First Nowell"	Traditional	2:39
4.	"A Child Is Born in Bethlehem"	Traditional	2:54

Side two
No.	Title	Writer(s)	Length
1.	"Angels We Have Heard on High"	James Chadwick	2:41
2.	"O Come, Little Children"	Johann Abraham Peter Schulz, Christoph von Schmid	3:19
3.	"Welcome, Son of Mary"	Traditional, Michael V. Gannon	3:44
4.	"O Come, All Ye Faithful"	John Francis Wade, Frederick Oakeley	3:48

== CD release ==
In 2017, WLP reissued the "lost" recording on CD to mark the 60th anniversary of the original issue. An extra track was added which contained Crosby's complete narration of Luke 2:4-20 which runs for 2 minutes 29 seconds. A vinyl re-release was also made.
