= Bugs Bower =

American songwriter and record producer (1922–2019)

- Born: Maurice Bower; July 16, 1922; Atlantic City, New Jersey, U.S.
- Died: September 28, 2019 (aged 97); Ponte Vedra Beach, Florida, U.S.
- Occupations: Songwriter, arranger
- Years active: 1960–2015
- Known for: "Itsy Bitsy Teenie Weenie Yellow Polkadot Bikini", "Caterina"
- Partner: Kathryn Stanley Podwall

Maurice Bower (July 16, 1922 – September 28, 2019), known professionally as Bugs Bower, was an American composer, music arranger, bandleader and record producer. He was awarded nine Gold Record Million Seller Awards and two Grammy Awards. Bower arranged and produced hundreds of recordings including, You're a Good Man, Charlie Brown, The Great Doctor Dolittle Songs, Oliver!, The Godfather, Shaft, Mame; and worked with artists such as Perry Como, The Beatles, Bing Crosby, Liza Minnelli, and Richard Burton.

== Life and career ==
Maurice "Bugs" Bower was born at Atlantic City Hospital in Atlantic City, New Jersey, and raised there, the son of a music arranger who wrote musical themes for the Miss America pageant from the 1930s to the 1960s. He graduated in 1940 from Atlantic City High School. Drafted on October 28, 1942, into the 89th Infantry Division, as a U.S. Army sergeant during World War II, Bower led an army dance band for the troops and on radio and the stage. He also received the nicknamed "Bugs" by his army buddies because he was "skinny, had a strong New Jersey accent ... and he was always moving around, always had a plan"; just like Bugs Bunny. After the war, he worked as a music publisher at the Brill Building in New York City. Bower attended the Juilliard School of Music on a GI Bill. During this time, Bower wrote several of his popular music books. He arranged for Doc Severinsen to Maynard Ferguson and hits for television such as "Nadia's Theme" for the television soap opera The Young and the Restless He also wrote, at the suggestion of trumpeter Charles Colin, his first in a series of successful instructional music method books, called Bop. As a teacher, one of Bower's students was composer Johnny Mandel.

Bower worked on several recordings with singer Perry Como, composing the 1962 song "Caterina". In 1960, he arranged and produced the hit "Itsy Bitsy Teenie Weenie Yellow Polkadot Bikini" for pop singer Brian Hyland. The single needed a side-B, so Bower quickly composed the song Don't Dilly Dally Sally with songwriter Earl Shuman. Bower once claimed that if you gave him five minutes, he could "come up with a tune." Merv Griffin once said of Bower: "He had perfect pitch and total recall." Steve Allen said: "He couldn’t read music, but he could sit at the piano and play any piece of music he heard." In the 1960s, Bower helped finance and arranged vocals for the band Kool & the Gang; which won him a gold record. He later went on to produce hit albums such as "Bugs Bowers Boys and Girls" version of You're a Good Man, Charlie Brown, Rudyard Kipling's Just So Stories with Captain Kangaroo, Cab Calloway '68, and The Best 101 Children's Songs. He received a Grammy for the album Everything You Always Wanted to Know About Home Computers with Steve Allen and Audrey Meadows in 1983., and another for his work on The Little Prince.

In 2012, Bower wrote the memoir, Nice Stories About Nice People, which told about his experiences working with musical artists from Bing Crosby to Kool & the Gang and actors from Steve Allen to Joe Pesci. He received a Doctorate of Music from Five Towns College in 1980.

Bower was married three times; but lived with his life partner Kathryn Stanley Podwall from 1980 until his death in 2019.

== Partial discography ==
- "Itsy Bitsy Teenie Weenie Yellow Polkadot Bikini" - Brian Hyland (1960)
- "Caterina" - Perry Como (1962)
- An Evening with Perry Como (1963)
- "Ne Sois Pas Si Bête" - France Gall (1963)
- "Goodies" - J. J. Johnson (1965)
- Oliver! - The Pickwick Chorus & Orchestra (1967)
- The Sound of Woodstock (1970)
- Thoroughly Modern Bing - Bing Crosby (1968)
- Born with a Smile - Bobby Rydell (1976)
- Erotic Aerobics - Pierre Raymonde (1986)

== Partial bibliography ==
- Bower, Bugs (1952). Complete Chords and Progressions for All Instruments: Book I, II. ASIN B01LZWUGCC.
- Bower, Bugs (1980). Bop Duets Complete: Vol I, II, III. ASIN B003YT2L10.
- Bower, Bugs (2002–2015). Play with a Pro Series (Various). ISBN 978-0825627392.
- Bower, Bugs (2006). Today's Way to Play (Various). ISBN 978-1617270406.
- Bower, Bugs (July 17, 2012). Nice Stories About Nice People. ISBN 9781477135280.

== Awards ==
- Paul Harris Fellow Award
- U.S. Holocaust Memorial Council Award
- Nassau County Veteran's Wall of Honor
- Grammy Award
- Gold Record Million Seller Award
