= New Tricks (disambiguation) =

New Tricks is a BBC television police drama series.

New Tricks may also refer to:

- New Tricks (album), a 1957 album by Bing Crosby and the Buddy Cole Trio
- New Tricks, compilation album of the best of the Bonzo Dog Doo-Dah Band
