= Lists of record labels =

Music-marketing brands promoting and distributing recording artists

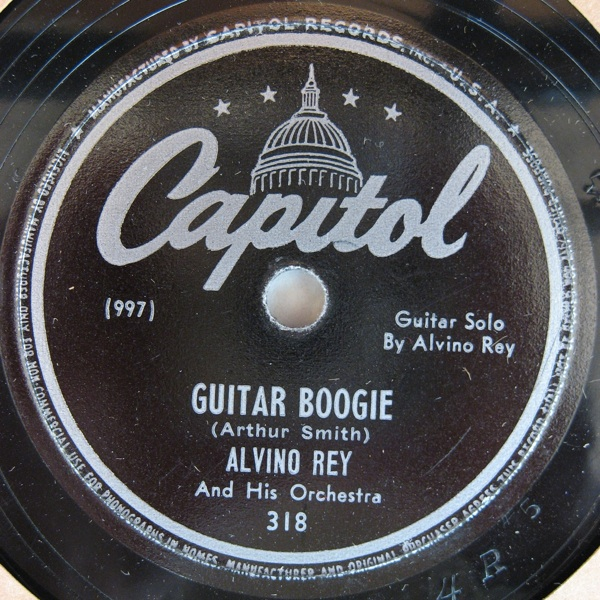

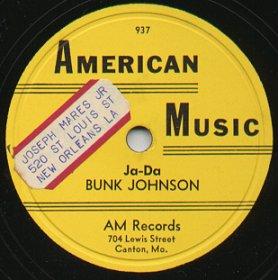

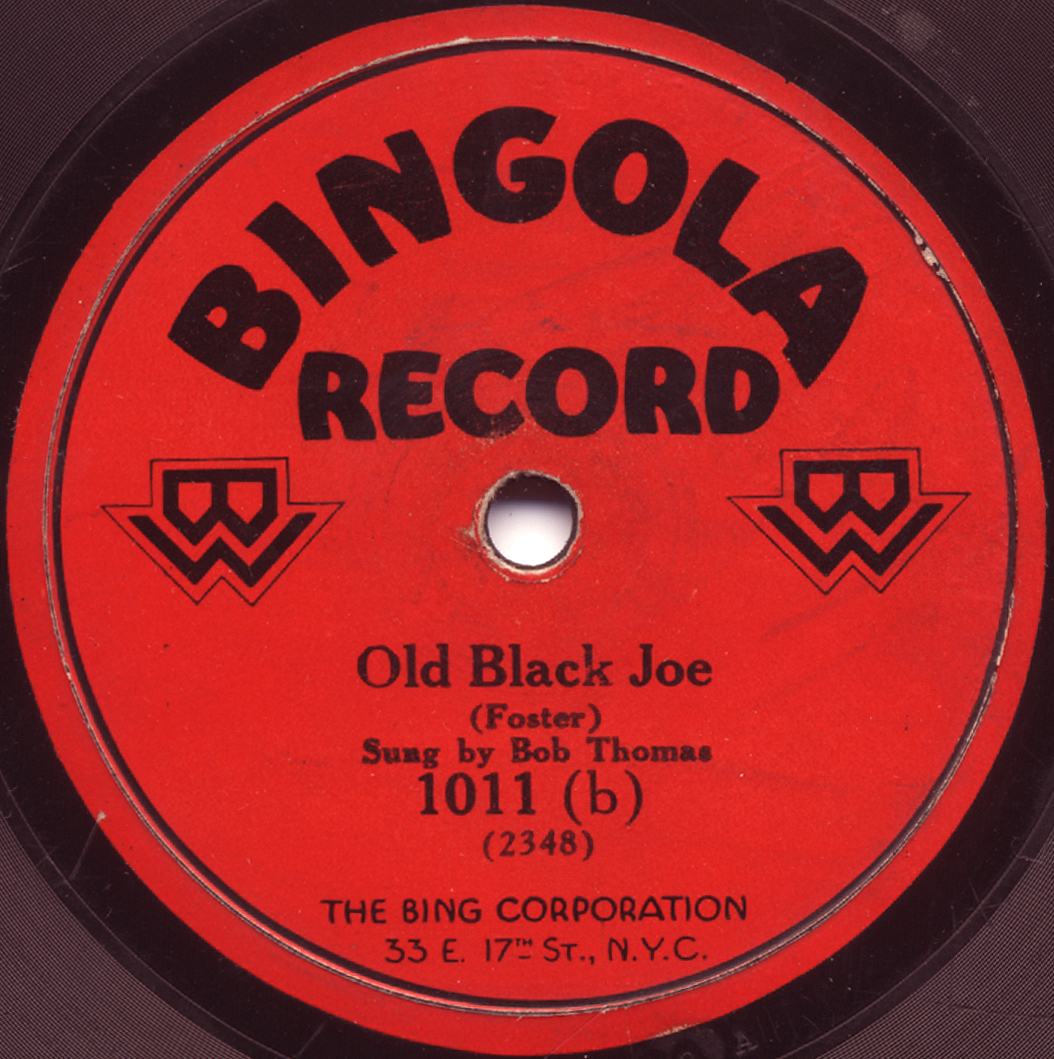

Lists of record labels cover record labels, brands or trademarks associated with marketing of music recordings and music videos. The lists are organized alphabetically, by genre, by company and by location.

== Alphabetical ==
- List of record labels: 0–9
- List of record labels: A–H
- List of record labels: I–Q
- List of record labels: R–Z

== By artists ==
- Record labels owned by James Brown
- Bing Crosby's record labels after 1955
- List of Wu-Recording record labels

== By genre ==
- List of Christian record labels
- List of electronic music record labels
- List of hip hop record labels
  - List of West Coast hip hop record labels
- List of industrial music labels

== By company ==
- List of EMI labels
- List of Kakao M labels
- List of Sony Music labels
  - Record labels owned by Sony BMG
- List of Universal Music Group labels
- List of Warner Music Group labels
- List of BMG Rights Management labels

== By location ==
- List of Bangladeshi record labels
- List of record labels from Bristol
- List of record labels from Estonia
- List of New Zealand record labels
- List of Quebec record labels
- List of independent UK record labels
