= Hey Jude (disambiguation) =

"Hey Jude" is a 1968 song by the Beatles.

Hey Jude may also refer to:

- Hey Jude (Beatles album), 1970
- Hey Jude (Wilson Pickett album), 1969
- Hey Jude (film), a 2018 Malayalam-language Indian film

== See also ==
- Hey Jude/Hey Bing!, an album by Bing Crosby
