= Jack Be Nimble (disambiguation) =

Jack Be Nimble is a nursery rhyme.

Jack Be Nimble may also refer to:

- Jack Be Nimble (film), a 1993 horror movie
- Jack B. Nimble – A Mother Goose Fantasy, a 1957 album by Bing Crosby
- Jack-be-Nimble, a character from Babes in Toyland

== See also ==
- Jack (hero)
