= Ali Baba and the Forty Thieves (album) =

Ali Baba and the Forty Thieves (Bing Crosby Album)

Studio album by Bing Crosby
- Released: October 1957
- Recorded: April 25, 1957
- Genre: vocal
- Length: 17:56
- Label: Golden Records (A298:20)

Bing Crosby chronology
A Christmas Story - An Axe, An Apple and a Buckskin Jacket (1957)	Ali Baba and the Forty Thieves (Bing Crosby Album) (1957)	New Tricks (1957)

Ali Baba and the Forty Thieves is the twenty-second solo studio album by American actor and singer Bing Crosby made for children by Golden Records in 1957. The Arthur Norman Choir and Orchestra provide support. The music was by Mary Rodgers and the lyrics by Sammy Cahn. The album has been reissued by various record companies sometimes in a different edited form. The song "I Love You Whoever You Are" was issued as a single by Kapp Records (KAPP195) in October 1957.

The album was included on a CD titled “Once upon a Mattress” issued by Sepia Records in 2010.

== Background ==
In the fall and winter of 1957, Golden Records issued a number of new children’s records. Bing Crosby was enlisted to read and sing four of the stories and in addition to Ali Baba and the Forty Thieves there were A Christmas Story - An Axe, An Apple and a Buckskin Jacket, Never Be Afraid and Jack B. Nimble – A Mother Goose Fantasy.

== Reception ==
Billboard was positive. "At $2.98, with Bing and considerable ballyhoo, this can’t miss, especially on the racks. Tunes by Sammy Cahn and Mary Rodgers, are delightful, and Bing sings well. He also narrates in that inimitable, informal manner. More discriminating parents will object to the gore and certain elements of morality involved, but the mass market will not be deterred."

The New York Times commented: "Ali Baba and the Forty Thieves, with Crosby again at the controls, is a musical rendition of this old favorite from ‘The Arabian Nights’. The lyrics are by Sammy Cahn, the music by Mary Rodgers. They have combined to make some outstanding songs, especially one called ‘My Own Individual Star’. Singing these songs, Crosby is his amiable self, but as a narrator he occasionally sounds as if he has not removed his pipe stem from his mouth!"

Crosby enthusiast and author Fred Reynolds had some reservations. "Neither music nor lyrics are in any way distinguished and Crosby’s singing offers nothing noteworthy, His narration, however, is good and it says something for his powers of persuasion that he invests this amoral and unwholesome tale with a modicum of charm…"

== Track listing ==
Side one

1. A long time ago in Persia (narration)
2. Year In, Year Out
3. Ali Baba always hoped (narration) / My Own Individual Star
4. 40 Thieves 40 (chorus)
5. Open Sesame
6. My Own Individual Star

Side two

1. Well now, Ali Baba’s brother, Kassim (narration)
2. One Rich Brother
3. Open Sesame! Kassim was trapped! (narration)
4. One of us is a thief (chorus)
5. I Love You Whoever You Are
6. One Rich Brother
7. They All Lived Happily Ever After
