= Chee Chee-Oo Chee (Sang the Little Bird) =

Song

"Chee Chee-Oo Chee (Sang the Little Bird)" is a popular song with music by Saverio Seracini (some sources give his first name as "Severio" but "Saverio" seems the consensus spelling), the original Italian language lyrics by Ettore Minoretti, and English lyrics by John Turner and Geoffrey Parsons, published in 1955. Originally An Italian song, "Ci Ciu Ci Cantava un Usignol", with versions by Natalino Otto and Narciso Parigi. It was entered in the San Remo Festival in 1955 where it came seventh.

A number of recorded versions were made in 1955, but the Perry Como/Jaye P. Morgan version was the biggest hit. The Como/Morgan recording (with Mitchell Ayres' orchestra), made on April 28, 1955, was released by RCA Victor as 78 rpm catalog number 20-6137 and 45 rpm catalog number 47–6137, with the flip side "Two Lost Souls." It reached #12 on the song charts in the United States.

== Other recordings ==
- Petula Clark (1955) - subsequently included in the album The Polygon Years, Vol. 2.
- Alma Cogan (1955)
- Bing Crosby - recorded the song in 1955 for use on his radio show and it was subsequently included in the album New Tricks - 60th Anniversary Deluxe Edition (2017)
- Gaylords (1955)
- Dean Martin, with his version reaching No. 8 in Australia (1955)
