= I'll Remember Today =

"I'll Remember Today" is a popular song.

The music was written by Edith Piaf, the lyrics by William Engvick. First recorded by Piaf, it was later popularized by Patti Page in the United States and by Ruby Murray in the United Kingdom.

The recording by Patti Page was released by Mercury Records as catalog number 71189. It first reached the Billboard magazine charts on November 11, 1957. On the Disk Jockey chart, it peaked at #23; on the Best Seller chart, at #31; on the composite chart of the top 100 songs, it reached #32.

== Other recordings ==
- Bing Crosby - recorded the song for his radio show in 1957 and it was subsequently released on the CD New Tricks - 60th Anniversary Deluxe Edition in 2017.
- Vera Lynn - single release for Decca Records (1957).
