= Caterina (song) =

Song by Perry Como

Single by Perry Como
- B-side: "The Island of Forgotten Lovers"
- Released: March 25, 1962
- Recorded: 1962
- Length: 2:11
- Label: RCA Victor
- Songwriters: Earl Shuman, Maurice "Bugs" Bower

Perry Como singles chronology
| "You're Following Me" (1961) | "Caterina" (1962) | "(I Love You) Don't You Forget It" (1963) |

A-side; 45 rpm vinyl
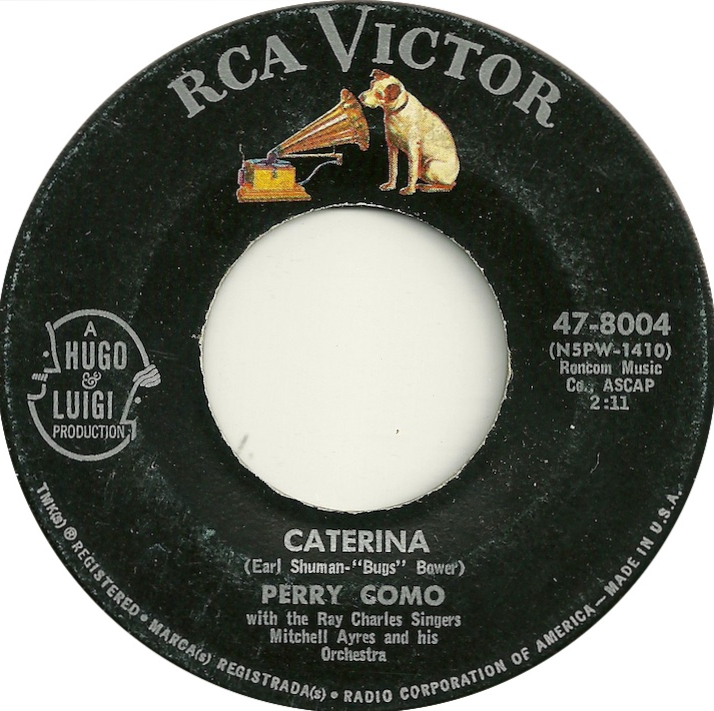
- US release, RCA Victor Records

Audio
- "Caterina" on YouTube

"Caterina" is a song originally recorded and released by Perry Como. It reached number 23 in the United States, number 37 in the UK and was also a hit in numerous other countries.

== Writing and release ==
The song was written by Earl Shuman and Maurice "Bugs" Bower.

It was originally released by Como in 1962 as a single, coupled with "The Island of Forgotten Lovers".

== Track listing ==
7" single (RCA Victor 47-8004)
| No. | Title | Writer(s) | Length |
|---|---|---|---|
| 1. | "Caterina" | Earl Shuman; Bugs Bower | 2:11 |
| 2. | "The Island of Forgotten Lovers" | Dick Manning; Kay Twomey | 2:35 |

== Charts ==
| Chart (1962) | Peak position |
|---|---|
| Belgium (Ultratop 50 Flanders) | 3 |
| Belgium (Ultratop 50 Wallonia) | 49 |
| Canada (CHUM Chart) | 13 |
| Germany (GfK) | 11 |
| Norway (VG-lista) | 6 |
| UK Singles (OCC) | 37 |
| US Adult Contemporary (Billboard) | 6 |
| US Billboard Hot 100 | 23 |
