= Never Be Afraid =

Never Be Afraid: A Musical Version of The Emperor's New Clothes

Studio album by Bing Crosby
- Released: March 1958
- Recorded: April 25, 1957
- Genre: Vocal
- Length: 14:49
- Label: Golden Records (A198:22)

Bing Crosby chronology
The Bible Story of Christmas (1957)	Never Be Afraid: A Musical Version of The Emperor's New Clothes (1958)	Jack B. Nimble – A Mother Goose Fantasy (1958)

Never Be Afraid is the twenty-fourth solo studio album by American singer and actor Bing Crosby made for children by Golden Records in 1957. It is a musical adaptation of The Emperor's New Clothes, the fairy story with a moral by Hans Christian Andersen. The music was by Lew Spence and the lyrics by Alan Bergman and Marilyn Keith.

The album has never been issued on commercial CD. The song "Never Be Afraid" was issued as a single by Kapp Records (KAPP195) in October 1957.

== Background ==
In April 1957, Golden Records recorded a number of new children's records. Bing Crosby was enlisted to read and sing four of the stories and in addition to Never Be Afraid there were Ali Baba and the Forty Thieves, A Christmas Story - An Axe, An Apple and a Buckskin Jacket, and Jack B. Nimble – A Mother Goose Fantasy.

== Reception ==
The album was positively reviewed by Billboard magazine upon its release, who described it as "A warm, musical version of the famous Hans Christian Andersen story narrated and sung delightfully by Bing Crosby. The music adds much to the story, and it ends up pointing a moral for the kids. Second side contains a medley of the musical score."

== Track listing ==
Side one

1. "The Best Dressed Man in the World (opening chorus)"
2. "The Best Dressed Man in the World"
3. "Never Be Afraid"

Side two

1. "Medley of musical score"
