= William Engvick =

American lyricist

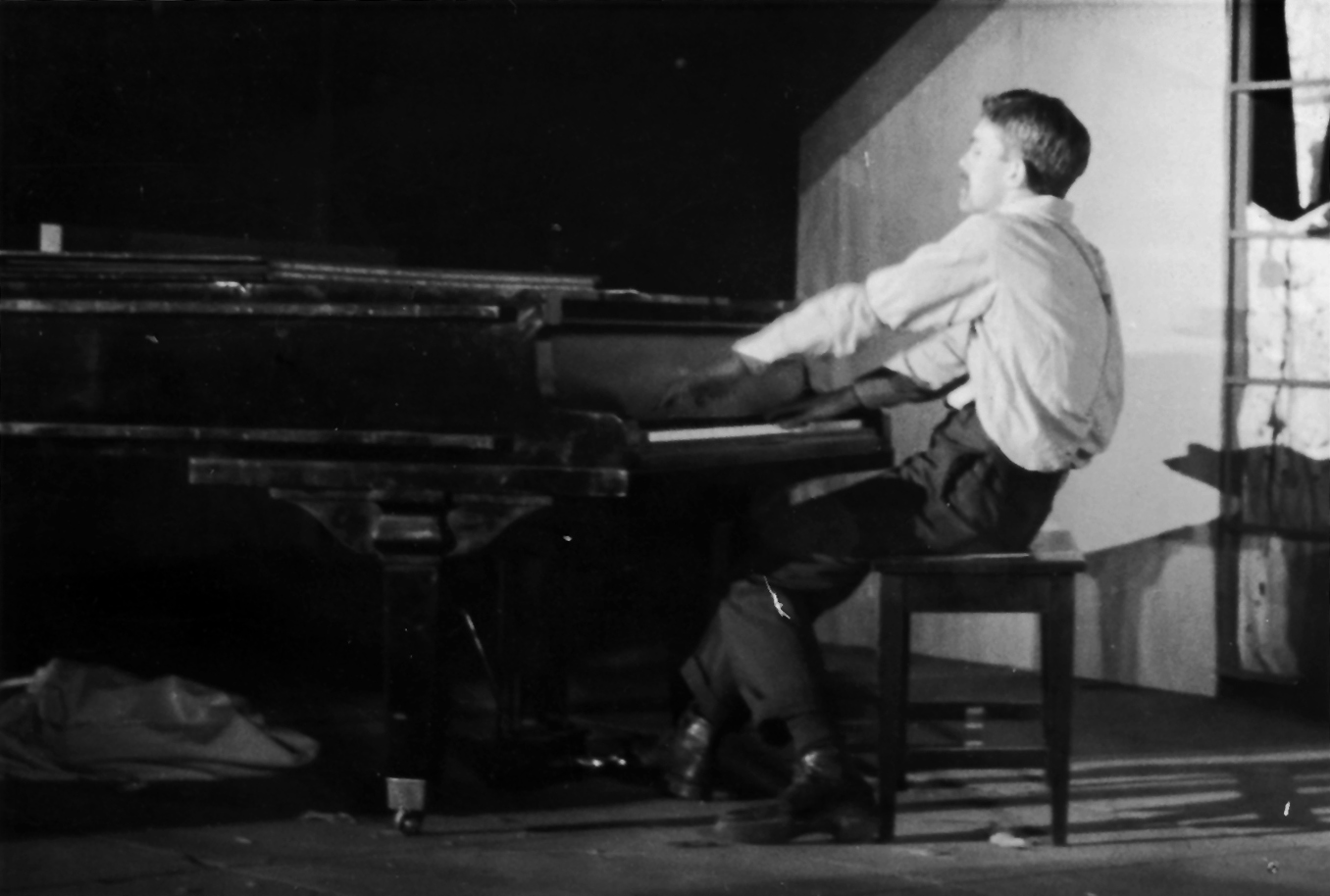
Bill Engvick playing piano in 1937.

William Engvick (July 1, 1914, Oakland, California – September 4, 2012, Oakland, California) was an American lyricist, many of whose compositions appear in films.

Engvick graduated from the University of California, Berkeley in 1937. He is best known for his collaborations with composer Alec Wilder; they produced songs for the Broadway musical Once Over Lightly (1942), and for the musical television specials Miss Chicken Little (1953), Pinocchio (1957) and Hansel and Gretel (1958), Engvick was also responsible for a number of English-language lyrics to songs originally composed in French. Among his lyrics in this category were "The Song from Moulin Rouge" and "I'll Remember Today."

== Selected songs ==
- While We're Young (Don Cherry song) 1951
