= Thoroughly Modern Bing =

1968 album by Bing Crosby

Studio album by Bing Crosby
- Released: 1968
- Recorded: February 9, 12, 1968
- Genre: Vocal
- Label: Pickwick
- Producer: Joe Abend

Bing Crosby chronology
Bing Crosby and The Columbus Boychoir Sing Family Christmas Favorites (w/ The Columbus Boychoir) (1967)	Thoroughly Modern Bing (1968)	Bing Crosby's Treasury - The Songs I Love (1968)

Thoroughly Modern Bing is the thirty-fifth solo studio album by American singer and actor Bing Crosby for Pickwick Records at Mastertone Recording Studio in Long Island City, New York. The orchestral tracks were conducted by Bugs Bower with a vocal group under the direction of Don Marshall. Crosby subsequently over-dubbed his vocals at two separate sessions in February 1968.

Another song, "Where the Rainbow Ends" was also recorded on February 12, 1968, but did not appear on the original vinyl album. It was included on a LaserLight CD in 1991. A song called "That's All I Want from You" (written by M. Rotha) was also recorded on the same day but has never surfaced.

The album was issued on CD in 1991 by LaserLight as "Bing Crosby - A Visit to the Movies (CD: 15 411) and by Pickwick Records in 1997 as "Bing Crosby at His Best" (1128-2). The song "(I Call You) Sunshine" was not included on the LaserLight CD.

== Reception ==
Billboard said: "In this uptempo album, the old crooner shows that he still has much of the fire that ranked him among yesterday's superstars. Here he is applying his unique style to some recent top chart riders with interesting results."

The British publication "The Gramophone" commented: "Meanwhile there is overwhelming evidence that Mr. Crosby has lost none of his charm or skill in Thoroughly Modern Bing (Stateside SL10257). He works his lasting magic on “Talk to the Animals,” “Love Is Blue,” “Chim Chim Cheree,” and other modern songs of quality plus the oldie “Ding Dong the Witch Is Dead” with the same ease and warmth that was discernible in 1928. He even transforms a blatant flag-waver like “What’s More American” into something tolerable, and is the first singer to hold my attention throughout “Puff (The Magic Dragon)” without causing a single wince."

== Track listing ==
Side one
No.	Title	Writer(s)	Length
1.	"Talk to the Animals"	Leslie Bricusse	3:07
2.	"Love Is Blue (L'amour est bleu)"	Bryan Blackburn, André Popp	2:36
3.	"Ding-Dong! The Witch Is Dead"	Harold Arlen, E.Y.Harburg	2:16
4.	"Chim Chim Cher-ee"	Robert B. Sherman, Richard M. Sherman	3:04
5.	"(I Call You) Sunshine"	Jack Wolf, John Howard, "Bugs" Bower	2:07
6.	"High Hopes"	Jimmy Van Heusen, Sammy Cahn	2:43

Side two
No.	Title	Writer(s)	Length
7.	"Thoroughly Modern Millie"	Jimmy Van Heusen, Sammy Cahn	2:15
8.	"My Friend, the Doctor"	Leslie Bricusse	3:00
9.	"Up, Up and Away"	Jimmy Webb	2:54
10.	"Puff, the Magic Dragon"	Peter Yarrow, Leonard Lipton	3:07
11.	"What's More American?"	Kadish Millet	2:33

Bonus track on Laserlight CD
No.	Title	Writer(s)	Length
12.	"Where the Rainbow Ends"	Roger Cook, Roger Greenaway	2:30
