= A Time to Be Jolly =

Studio album by Bing Crosby
- Released: 1971
- Recorded: 1970, 1971
- Genre: Christmas
- Label: Daybreak (DR 2006)
- Producer: Sonny Burke

Bing Crosby chronology
Goldilocks (1969)	A Time to Be Jolly (1971)	Bing 'n' Basie (1972)

A Time to Be Jolly is the thirty-seventh solo studio album by American singer and actor Bing Crosby for RCA imprint Daybreak Records (DR 2006) at Mercury Sound Studio West on Mission Street, San Francisco. Crosby was supported by Jack Halloran and the Voices of Christmas with the orchestra conducted by Les Brown.

Four tracks were originally recorded on November 16, 1970 and the remainder were overdubbed by Crosby on September 7/8, 1971 using orchestral tracks recorded on August 31, 1971. Several tracks have the Voices of Christmas singing a few lines from the Alfred Burt carols as an introduction and these are shown in the listing. Another song, "An Old-Fashioned Christmas", is thought to have been overdubbed by Crosby but it has never been released.

The album was reissued on LP by 20th Century Fox Records (as A Holiday Toast) in 1977, and on CD by PolyGram Records (as Christmas Album) in 1994.

== Reception ==
Billboard commented: "Crosby joins the new Daybreak label (handled by RCA), with his first Christmas package in many years! An exceptional one it is! With fresh material, Crosby is in top vocal form with the title tune as well as with 'Christmas Toast' and 'I Sing Noel.' Delightful package, it should prove a heavy seller for the season."

== Track listing ==
Side one
No.	Title	Writer(s)	Introduction	Length
1.	"A Time to Be Jolly"	Lee Hale, Les Brown, Sonny Burke		2:10
2.	"I Sing Noel"	Noël Regney, Gloria Shayne Baker	"Some Children See Him"	2:45
3.	"'Round and 'Round the Christmas Tree"	Jay Livingston, Ray Evans	"Come, Dear Children"	2:34
4.	"The First Family of Christmas"	Sonny Burke, Paul Francis Webster	"All on a Christmas Morning"	3:10
5.	"The Song of Christmas"	Kui Lee		3:00

Side two
No.	Title	Writer(s)	Introduction	Length
1.	"A Christmas Toast"	Ken Lane, Irving Taylor		2:51
2.	"And the Bells Rang"	Leroy Hale, Joel Herron	"Caroling, Caroling"	2:41
3.	"Christmas Is"	Percy Faith, Spence Maxwell	"Bright, Bright, the Holly Berries"	3:11
4.	"When You Trim Your Christmas Tree"	Bill Carey, E. B. Powell, Sonny Burke	"We'll Dress the House"	3:07
5.	"Christmas Is Here to Stay"	Alan Kohan, Bill Angelos		4:05
