= Bing 'n' Basie =

Studio album by Bing Crosby and Count Basie
- Released: 1972
- Recorded: February 28–29, March 1, 14–16, 1972
- Genre: Vocal jazz
- Length: 34:00
- Label: Daybreak
- Producer: Sonny Burke

Bing Crosby chronology
A Time to Be Jolly (1971)	Bing 'n' Basie (1972)	Rhythm on the Range (Coral ) (1972)

Count Basie chronology
Have a Nice Day (1971)	Bing 'n' Basie (1972)	Flip, Flop and Fly (1972)

Professional ratings
Review scores
Source	Rating
Allmusic	3/5 stars

Bing 'n' Basie is a 1972 vinyl album recorded for Daybreak Records by Bing Crosby, accompanied by Count Basie and his Orchestra. The orchestral tracks were laid down over three days at the end of February and the beginning of March, 1972 at Amigo Studios, North Hollywood. Crosby added his voice to the pre-recorded orchestral tracks during three sessions on March 14, 15, and 16, 1972 at Coast Recorders Studio, Bush Street, San Francisco. Bing Crosby also added his voice to "If I Had a Hammer" and while this has appeared on pirate issues it has never been commercially released.

== Reception ==
Howard Lucraft writing in Variety commented:"Interesting that Bing sounds better today to many than in his Paul Whiteman days over 40 years ago when his keys were about a third higher. He could be more adventurous range-wise back then. He used to feature "Old Man River" in D flat, going to a top F. On this new LP wisely tunes are mainly up-tempo. Crosby reportedly sang to tracks prerecorded by the Basie band. Sam Nestico's charts are swinging. Something should have been done about that final top D flat on "Put Your Hand in the Hand". Otherwise album is highly effective - simple with charm. The slower "Sugar, Don't You Know" by Louis Bellson is a great new number."

Down Beat said: "This release is likely to do considerably more for Crosby's reputation than for Basie's. That's usually the way it works when a jazz group teams with a popular vocalist. On the other hand, it is Crosby's reputation that is in considerably greater need of a boost than Basie's, so perhaps in the long run it’s a fair shake for everyone... (Crosby) is in fine voice all the way, and the choice of material is from among the best contemporary tunes, excepting two ringers (Hangin', Day), which are the sort of nonentities that singers use to open TV variety specials."

== Track listing ==
Side one
No.	Title	Writer(s)	Length
1.	"Gentle on My Mind"	John Hartford	3:45
2.	"Everything Is Beautiful"	Ray Stevens	3:19
3.	"Gonna Build a Mountain"	Leslie Bricusse, Anthony Newley	2:36
4.	"Sunrise, Sunset"	Jerry Bock, Sheldon Harnick	2:43
5.	"Hangin' Loose"	Sammy Nestico, Johnny Mercer	2:32
6.	"All His Children"	Henry Mancini, Alan Bergman, Marilyn Bergman	3:01

Side two
No.	Title	Writer(s)	Length
7.	"Put Your Hand in the Hand"	Gene MacLellan	3:12
8.	"Snowbird"	Gene MacLellan	2:56
9.	"Little Green Apples"	Bobby Russell	3:15
10.	"Sugar, Don't You Know"	Peggy Lee, Louis Bellson, Jack Hayes	3:23
11.	"Have a Nice Day"	Sammy Nestico, Johnny Mercer	2:55

== Personnel ==
- Bing Crosby - vocals

The Count Basie Orchestra

- Oscar Peterson - piano
- Sammy Nestico - arranger
