= Bing Crosby's Treasury – The Songs I Love (1968 version) =

Studio album by Bing Crosby
- Released: 1968
- Recorded: March 26–28, 1968
- Genre: Traditional pop
- Label: Longines Symphonette Society

Bing Crosby chronology
| Thoroughly Modern Bing (1968) | Bing Crosby's Treasury – The Songs I Love (1968) | Hey Jude / Hey Bing! (1969) |

Bing Crosby's Treasury – The Songs I Love is an LP set by Bing Crosby, issued in both mono and stereo formats by a mail-order firm, The Longines Symphonette Society, which was an educational service from the Longines-Wittnauer Watch Company. A similar LP set had been issued in 1966 (Bing Crosby's Treasury – The Songs I Love), and this updated version had a total of 36 Crosby vocals.

== Background ==
Very similar to the 1966 set, this was a six-LP album comprising seventy-one tunes chosen by Bing Crosby. The previous set had sixteen Crosby vocals and for this set he over-dubbed his voice to another twenty of the original orchestral tracks. The remaining tracks on the album were orchestral. On each side of all six LPs there were included three Crosby recordings and with the set there was an additional free "souvenir" LP (Bing Crosby's All Time Hit Parade) which consisted of 1930s and 1940s recordings by Crosby. The cost in the UK was £7.18.6d plus 8/6d postage and payment for it could be made in monthly instalments of £1 for seven months plus a final payment of 18/6d.

The director of the Society, Mishel Piastro, described as "Dean of American conductors, famed violin virtuoso and leader of the sessions" seemed, implicitly, to be the conductor of the orchestra and such was assumed until several years later when the popular British conductor and arranger Geoff Love revealed that he had made the arrangements and orchestral recordings in England. Crosby over-dubbed his voice later at Coast Recorders, San Francisco.

== Reception ==
Ralph Harding writing in the fanzine "The Crosby Collector" said: "I have played and replayed all these tracks and paid particular attention to the 'new' and previously unissued tracks. The recording is excellent and quite up to the standard of the first 16 sides on the first Longines album issue. Without a doubt, they have captured a very pleasant and happy balance. No real complaints in this direction. And it would be impossible to choose any one side that towers above all. Each and every track is good and excellent Bing. Crosby appears perfectly at home on these oldies – 'standards' if you like – because they occupy a firm niche in any catalogue."

== Track listing ==
All are orchestral tracks except where marked "(sung by Bing Crosby)".

Bing Crosby's Treasury – The Songs I Love'

LWS 343 – Side one

1. "That Old Gang of Mine" (sung by Bing Crosby) – 2:35
2. "Ac-Cent-Tchu-Ate the Positive"
3. "Marie" (sung by Bing Crosby) – 2:36
4. "Cheek to Cheek"
5. "One for My Baby" (sung by Bing Crosby) – 3:30

LWS 343 – Side two

1. "River, Stay 'Way from My Door" (Mort Dixon, Harry M. Woods) (sung by Bing Crosby) – 2:56
2. "Joobalai" (Ralph Rainger, Leo Robin)
3. "What'll I Do" (sung by Bing Crosby) – 2:46
4. "After You've Gone" / "San Fernando Valley" (Gordon Jenkins)
5. "When My Sugar Walks Down the Street" (sung by Bing Crosby) – 2:27

LWS 344 – Side one

1. "Ballin' the Jack" (sung by Bing Crosby) – 2:09
2. "Blue Skies" / "Red Sails in the Sunset"
3. "Ole Buttermilk Sky" (Hoagy Carmichael / Jack Brooks) (sung by Bing Crosby) – 3:42
4. "Riders in the Sky"
5. "The Song Is Ended" (sung by Bing Crosby) – 3:21

LWS 344 – Side two

1. "I've Heard That Song Before" (sung by Bing Crosby) – 2:30
2. "Mister Meadowlark" (Walter Donaldson / Johnny Mercer)
3. "Remember" (sung by Bing Crosby) – 3:07
4. "I Love My Baby" (Harry Warren, Bud Green) / "Mr. Sandman"
5. "I'll Take Romance" (Ben Oakland, Oscar Hammerstein II) (sung by Bing Crosby) – 2:51

LWS 345 – Side one

1. "Puttin' On the Ritz" (sung by Bing Crosby) – 2:38
2. "Sophisticated Lady"
3. "Always" (sung by Bing Crosby) – 2:55
4. "You're Mine, You" (Johnny Green, Edward Heyman) / "Gimme A Little Kiss (Will Ya, Huh?)" (Maceo Pinkard / Roy Turk / Jack Smith)
5. "Thank You for a Lovely Evening" (Jimmy McHugh / Dorothy Fields) (sung by Bing Crosby) – 2:43

LWS 345 – Side two

1. "Love Makes the World Go 'Round" (sung by Bing Crosby) – 2:15
2. "These Foolish Things"
3. "All Alone" (sung by Bing Crosby) – 2:48
4. "Ain't Misbehavin'" / "Nobody's Sweetheart"
5. "Coquette" (sung by Bing Crosby) – 2:41

LWS 346 – Side one

1. "Sentimental Gentleman from Georgia" (Frank Perkins, Mitchell Parish) (sung by Bing Crosby) – 2:23
2. "Dear Hearts and Gentle People"
3. "Lonesome and Sorry" (Benny Davis, Con Conrad) (sung by Bing Crosby) – 3:13
4. "Maybe" / "So Rare"
5. "There's Danger in Your Eyes, Cherie" (Pete Wendling / Jack Meskill / Harry Richman) (sung by Bing Crosby) – 2:57

LWS 346 – Side two

1. "Say It Isn't So" (sung by Bing Crosby) – 3:02
2. "(There'll Be Bluebirds Over) The White Cliffs of Dover" / "Drifting and Dreaming"
3. "Tenderly" (sung by Bing Crosby) – 3:00
4. "The Peanut Vendor"
5. "South of the Border" (sung by Bing Crosby) – 3:36

LWS 347 – Side one

1. "Say Si Si" (sung by Bing Crosby) – 3:02
2. "Honeymoon" (Joseph E. Howard / Will M. Hough / Frank R. Adams) / "The Anniversary Waltz"
3. "Friendly Persuasion" (sung by Bing Crosby) – 3:46
4. "Imagination"
5. "Amapola" (sung by Bing Crosby) – 2:57

LWS 347 – Side two

1. "I Hear Music (sung by Bing Crosby) – 2:40
2. "Just an Echo in the Valley" (Harry M. Woods / Jimmy Campbell / Reg Connelly) / "Cecilia"
3. "In the Chapel in the Moonlight" (sung by Bing Crosby) – 3:27
4. "A Nightingale Sang in Berkeley Square"
5. "Stormy Weather" (sung by Bing Crosby) – 3:38

LWS 348 – Side one

1. "How Come You Do Me Like You Do?" (sung by Bing Crosby) – 2:47
2. "I'm Confessin' (That I Love You)" / "If I Had You"
3. "My Prayer" (sung by Bing Crosby) – 3:03
4. "Yours"
5. "Rock-a-Bye Your Baby with a Dixie Melody" (sung by Bing Crosby) – 3:06

LWS 348 – Side two

1. "Dance with a Dolly" (Terry Shand, Dave Kapp, Jimmy Eaton, Mickey Leader) (sung by Bing Crosby) – 2:34
2. "Russian Lullaby" (Irving Berlin) / "One Morning in May"
3. "Isn't This a Lovely Day?" (sung by Bing Crosby) – 2:38
4. "Steppin' Out with My Baby"
5. "The Breeze and I" (sung by Bing Crosby) – 2:44

Bing Crosby's All Time Hit Parade (1968 version) (LWS 349)
Side one

1. "Where the Blue of the Night" (recorded November 23, 1931)
2. "Sweet and Lovely" (Gus Arnheim, Harry Tobias, Jules Lemare) (recorded September 14, 1931)
3. "Out of Nowhere" (recorded March 30, 1931)
4. "June in January" (recorded November 9, 1934)
5. "Goodnight Sweetheart" (recorded October 8, 1931)

Side two

1. "Just One More Chance" (Arthur Johnston / Sam Coslow) (recorded May 4, 1931)
2. "Love Is Just around the Corner" (recorded November 9, 1934)
3. "It's Easy to Remember" (recorded February 21, 1935)
4. "Let Me Call You Sweetheart" (recorded August 8, 1934)
5. "Moonlight Becomes You" (recorded June 12, 1942)
