= Goldilocks (album) =

Goldilocks (Bing Crosby album)

Soundtrack album by Bing Crosby
- Released: 1970
- Recorded: 1969
- Genre: Soundtrack, Vocal
- Length: 23:50
- Label: Disneyland Records DL-3511

Bing Crosby chronology
Hey Jude / Hey Bing! (1969)	Goldilocks (Bing Crosby album) (1970)	A Time to Be Jolly (1971)

Goldilocks is a 12" soundtrack vinyl album taken from the live-action/animated De-Patie-Freleng TV film Goldilocks shown on NBC on March 31, 1970. It was first released in 1970 as DL-3511 by Disneyland Records for a special promotion of Evans-Black Carpets by Armstrong. The album could be purchased for $2.25. When the promotion period had expired, the album was re-released by Disneyland Records as ST-3889 with an accompanying 12-page storybook. The recording is particularly important to the Bing Crosby career as he recorded commercial tracks in every year from 1926 to 1977 and this album represents his only recording work for 1969.

The film starred:

- Bing Crosby (Himself/Papa Bear)
- Kathryn Crosby (Herself/Mama Bear)
- Mary Frances Crosby (Herself/Goldilocks)
- Nathaniel Crosby (Himself/Baby Bear)
- Avery Schreiber (Forest Animals) and
- Paul Winchell (Narrator, Bob Cat, Animals)

All the songs were written by Robert and Richard Sherman, who co-produced the film and were instrumental in getting the album released on Disneyland Records. The music was arranged by Doug Goodwin. The film was sponsored by Evans-Black Carpets. Songs and selected dialogue clips were included in the soundtrack album along with narration by famed voice-over actor Paul Winchell.

Ralph Harding, writing in "The Crosby Collector", described the LP: "The record album is a two-sleeved effort and extremely attractive with the whole of the centre, a fold of approximately 12.75" by 25" taken up with no less than 18 beautifully coloured shots from the color TV production".

== Background ==
The Crosby family recorded the sound track for "Goldilocks" on June 16, 1969, and location work for the television show was subsequently filmed at Coldwater Canyon, Los Angeles County the same week.

The songs "Take a Longer Look" and "The Human Race" were re-recorded on February 19, 1970, with Jimmie Haskell and his Orchestra at A&M Studios on La Brea Avenue in Hollywood for possible release as a pop single. The tracks were not released until they appeared on a Collectors' Choice Music CD "So Rare: Treasures From The Crosby Archive" in 2010.

The album itself has never appeared on CD.

== Reception ==
The film was reviewed by Variety who commented: "This update of the familiar children's folk tale was a puzzling network, prime time, programming anomaly. For one thing, it was aired at 8.30 p.m. EST, later than would be indicated by its pre-teen approach to both the story and its affixed message...Technically, the show had considerable gloss, including a couple of pleasant, original tunes. The mixture of animation and live actors was well handled and the acting was passable...Finally, there was one very heavy in-show plug for a record of the show that could be bought for $1.98 (regular price $3.98) only at the sponsor’s carpet stores. It was narrated by Bing and was done with no separation from the story. This is the sort of marginal commercial pitch that raises the hackles on parents’ necks".

Ralph Harding writing in "The Crosby Collector" commented: "The story and beautifully coloured pictures are excellent. There's a great coloured photo on the back showing Bing, Kathy, Mary Frances and Nathaniel in a large camp (tents, primus, stores, equipment etc.) holding a black bear cub. It looks pretty ferocious to me! And they look a most handsome family, indeed...The orchestra opens with a bright and breezy number and the narrator opens up the story about Bing and his family. And while Bing is cleaning the fish, he tells the story of "Goldilocks" in his typical racy style, breaking into a delightful number "Take a longer look around you, and you might see more than you ever saw before" and the story unfolds. Avery Schreiber plays the bad-tempered bobcat and he's terrific. Bing sings "The Human Race" explaining to Mary Frances the ways of people and I've yet to hear him sing better during the past twenty years! This is a bright and catchy number which would sell a million if issued and exploited...Strictly for the children from five to ninety and I loved every single moment of it".

Michael Crampton writing in BING magazine liked it too: "It is a perfect example of just how good contemporary Bing is when given the right material. Here he is singing a song "Take a Longer Look", with a melodic deep happy voice, which for me is a joy to hear".

== Track listing ==
SIDE ONE

1. "Overture
2. "Take a Longer Look" (Bing Crosby)
3. "The Human Race" (Bing Crosby, Kathryn Crosby)

SIDE TWO

1. "Don't Settle for Less (Than the Best)" (Mary Frances Crosby)
2. "Take a Longer Look (reprise)" (Bing Crosby, Kathryn Crosby)
3. "Take a Longer Look (finale)" (Bing Crosby)
