= N'écoute pas les idoles =

Studio album by France Gall
- Released: March 1964
- Genres: Yé-yé, chanson

France Gall chronology
N'écoute pas les idoles (1964)	Mes premières vraies vacances (1964)

France Gall, commonly called N'écoute pas les idoles after the opening track, is the debut 10-inch LP record by French singer France Gall. It was released in March 1964. On the recordings, Gall is accompanied by Alain Goraguer and his orchestra.

The album is a compilation of the extended plays Ne sois pas si bête (1963), and N'écoute pas les idoles (1964).

== Track listing ==
Side A
No.	Title	Length
1.	"N'écoute pas les idoles"	1:50
2.	"Les Rubans et la fleur"	2:45
3.	"J'entends cette musique"	2:33
4.	"Ça va je t'aime"	2:13

Side B
No.	Title	Length
1.	"Ne sois pas si bête"	2:16
2.	"Ne dis pas aux copains"	2:34
3.	"Si j'étais garçon"	2:10
4.	"Pense à moi"	2:32
