= A Christmas Story – An Axe, an Apple and a Buckskin Jacket =

A Christmas Story – An Axe, An Apple and a Buckskin Jacket

Studio album by Bing Crosby
- Released: October 1957
- Recorded: April 24, 1957
- Genre: Vocal
- Length: 21:28
- Label: Golden Records (A298:21)

Bing Crosby chronology
Bing with a Beat (1957)	A Christmas Story – An Axe, An Apple and a Buckskin Jacket (1957)	Ali Baba and the Forty Thieves (1957)

A Christmas Story – An Axe, An Apple and a Buckskin Jacket is the twenty-first solo studio album by American singer and actor Bing Crosby made for children by Golden Records in 1957. The Arthur Norman Choir and Orchestra provide support. The album has been reissued by various record companies sometimes with different titles such as "How Lovely Is Christmas" and even as a cardboard record by Bing Crosby Phonocards Inc. This took the form of a 7" cardboard disc at 33 1/3 revs which was issued as a publicity item for Goodyear Tyres and was issued free at Goodyear Service Stations.

The album was issued on CD by Drive Entertainment in 1998 with catalogue No. PUR1214.

== Background ==
In the fall and winter of 1957, Golden Records issued a number of new children's records and repackaged some of its steady favorites in a variety of speeds. The general trend was toward the long-playing record, LP, for the older child nearer 10 than 5, as this was more convenient and had greater fidelity. The small 78's and 45's were suitable for the younger child running his own machine fitfully—children seemed to enjoy changing the record as much as playing it.

Bing Crosby was enlisted to read and sing four of the stories and in addition to A Christmas Story there were Ali Baba and the Forty Thieves, Never Be Afraid and Jack B. Nimble – A Mother Goose Fantasy.

A Christmas Story was an original piece of work with book and lyrics by Arnold Sundgaard and music by Alec Wilder.

== Reception ==
Billboard was positive. "Sales can be made on this the year around, if pushed. It's Bing again at $2.98, in a fine story that leans on several American folk heroes, including Paul Bunyan, Johnny Appleseed, and Dan'l Boone. Story and lyrics by Arnold Sundgaard, music by Alec Wilder, and includes one tune that could become a big seasonal hit — "How Lovely Is Christmas". Sock packaging at the price."

The New York Times commented: "There are seven songs on the long-play record. The one most likely to be heard again, and again, in December is 'How Lovely Is Christmas', a somewhat sentimental song that is not especially for children. But there is one among these songs that is a standout and right in keeping with the story on the record. It is called 'An Axe, An Apple and a Buckskin Jacket'...Singing these songs, Crosby is his amiable self, but as a narrator he occasionally sounds as if he has not removed his pipe stem from his mouth!"

Crosby enthusiast and author, Fred Reynolds, had a favourable reaction too. "Crosby, the Chorus and musicians all give an excellent performance of this well constructed children's tale wherein character building qualities are bestowed upon the boy (strength from Paul Bunyan, hope from Johnny Appleseed and courage from Daniel Boone). The score is tuneful and well balanced and the instrumental arrangements most attractive."

== Track listing ==
SIDE ONE

1. How Lovely Is Christmas
2. "There have been almost 2000 Christmases..."
3. An Axe, an Apple and a Buckskin Jacket
4. "Now this cabin was so remote..."
5. Boy at a Window
6. "All of a sudden young Jethro heard..."
7. Young Jethro Swung His Mighty Axe

SIDE TWO

1. "Soon the cleared field looked mighty fine..."
2. Johnny Appleseed
3. "...and sure enough there was Dan'l Boone!"
4. Incident on Rogers Creek
5. "Well, of course young Jethro thought..."
6. How Lovely Is Christmas (reprise)
