= Jack B. Nimble – A Mother Goose Fantasy =

Studio album by Bing Crosby
- Released: March 1958
- Recorded: April 25, 1957
- Genre: vocal
- Length: 15:48
- Label: Golden Records (A198:23)

Bing Crosby chronology
Never Be Afraid (1958)	Jack B. Nimble – A Mother Goose Fantasy (1958)	Fancy Meeting You Here (w/ Rosemary Clooney) (1958)

Jack B. Nimble – A Mother Goose Fantasy is the twenty-fifth solo studio album by American singer and actor Bing Crosby made for children by Golden Records in 1957. It was a story of a small boy in search of his name. The music was by Dean Fuller and the lyrics and book by Marshall Barer.

The album was issued on CD by Drive Entertainment in 2001 (catalogue No. PUR0951).

== Background ==
In April 1957, Golden Records recorded a number of new children's records. Bing Crosby was enlisted to read and sing four of the stories and in addition to Jack B. Nimble – A Mother Goose Fantasy, there were Ali Baba and the Forty Thieves, A Christmas Story - An Axe, An Apple and a Buckskin Jacket, and Never Be Afraid.

== Reception ==
Billboard reviewed it saying: “An engrossing fable, interlaced with delightful songs, is narrated by Crosby with warmth and charm. Mixed chorus and ork shine. Flip features suite based on the tunes; moppets won’t enjoy it but parents may. The first side is worth the price, however.”

== Track listing ==
Side One

1. "Once upon a Time"
2. "One Early Afternoon"
3. "Medley: Old King Cole / Sing a Song of Sixpence / Mistress Mary / Humpty Dumpty / Little Boy Blue"
4. "We Don’t Know Where We’re Going"
5. "For Want of a Nail"
6. "Star Light, Star Bright"
7. "Jack B. Nimble"

Side Two
A Musical Suite based on the Themes and Mother Goose Melodies in "Jack B. Nimble" by Dean Fuller – played by the Golden Chamber Orchestra under the direction of Arthur Norman.

1. "The Candlestick Suite"
2. "The Candlestick Suite"
3. "The Candlestick Suite"
