= New Tricks (album) =

Studio album by Bing Crosby
- Released: 1957
- Recorded: 1955–1956
- Genre: Vocal
- Length: 30:47
- Label: Decca

Bing Crosby chronology
Ali Baba and the Forty Thieves (1957)	New Tricks (1957)	The Bible Story of Christmas (1957)

New Tricks is the twenty-third solo studio album by American singer and actor Bing Crosby. It was Crosby’s eighth long-playing album and sixth vinyl LP for Decca Records, originally released in 1957 as number DL-8575.

New Tricks featured twelve standards recorded between August 1955 and August 1956 for Crosby's daily CBS radio show with a trio led by Crosby's regular pianist Buddy Cole. They were mastered for LP release in March 1957.

Crosby's earlier Decca LP Some Fine Old Chestnuts (1954) similarly features songs recorded for radio accompanied by Cole.

The album was first issued on CD in 1990 by Decca in Japan No. 25P2 2833. In 1998 it was included in a twofer CD called "Some Fine Old Chestnuts & New Tricks" issued by MCA Records No. MCLD19377. Another CD issue took place in 2017 with the Universal Music release of New Tricks - 60th Anniversary Deluxe Edition catalog No. B0027587-02. This contained 12 bonus tracks, all of which were culled from Crosby's radio shows.

== Reception ==
Record producer, Ken Barnes, wrote: "While Bing broke no new ground with this album of oldies—accompanied by Buddy Cole’s trio—it was clearly something he enjoyed doing. The songs are all good—‘When I Take My Sugar to Tea’, ‘Avalon’, ‘Chicago’ and an outstanding ‘On the Alamo’ to name but four, and Bing puts it all across with great style. Cole plays his customary tasteful piano—his occasional excursions on to organ, however, only serve to point out how much better electronic organs sound today. This is a pity, because Cole had a considerable technique. Not a classic Crosby album by any means but a pleasant one, certainly.

The jazz historian Will Friedwald describes New Tricks as "swingingly successful," adding that "its cover - a very Bingish basset bearing a Crosby-style pipe, hat, and even eyes - had won listeners over even before they dug into the disc."

== Personnel ==
Buddy Cole (musician) (piano); Vince Terri (guitar); Don Whitaker (bass); Nick Fatool (drums)

== Track listing ==
Side one
No.	Title	Writer(s)	Length
1.	"When I Take My Sugar to Tea"	Sammy Fain, Irving Kahal, Pierre Norman	2:56
2.	"On the Alamo"	Isham Jones, Gus Kahn	2:54
3.	"I'm Confessin'"	Dan Dougherty, Ellis Reynolds, Al J. Neiburg	3:42
4.	"Between the Devil and the Deep Blue Sea"	Harold Arlen, Ted Koehler	2:01
5.	"Georgia on My Mind"	Hoagy Carmichael, Stuart Gorrell	3:21
6.	"Chicago"	Fred Fisher	2:03
Total length:			16:57

Side two
No.	Title	Writer(s)	Length
1.	"You're Driving Me Crazy"	Walter Donaldson	2:55
2.	"Avalon"	Al Jolson, Buddy DeSylva, Vincent Rose	1:42
3.	"Chinatown, My Chinatown"	William Jerome, Jean Schwartz	1:39
4.	"If I Could Be with You"	James P. Johnson, Henry Creamer	2:18
5.	"Softly, as in a Morning Sunrise"	Sigmund Romberg, Oscar Hammerstein II	3:22
6.	"Alabamy Bound"	Ray Henderson, Buddy DeSylva, Bud Green	1:54
Total length:			13:50

== Bonus tracks on New Tricks - 60th Anniversary Deluxe Edition ==
- Rain (Carey Morgan / Arthur Swanstrom / Eugene Ford)
- Church Bells (Paul Sanders)
- I'll Remember Today
- My How the Time Goes By (Cy Coleman / Carolyn Leigh)
- Chee Chee-Oo Chee (Sang the Little Bird)
- Surprise (Jay Livingston / Ray Evans)
- All the Time (Jay Livingston / Ray Evans)
- Gigi
- Tammy
- Big D (with Lindsay Crosby)
- Allegheny Moon (with Lindsay Crosby)
- More Than You Know
