= Hey Jude/Hey Bing! =

Studio album by Bing Crosby
- Released: February 1969
- Recorded: November 21, 25, 1968
- Studios: United Western Recorders, Hollywood, California
- Genre: Vocal
- Labels: Amos AAS 7001 (US); London SHU8391 (UK)
- Producer: Jimmy Bowen

Bing Crosby chronology
Bing Crosby's Treasury – The Songs I Love (1968)	Hey Jude/Hey Bing! (1969)	Goldilocks (1970)

Hey Jude/Hey Bing! is the thirty-sixth solo studio album by American singer and actor Bing Crosby for Amos Records at United Recorders Studio, Hollywood. The orchestra and chorus were conducted by Jimmy Bowen who also produced the album. Glen Hardin arranged tracks 4 and 6–10, Jimmie Haskell arranged tracks 2, 3 and 5 while Mike Post arranged track 1.

The album has never been issued on CD.

== Critical reception ==
The album received a positive critical reception upon its release. Cashbox magazine stated that "Perennial crooning favorite Bing Crosby steps into a contemporary bag here, and the results are delightful." The British publication Gramophone commented: "Bing Crosby has lost none of his mellow warmth of voice in Hey Jude, Hey Bing! as he gives us his versions of the Beatle ballad, 'Little Green Apples,' 'Both Sides Now,' and 'Those Were The Days,' thereby adding to the potency of the songs themselves."

== Track listing ==
Side one
No.	Title	Writer(s)	Length
1.	"Hey Jude"	John Lennon, Paul McCartney	3:51
2.	"Those Were the Days"	Gene Raskin	5:16
3.	"Both Sides, Now"	Joni Mitchell	3:08
4.	"The Straight Life"	Sonny Curtis	2:58
5.	"Little Green Apples"	Bobby Russell	3:19

Side two
No.	Title	Writer(s)	Length
1.	"Lonely Street"	Carl Belew, Kenny Sowder, W.S. Stevenson	2:33
2.	"It's All in the Game"	Charles Gates Dawes, Carl Sigman	3:42
3.	"Livin' on Lovin'"	Dave Burgess	2:42
4.	"More and More"	Tommy Karen, Rainey Robinson, Allan Reuss	2:30
5.	"Just for Tonight"	Baker Knight	2:08
