= Golden Records =

American children's music record label

- Founded: 1948
- Founder: Arthur Shimkin
- Status: Catalog currently owned by BMG Rights Management
- Distributor: Simon & Schuster (1948–57)
- Genre: Children's music
- Country of origin: U.S.
- Location: New York City
- Official website: www.littlegoldenrecords.com

Golden Records was a record label based in New York City. It was conceived and founded in 1948 by the Grammy Award-winning children's music producer Arthur Shimkin, then a new recruit in the S&S business department. Shimkin went on to found Sesame Street Records with Children's Television Workshop in 1970. Golden was one of the first children's music labels to combine story with melody. It featured music to accompany Little Golden Books. However, they were not the first instance of a published series that combined books and records. This distinction goes to Bubble Books, published between 1917 and 1922.

The label is mainly remembered for its children's music releases during the 1950s on a subsidiary label, Little Golden Records, which released singles rather than albums. As originally issued from 1948 to 1962, 78 r.p.m. Little Golden Records were six inches (15 cm) in diameter and made of bright yellow plastic (orange plastic was used for a few titles). Each side played for a maximum of about one minute and forty-five seconds at 78 rpm, a speed phased out for most records during the 1950s but a universal standard speed still included on nearly all record players throughout the 1960s. Early releases had illustrated paper labels; on later releases the label was printed directly onto the plastic. They were sold in colorfully illustrated sleeves that included a printed retail price: 25 cents on early sleeves, 29 cents on later ones and through to the end of the series. Many titles were also issued or re-issued as standard 7-inch 45 r.p.m. records. 7-inch EPs as well as 12-inch LPs were also issued.

The music included classic nursery rhymes, fairy tales, Christmas tunes & other holiday jingles, nature, Bible stories and an extensive collection of educational songs. Golden Records featured children's recordings by Bing Crosby, Rosemary Clooney, Danny Kaye, Kay Lande, Alfred Hitchcock, Johnny Cash, Captain Kangaroo, Art Carney, and many more.

Golden Records also issued educational records, such as A Golden Treasury of Poetry, a collection of classic poems read by Alexander Scourby, with commentary written by Louis Untermeyer.

In 2009, Micro Werks released two CDs of the Best of Golden Records. In 2011, Verse Music Group acquired the Golden Records catalog along with the rights to the Golden Records name and began preparations to reissue the catalog with the first batch of reissues in 2012. In 2015, Verse Music Group was acquired by BMG Rights Management; coincidentally, BMG's parent Bertelsmann owns Random House, the current distributor of Golden Books.

== Discography ==
=== Little Golden Records ===
==== 6-inch 78 r.p.m. yellow or orange records. Most titles also were available as 7-inch 45 r.p.m. records. ====
Title and Artist	Year	Cat. #
Scuffy the Tugboat/Good Morning—Gilbert Mack, Alec Wilder, Mitch Miller and Orchestra/Ireene Wicker - The Singing Lady, Gilbert Mack, Mitch Miller and Orchestra	1948	1
Hi-Ho, Hi-Ho/The Seven Dwarfs		D1
The Lively Little Rabbit/Farandale—Ireene Wicker - The Singing Lady, Gilbert Mack, Mitch Miller and Orchestra/Mitch Miller and Orchestra	1948	2
Whistle While You Work/Snow White In the Cottage		D2
The Shy Little Kitten/Tchaikowski's Humoresque—Ireene Wicker - The Singing Lady, Gilbert Mack, Mitch Miller and Orchestra/Mitch Miller and Orchestra	1948	3
Give a Little Whistle/Pinocchio and Jiminy Cricket		D3
Tootle/Grieg's Norwegian Dance—Ireene Wicker - The Singing Lady, Alec Wilder, Mitch Miller and Orchestra/Mitch Miller and Orchestra	1948	4
I've Got No Strings/Pinocchio, the Little Puppet		D4
The Poky Little Puppy/The Naughty Duck—Gilbert Mack, Mitch Miller and Orchestra/Ireene Wicker - The Singing Lady, Mitch Miller and Orchestra	1948	5
Mickey Mouse and His Friends/Pluto and His Phonograph	1948	D5
Circus Time: Big Top/Circus Time: Side Shows—Ireene Wicker - The Singing Lady, Mitch Miller and Orchestra	1948	6
Pluto, the Pup/Donald Duck's Singing Lessons—Michael Stewart, Mitch Miller and Orchestra/Peter Donald	1948	D6
The Funny Little Mouse/The Tall Giraffe—Ireene Wicker - The Singing Lady, Mitch Miller and Orchestra	1948	7
Mickey Mouse's New Car/Donald Duck at the Opera		D7
Wynken, Blynken and Nod/Storm in the Bathtub—Ireene Wicker - The Singing Lady, Mitch Miller and Orchestra	1948	8
Donald Duck, Baby Sitter/Mickey Mouse and Farmer Rush Rush		D8
Little Peewee/Turkish March—Ireene Wicker - The Singing Lady, Gilbert Mack, Mitch Miller and His Orchestra/Mitch Miller and Orchestra	1948	9
The Golden Egg/Beethoven's Country Dance—Ireene Wicker - The Singing Lady/Mitch Miller and Orchestra	1948	10
The Big Brown Bear/Schubert's Merry Music—Ireene Wicker - The Singing Lady, Gilbert Mack, Mitch Miller and Orchestra//Mitch Miller and Orchestra	1948	11
Out of the Window/The Busy Elevator—Ireene Wicker - The Singing Lady, Alec Wilder, Mitch Miller and Orchestra/Ireene Wicker - The Singing Lady, Mitch Miller and Orchestra	1948	12
Happy Birthday to You (2 versions)—voices of Snow White and the Seven Dwarfs, Pluto, Pinocchio/Mickey Mouse, Donald Duck, Cinderella and the Mice, accompanied by Mitch Miller and Orchestra	1950	RD12
The Animals of Farmer Jones/Schumann's Happy Farmer—Gilbert Mack, The Sandpipers, Mitch Miller and His Orchestra/Mitch Miller and His Orchestra	1948	R13
Five Little Firemen/Bach's Flute Dance—Anne Lloyd, Mitch Miller and His Orchestra/Mitch Miller and His Orchestra	1948	R14
The Taxi That Hurried/Children's Dance—Scotty MacGregor, Ireene Wicker - The Singing Lady, Gilbert Mack, Mitch Miller and Orchestra/Mitch Miller and Orchestra	1948	R15
Three Little Kittens/Pop! Goes the Weasel/Rain, Rain, Go Away—Anne Lloyd, Gilbert Mack, The Sandpipers, Mitch Miller and Orchestra/Anne Lloyd, Bob Miller, Mitch Miller and Orchestra	1949	R16
Oh, Susanna/Turkey in the Straw—Michael Stewart and The Sandpipers, Mitch Miller and Orchestra/The Sandpipers, Mitch Miller and Orchestra	1949	R17
The Farmer in the Dell/Sing a Song of Sixpence/Ten Little Indians—Anne Lloyd, The Sandpipers, Mitch Miller and Orchestra	1950	R18
Dixie/Yankee Doodle—The Sandpipers, Mitch Miller and Orchestra		R19
The Muffin Man/A Tisket, a Tasket/Hot Cross Buns/Pussycat, Pussycat—Anne Lloyd, The Sandpipers, Mitch Miller and His Orchestra	1949	R20
De Camptown Races/Clementine—Dick Byron, The Sandpipers, Mitch Miller and Orchestra/Anne Lloyd, The Sandpipers, Mitch Miller and His Orchestra	1948	R21
London Bridge/Did You Ever See a Lassie?/Baa, Baa, Black Sheep—The Sandpipers, Mitch Miller and Orchestra	1950	R22
Humpty Dumpty/Skip to My Lou/Jack and Jill/Cockadoodle Doo—The Sandpipers, Mitch Miller and Orchestra/Anne Lloyd, The Sandpipers, Mitch Miller and Orchestra	1950	R23
Old King Cole/Little Miss Muffet/Ring Around a Rosy/Pat-a-Cake—Michael Stewart and The Sandpipers, Mitch Miller and Orchestra/The Sandpipers, Mitch Miller and Orchestra	1949	R24
Old Macdonald Had a Farm/The Owl and the Pussycat—Gilbert Mack and The Sandpipers, Mitch Miller and Orchestra/Anne Lloyd, Mitch Miller and Orchestra	1950	R25
Three Blind Mice/Little Bo Peep/Little Jack Horner—Anne Lloyd, The Sandpipers, Mitch Miller and Orchestra/The Sandpipers, Mitch Miller and Orchestra		R26
The Barnyard/Round and Round the Village—Dick Byron, Gilbert Mack, Mitch Miller and Orchestra/The Sandpipers, Mitch Miller and Orchestra	1950	R27
Brahms' Lullaby/Rockabye, Baby/Twinkle, Twinkle Little Star—Anne Lloyd and The Sandpipers/Anne Lloyd, The Sandpipers, Mitch Miller and Orchestra	1949	R28
Little Toot (Part 1 and Part 2)—The Sandpipers, Mitch Miller and Orchestra	1950	RD28
Frog He Would a-Wooing Go/Bobby Shaftoe/Hickory, Dickory, Dock—Anne Lloyd, The Sandpipers, Mitch Miller and His Orchestra	1949	R29
O Come, All Ye Faithful/O Christmas Tree/Joy to the World—The Sandpiper Chorus, Directed by Mitchell Miller		LGR30
The Blue-Tail Fly/Big Rock Candy Mountain—Dick Byron, Michael Stewart, The Sandpipers, Mitch Miller and Orchestra/Michael Stewart and The Sandpipers, Mitch Miller and Orchestra	1950	R31
		R32
The Night Before Christmas (Part 1 and Part 2)—Peter Donald, Mitch Miller and Orchestra	1951	R33
Silent Night/It Came Upon a Midnight Clear—The Sandpiper Chorus, directed by Mitch Miller	1949	R34
Jingle Bells/Deck the Halls/Up On the Housetop—Dick Byron, The Sandpiper Chorus/Michael Stewart, The Sandpiper Chorus	1950	R35
Favorite Christmas Carols: God Rest Ye Merry, Gentlemen/Hark! The Herald Angels Sing—Ralph Nyland and the Sandpiper Chorus, directed by Mitch Miller/The Sandpiper Chorus, directed by Mitch Miller	1950	R36
O Little Town of Bethlehem/O Christmas Tree/Joy to the World—Bob Miller and the Sandpiper Chorus, directed by Mitch Miller/The Sandpiper Chorus, directed by Mitch Miller	1949	R37
O Come, All Ye Faithful/Away In a Manger—Full Chorus, Boys' Choir, and Orchestra, directed by Mitch Miller		R38
		R39
A Little Golden Sleepy Record (Close Your Eyes/Sleeping Child)—The Sandpipers, Anne Lloyd, Mitch Miller and Orchestra		R40
The White Bunny and His Magic Nose/Bunny Hop—The Sandpipers, Anne Lloyd, Gil Mack, Mitch Miller and Orchestra/Mitch Miller and Orchestra	1950	R41
Saggy Baggy Elephant/Elephant Walk—The Sandpipers, Anne Lloyd, Gil Mack, Danny Ocko, Mitch Miller and Orchestra	1950	R42
The Seven Sneezes/My Toothbrush Song—Anne Lloyd, Gil Mack, The Sandpipers, Mitch Miller and Orchestra/Anne Lloyd, The Sandpipers, Mitch Miller and Orchestra	1950	R43
The Magic Record/The Dancing Record—Anne Lloyd, The Sandpipers, Mitch Miller and Orchestra/The Sandpipers, Mitch Miller and Orchestra	1950	R44
Little Fat Policeman/The Safety Song—The Sandpipers, Mitch Miller and Orchestra	1950	R45
Brave Cowboy Bill (Side 1 and Side 2)—The Sandpipers, Gilbert Mack, Mitch Miller and Orchestra/Gilbert Mack, Mitch Miller and Orchestra	1950	R46
Santa Claus Is Comin' to Town/Christmas Song—The Sandpipers, Anne Lloyd, Mitch Miller and Orchestra	1951	R47
Sea Chanty/Sailing, Sailing/Sailor's Hornpipe—Michael Stewart, The Sandpipers, Mitch Miller and Orchestra/Dick Byron, The Sandpipers, Mitch Miller and Orchestra		R48
Over the Rainbow/Explosion Polka—Anne Lloyd, Mitch Miller and Orchestra/Mitch Miller and Orchestra	1950	R49
We're Off to See the Wizard—Anne Lloyd, Mitch Miller and Orchestra/Mitch Miller and Orchestra		R50
Doctor Dan, the Bandage Man/Billy Boy—Anne Lloyd, Dick Byron, Mitch Miller and His Orchestra/Anne Lloyd, The Sandpipers, Mitch Miller and His Orchestra		R51
Timmy Is a Big Boy Now/The Three Bears—Anne Lloyd, Dick Byron, Mitch Miller and Orchestra/Anne Lloyd, The Sandpipers, Mitch Miller and His Orchestra		R52
Poor Mr. Flibberty-Jib (with a Rumble in His Head)/The Noise Song—Anne Lloyd, Gilbert Mack, Dick Byron, The Sandpipers, Mitch Miller and Orchestra		R53
The Happy Man and His Dump Truck/Bumpity Bumpity Dump Truck/Haydn's The Happy Man's Dance—Anne Lloyd, Dick Byron, Mitch Miller and Orchestra/Mitch Miller and Orchestra		R54
Scuffy the Tugboat/My Bonnie Lies Over the Ocean—Mike Stewart, Gilbert Mack, The Sandpipers, Mitch Miller and Orchestra		R55
Tootle/Choo Choo Train—Pat O'Malley, Mitch Miller and Orchestra/The Sandpipers, Anne Lloyd, Mitch Miller and Orchestra		R56
Peter Cottontail (Easter version and Year-round version)—Anne Lloyd, The Sandpipers, Mitch Miller and Orchestra	1951	R57
The Woody Woodpecker Song/Woodpecker's Dance—The Sandpipers, Mitch Miller and Orchestra/Mitch Miller and Orchestra		R58
Little Lulu/Lavender's Blue—Anne Lloyd, The Sandpipers, Mitch Miller and Orchestra/Audrey Marsh, Mitch Miller and Orchestra		R59
I'm Popeye the Sailor Man/Blow the Man Down—Jack Mercer (voice of Popeye), The Sandpipers, Mitch Miller and Orchestra/The Sandpipers, Mitch Miller and Orchestra		R60
Casper the Friendly Ghost/The Little Ghost's Dance—Anne Lloyd, The Sandpipers, Mitch Miller and Orchestra/Mitch Miller and Orchestra		R61
Winnie-the-Pooh: Sing Ho For the Life of a Bear/Cottleston Pie—Anne Lloyd, The Sandpipers, Mitch Miller and Orchestra/The Sandpipers, Mitch Miller and Orchestra		R62
		R63
		R64
March from Peter and the Wolf/Jing-a-ling, Jing-a-ling		R65
Icka-Backa-Soda-Cracker/Come to the Barn Dance—Anne Lloyd, Dick Byron, Mitch Miller and Orchestra/Ralph Nyland, Gilbert Mack, The Sandpipers, Mitch Miller and Orchestra		R66
Tarzan Song/Jungle Dance—The Sandpipers, Mitch Miller and Orchestra/Mitch Miller and Orchestra		R67
Rudolph the Red Nosed Reindeer/The Reindeer's Dance—Alec Wilder, Mitch Miller and Orchestra/Michael Stewart, The Sandpipers, Mitch Miller and Orchestra		R68
Frosty the Snow Man (Part 1/Part 2) -- -- The Sandpipers, Mitch Miller and Orchestra/Pat O'Malley, The Sandpipers, Mitch Miller and Orchestra	1951	R69
Little Audrey Says/Let's Go Shopping—Mae Questal, The Sandpipers, Mitch Miller and Orchestra/Anne Lloyd, Mitch Miller and Orchestra		R70
Parade of the Wooden Soldiers/Sparrow in the Treetop—Betty Clooney, Anne Lloyd, The Sandpipers, Mitch Miller and Orchestra		R71
Alexander's Ragtime Band—Anne Lloyd, The Sandpiper Singers, Mitch Miller and Orchestra		R72
		R73
Daddy's Whistle/The Chocolate Cowboy—Sally Sweetland, Mitch Miller and Orchestra/Dick Byron, Mitch Miller and Orchestra	1951	R74
Easter Parade (Part 1 and Part 2) -- -- Peter Hanley, Mitch Miller and Orchestra/The Sandpiper Chorus, Mitch Miller and Orchestra		R75
Ukelele and Her New Doll (Part One and Part Two)—Cecelia Scott (narrator)		R76
Tawny Scrawny Lion (Part I and Part II)—Anne Lloyd, Mike Stewart, The Sandpipers, Mitch Miller and Orchestra	1952	R77
		R78
My Country, 'Tis of Thee/The Star Spangled Banner—The Sandpiper Chorus, Mitch Miller and Orchestra		R79
Egbert the Easter Egg/Bunny Bunny Bunny—Betty Clooney, The Sandpipers, Mitch Miller and Orchestra/The Sandpipers, Mitch Miller and Orchestra	1950	R80
Songs About the Woodwinds: Antionette, the Clarinet/Bobo, the Oboe/Knute, the Flute/Muldoon, the Old Bassoon—Anne Lloyd, The Sandpipers, Mitch Miller and Orchestra		S81
Jimmy Durante Sings		R82
Oh! How I Hate to Get Up in the Morning/I Don't Want to Go to Bed—Michael Stewart, Dick Byron, Bob Miller, Ralph Nyland, Mitch Miller and Orchestra/Anne Lloyd, Michael Stewart, Mitch Miller and Orchestra		R83
God Bless America (two versions)—Peter Hanley, The Sandpiper Chorus, Mitch Miller and Orchestra/The Sandpiper Chorus and Orchestra		R84
Mr. Shortsleeves' Supermarket/Stop, Look and Listen!—The Sandpipers, Mitch Miller and Orchestra	1951	R85
Willie the Whistling Giraffe/The Poky Little Puppy—Anne Lloyd, Sandpiper Singers, Mitch Miller and Orchestra		R86
Down by the Station/The Little Train Who Said 'Ah Choo!' -- Anne Lloyd, The Sandpiper Singers, Mitch Miller and Orchestra		R87
When Santa Gets Your Letter (Part I and Part II)—Anne Lloyd, Michael Stewart, The Sandpipers, Mitch Miller and Orchestra		R88
Tom Corbett, Space Cadet Song and March (Tom Corbett Space Academy Song/Tom Corbett Space Cadet March)—Space Cadet Chorus and Orchestra conducted by Mitch Miller	1951	R89
Fuzzy Wuzzy (Wuz a Bear)/The Sleepy Bear's Dance/Riddle Song—Betty Clooney, Anne Lloyd, The Sandpipers, Mitch Miller and Orchestra	1952	R90
Dennis the Menace (Part I and Part II)—Bobby Nick, The Sandpipers, Mitch Miller and Orchestra		R91
From Gilbert & Sullivan's HMS Pinafore (I'm Called Little Buttercup/We Sail the Ocean Blue)—Anne Lloyd, Mitch Miller and Orchestra/The Sandpipers, Mitch Miller and Orchestra		R92
Smokey the Bear (Part 1 and Part 2)—The Sandpipers, Mitch Miller and Orchestra	1952	R93
Bert Parks Sings: You're a Grand Old Flag/I'm a Yankee Doodle Dandy—Bert Parks, Mitch Miller and Orchestra	1951	S94
Gandy Dancers' Ball/Hambone—The Sandpipers, Anne Lloyd, Mitch Miller and Orchestra		R95
Shrimp Boats/On Top of Old Smoky—The Sandpipers, Sally Sweetland, Mitch Miller and Orchestra/The Sandpipers, Anne Lloyd, Mitch Miller and Orchestra		R96
Pull Together/Santa's Other Reindeer—The Sandpipers, Mitch Miller and Orchestra	1952	R97
Introducing Rootie Kazootie/The Polka Dottie Polka—Naomi Lewis, The Original Voices from The Rootie Kazootie Club TV show, Mitch Miller and Orchestra	1952	R98
Yankee Doodle Bunny, the Holiday Bunny/I Like People, the Friendly Song—Jimmy Durante, The Sandpipers, Mitch Miller and Orchestra/Jimmy Durante, Mitch Miller and Orchestra		sR99
Rodgers and Hammersten's Songs for Children from The King and I: I Whistle a Happy Tune/Getting to Know You—Anne Lloyd, Robert Miller, The Sandpipers, Mitch Miller and Orchestra/Sally Sweetland, The Sandpipers, Mitch Miller and Orchestra		S100
On the Good Ship Lollipop/Riddle Song—Anne Lloyd, The Sandpiper Singers, Mitch Miller and Orchestra/Anne Lloyd, Pat O'Malley, Mitch Miller and Orchestra		R101
I'm Gonna Get Well Today/Bumble Bee Bumble Bye—Anne Lloyd, The Sandpiper Singers, Mitch Miller and Orchestra		R102
White Christmas (two versions)—Peter Hanley, The Sandpipers, Mitch Miller and Orchestra/Barbara Gussow, David Anderson, Mitch Miller and Orchestra		R103
When the Red Red Robin Comes Bob Bob Bobbin' Along/Walkin' to Missouri—Anne Lloyd, The Sandpipers, Mitch Miller and Orchestra		sR104
Paper Doll/Paper Family—Anne Lloyd, The Sandpipers, Mitch Miller and Orchestra		R105
Songs from South Pacific: Happy Talk/Dites Moi—Anne Lloyd, The Sandpipers, Mitch Miller and Orchestra		S106
Take Me Out to the Ball Game—Anne Lloyd, The Sandpipers, Mitch Miller and Orchestra	1952	R107
Take Me Out to the Ball Game/The Umpire/Casey at the Bat—The Singing Voices of Phil Rizzuto, Tommy Henrich, Ralph Branca, and Roy Campanella, with Anne Lloyd, The Sandpipers, Mitch Miller and Orchestra/Mel Allen	1952	S107
Me and My Shadow/Ski-Da-Me-Rink-A-Doo—Bert Parks, The Sandpipers, Mitch Miller and Orchestra/Bert Parks, Anne Lloyd, The Sandpipers, Mitch Miller and Orchestra		sR108
Rootie Kazootie in Polka Dottie's Garden: Polka Dottie's Garden (story)/Polka Dottie's Garden (song)—Naomi Lewis, Frank Milano, Mitch Miller and Orchestra		R109
I Saw Mommy Kissing Santa Claus/Christmas Chopsticks—Anne Lloyd, The Sandpipers, Mitch Miller and Orchestra	1953	R110
Songs about the Army, Airforce, Navy, Marines: Anchors Aweigh/Halls Of Montezuma/Caissons Go Rolling Along/Army Air Corps Song—The Sandpipers, Mitch Miller and Orchestra		111
Crackerjack Christmas/The Night Before Christmas Song—Anne Lloyd, The Sandpipers, Mitch Miller and Orchestra/Jack Arthur, Anne Lloyd, The Sandpipers, Mitch Miller and Orchestra	1953	R112
Me and My Teddy Bear/Teddy Bears On Parade—Jack Arthur, The Sandpiper Singers, Mitch Miller and Orchestra		R113
		R114
Circus Day - The Man on the Flying Trapeze (Part 1 and Part 2)—Dick Byron, Ralph Nyland, Michael Stewart, Bob Miller, Mitch Miller and Orchestra		R115
Tweet and Toot (Part I and Part II)—Anne Lloyd, Michael Stewart, Mitch Miller and Orchestra/Mitch Miller and Orchestra		R116
Ta-Ra-Ra-Boom-Der-E/Pony Boy—Anne Lloyd, Sally Sweetland, Ralph Nyland, Mitch Miller and Orchestra/Anne Lloyd, Mitch Miller and Orchestra		R117
Mac Namarra's Band (vocal on Side A, instrumental on Side B)—Ralph Nyland, The Sandpipers, Anne Lloyd, Sally Sweetland, Mitch Miller and Orchestra/Mitch Miller and Orchestra		R118
Singin' In the Rain/Let's All Sing Like the Birdies Sing—Anne Lloyd, The Sandpipers, Mitch Miller and Orchestra		R119
There's a Rainbow 'Round My Shoulder/Inky Dinky Bob-O-Linki—Anne Lloyd, Mitch Miller and Orchestra	1953	R120
The World Owes Me a Living (Part I and Part II)—Anne Lloyd, The Sandpipers, Mitch Miller and Orchestra/Anne Lloyd, Gilbert Mack, Mitch Miller and Orchestra	1953	R121
		R122
		R123
The Little Rag Doll with Shoe Button Eyes/The Lollipop Tree—Anne Lloyd, The Sandpiper Quartet, Mitch Miller and Orchestra		R124
Sleigh Ride/I Just Can't Wait Till Christmas—The Sandpipers, Mitch Miller and Orchestra/Anne Lloyd, The Sandpipers, Mitch Miller and Orchestra		R125
The Syncopated Clock/Clock Symphony—Anne Lloyd, Mike Stewart, The Sandpipers, Mitch Miller and Orchestra/Mitch Miller and Orchestra		R126
Hop Scotch Polka/Music, Music, Music —Anne Lloyd, The Sandpipers, Mitch Miller and Orchestra		R127
Songs about the Brass: Monsieur Forlorn The French Horn, Crumpet The Trumpet, Mcmalone The Slide Trombone, Poobah, The Tuba—The Sandpipers, Mitch Miller and Orchestra		S128
		R129
From Samuel Goldwyn's Production - Hans Christian Andersen - Thumbelina/Wonderful Copenhagen—Anne Lloyd, The Sandpipers, Mitch Miller and Orchestra	1953	R130
Rootie Kazootie and Mr. Deetle Dootle: Mister Deetle Dootle Song/Rootie Kazootie—Naomi Lewis, Mitch Miller and Orchestra/Naomi Lewis, Frank Milano, Mitch Miller and Orchestra		R131
Playmates/Tattle Tale Duck—Anne Lloyd, The Sandpipers, Mitch Miller and Orchestra		R132
Three Little Fishies/The Music Goes 'Round and Around—Anne Lloyd, The Sandpipers, Mitch Miller and Orchestra		R133
Daddy's Report Card/Daddies (What Does Your Daddy Do?)—Mary Jane Sutherland, Anne Lloyd, Jimmy Leyden, Ralph Nyland, Mitch Miller and Orchestra		R134
Pig Polka/Crazy Quilt Farm—The Sandpiper Chorus, Mitch Miller and Orchestra		R135
		R136
My Bunny and My Sister Sue/Polly-Wolly-Doodle—Anne Lloyd, Jimmy Carroll & Orchestra/The Sandpiper Quartet, Jimmy Carroll & Orchestra		R137
Little Joe Worm, Son of Glow Worm/Mr. Tap Toe—The Sandpiper Quartet, Jimmy Carroll & Orchestra/Anne Lloyd, Jimmy Carroll & Orchestra		R138
Animal Playtime (songs: Bling Blang Build a House for Baby/Pick It Up/Mailman/Don't You Push Me Down)—Uncle Win Stracke, Anne Lloyd, The Sandpipers, Mitch Miller and Orchestra		R139
		R140
Four Hymns (Now the Day Is Over/Onward Christian Soldiers/Jesus Wants Me for a Sunbeam/Jesus Loves Me)—The Golden Choir directed by Mitch Miller		R141
Songs from Mary Rodgers' Some of My Best Friends Are Children (Finders Keepers/Allee In Free/The Woodchuck Song/Kick the Can Willie!)—Anne Lloyd, The Sandpiper Quartet, Mitch Miller and Orchestra	1953	R142
Jelly On My Head/I Wish I Wuz A Whisker/Flippety, Floppety Bunny/Pee Wee the Bunny with the Big Blue Eyes—Mary Jane Sutherland, The Sandpipers, Mitch Miller and Orchestra		S143
The Little Engine that Could (Part I and Part II)—Anne Lloyd, The Sandpipers, Mitch Miller and Orchestra		S144
How Much Is That Doggie in the Window/Three Little Puppies—Anne Lloyd, The Sandpipers, Mitch Miller & Orchestra/Anne Lloyd, Michael Stewart, The Sandpipers, Mitch Miller & Orchestra		R145
Eustace, the Useless Rabbit/The Animals' Dance—Anne Lloyd, Mike Stewart, Mitch Miller & Orchestra/Anne Lloyd, The Sandpipers, Mitch Miller & Orchestra	1953	R146
Arfy, The Doggie In the Window/Mairzy Doats—Anne Lloyd, The Sandpipers, Mitch Miller and Orchestra	1953	R147
		R148
Rootie Kazootie and Gala Poochie Pup—Naomi Lewis, Frank Milano, Mitch Miller and Orchestra		R149
		R150
Hansel and Gretel—Susan Douglas, Mitch Miller and Orchestra	1954	R151
Heidi/Gaston and Josephine—read by Susan Douglas. Music Director: Mitch Miller	1954	R152
The Saggy Baggy Elephant—Mitch Miller and Orchestra		R153
The Poky Little Puppy—Frank Milano		R154
I Dreamt That I Was Santa Claus/I Want a Hippopotamus for Christmas—Anne Lloyd, Mitch Miller and Orchestra	1953	R155
Little Red Riding Hood		R156
Three Bedtime Stories—told by Kari		R157
Songs About the Strings: Lucy Lynn The Violin, Mellow Fellow The Cello, Nola The Viola, Lovelace The Bass--—Anne Lloyd, Michael Stewart, Mitch Miller and Orchestra/Anne Lloyd, Ralph Nyland, Mitch Miller and Orchestra		S157
Baby's Mother Goose—Kari		R158
I Taut I Taw a Puddy-Tat (Part 1 and Part 2)—Anne Lloyd with the original voices of Bugs Bunny, Sylvester and Tweetie Pie, accompanied by Mitch Miller and Orchestra		R159
The Little Red Caboose—Kari		R160
Nursery Songs—Kari		R161
Chicken Little—Kari		R162
Jack and the Beanstalk (Part 1 and Part 2)—Jack Lazare and Anne Lloyd	1956	R163
The Big Bell and the Little Bell/Easter Mornin' -- Tex Stewart, Billy, The Westerners, Mitch Miller and Orchestra	1956	S163
The Gingerbread Man (Part 1 and Part 2)—Rita Golden and Ed Powell		R164
Rumplestiltskin/The Princess and the Pea—Rita Golden		R165
Little Fir Tree/Where Did My Snow Man Go?—Anne Lloyd, Mary Jane Sutherland, Mike Stewart, The Sandpipers, Mitch Miller and Orchestra		R166
The Little Stowaway On Santa's Sleigh/That's What I Want For Christmas —Mary Jane Sutherland, The Sandpipers, Mitch Miller and Orchestra/Anne Lloyd, Mike Stewart, The Sandpipers, Mitch Miller and Orchestra		R167
Johnny Appleseed: Pioneer Song/Apple Song—Anne Lloyd, Mike Stewart, The Sandpipers, Mitch Miller and Orchestra		D168
		R169
		R170
		R171
		R172
		R173
		R174
		R175
Happy Trails to You/A Cowboy Needs a Horse—Roy Rogers and Dale Evans/Roy Rogers and Chorus		R176
		R177
		R178
The Lord Is Counting on You/Open Up Your Heart and Let the Sunshine In—Dale Evans and Roy Rogers with Chorus	1955	R179
Bugs Bunny (Part I and Part II)—The Sandpipers, Mitch Miller and Orchestra, Voice of Bugs Bunny	1955	R180
		R181
		R182
Roy Rogers and Dale Evans sing: The Night Before Christmas (Part I and Part II) (to the melody of On Top of Old Smoky)—Roy Rogers, Dale Evans, Mitch Miller and Orchestra	1955	R183
Annie Oakley sings: The Annie Oakley Song/Bright Eyed and Bushy Tailed—Annie Oakley, Mitch Miller and Orchestra	1955	R184
Roy Rogers sings: Swedish Rhapsody/Bamboo Boat—Roy Rogers, The Ranch Hands, Mitch Miller and Orchestra	1955	R185
The Daffy Duck Song: Daffy Duck (Part I and Part II)—The Sandpipers, Mitch Miller and Orchestra	1955	R186
Daniel the Cocker Spaniel/Chicki Wicki Choctaw—Roy Rogers, The Sandpipers, Mitch Miller and Orchestra/Dale Evans, The Ranch Hands, Mitch Miller and Orchestra		R187
From Walt Disney's At the Country Fair: Donald Duck on the Ferris Wheel/ Goofy in the Fun House/Chip 'N' Dale on the Roller Coaster/Pinocchio on the Merry-Go-Round—The Sandpipers, Mitch Miller and Orchestra		D188
Elmer Fudd (Part I and Part II)—The Original Voices, The Sandpipers, Mitch Miller and Orchestra		R189
Lady/He's a Tramp—Anne Lloyd, Michael Stewart, Sally Sweetland, The Sandpipers, Mitch Miller and Orchestra/Anne Lloyd, Mitch Miller and Orchestra		R190
		R191
Easter Is A Loving Time/Candy Cane Cake Walk—Roy Rogers, Dale Evans, The Sandpipers, Mitch Miller and Orchestra		R192
		R193
Disneyland/When You Wish Upon a Star—The Sandpipers, Mitch Miller and Orchestra	1955	D194
		R195
The Little Shoemaker/The Happy Wanderer—The Sandpipers, Mitch Miller and Orchestra		R196
		R197
The Little Boy Who Couldn't Find Christmas/The Story of Christmas—Roy Rogers and Dale Evans, The Ranch Hands, Mitch Miller and Orchestra		R198
The Chuck Wagon Song/Roy Rogers Had a Ranch—The Sandpipers, Various	1955	R199
Mister Sandman/The Mama Doll Song—Anne Lloyd, The Sandpipers		R200
		R201
A Good Night Prayer/Keep In Touch—Roy Rogers and The Sons of the Pioneers/Dale Evans and The Sons of the Pioneers		BB202
I Saw Mommy Do the Mambo (with You Know Who)/Kiddygeddin—Anne Lloyd, The Sandpipers, Mitch Miller and Orchestra		R202
Come and Get It/Hoofbeat Serenade—Roy Rogers and The Sons of the Pioneers		BB203
Sylvester the Cat/Sylvester the Cat's Nine Lives—The Sandpipers, Mitch Miller and Orchestra		R203
Ko Ko Mo/Tweedle Dee—Anne Lloyd, The Sandpipers, Mitch Miller and Orchestra		R204
Goodnight Prayer		R205
Porky Pig (Part I and Part II)—The Sandpipers, Mitch Miller and Orchestra		R206
		R207
		R208
Foghorn Leghorn and Henery Hawk		R209
Cinderella		R210
Happy Birthday		R211
A Howdy Doody Record: Look for the Bright Side/Little One, Lean One, Long One, Lickpot, Thumbo—Howdy Doody and the Gang, Mitch Miller and Orchestra/Buffalo Bob, Mitch Miller and Orchestra	1955	R212
Be Sure You're Right/Old Betsy—Jimmie Dodd and The Frontier Men		R213
The Siamese Cat Song/Bella Notte—Anne Lloyd, Sally Sweetland, Mitch Miller and Orchestra/The Paesanos, Mitch Miller and Orchestra		D214
Yosemite Sam		R215
The Berry Tree/Hey Mr. Banjo—The Sandpipers, Mitch Miller and Orchestra	1955	R216
Farmer Al Falfa/Mighty Mouse—The Terrytooners, Mitch Miller and Orchestra	1955	R217
From Paul Terry's Barker Bill TV Show: Barker Bill/Step Right Up—The Terrytooners, Mitch Miller and Orchestra	1955	R218
A Howdy Doody Record: Look! Look!/Will My Dog Be Proud of Me?—Buffalo Bob and the Gang, Mitch Miller and Orchestra/Howdy Doody, Buffalo Bob, Captain Scuttlebutt and the Gang, Mitch Miller and Orchestra	1955	R219
A Howdy Doody Record: The Laughing Song/John J. Fedoozle—Buffalo Bob, The Princess and the Gang, Mitch Miller and Orchestra/John J. Fedoozle and the Gang, Mitch Miller and Orchestra	1955	R220
A Howdy Doody Record: Cowabunga/Big Chief—Chief Thunderthud, The Princess, Mitch Miller and Orchestra	1955	R221
Official Mickey Mouse Club Song/Official Mickey Mouse Club March—Jimmy Dodd, The Merry Mouseketeers/Donald Duck, Jiminy Cricket, Mickey Mouse, The Merry Mouseketeers		R222
		R223
		R224
		R225
Champion the Wonder Horse—Mike Stewart, The Sandpipers, Mitch Miller and Orchestra	1955	R226
”Ten Gallon Hat/I Gotta Crow”—Annie Oakley, The Sandpipers, Mitch Miller and Orchestra	1954	R227
		R228
		R229
		R230
Buffalo Bill, Jr. (Part 1 and Part II)—The Sandpipers, Mitch Miller and Orchestra		R231
		R232
		R233
		R234
		R235
		R236
		R237
Chitty Chitty Bang Bang (Part 1 and Part 2)—as told by Joel Crager		R238
Oklahoma! (Part I and Part II)—The Sandpiper Chorus, Mitch Miller and Orchestra/Mitch Miller and Orchestra		R239
The Lord's Prayer/Ave Maria—Roy Rogers/Dale Evans		R240
The Bible Tells Me So/Have You Read Your Bible Today?—Roy Rogers & Dale Evans and The Ranch Hands		R241
The Yellow Rose of Texas/(My Heart Goes) Piddily Patter Patter—The Sandpiper Chorus and Orchestra		R242
My First Alphabet Song/My First Counting Song—The Sandpipers, Mitch Miller and Orchestra		R243
The Surrey with the Fringe On Top (Vocal on Side A/Instrumental on Side B)—The Sandpipers, Mitch Miller and Orchestra/Mitch Miller and Orchestra		R244
		R245
Jesus Loves the Little Children/The Lord Is Gonna Take Good Care of You—Roy Rogers & Dale Evans		R246
		R247
The Traffic Light Song—Anne Lloyd, Annie Oakley, The Sandpiper Chorus, Mitch Miller and Orchestra		R248
Bugs Bunny, Railroad Engineer/Yosemite Sam, Hold-Up Man—The Original Voices, The Sandpipers, Mitch Miller and Orchestra		R249
Cowboy Daffy Duck	1954	R250
		R251
		R252
		R253
		R254
Roy Rogers and Dale Evans Sing		R255
		R256
Tubby the Tuba—William Bell, Mitch Miller and Orchestra	1956	R257
		R258
		R259
		R260
A Howdy Doody Record: Charles Dickens' A Christmas Carol (Part 1 and Part 2)—Howdy Doody, Dilly Dally, Captain Scuttlebutt, Mitch Miller and Orchestra		R261
16 Tons/Bonnie Blue Gal—The Sandpipers, Mitch Miller and Orchestra		R262
Welcome to Romper Room		R263
Romper Room: The Do Bee Song		R264
Romper Room: Singing Games		R265
Romper Room: Nursery Songs		R266
Romper Room: Learn About the Farm Songs		R267
Romper Room Sing Along Songs		R268
Hansel and Gretel (Part I and Part II)—Mike Stewart, Bob Miller, Ralph Nyland, Dick Byron, Anne Lloyd, Mitch Miller and Orchestra		GL269
Baby's First Song		R270
		R271
Lullaby Time (Twinkle, Twinkle Little Star/Rock A Bye, Baby/Now I Lay Me Down To Sleep)—The Sandpipers, Mitch Miller and Orchestra/Anne Lloyd, The Sandpipers, Mitch Miller and Orchestra		GL272
Nursery Songs: Ring Around the Rosy/Skip To My Lou/Round And Round The Village—The Sandpipers, Mitch Miller and Orchestra		R273
The Three Bears (Part I and Part II)—Mike Stewart, Anne Lloyd, Mitch Miller and Orchestra/The Sandpipers, Mitch Miller and Orchestra		R274
		R275
I'm Gonna Get Well Today/Dr. Sniffleswiper—The Sandpipers, Mitch Miller and Orchestra		R276
On Top of Old Smokey/Pony Boy—Anne Lloyd, The Sandpipers, Mitch Miller and Orchestra		R277
		R278
School Days (Part 1 and Part 2)—The Sandpipers, Mitch Miller and Orchestra		R279
		R280
		R281
		R282
		R283
From Prokofieff's Peter and the Wolf: March from Peter and the Wolf/The Story of Peter and the Wolf—Mitch Miller and Orchestra/Mike Stewart, Gil Mack, The Sandpipers, Mitch Miller and Orchestra		GL284
A Little Golden Record Greeting: Happy Birthday to You (Part I and Part II)—The Sandpipers, Mitch Miller and Orchestra. (The record has space on the label on which to write "To:" and "From:" names. Issued with pink/white labels and with blue/white labels.)		R285
Tommy and Jimmy Dorsey Play for Children		R286
The Most Happy Fella (excerpt from Act 1 Scene II of The Most Happy Fella)/The Happy Whistler—Tony and Ensemble, The Sandpipers, Mitch Miller and Orchestra/The Sandpipers, Mitch Miller and Orchestra		R287
Little Child/Will You Come for a Walk with Me?—Anne Lloyd, Mike Stewart, The Sandpipers, Mitch Miller and Orchestra/Anne Lloyd, The Sandpipers, Mitch Miller and Orchestra		R288
		R289
I'm Gettin' Nuttin' for Christmas/Wishy Washy Wish—Billy Quinn, The Sandpipers, Mitch Miller and Orchestra/Dickie Beals, The Sandpipers, Mitch Miller and Orchestra	1956	R290
		R291
		R292
		R293
Hooray for Cowboys/Whoever Heard Of a Cowardly Cowboy?—Arthur Norman Singers		R294
Circus Boy Theme Song: Circus Boy (Part I and Part II)—The Sandpipers, Mitch Miller and Orchestra		R295
		R296
Jack and the Beanstalk/March of the Ill-Assorted Guards—The Sandpipers, Mitch Miller and Orchestra		R297
Train Songs: I've Been Working On the Railroad/Down by the Station—Anne Lloyd, The Sandpipers, Mitch Miller and Orchestra		GL298
		R299
		R300
Walt Disney's Song of Frontierland (Part I and Part II)—Full Chorus and Orchestra		D301
		R302
		R303
A Little Golden Record Greeting: The Story of the Magi in Story and Song: The Story of the Magi (song), The Gift of the Magi (story) ---- Anne Lloyd, The Sandpipers, Mitch Miller and Orchestra/Mike Stewart, The Sandpipers, Mitch Miller and Orchestra		R304
A Merry, Merry, Merry, Merry Christmas/A Happy Little New Year—Anne Lloyd, The Sandpipers, Mitch Miller and Orchestra		R305
		R306
Four Hymns (Now the Day Is Over/Onward Christian Soldiers/Jesus Wants Me for a Sunbeam/Jesus Loves Me)—The Golden Choir directed by Mitch Miller		R307
		R308
O Come All Ye Faithful/O Christmas Tree/Joy to the World—Boys' Choir, The Sandpiper Chorus and Orchestra, directed by Mitch Miller		R309
		R310
		R311
Thank You God/Let There Be Peace On Earth—Roy Rogers and Dale Evans, The Ranch Hands, Mitch Miller and Orchestra		R312
Speedy Gonzales		R313
Warner Bros. Looney Tunes and Merrie Melodies: Merry Melodies (Part I and Part II)—Bugs Bunny, Sylvester, Henry Hawk and the Others, The Sandpipers, Mitch Miller and Orchestra		R314
		R315
Rock Island Line/Hot Diggity (Dog Ziggity Boom)—Jimmy Leyden, The Sandpipers, Jimmy Carroll and Orchestra/The Sandpipers, Jimmy Carroll and Orchestra	1956	R316
		R317
		R318
		R319
		R320
		R321
		R322
		R323
		R324
		R325
		R326
		R327
		R328
		R329
		R330
		R331
		R332
		R333
		R334
		R335
		R336
(I Wish I Had a Dog Like) Rin Tin Tin/I Love Dogs—The Sandpipers, Mitch Miller and Orchestra		R337
From The Wizard of Oz: Over the Rainbow/We're Off to See the Wizard—Anne Lloyd, The Sandpipers, Mitch Miller and Orchestra/The Sandpipers, Mitch Miller and Orchestra		R338
From Bing Crosby's Ali Baba and the 40 Thieves 40: Ali Baba and the 40 Thieves 40 (The Story)/They All Lived Happily Ever After—Bing Crosby/Bing Crosby, Chorus and Orchestra		R339
		R340
Little Dog/A Dog Is a Man's Best Friend —The Sandpipers, Mitch Miller and Orchestra		R341
		R342
Song of the Sparrow/O The Train Goes, in the Middle of the House -- -- Mary Lou Bell, The Sandpipers, Jimmy Carroll and Orchestra/Peter Marshall, Tommy Farrell, Jimmy Carroll and Orchestra		R343
		R344
		R345
I'm Popeye the Sailor Man/Scuffy the Tugboat—Jack Mercer, The Sandpipers, Mitch Miller and Orchestra/Mike Stewart, Gilbert Mack, The Sandpipers, Mitch Miller and Orchestra		R346
		R347
Mickey Mouse Club Thoughts for the Day—Jimmie Dodd		R348
Rin Tin Tin Songs: Rinny, Rusty and Rip/101st Calvary Gallop (Song of the Fighting Blue Devils)—Anne Lloyd, The Sandpipers, Mitch Miller and Orchestra/The Sandpipers, Mitch Miller and Orchestra		R349
Bing Crosby Sings Daniel Boone Song-Story: Indian Adventure: An Incident At Rogers Creek Part I/Indian Adventure: An Incident At Rogers Creek Part II—Bing Crosby with Chorus and Orchestra		R350
		R351
		R352
		R353
		R354
Emperor's New Clothes (The Story)/Never Be Afraid—Bing Crosby with Chorus and Orchestra		R355
		R356
The Life and Legend of Wyatt Earp: Wyatt Earp Theme Song/Saga of Billy the Kid—The Sandpipers, Mitch Miller and Orchestra		R357
		R358
		R359
		R360
		R361
Cindy, Oh! Cindy/Mama From the Train (a Kiss, a Kiss)—The Sandpipers, Mitch Miller and Orchestra	1956	R362
London Bridge/Three Blind Mice—Ralph Nyland, Anne Lloyd, The Sandpipers, Mitch Miller and Orchestra/Anne Lloyd, The Sandpipers, Mitch Miller and Orchestra		R363
Bing Crosby Sings Mother Goose		R364
Little White Duck/When The Red Red Robin Comes Bob Bob Bobbin' Along—Anne Lloyd, The Sandpipers, Mitch Miller and Orchestra		R365
Daffy Duck		R366
		R367
		R368
		R369
Rin Tin Tin Songs: A Dog's Best Friend/Cold Nose, Warm Heart—Dennis Ballabia, Anne Lloyd, The Sandpipers, Mitch Miller and Orchestra		R370
How Lovely Is Christmas (solo version and choral version)—Bing Crosby/Chorus	1957	R371
Moses Little Moses/Moses and His People—Arthur Norman Chorus, Mitch Miller and Orchestra		R372
		R373
Happy Birthday To You (Part 1 and Part 2)—The Sandpipers, Mitch Miller and Orchestra	1957	R374
Just Walking in the Rain/The Banana Boat Song—The Sandpipers, Jimmy Carroll and Orchestra	1957	R375
Marianne/Jamaica Farewell—Jimmy Leyden, Jimmy Carroll and His Orchestra/Barry Frank, Jimmy Carroll and His Orchestra	1957	R376
Round and Round/The Music Goes Round and Round—Russ Vincent, The Sandpipers, Mitch Miller and Orchestra/Pat O'Mally, Anne Lloyd, The Sandpipers, Mitch Miller and Orchestra		R377
		R378
		R379
The Old Chisolm Trail/The Red River Valley—Roy Rogers and the Ranch Hands with Mitch Miller and Orchestra/Dale Evans and the Ranch Hands with Mitch Miller and Orchestra		R380
Roy Rogers Had a Ranch/Home On the Range—Pat Brady, The Ranch Hands, Mitch Miller and Orchestra/Dale Evans, The Ranch Hands, Mitch Miller and Orchestra		R381
O Little Town of Bethlehem/Hark! The Herald Angels Sing—Full Chorus, Boys' Choir, Mitch Miller and Orchestra		R382
		R383
		R384
Captain Kangaroo/Little Kangaroo Dance—Bob Keeshan, The Sandpipers, Mitch Miller and Orchestra/The Sandpipers, Mitch Miller and Orchestra		R385
Boy at the Window/An Axe, an Apple and a Buckskin Jacket—Bing Crosby/Bing Crosby and Betty Mulliner		R386
		R387
		R388
		R389
		R390
Play Songs from Mother Goose (Sing a Song of Sixpence/Little Bo Peep/Humpty Dumpty)—The Sandpipers, Mitch Miller and Orchestra		R391
		R392
		R393
		R394
Old King Cole/Sing a Song of Sixpence—Bing Crosby and Chorus		R395
Star Light, Star Bright/Little Boy Blue—Bing Crosby and Chorus		R396
Songs We Sing in Nursery School (All Work Together/Pick It Up/Put Your Finger In the Air/Pretty and Shiny O/Little Seed)—Uncle Win Straeke, Mitch Miller and Orchestra		R397
		R398
		R399
		R400
		R401
		R402
		R403
		R404
		R405
		R406
		R407
		R408
		R409
		R410
		R411
		R412
		R413
		R414
		R415
I've Been Working on the Railroad/Down by the Station—Anne Lloyd, The Sandpiper Singers, Mitch Miller and Orchestra		R416
Dixie/The Yellow Rose of Texas—The Sandpipers, Mitch Miller and Orchestra/The Sandpiper Chorus and Orchestra		R417
On Top of Old Smokey		R418
Battle Hymn of the Republic/Onward Christian Soldiers—Golden Choir directed by Mitch Miller		R419
Pop! Goes the Weasel/Ring Around the Rosy/Oh, Susanna—Michael Stewart, The Sandpipers, Mitch Miller and Orchestra		R420
The Farmer in the Dell/Old Macdonald Had a Farm—Anne Lloyd, The Sandpipers, Mitch Miller and Orchestra/Gilbert Mac, Anne Lloyd, The Sandpipers, Mitch Miller and Orchestra		R421
Old King Cole/Little Bo Peep/Sing a Song of Sixpence/Jack and Jill—Michael Stewart, Anne Lloyd, The Sandpipers, Mitch Miller and Orchestra/Anne Lloyd, The Sandpipers, Mitch Miller and Orchestra		R422
		R423
Prokofieff's Peter and The Wolf Song and Story/Hansel And Gretel Song And Story—Gilbert Mack, Michael Stewart, Mitch Miller and Orchestra/Anne Lloyd, Ralph Nyland, Bob Miller, Mitch Miller and Orchestra		R424
Skip to My Lou/Round & Round the Village/Did You Ever See A Lassie?—Anne Lloyd, The Sandpipers, Mitch Miller and Orchestra/Anne Lloyd, Ralph Nyland, Mitch Miller and Orchestra		R425
		R426
Jingle Bells/Deck the Halls/Up on the Housetop—Dick Byron and The Sandpiper Chorus, directed by Mitch Miller		R427
		R428
		R429
		R430
		R431
		R432
		R433
		R434
		R435
		R436
		R437
Heckle and Jeckle (Part 1 and Part 2)—Roy Halee, The Sandpipers, Mitch Miller and Orchestra		R438
Brahms' Lullaby/Rockabye, Baby/Twinkle, Twinkle Little Star—Anne Lloyd and The Sandpipers/Anne Lloyd, The Sandpipers, Mitch Miller and Orchestra	1950	R439
Fury Theme Song/What Did You Do Before You Had TV?—The Sandpipers, Mitch Miller and Orchestra	1957	R440
De Camptown Races/Clementine—Dick Byron, The Sandpipers, Mitch Miller and Orchestra/Anne Lloyd, The Sandpipers, Mitch Miller and Orchestra		R441
		R442
		R443
		R444
		R445
		R446
		R447
		R448
		R449
From TV's Adventures of Lassie: Lassie Theme Song/Lassie, My Four Footed Friend—The Sandpipers, Mitch Miller and Orchestra		R450
Gandy Dancers' Ball/Shrimp Boats—The Sandpipers, Anne Lloyd, Mitch Miller and Orchestra/The Sandpipers, Sally Sweetland, Mitch Miller and Orchestra		R451
Some Day My Prince Will Come (Part 1 and Part 2)—The Sandpipers, Mitch Miller and Orchestra		R452
Emperor's New Clothes (the story)/Never Be Afraid—Bing Crosby, Chorus and Orchestra		R453
Zorro (Part 1 and Part 2)—The Sandpipers, Mitch Miller and Orchestra		R454
The Life and Legend of Wyatt Earp: Wyatt Earp (Theme Song)/Saga of Billy the Kid—The Sandpipers, Mitch Miller and Orchestra		R455
Lassie Theme Song/Lassie, My Four Footed Friend—The Sandpipers, Mitch Miller and Orchestra		R456
Polly-Wolly-Doodle/Lavender's Blue—The Sandpiper Quartet, Jimmy Carroll and Orchestra/Audrey Marsh, Mitch Miller and Orchestra		R457
Brahams' Lullaby/Rockabye, Baby/Twinkle, Twinkle Little Star—Anne Lloyd, The Sandpipers, Mitch Miller and Orchestra		R458
		R459
Clementine/De Camptown Races		R460
		R461
		R462
Around the World/Teddy Bear—The Sandpipers, Jimmy Carroll and Orchestra/Barry Frank, Jimmy Carroll and Orchestra		R463
		R464
		R465
		R466
		R467
		R468
		R469
I Love Lassie/Lassie Is My Best Friend—The Arthur Norman Chorus		R470
Toyland/March of the Toys—Captain Kangaroo, Mr. Greenjeans, and The Sandpipers		R471
Merry Melodies		R472
I Love a Parade/I Went to the Animal Fair—Captain Kangaroo, Mr. Greenjeans, The Sandpipers	1958	R473
		R474
		R475
		R476
		R477
Kittens and Cats		R478
From Walt Disney's Sleeping Beauty: I Wonder (Part 1 and Part 2)		R479
From Walt Disney's Sleeping Beauty: Once Upon a Dream (Part 1 and Part 2)		R480
From Walt Disney's Sleeping Beauty: Hail to Princess Aurora (Part 1 and Part 2)		R481
From Walt Disney's Sleeping Beauty: Sing a Smiling Song (Part 1 and Part 2)		R482
From Walt Disney's Sleeping Beauty: Skumps/The Story of the Two Kings—Chorus and Orchestra/Darlene Gillespie		R483
		R484
		R485
Sleeping Beauty - story/Sleeping Beauty - song—Darlene & Orchestra/Darlene & Chorus		R486
		R487
		R488
		R489
		R490
		R491
		R492
The Woody Woodpecker Song		R493
Volare!/Little Star—Dorothy with Ed Cee and Orchestra		R494
Wagon Train/Square Dance—The Sandpipers, Mitch Miller and Orchestra		R495
Walt Disney's John Slaughter (Part 1 and Part 1)—The Sandpipers, Jimmy Carroll & Orchestra		R496
Smokey the Bear (Part 1 and Part 2)—The Sandpipers, Mitch Miller and Orchestra	1952	R497
Maverick! (Part 1 and Part 2)—The Sandpipers, Jimmy Carroll and Orchestra		R498
Casey Jones/John Henry—Win Stracke and Arthur Norman Orchestra and Chorus		R499
Captain Kangaroo and Mr. Green Jeans Sing: Button Up Your Overcoat/The Bear Went Over the Mountain—Captain Kangaroo (Bob Keeshan) and Mr. Green Jeans (Lumpy Brannum), Jimmy Carroll & Orchestra		R500
Lazy Bones!/Small Fry!—Hoagy Carmichael with the Arthur Norman Orchestra		R501
The Lone Ranger Introduces: I Ride an Old Paint/The Railroad Corral—Arthur Norman Chorus & Orchestra		R502
The Nine Lives of Elfego Baca: Elfego Baca (Part I)/Elfego Baca (Part II)—The Sandpipers, Jimmy Carroll & Orchestra		R503
		R504
		R505
		R506
		R507
		R508
		R509
Tales of Wells Fargo/Lonely Rider—The Sandpipers, Mitch Miller and Orchestra		R510
		R511
		R512
		R513
		R514
		R515
Catch a Falling Star/Strauss Explosion Polka—The Sandpipers, Mitch Miller and Orchestra/Mitch Miller and Orchestra		R516
		R517
Leave It to Beaver Theme Music (Toy Parade I/Toy Parade II)—Arthur Norman Orchestra and Chorus		R518
Mickey Mouse Theme Song		R519
		R520
		R521
The Lone Ranger Theme/Hi-Yo Silver!—The Arthur Norman Singers		R522
		R523
		R524
		R525
Lollipop		R526
		R527
		R528
		R529
		R530
From Walt Disney's Tonka: The Theme Song (Part 1)/Tomahawk War Dance—Wayne Sherwood, The Sandpipers, Jimmy Carroll and Orchestra/Jimmy Carroll and Orchestra		R531
Tom Thumb		R532
April Showers/In the Good Old Summertime—Bob Keeshan (Captain Kangaroo), The Sandpipers, Jimmy Carroll and Orchestra		R533
Hank Ketcham's Dennis the Menace: Dennis the Menace (Part 1 and Part 2)—Bobby Nick, The Sandpipers, Mitch Miller and Orchestra		R534
Golden Bed Time Songs: Now I Lay Me Down to Sleep/Cuddle Down—Anne Lloyd, The Sandpipers, Mitch Miller and Orchestra/Arthur Norman Chorus		R535
The Animals of Farmer Jones/Barnyard Song—Gilbert Mack, The Sandpipers, Mitch Miller and His Orchestra/Mitch Miller and His Orchestra		R536
		R537
		R538
		R539
		R540
		R541
		R542
		R543
		R544
The Children's Marching Song (also known as This Old Man, Nick Nack Paddy Whack)(Side 1: The Song/Side 2: The March)—The Sandpiper Children's Chorus/Jimmy Carroll's Fife and Drum Corps	1959	R545
Little Space Girl/The Roly-Poly Man In the Moon—Miss Moonbeam and Mr. Jet, Jimmy Carroll Orchestra/Mike Stewart and The Sandpipers, Mitch Miller Orchestra		R546
		R547
Disney's Shaggy Dog	1959	R548
Kris Kringle (Part 1 and Part 2) —Original Chipmunks Chip and Dale with Clarice	1959	R549
Huckleberry Hound T.V. Theme Song/Yogi Bear T.V. Theme Song—Jimmy Carroll Orchestra	1958	R550
The Atcheson, Topeka and the Santa Fe/I Like the Sound of a Train—Art Malvin, The Sandpipers, Jimmy Carroll and Orchestra/Wayne Sherwood, Jimmy Carroll and Orchestra		R551
Animal Crackers In My Soup/Lovely Bunch of Coconuts—The Sandpipers, Jimmy Carroll and Orchestra		R552
Captain Kangaroo and Mr. Green Jeans sing: Johnny One-Note/Waltzing Mathilda—Captain Kangaroo (Bob Keeshan), Mr. Green Jeans (Lumpy Brannon), Jimmy Carroll and Orchestra		R553
Swanee River/My Old Kentucky Home		R554
Aren't You Glad You're You?/Tiki-Tiki-Timbo—Shari Lewis, Jimmy Carroll and Orchestra, with Lan O'Kun		R555
Where, Oh Where Has My Little Dog Gone?/The Pussycat Song (Nyow! Nyot Nyow!) —The Sandpipers, Jimmy Carroll and Orchestra		R556
Hi-Lili, Hi-Lo/Swingin' On a Star—Shari Lewis, Jimmy Carroll and Orchestra, with Lan O'Kun	1959	R557
Ruff and Ready/Professor Gizmo—voiced by Don Messick		R558
All I Want for Christmas Is My Two Front Teeth!/I Gotta Cold for Christmas—The Three Stooges and The Music Wreckers		R559
Sleigh Ride/When Santa Claus Gets Your Letter—Captain Kangaroo and Mr. Green Jeans, Jimmy Carroll and Orchestra		R560
		R561
		R562
		R563
		R564
		R565
		R566
		R567
		R568
		R569
		R570
		R571
Me and My Teddy Bear/Parade of the Wooden Soldiers—Jack Arthur, The Sandpiper Singers, Mitch Miller and Orchestra/Anne Lloyd, The Sandpipers, Mitch Miller and Orchestra		R572
Playmates/Put Your Finger In the Air—The Sandpipers, Mitch Miller and Orchestra/Win Stracke, Mitch Miller and Orchestra		R573
The Little Fat Policeman		R574
		R575
		R576
La Plume De Ma Tante/Frere Jacques—Les Enfantes D'Or and Jimmy Carroll Orchestra		R577
The Horse In Striped Pajamas/Happy Hands—Captain Kangaroo, Mr. Green Jeans, Jimmy Carroll Orchestra		R578
Tom Terrific/Mighty Manfred—Lionell Wilson, Don Elliott, Skip Jacks	1960	R579
77 Sunset Strip—Don Elliott, Skip Jacks (Knocks by Sam)		R580
Scarlet Ribbons (For Her Hair)/Billy Boy—Don Elliott and the Lullaby Singers, The Sandpipers, Mitch Miller and Orchestra		R581
Tom Terrific and Friends		R582
Deep in the Heart of Texas/Rockin' Horse Cowboy—The Campfire Singers, Directed by Jimmy Carroll/Don Elliott and The Skip Jacks		R583
		R584
Swamp Fox Theme Song (Part 1 and Part 2)—The Peedee River Boys with Orchestra and Chorus directed by Jimmy Carroll		R585
The Three Stooges Come to Your House and Make a Record: We're Coming to Your House (On Top of Old Smokey)/We're Cutting a Record—The Three Stooges (Moe, Larry, Curly), The Music Wreckers		R586
Never Pick a Fight With Popeye/Help! Help!—Jack Mercer (voice of Popeye), Mae Questal (voice of Olive Oyl), The Sea Weed Singers, Jimmy Carroll Orchestra		R587
Little Sir Echo/Bobby Shaftoe/Hickory Dickory Dock —Anne Lloyd, Ralph Nyland, The Sandpipers, Mitch Miller and Orchestra/Anne Lloyd, The Sandpipers, Mitch Miller and Orchestra		R588
That's Quick Draw McGraw/Baba Looey—Don Elliott, Gil Mack, and The Cartoon-Cowboys, with Jimmy Carroll Orchestra		R589
Tramp, Tramp, Tramp		R590
Huckleberry Hound presents: Boo Boo Bear/Mr. Jinx—Video Cartoon Voices, Jimmy Carroll & Orchestra	1959	R591
Yogi Bear Introduces Loopy De Loop/Let's Have a Song, Yogi Bear!—Sascha Burland, Don Elliott, and Orchestra Directed by Jimmy Carroll	1960	R592
Quick Draw McGraw as El Kabong: El Kabong/Ouch! Ouch!—Gil Mack and the Cartoon-Cowboys with Jimmy Carroll Orchestra/Don Elliott and the Cartoon-Cowboys with Jimmy Carroll Orchestra		R593
		R594
		R595
		R596
Miss Frances Presents Ding Dong School Sing-Along Songs: We Sail the Ocean Blue/Anchors Aweigh—The Sandpiper Singers and Orchestra		R597
Rally Round the Flag Boys/Bonnie Blue Flag—Win Stracke; Male Chorus; Banjo, Fife, Drum & Bugle Corps, directed by Jimmy Carroll		R598
		R599
High Hopes/Eatin' Goober Peas—Don Elliott and The Skip Jacks	1959	R600
		R601
		R602
Hank Ketcham's Dennis the Menace Songs: The Dennis The Menace Theme/Ka-Pow! Ka-Pow! Ka-Pow!—Philip Fox, Jimmy Carroll Orchestra	1960	R603
		R604
Donald Duck Theme Song/Around the World—The Original Voice of Donald Duck		R605
Songs From Shirley Temple Movies: On The Good Ship Lollipop/Early Bird—Anne Lloyd, The Sandpipers, Mitch Miller and Orchestra/The Golden Children's Chorus, Jimmy Carroll and Orchestra	1960	R606
The Happy Wanderer/Polly Wolly Doodle—The Sandpipers, Mitch Miller and Orchestra/The Golden Children's Chorus, Jimmy Carroll and Orchestra	1959	R607
Miss Frances Presents Ding Dong School Singing Games—Miss Frances and the Sandpiper Singers, Mitch Miller and Orchestra, and Jimmy Carroll	1959	R608
Walt Disney's Pollyanna: The Pollyanna Song/America the Beautiful—Nathalie Foss, Jimmy Carroll Orchestra/The Sandpiper Singers, Jimmy Carroll Orchestra	1960	R609
Huckleberry Hound presents: Pixie and Dixie/Iddy Biddy Buddy—Gilbert Mack, Jimmy Carroll and Orchestra	1959	R610
		R611
The Sound of Music: Do-Re-Mi/Alouette—The Golden Children's Chorus	1959	R612
Battle Hymn of the Republic/ When Johnny Comes Marching Home—Win Stracke with Chorus and Orchestra directed by Jimmy Carroll	1959	R613
Zip-A-Dee Doo-Dah/Laughin' Place—The Sandpipers, Mitch Miller and Orchestra/Art Carney, Mitch Miller and Orchestra		R614
Sing-Along Songs: I'm a Little Teapot/Polly Put the Kettle On—Mae Questal (voice of Olive Oyl), Jack Mercer (voice of Popeye), Jimmy Carroll Orchestra/The Glow-Tones, Jim Timmens and Orchestra	1960	R615
Winter Wonderland/Mr. Snow—The Golden Sandpipers, Jimmy Carroll Orchestra		R616
Little Drummer Boy/The Children's Christmas Carol—Stella Stevens and The Golden Orchestra		R617
The Twelve Days of Christmas (Part 1 and Part 2)—The Golden Chorus and Orchestra		R618
		R619
		R620
		R621
Wreck the Halls with Boughs of Holly/Jingle Bells—The Three Stooges with Orchestra		R622
		R623
		R624
Quick Draw McGraw presents: Snuffles/Auggie Doggie—Jimmy Carroll Orchestra and The Golden Tones		R625
Hank Ketcham's Dennis The Menace Songs: I'm Home!/I Hate Spelling!—Philip Fox, Jimmy Carroll Orchestra		R626
		R627
Cinderella, a Bedtime Story-Song—Kurt Knudsen		R628
Danny Kaye Tells the Story of the Big Oven		R629
Romper Room Do Bee Songs (Part 1 and Part 2)—The Sandpipers, Mitch Miller and Orchestra		R630
Romper Room Sing Along Songs (Will You Come and Play/Clapping and Stamping/See Me Jump/Tippy Tip Toe/Hop Up, Hop Down/Marching to My Drum)—The Sandpipers, Mitch Miller and Orchestra	1961	R631
King Leonardo Theme Song/Odie-O-Colognie—Jackson Beck/Allen Swift		R632
Oh Susanna/Turkey In the Straw—Michael Stewart, The Sandpipers, Mitch Miller and Orchestra	1960	R633
Little Red Riding Hood (Part 1 and Part 2)—Kurt Knudsen		R634
Our Gang: The Mischief Makers sing: Hip Hip Hooray!/Here We Are Together—The Mischief Makers	1960	R635
Ballad of the Alamo (Part I and Part II)—Michael Stewart, The Sons of Texas		R636
		R637
		R638
		R639
		R640
		R641
		R642
Yogi Bear Presents Cindy Bear/Snooper & Blabber—Jimmy Carroll Orchestra and the Golden Tones	1960	R643
Walt Disney's Swiss Family Robinson Movie Theme: My Heart Was an Island (Part 1 and Part II)—The Sandpipers, Jimmy Carroll Orchestra (Note: This record's sleeve incorrectly states the title as: My Heart Is An Island)		R644
Song from the movie Pepe: Pepe (Part I and Part II)—The Sandpipers, Frank Milano, Jimmy Carroll Orchestra		R645
Quick Draw's a-Comin'		R646
Casanova Yogi Bear and Cutie Cindi Bear: Songs of the Cave Set: The Casanova Of The Cave Set/The Cutie Of The Cave Set—Frank Milano		R647
Walt Disney's Absent Minded Professor: Serendipity/The Absent Minded Professor's March—Frank Milano and the Sandpipers/The Sandpipers		R648
Merry Christmas from Hank Ketcham's Dennis the Menace: When Christmas Comes Around Each Year/That's What I Want For Christmas—Philip Fox		R649
A Hap-Hap-Happy Christmas from Yogi Bear: Have A Hap-Hap-Happy Christmas/Give A Goody For Christmas—Frank Milano		R650
		R651
		R652
		R653
		R654
		R655
I Saw a Ship A Sailing/Rub-A-Dub-Dub, Three Men In A Tub—The London Rhymers and Players		R656
Twinkles and His Pals		R657
Bugs Bunny: What's Up Doc> (Part 1 and Part 2)—Original Cartoon Voices, The Sandpipers, Mitch Miller Orchestra		R658
Rocky and His Friends: I'm Rocky's Pal/I Was Born to Be Airborne		R659
Huckleberry Hound presents: Hokey Wolf and Ding-a-Ling/A Wolf's Work is Never Done—Frank Milano	1961	R660
Walt Disney's Babes In Toyland: Toyland March/I Can't Do the Sum—Sandpiper Chorus and Orchestra conducted by Jim Timmens		R661
March of the Toys/Workshop Song—The Golden Orchestra conducted by Jim Timmens/Sandpiper Chorus and Orchestra conducted by Jim Timmens		R662
Yogi Bear TV Theme Song/Before Yogi—Golden Chorus and Orchestra/Frank Milano	1961	R663
Popeye: Songs of Health		R664
Quick Draw McGraw's Pals: Super Snooper/Blabber Mouse—Original Cartoon Voices with Jimmy Carroll's Orchestra		R665
The Fox and the Grapes (Part 1 and Part 2)—Kurt Knudsen		R666
		R667
		R668
		R669
		R670
Hi-Diddle-Dee-Dee/Hi-Diddle-Dee-Dee (Story)—Annie Lloyd, The Sandpipers, Mitch Miller and Orchestra		R671
		R672
Mother Goose Songs: Pease Porridge Hot/Little Tommy Tucker/The Queen of Hearts—London Rhymers and Players		R673
Huck, Yogi & Quick Draw Safety Song: We Three Believe In Safety (Part I and Part 2)—Frank Milano		R674
		R675
		R676
		R677
Four Mother Goose Songs		R678
Two Songs from Winnie-the-Pooh: Sing Ho for the Life of a Bear/Cottleston Pie—Anne Lloyd, The Sandpipers, Mitch Miller and Orchestra		R679
Songs from the Flintstones: Meet the Flintstones/Rise and Shine—Original TV Voices	1961	R680
Larry Harmon's TV Bozo, The World's Most Famous Clown (I Like People/Wowee)—Bozo the Clown		R681
The Little Engine That Could (Part 1 and Part 2)—Anne Lloyd, The Sandpipers, Mitch Miller and Orchestra		R682
		R683
		R684
		R685
		R686
Popeye Songs of Safety: Red and Green/Never Play with Matches—Jack Mercer (voice of Popeye), Mae Questal (voice of Olive Oyl)		R687
		R688
Top Cat (theme song "The Most Effectual Top Cat" - Part 1 and Part 2)—Golden Orchestra and Chorus, directed by Jim Timmens	1962	R689
		R690
		R691
		R692
		R693
		R694
		R695
		R696
Hans Christian Andersen's The Ugly Duckling (Part 1 and Part 2)—Art Carney, Mitch Miller and Orchestra		R697
Larry Harmon's TV Bozo and His Magic Whistle: Belinda's Rainy Day/Magic Whistle		R698
Woody Woodpecker March/Andy Pandy Polka -- -- The Golden Tones, Jimmy Carroll's Orchestra/Jimmy Carroll's Orchestra		R699
TV Theme Songs of Touché Turtle and Dum Dum (Touche Turtle/Dum Dum)—Jim Timmens' Orchestra	1962	R700
Wally Gator/Lippy the Lion and Hardy Har Har (TV cartoon theme songs)—Jim Timmens' Orchestra		R701
The Poky Little Puppy/Lambert, the Sheepish Lion—The Sandpipers, Mitch Miller's Orchestra		R702
Songs About Words: Alpha-Beetle/Rattlesnake—The Sandpipers, Jim Timmens and Orchestra	1962	R703
Casper, the Friendly Ghost/Little Audrey Says—The Sandpipers, Mitch Miller and Orchestra/Mae Questal, The Sandpipers, Mitch Miller and Orchestra		R704
		R705
Songs About Counting: 99 Eyes/1 Happy Family—The Sandpipers, Jim Timmens' Orchestra		R706
Saggy Baggy Elephant/The Mixed-Up Zoo—The Sandpipers, Mitch Miller and Orchestra/The Sandpipers, Jim Timmens' Orchestra		R707
Mister Ed Theme Song/Pretty Little Filly—Golden Orchestra and Chorus, directed by Jim Timmens	1962	R708
		R709
		R710
		R711
The Princess and the Pea		R712
Paper Doll/The Paper Family—The Sandpipers, Mitch Miller and Orchestra		R713
The Little Train That Said Ah-Choo		R714
The Cat and the Fiddle/One, Two, Buckle My Shoe/Simple Simon—The London Rhymers and Players	1962	R715
Five Songs of Mother Goose: Doctor Fell/Goosey, Goosey Gander/Dickery, Dickery Dare/See Saw, Marjorie Daw/Ride a Cock Horse—The London Rhymers and Players	1962	R716
From the movie The Music Man: 76 Trombones (Part 1 and Part 2)—The Golden Orchestra and Chorus		R717
		R718
		R719
The Jetsons Theme Song and Eep Oop Ork	1962	R720
Heigh-Ho, Heigh-Ho (from Snow White and the Seven Dwarfs)—The Sandpipers, Mitch Miller and Orchestra		R721
A Little Golden Sing-A-Long: Funiculi, Funicula/Loch Lomond—The Glow-Tones, Jim Timmens and Orchestra		R722
Superman/Tarzan Song—The Video Singers/The Sandpipers, Mitch Miller and Orchestra		R723
The Circus On Parade (Part 1 and Part 2), from Jumbo—The Sandpipers		R724
Romper Room Physical Fitness (The Posture Basket Song/Bend and Stretch)—as seen on the Romper Room TV show		R725
Song from the movie Gay Purr-ee: Little Drops of Rain/My Bonnie Lies Over the Ocean—Janet Eden, The Golden Orchestra/The Sandpipers, Mitch Miller and Orchestra		R726
Songs from The Wizard of Oz: Over the Rainbow/We're Off to See the Wizard—The Sandpipers, Mitch Miller and Orchestra		R727
Fuzzy Wuzzy (Wuz a Bear)		R728
Thumbelina/Tom Thumb (story)—The Sandpipers Directed by Mitch Miller/Frank Milano		R729
Hansel and Gretel (story)/Hansel and Gretel (music only)—Mike Stewart, Anne Lloyd, Bob Miller, Ralph Nyland, Dick Byron, Mitch Miller and Orchestra/Mitch Miller and Orchestra		R730
A Christmas Song		R731
Here We Go 'Round the Mulberry Bush/Here We Go Loop De Loop—The Sandpipers and The Golden Orchestra		R732
Blow the Man Down/Sailing, Sailing and Sailor's Hornpipe—The Sandpipers, Mitch Miller and Orchestra/Dick Byron, Mitch Miller and Orchestra		R733
Favorite Folk Songs: On Top of Old Smoky/Old Dan Tucker—Anne Lloyd, The Sandpipers, Mitch Miller and Orchestra/Win Stracke, Mitch Miller and Orchestra		R734
Songs of Bozo		R735
Golden Funny Songs (John Jacob Jingleheimer Schmidt; The Thousand Legged Worm; The Grasshopper Song; A Peanut Sat On A Railroad Track; I Love You; Be Kind To Your Web-footed Friends)—The Sandpipers, Jimmy Carroll and Orchestra		R736
Instruments of the Orchestra: Antionette the Clarinet/Lucy Lynn the Violin/Crumpet the Trumpet/Peter Percussion—Golden Orchestra, directed by Mitch Miller		R737
My Pony, Macaroni (Part 1 and Part 2)—The Sandpipers, Jim Timmens and Orchestra		R738
The Flintstones: Dino the Dino (Part 1 and Part 2)—The Original TV Voices	1963	R739
The Flintstones: Pebbles Lullaby (Part 1 and Part 2—Alan Reed, Jim Timmens and Orchestra	1963	R740
		R741
		R742
		R743
		R744
		R745
The Ugly Duckling		R746
Lavender's Blue/Polly Wolly Doodle—The Sandpipers/The Golden Kids		R747
Laurel and Hardy		R748
		R749
		R750
		R751
This Little Pig/30 Days Hath September/As I Was Going to St. Ives/2 Cats of Kilkenny/There Was a Maid/The Little Bird—The Golden Orchestra		R752
Puff the Magic Dragon—The Golden Singers and Orchestra Conducted by Jim Timmens	1963	R753
		R754
Songs of the Jetsons featuring Jane Jetson and daughter, Judy: Push Button Blues & Rama Rama Zoom		R755
Bugs Bunny		R756
		R757
		R758
The Sword in the Stone	1963	R759
		R760
		R761
		R762
The Elephant Record (Here Come the Elephants/The Elephant Hop)—Roger Price, Jeff Harris, Fay DeWitt, Kenny Adams, Sheila Copelan/Kenny Adams	1963	R763
My Favorite Martian	1963	R764
Songs of the Singing Nun: Dominique/I Go My Merry Way (Tous Les Chemins)—Susan Stein (voice and guitar); songs translated from French to English by Noel Regney; songs written and originally performed by Jeanne-Paule Marie "Jeannine" Deckers, better known as Soeur Sourire ("Sister Smile") and also The Singing Nun	1963	R765
The Voice of President John F. Kennedy, A Memorial Record (Highlight of Nomination Acceptance Speech July 15, 1960/The Oath of Office January 20, 1961/Highlight of the Inaugural Address Washington, D. C. January 20, 1961)—John F. Kennedy	1963	R766
Brahms' Lullaby		R767
The Campaign Songs of Bill Hanna & Joe Barbera's Magilla Gorilla & Yogi Bear: Magilla for President/Yogi for President	1963	R768
		R769
		R770
		R771
A Merry Merry Merry Merry Christmas/A Happy Little New Year—The Sandpipers, directed by Mitch Miller	1963	R772
How to Tell Time (Part 1 and Part 2)—Told by Kari		R773
The Official Romper Room Do Bee Dance/10 Little Men		R774
The Saturday Matinee Chorus Sings Songs from My Fair Lady		R775
Astro Boy: Theme Song/Astro Boy: Whistle and March—The Cosmic Rangers	1964	R776
Row, Row, Row Your Boat—Captain Kangaroo		R777
		R778
		R779
		R780
		R781
Winnie-the-Pooh		R782

== See also ==
- Cricket Records
- Kid Stuff Records
- Parachute Records
- Peter Pan Records
