= Pinos (disambiguation) =

Pinós is a village and municipality in Catalonia, Spain.

Pinos may also refer to:

- El Pinós or Pinoso, a town near the Alicante/Murcia border, Spain
- Mount Pinos, a mountain in California, US
- Isla de Pinos, former name of the Cuban island Isla de la Juventud
  - Battle of Pinos, a naval engagement
- Pinos, Zacatecas, a town in Mexico
- Pinos Municipality, the municipality containing the town of Pinos, Zacatecas
- Pinos volcanic complex, extinct volcanic complex in the Pinos Municipality, Zacatecas
- Rio de los Pinos, a river in Colorado and New Mexico, U.S.

== See also ==
- Jorge Pinos (born 1989), Ecuadorian footballer
- Los Pinos (disambiguation)
- Pino (disambiguation)
