= Cuban folk music =

Cuban folk music includes a variety of traditional folk music of Cuba, and has been influenced by the Spanish and the African culture as well as the remaining indigenous population of the Caribbean.

== Classification of genres ==
During the 1960s, a methodological organization was consistently applied to the Cuban popular music; and that methodology, called of the "generic complexes" was mainly based on the works of Cuban musicologist Argeliers León. In his book Del canto y el tiempo, León divided the study of Cuban popular music in several sections presented in the following order: Música yoruba, Música bantú, Música abakuá, Música guajira, El son, La rumba, La guaracha, La canción y el bolero, Música instrumental, De la contradanza al danzón, al chachachá and Hacia el presente, en el presente.

Dr. Olavo Alén says about the "generic complex system": "In his book Música Folklórica Cubana as well as in his opus masterpiece Del canto y el tiempo, he (León) shows us a panoramic view of our music departing fundamentally from the description of the original genres of Cuba. But those divisions proposed by Argeliers didn't pretend to be as rigorous as a scientific organization that would be in compliance with the classificatory principles of coherence, exclusivity, exhaustivity and most importantly, dichotomy."

According to the Cuban popular music "Generic complex theory", Cuban folk music is classified as follows:

- Punto cubano Complex, with its variations Punto libre y Punto fijo.
- Rumba Complex, with its components Yambú, Guaguancó, Columbia, Conga and Comparsa.
- Danzón Complex, with its variants Contradanza, Danzón, Danzonete, Mambo and Cha-cha-chá.
- Son Complex, with its modalities Changüí, Sucu-sucu and Guaracha.
- Canción Complex, with its variants Bolero and Filin.

The "Generic complex theory" has been refuted since long time ago by renowned musicologists such as Leonardo Acosta, which explains in his article titled "About the Generic Complexes and other matters":

Fortunately, the theology [sic.] of the generic complexes has been viewed with skepticism within the musicology circles from various countries, including Cuba, where some musicologists have oscillated between rejection, skepticism and depise…

According to Cuban composer and musicographist Armando Rodríguez Ruidíaz:

Autochthonous Cuban popular music is indeed similar to a macroorganism in which all its components descend from a common origin and are related, in one way or another, through its entire evolutionary process, which is shown as the development of a formal and stylistic primeval prototype; the common ancestor of all posterior generic forms… …the Spanish song-dances of sesquiáltera (hemiola) rhythm were the primeval starting point of the evolutionary process from which numerous Iberic-American autochthonous styles departed. The structure of those songs, which included its couplet-refrain as well as its hemiola rhythm from African origin, was replicated and modified in the American countries, thus originating diverse regional genres.

From the elaboration and fusion process of the first Spanish song-dances with sesquiáltera rhythm that arrived in Cuba, such as the Sarabanda and Chacona from the 16th century, three main lines of generic evolution originated, which may be classified as follows:

1 – sung dances, which include in chronological order, the punto guajiro and the zapateo, the Cuban guaracha, the rural rumba, the urban rumba, the Carnival conga, the son, the danzonete, the Salon rumba, the Salon conga, the danceable bolero, the son montuno, the mambo, the chachachá, the songo and the timba.

2 – dances, comprised by genres such as the Cuban contradanza, the danza, the danzón and the danzón-mambo.

3 – songs, comprised by the habanera, the bolero cubano, the guajira, the clave, the criolla, the tango congo, the pregón and other hybrid genres such as the guaracha-son, the guajira-son, the bolero-son, the lamento-son, the criolla-bolero, the bolero-danzón, the canción-habanera and the canción-bolero.

== Cuban folk genres ==
According to its encyclopedic definition, the term folk music (that derives from the German word "folk" or people in English) serves to designate the music spontaneously created and preserved by the people of a country, in contrast with the terms commercial and classical music, which are related to works generated by trained specialists.

In the case of Cuban music, some of its most popular musical genres may be considered within the boundaries of the previous definition. The first Cuban popular music genres that emerged to the public awareness at the beginning of the 19th century, known as Punto cubano and Zapateo, were created by peasants without any formal musical education; as well as the popular styles of Rumba Urbana or "de cajón" (wooden boxes) and the Cuban Carnival Conga (music).

Also the Cuban Guaracha was considered to be a product of the common people from Havana, in a similar way as the Rural Rumbas and other ancestors of the Son cubano (such as Changüí from Guantánamo and the Sucu-sucu in Isla de Pinos) were considered to be. The Son cubano itself was born from a synthesis of different popular styles such as the Rumba Urbana and Rumba Rural, and performed until the 1930s by amateur musicians.

Another Cuban folk music style emerged between the end of the 19th century and the beginning of the 20th in the poor neighborhoods of Havana. It was called Clave upon the name of the instrument utilized to accompany it, the Cuban Claves. This style was sung by popular choirs mostly integrated by colored people, called "Coros de Clave", and its rhythm was the vertical hemiola, also utilized in the ternary Cuban Contradanza.

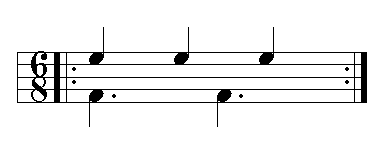
Vertical hemiola.

== Instruments ==
Cuba also has produced a wealth of folk musical instruments. Among the most important ones we should mention the Claves, the Bongo drum and the Conga, derived from original African instruments; as well as the Tres, a descendant of the Spanish Laúd. There are also others less well known folk instruments such as the Tingo-Talango or Tumbandera (Ground bow), the botija and the Marímbula, a sort of African Mbira.

== Musicians ==
Some well known Cuban folk music artists are: Punto singer Celina González, trovadores Sindo Garay and María Teresa Vera as well as soneros Ignacio Piñeiro, Máximo Francisco Repilado Muñoz Telles (Compay Segundo), Ibrahim Ferrer and Rubén Gonzalez.
