= Mojigangas =

Lively theatrical parade with costumes

The Mojigangas originated as a farce performed with masks and traditional costumes at public festivals with Carnival-like roots. It consisted of a short comic-burlesque verse text with a musical element, and it became a minor dramatic genre of the Spanish Golden Age. In the corrales de comedias, the mojigangas were parades of costumed actors dancing to boisterous music. These parades marked the end of the show.

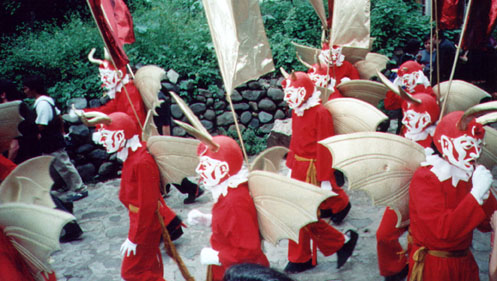
Mojiganga of Zacualpan de Amilpas (Mexico)

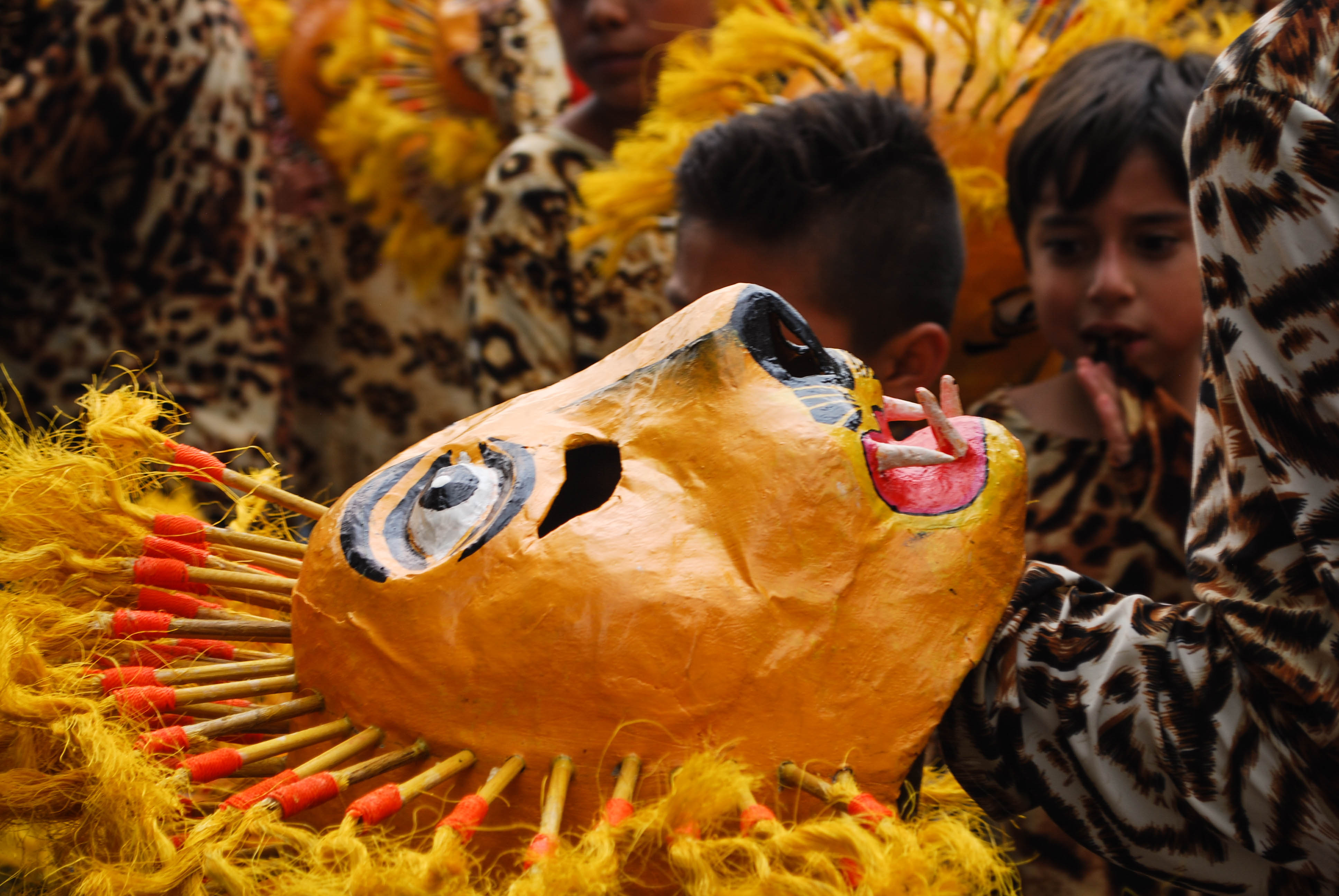
Zacualpan Mojiganga 051

== Types ==
There are two main types: paratheatrical mojigangas, which are more popular and carnivalesque in style and sometimes feature actors dressed as animals, and dramatic mojigangas. The following can be distinguished within these types:

- Paratheatrical mojigangas without plot
- Paratheatrical mojigangas with plot
- Dramatic mojigangas for Carnival
- Dramatic mojigangas for Lent
- Dramatic mojigangas for Corpus Christi
- Dramatic mojigangas for Christmas
- Dramatic mojigangas for royal festivities

== Historical evolution ==
It has been proposed that the term mojiganga originates from the boxiganga or bojiganga companies of 16th- and 17th-century itinerant theater (one of the eight listed by Agustín de Rojas Villandrando in his book El Viaje Entretenido). (Note: According to Pere Coromines (Pedro Corominas), the original term was boxiganga, and "it primitively designated a character characterized by bladders attached to the end of a stick, a character that was typical of mojigangas". From this it is presumed that boxiganga derives from "voxiga", a phonetic variant of "vejiga" (bladder).) Over time and thanks to the popularity of these grotesque masquerades, the genre ended up invading the space of the Baroque entremés. Thus, the so-called mojiganga entremesada was, from the mid-17th century onwards, the brief dramatic piece par excellence. Among the cultivators of the genre, the following stood out: Pedro Calderón de la Barca (La mojiganga de las visiones de la muerte), Juan Vélez (Mojiganga de las figuras), Simón Aguado (Mojiganga de las niñas de la Rollona), Vicente Suárez de Deza, Francisco Monteser, Alonso de Ayala and Manuel de León Marchante, among others. Francisco de Quevedo and Pedro de Quirós also cultivated the genre.

== Continuity of the mojiganga in Spain ==
Even in the 21st century, some localities in the Valencian Community still preserve the mojiganga, a mixture of dance, religious celebration and ethnographic treasure. Notable examples can be found in Titaguas and Algemesí, both of which are located in the province of Valencia, street shows also called muixeranga, with music, dances, traditional costumes and human towers, in an ensemble called "Ball de Valencians".

Likewise, in the town of Graus in Huesca, a Mojiganga is performed on September 13.

== The mojiganga in Hispanic America ==
In Hispanic America, the use of the term "mojiganga" is recorded in 1637, referring to a street dance during carnivals. In it, mime was more important than words, and it was performed by actors who imitated animals.

=== Mexico ===
In Mexico, specifically in Zacualpan de Amilpas in the state of Morelos, a mojiganga is celebrated every year with costumed comparsas, allegorical or religious floats and, on occasions, dancing giants. The tradition of large wind bands is very strong in the state, and a large number of bands are always present at the festivities. The celebration takes place on the last Sunday of September, as part of the festivities in honor of the Virgin of the Rosary.

In San Andrés Tuxtla (Veracruz), the mojiganga is celebrated on November 28 and 29, for which figures made of cane and lined with paper are created that travel through the main streets of the town with music, celebrating the patron saint San Andrés Apóstol. They are also celebrated on December 7, 8 and 12.

In San Juan de los Lagos, Jalisco, there is also a group of mojigangas dedicated to participating in the fairs and carnivals of the Altos de Jalisco region, in San Juan de Los Lagos, Jalostotitlán, Lagos de Moreno and Tepatitlán de Morelos.

In the city of San Miguel de Allende, in the state of Guanajuato, the use of mojigangas is a tradition; they can be seen walking daily through the streets of the town. Likewise, they are seen dancing alongside the banda, the estudiantina or rondallas during the popular callejoneadas.

Zacatecas, for its part, also maintains this tradition in southeastern localities such as Pedregoso, in Pinos and El Lobo in Loreto.

In Michoacán, mojigangas are especially characteristic of the municipality of Pátzcuaro, where they go out to dance through the streets announcing weeks before the feast of the Virgen de la Salud, which is celebrated on December 8.

=== Ecuador ===
In Ecuador, the mojigangas were performed by the "Bandas del Mate" on the coast. Among the dances that were included are: the galope montubio, the molinito, the puerca raspada, the Alza que te han visto, as well as some polcas montubias such as "El gallinacito", the "Saca tu pié". Both the gurufaes and mojigos dances were part of Corpus Christi on the Ecuadorian coast and were the center of music related to the liturgical calendar of Montubio culture. Chigualos during Christmas had a similar function.

=== Spain ===
In Spain, a unique example of mojiganga is the contradanza de Cetina which is celebrated in honor of San Juan Lorenzo every year in Cetina (Aragon) on the night of May 19.

== See also ==
- Spanish Golden Age
- Corral de comedias
