= Trompeta china =

Cuban traditional wind instrument

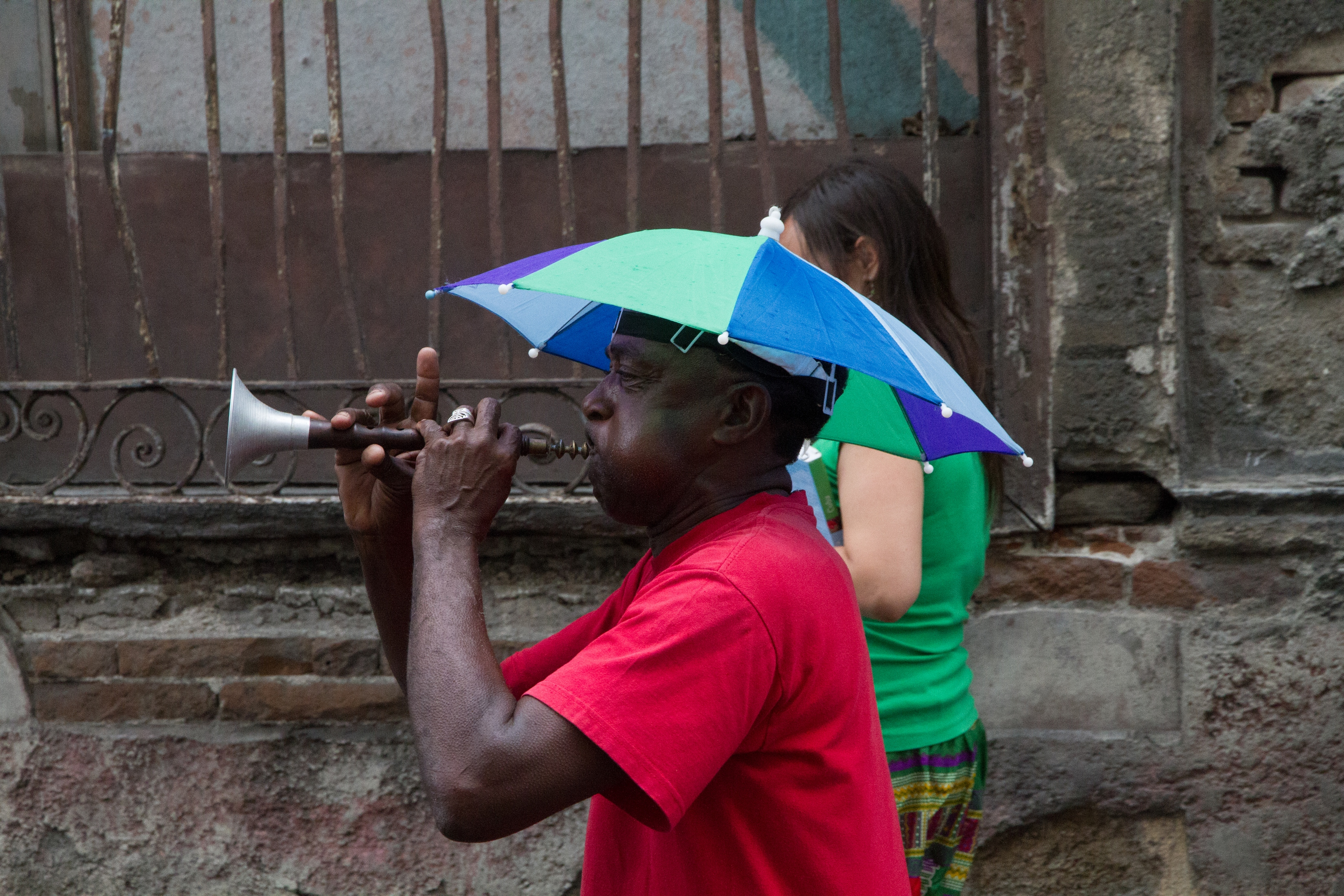
Frontman with trompeta china of the Conga de Tivoli in Santiago de Cuba

The trompeta china (also called corneta china), a Cuban traditional wind instrument, is actually the Chinese suona, an instrument in the oboe family (and thus not a trumpet, despite its name) introduced to Cuba by Chinese immigrants during the colonial period (specifically the late nineteenth century).

The trompeta china is used primarily in Cuban carnival music, particularly in the eastern region of Santiago, where it is an integral part of the comparsa (carnival musical ensemble). The instrument has also been adopted for use in some forms of son. Players of the trompeta china are not necessarily of Chinese ancestry, and in Cuba the instrument's playing style is more imitative of a trumpet than the traditional playing style of the suona or any other Chinese instrument.

In addition to its use in Cuba, Canadian jazz saxophonist and flautist Jane Bunnett has taken up the trompeta china and uses it with her Afro-Cuban jazz band.

== See also ==
- Conga (music)
