= Bombo criollo =

Family of Latin American drums

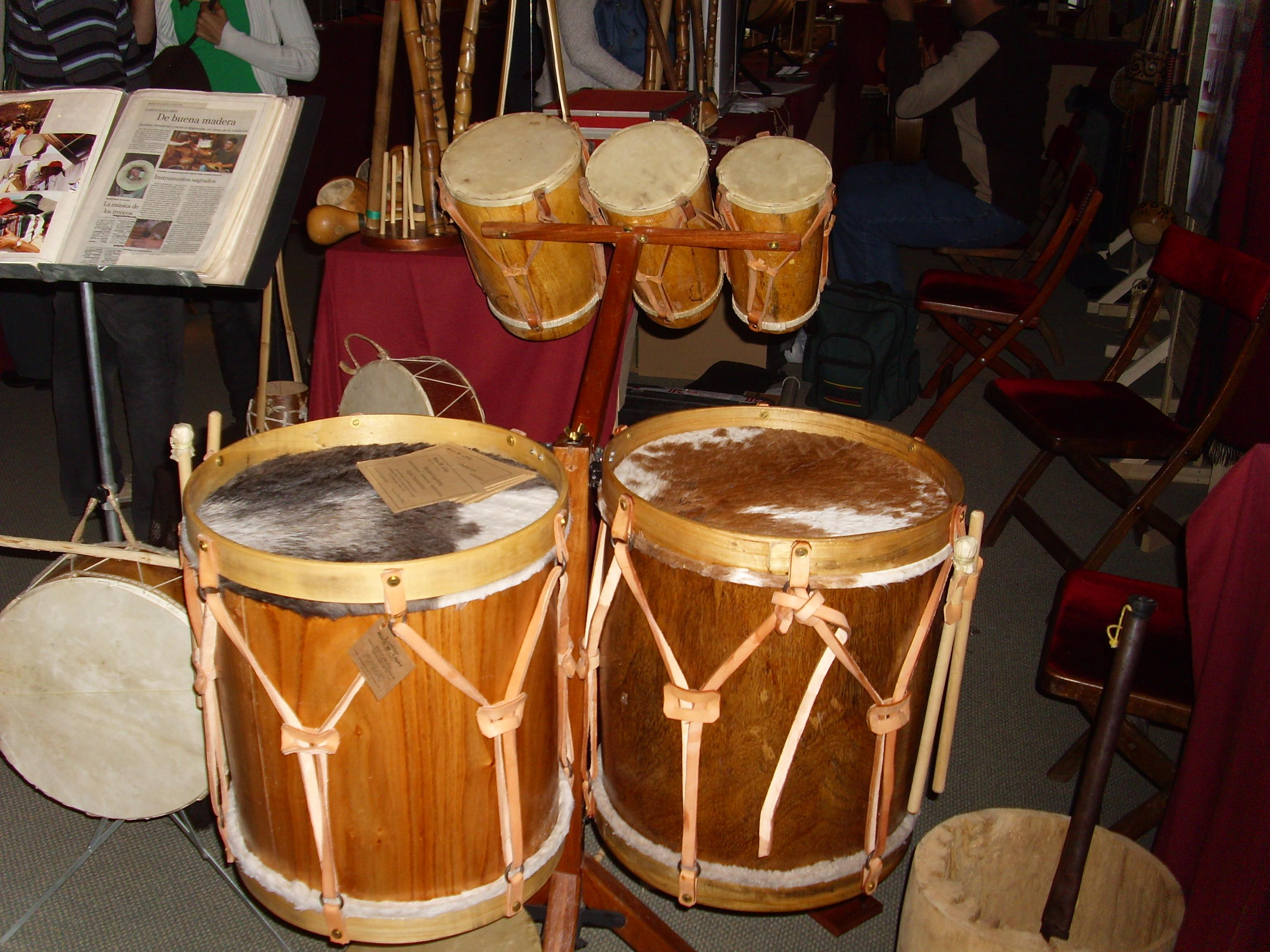
Argentine bombos legüeros in a store in Buenos Aires.

The bombo criollo, or simply bombo, is any of a family of Latin American drums derived from the European bass drum (also called in Spanish bombo) and native Latin American drum traditions. These drums are of smaller dimensions than the orchestral bass drum, and their frame can be made of wood or steel. They can be held vertically or diagonally on the body or a stand. The specific make of the instrument depends on the regional tradition. In Argentina, the bombo criollo is called bombo legüero and played in many folkloric styles. In Cuba, bombos are the largest drums played by the street comparsas in Santiago. In other countries, the term tambora is commonly used.

The bombo should not be confused with the Puerto Rican bomba, a genre of music played with hand drums called barriles de bomba (bomba barrels), which are unrelated to the European bass drums.

== Argentina ==
The bombo legüero is a common instrument in Argentine folk traditions such as zamba and chacarera. The body of the drum is made out of a hollowed tree trunk, and the head is made of animal skins.

== Cuba ==
The bombo or tambora is the lowest drum used in conga santiaguera, the music of the street carnivals from Santiago de Cuba. They are tuneable, two-headed military drums introduced in the island by the Spanish settlers.

In tumba francesa and tahona, two styles imported into Oriente by Afro-Haitian slaves after the Haitian Revolution, the bass drum (slightly smaller than the bombo) is called tambora, tamborita or tambuché.

== Tamboras ==
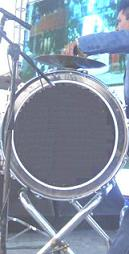
Mexican brass band tambora.

In some Latin American countries the term tambora is used to refer to bombos criollos. Nonetheless, tamboras are generally wider than other bombos criollos, possibly being an adaptation of both European bass drums (bombos) and side drums (redoblantes).

=== Colombia and Panama ===
In Colombia and Panama, tamboras are used to play cumbia. Traditionally, this kind of tambora is played with sticks and fixed on a stand.

=== Dominican Republic ===
In the Dominican Republic, tamboras are two-headed drums used in merengue music. They were traditionally made from salvaged rum barrels.

=== Mexico ===
Mexican tamboras have a diameter of 20 to 26 inches. There are two types of tambora in Mexican music: a traditional, with no cymbals, used in the folk ensembles tamborileros del norte, violín y tambora and jaraberos, and the one used en Mexican brass bands, as in banda sinaloense, tamborazo zacatecano and duranguense which has a cymbal over the frame and a stand for the drum. A felt mallet is used to beat the drum.

=== Venezuela ===
The Venezuelan tambora is played in gaita zuliana. It is a one-headed drum played with sticks. The player can sit on it or put it between his or her legs to perform rhythms on the instrument, strucking the head, the rim or the body of the drum.
