= Conga line =

Cuban novelty line dance

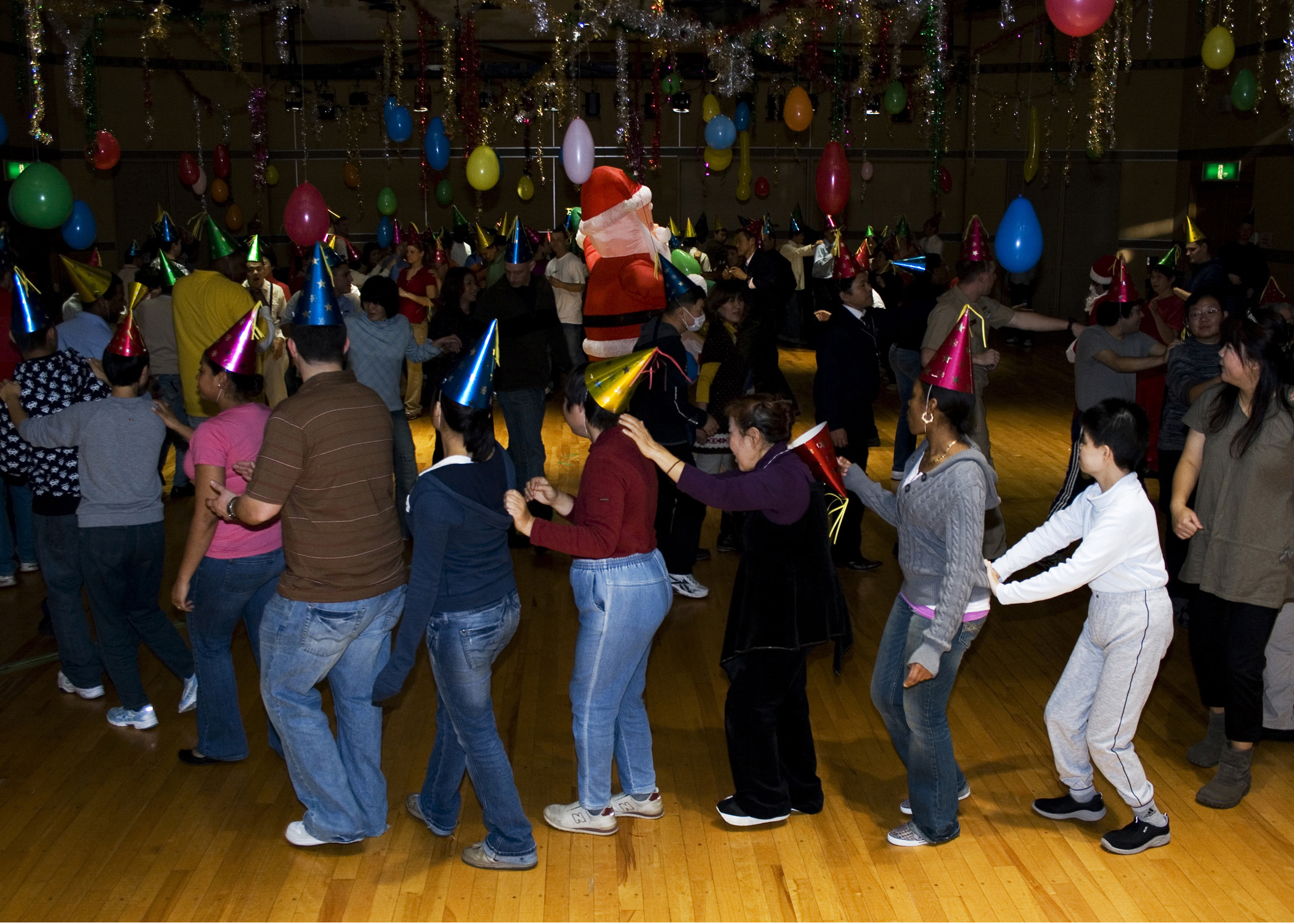
A conga line formed during a Christmas disco party.

The conga line is a novelty line dance that was derived from the Cuban carnival dance of the same name and became popular in the US in the 1930s, 1940s and 1950s. In order to perform the dance, dancers form a long, processing line, which would usually turn into a circle. It has three shuffle steps on the beat, followed by a kick that is slightly ahead of the fourth beat. The conga, a term sometimes mistakenly believed to be derived from the African region of Congo, is both a lyrical and danceable genre, rooted in the music of carnival troupes or comparsas.

== Origin ==
The conga dance was believed to have been brought over from Africa by enslaved people in the West Indies, and became a popular street dance in Cuba. The style was appropriated by politicians during the early years of republic in an attempt to appeal to the masses before election. During Gerardo Machado's dictatorship in Cuba, Havana citizens were forbidden to dance the conga since rival groups would work themselves to high excitement and start street fights. This was not the case when Fulgencio Batista became president in the 1940s - he permitted people to dance congas during elections, but a police permit was required.

== Description ==
The conga dance style is more of a march, which is characterized by its distinctive conga drum rhythm. It differs from the Cuban rumba, which uses movements considered "hip" and shows the sensually aggressive attitude of each dancer. Conga music is played with a staccato beat as its base, which gives rhythm to the movements of the dancers. Conga dancers lift their legs in time with the rhythm of the music, marking each beat with the strong motion of their body.

The basic dance steps start from left leg 1-2-3 kick then repeat, opposite. Originally, a band member wearing a drum would venture onto the dance floor and begin zig-zagging around while drumming out the rhythm. Dancers would start joining up behind the drummer, forming a line that moves like a snake in an open circle. The line (or the circular chain) would grow longer and the drumming more intense until it finally stopped. The dance has two styles, which is a single line form and partners. The single line is more popular in Cuba.

== Western popularity ==
Beginning in the late 1930s, the dance became popular in the United States. With its simple march step, the interlinking of dancers circling about in single file, and one-two-three-bump rhythm with the fourth beat strongly marked, the dance was not only attractive but also readily accessible to US and other foreign audiences. The dance started to gain a foothold in the US around 1929, when the original La Conga nightclub opened its doors in Manhattan. It is believed that the La Conga was at Broadway and 51st Street. By 1937, the conga was well known in New York.

This music and dance form has become totally assimilated into Cuba's musical heritage and has been used in many film soundtracks in the US and Mexico. One of the earliest and most successful of 20th-century Cuban musical exports, the conga lacked the polyrhythmic sophistication of the son, mambo, or salsa but served to nurture the future receptivity of an international public to the wider gamut of Cuban musical styles.

== Similar dances ==
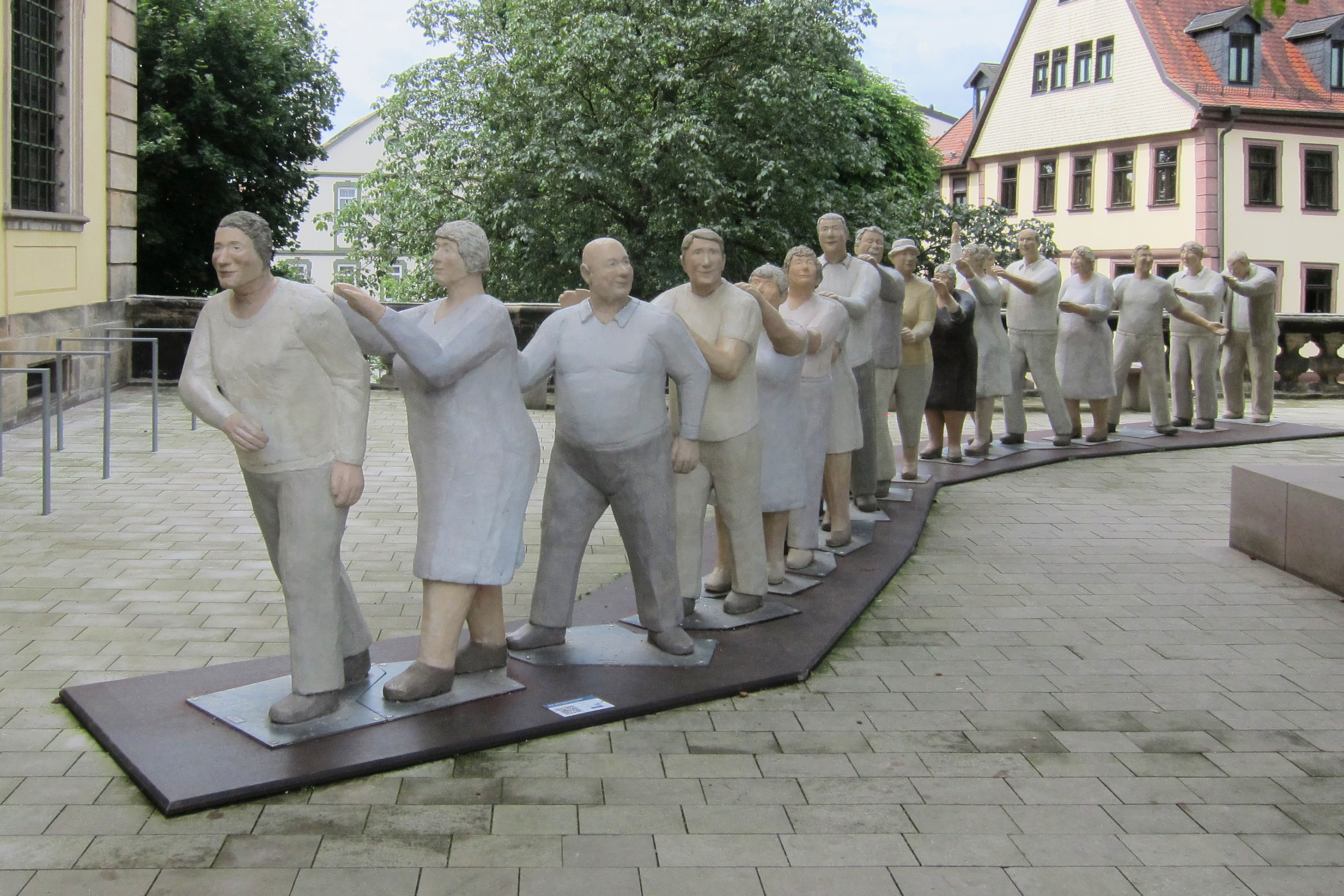
Statue depicting a Polonaise dance in Fulda, Germany.

In Germany and the Netherlands, a similar dance is known as Polonaise, which is unrelated to the traditional Polish folk dance. The dance was popularized through the song Polonäse Blankenese (1981) by German singer Gottlieb Wendehals, which was also covered in Dutch by Arie Ribbens as Polonaise Hollandaise (1982). The dance is a staple of Carnival celebrations and other festivities, such as weddings and sport events.

In France, the dance is known as La chenille (the caterpillar). It was popularized through the 1977 song of the same name by La Bande à Basile.

== In popular culture ==
The widespread popularity of the dance resulted in many cultural references in contemporary media.

=== In film and TV ===
- In the 1940s, the conga line became very popular due to Hollywood's "Latin" musicals. RKO Pictures' offerings were particularly influential, notably Too Many Girls (1940), in which Desi Arnaz appeared as a conga-playing Argentine student. Spanish-Catalan bandleader Xavier Cugat, who gave Arnaz his musical start, helped to popularize the dance, but the biggest impact belonged to Arnaz himself.
- A conga line was featured in Strike Up The Band (1940) with Judy Garland and Mickey Rooney.
- The conga line is also prominently featured in the 1941 Deanna Durbin film, It Started With Eve, in which Durbin and Charles Laughton dance the dance together in a nightclub.
- In Ball of Fire (1941), nightclub singer Sugarpuss O'Shea (Barbara Stanwyck) teaches the professors the conga and subsequently perform a conga line in the library.
- The dance was also a recurring theme in Warner Bros. animated cartoons of the 1940s.
- In the 1950 Malayan movie Twin Sisters (Kembar?), a conga line is performed by the guests of a party in the opening scene.
- The 1955 musical film adaptation of My Sister Eileen features a conga line as a recurring gag.
- In Billy Liar (1963), a scene at the Locarno Dance Hall in Manchester features the conga line.
- In season 4, episode 2 of the AMC drama series Mad Men, “Christmas Comes But Once a Year”, Joan Harris (Christina Hendricks), leads a conga line at the SCDP (Sterling Cooper Draper Price) office Christmas party.

=== In music ===
- In 1984, British band Black Lace reached number ten in the UK charts with the song "Do the Conga".
- In 1985, Cuban-American band Miami Sound Machine reached number ten on the US Billboard Hot 100 with the song "Conga".
- The dance is featured in the music video for Buster Poindexter's 1987 hit Hot Hot Hot, which is popular at wedding parties across the globe.
- The long-time jingle for Dad's Old-Fashioned Root Beer employed a conga beat.

=== In video games ===
- In Team Fortress 2, players are able to form Conga lines using the in-game taunt system, by purchasing the taunt through the in-game store.

=== Other ===
- The weekly fundraising event held by the charitable organisation Phone Credit For Refugees every Friday is based around the formation of a virtual conga line.

== See also ==
- Bunny hop
- Letkajenkka
- Polonaise
