= Los Pinos (disambiguation) =

Los Pinos is the official residence and office of the President of Mexico.

Los Pinos may also refer to:

- Los Pinos Airstrip, in Baja California, Mexico
- Los Pinos, New Mexico, a ghost town in the US
- Los Pinos, Uruguay, a village
- Los Pinos / Constituyentes (Cablebús), an aerial lift cable car station in Mexico City
- Rio de los Pinos, a river in Colorado and New Mexico, U.S.

== See also ==
- Os Pinos, the official anthem of Galicia, Spain
- Pinos (disambiguation)
