= Pinos volcanic complex =

Coordinates: 22.340053°N 101.501023°W

The Pinos volcanic complex is an extinct volcanic complex in the Pinos Municipality, Zacatecas and Ahualulco Municipality in San Luis Potosí, Mexico, which was active during the Middle Tertiary, it was discovered due to having been found volcanic rocks, sedimentary rocks, conglomerate sandstone, red beds 900 meters thick, inhomogeneous mixture of magma, polymitic and granite with muscovite and tourmaline. The complex is mainly composed of lava domes, volcanic tuffs and geological faults, the period of activity was between about 32 ma–27 ma.
