= Pedregoso, Zacatecas =

Town in the Mexican state of Zacatecas

Pedregoso
- Town
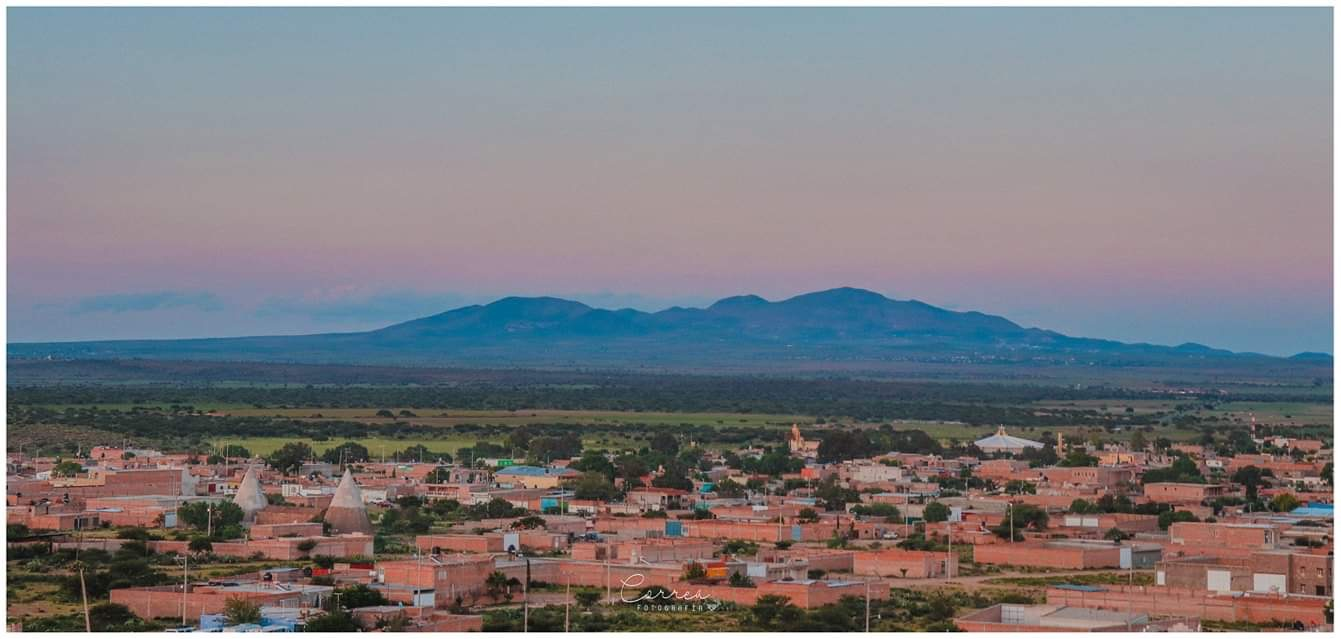
- Panoramic view of Pedregoso

- Location in Mexico Pedregoso (Mexico)
- Coordinates: 22.254170°N 101.758747°W
- Country: Mexico
- State: Zacatecas
- Municipality: Pinos

Government
  - Municipal President: Omar Téllez Agüayo (PRI)
- Elevation: 2,188 m (7,178 ft)

Population (2010)
  - Total: 2,629
- Postal code: 98959

Pedregoso (Literally: Stony) is a town the Pinos Municipality, State of Zacatecas, Mexico. It is located 135 km southeast of the Zacatecas City, 86.5 km from Aguascalientes City, 118 km from San Luis Potosí City, and 25 km from Pinos.

== Population ==
It has a population of 2,629 inhabitants (2010 Mexico census), making it the second most populous town in the municipality and, together with Pinos, one of the only two urban centers that exist in it.
