= Ashiko =

Tapered drum traditionally found in West Africa and part of the Americas

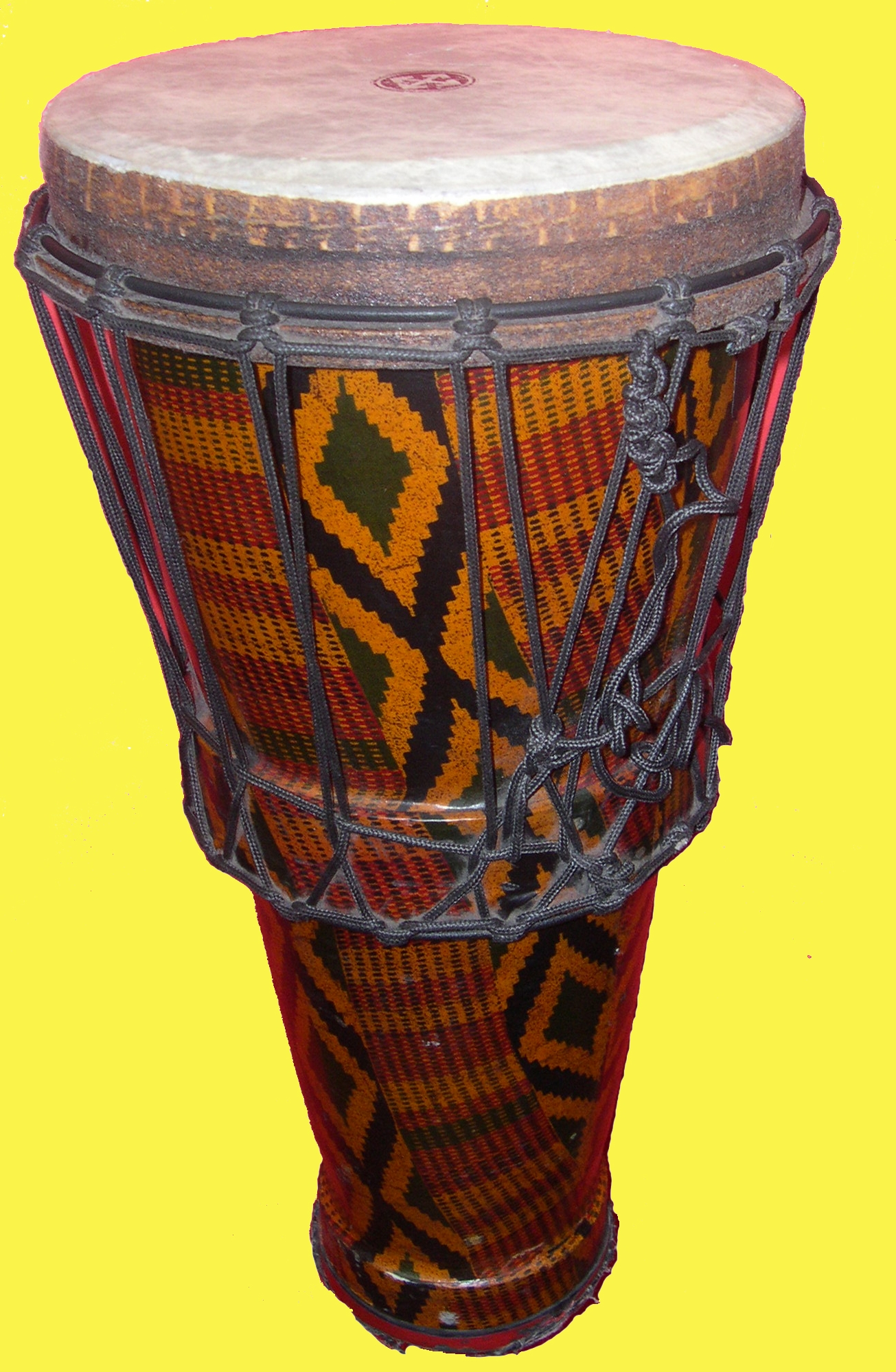

Percussion instrument
- Classification: Membranophone
- Hornbostel–Sachs classification: 211.251.1 (Open ended conical drum)
- Developed: Yoruba

The ashiko is a drum, shaped like a tapered cylinder or truncated cone with the head on the wide end, and the narrow end open. It is made of hardwood and generally has a calfskin hide. Nowadays, goatskin is sometimes used, in imitation of the high sound of the popular djembe drum. It is played with the hands, and tuned by ropes. Ashiko drums – or variants thereof – are traditionally found in West Africa, as well as part of the Americas.

== History ==
The origins of the ashiko drum are traced to the Yoruba culture in (mainly) present-day Nigeria and Benin, West Africa. The word “ashiko” is also traced to a word in the Yoruba language meaning either “drum” or (with tonal difference) "time-frame" or “freedom”. The drum has a long tradition in Yoruba culture, where the drum functioned in community celebrations, as well as a “talking drum”. Traditional ashikos were/are hand carved from a single log of wood and were not straight cones.

Perhaps because Yorubaland and surrounding areas were strongly involved in (affected by) the Atlantic slave trade, drums with similar forms and characteristics are historically found in Afro-Caribbean and Afro-Latin American cultures and traditions. In Cuba specifically,“ashiko-like” drums can be identified in the drum known as “bocú” in Eastern Cuba, as well as one of the drums (a solo drum) used in the Abakua secret society. Drums similarly shaped to the ashiko - including the "truncated cone" form - can also be found in Afro-Colombian music (the Tambor Alegre in the Caribbean region of Colombia), as well as in Afro-Brazilian music, such as the Timbau. The latter, from the Bahia region, tends to have synthetic heads, however, and is, unlike the ashiko, tuned by pegs.

The African/Nigerian ashiko as such first got disseminated and popularized in some circles in the US in the 1930s, after Nigerian drummer Moses Mianns emigrated to New York in the 1930s. The drum he commissioned in the United States is in the collections of the Schomburg Center for Research in Black Culture, the NYPL. Examining it, one can see the original ashiko is not a simple cone drum but is, in fact, curved on the inside, creating a softer tone, and emulating carved drums.

The ashiko received exposure on a much wider scale in the US and elsewhere in the 1950s and 1960s with the popularity of the touring folkloric ensemble created by Yoruba musician Babatunde Olatunji, which included ashiko and other drums. His ensemble of Montego Joe, Chief James Hawthorne Bey, Baba Taiwo DuVall, and Julito Collazo, were all students of Miannes who played with Olatunji, and disseminated the technique. They can be heard on Olatunji's groundbreaking LP for Columbia, Drums of Passion. Famed djembefola Ladji Camara, who truly introduced the drum to U.S. students, worked with Olatunji. He can be heard on Olatunji's More Drums of Passion.

After Olatunji opened for the Grateful Dead in the 1980s, the ashiko spread from its Afro-based constituency, and became part of the European-American growing local drum movement in the US and elsewhere in the Western world. Though it remains there, its popularity has dwindled to that of the djembe, conga, or bongos drums.

== Characteristics ==
Some call the ashiko a "male" counterpart to the djembe, though this is contradicted by references to the relatively matriarchal Yoruba culture. Also, it being regarded as "between a djembe and a conga" is seen as wrong, and disrespectful to the ashiko itself and its own tradition, including a distinct playing technique, different from the djembe or conga. A video example can be seen here: Traditional Ashiko Drum Playing Technique. The ashiko is a drum with its own history and is not a counterpart or derivative. There is, besides this, a geographical difference, as the djembe's origins are associated with the Mali empire (Guinee and Mali region), and the ashiko's as said with Yorubaland.

Superficial sonic similarities with the djembe relate to the goatskin head it has in common with it, but the longer, cylinder form of the ashiko drum makes the bass tone “deeper” than that of the bowl-shaped djembe, while in general the sounds – most speak of three different tones of the ashiko – are different (a bit softer) when compared to the djembe. That is especially true when one uses traditional techniques to play the drum. Some percussionists argue that the ashiko knows more "middle tones" when compared to the djembe.

Modern ashiko drums produced in the West are often made of vertical staves. Like other drums, they can be purchased with the standard 8, 10, or 12-inch diameters of the hides. Ashikos tuned by lugs and metal tacks are nowadays also produced. Some manufacturers use cow hide; some assume to make the ashiko resemble an Afro-Cuban conga. This is, in fact, the "old school" method.
