= Conga (music) =

Cuban music style, rhythm

- Stylistic origins: Congolese and West African traditions
- Cultural origins: Cuba, mid-19th century
- Typical instruments: Corneta china, trumpet, trombone, bokú, bombo, conga drums, metallic idiophones
- Derivative forms: Ballroom conga

Regional scenes
- Santiago de Cuba and Havana

The term conga refers to the music groups within Cuban comparsas and the music they play. Comparsas are large ensembles of musicians, singers and dancers with a specific costume and choreography which perform in the street carnivals of Santiago de Cuba, Camaguey, and Havana.

The instrumentation differs between congas santiagueras and congas habaneras. Congas santiagueras include the corneta china (Chinese cornet), which is an adaptation of the Cantonese suona introduced in Oriente in 1915, and its percussion section comprises bocúes (similar to African ashiko drums), the quinto (highest pitched conga drum), galletas and the pilón, as well as brakes which are struck with metal sticks. Congas habaneras lack the corneta china but include trumpets, trombones and saxophones, and they have a different set of percussion instruments: redoblantes (side drums), bombos (bass drums), quinto, tumbadora (the lowest pitched conga drum), and metallic idiophones such as cowbells, spoons, frying pans and rims.

Congas and comparsas have a long history which dates back to the 19th century, with musical traditions being passed down from one generation to the next. The older comparsas are derived from cabildos de nación or other social groups, whereas the later ones, called paseos, are derived from barrios (neighbourhoods). The music of the congas has become a genre itself, being introduced into Cuban popular music in the early 20th century by artists such as Eliseo Grenet and Armando Oréfiche and his Havana Cuban Boys. They have been present for decades in the repertoire of many conjuntos, Cuban big bands and descarga ensembles, also having an influence on modern genres such as salsa and songo. The conga drum, also known in Cuba as tumbadora, took its name from the congas de comparsa.

== History ==
The conga Paso Franco playing in the streets of Santiago

=== Origins ===
The history of the conga (also known as comparsa conga or conga de comparsa) is obscure and its origins remain largely unknown. In the early 19th century, although the word "conga" is not found in written sources, there are references to "tumbas", and, according to Brea and Millet (1993:204), "tumba" refers to the percussion ensemble of the conga. "Tumba" is mentioned in connection with mamarrachos (summer festivals in Santiago de Cuba) as early as 1847 (Pérez I 1988:54). A word that may be synonymous with "tumba" is the word "tango", mentioned as early as 1856 (Pérez I 1988:79). Unfortunately, most 19th-century writers were extremely negative towards Afro-Cuban culture and little information about the tumbas or tangos was recorded.

==== Relation to Kongo ethnic group ====
"Congo" was the word used to designate African slaves brought to Cuba from the Congo region of Africa (currently the Republic of the Congo, the Democratic Republic of the Congo and Angola). According to the rules of Spanish grammar, "congo" became a masculine noun/adjective and its feminine counterpart was formed by changing final "o" to "a." This Spanish noun/adjective pair has been used in Cuba to designate anything pertaining to the above-mentioned African slaves and their culture. Therefore, some have assumed that "conga" was originally an adjective (as in the expression comparsa conga), and that the comparsa was dropped and conga changed to a noun (del Carmen et al. 2005). However, the word conga may also derive from either "maconga" (song) or "nkunga" (song, sound) in "the language of the Congo" (Ortiz 1924:118).

Ortiz (II 1952-5:34) also states that the drum called bokú (one of the instruments of the conga) is "...typical of the congos." Goodman mentions the “comparsa conga” in conjunction with a carnaval figure known as “el Rey del Congo” (the "King of the Congo”), which seems to confirm a kongo ethnic connection to the conga (Pérez I 1988:104). Also, the word bokú means “drum” in Kikongo (Orovio 1981:58).

=== Antipathy after independence ===
In the early years after the establishment of the Republic of Cuba in 1902, there were numerous decrees by successive mayors of Santiago de Cuba banning "African drums and tangos". (Pérez I 1988:177, etc.) Apparently, these decrees were not faithfully enforced:

“In spite of the prohibitive proclamation, the tumbas echoed loudly everywhere, including in the most central and heavily-traveled areas. And together with the raucous and uncouth sound of the African tumba, the well-known arrolladera displayed its contortions.” (Pérez I 1988:254)

According to Pérez,

“Although the prohibition of African manifestations was reiterated, the comparsas were permitted. In reality, it was just a question of maintaining on paper that which could not really be enforced due to the express desire of the bourgeoisie, to whom these manifestations were a diversion, ‘something colorful’ and amusing.” (Pérez I 1988:179, note 13)

=== Debate ===
Opponents to the conga in print outnumbered defenders. The conga was a thing of the illiterate Afro-Cuban working people, while the writers of editorials and angry letters to the editor were upper-class Hispano-Cubans. One prominent attacker of the conga, and perhaps the most florid in his prose, was the long-time mayor of Santiago, Desiderio Alberto Arnaz II (father of American TV star Desi Arnaz), who expressed the feelings of some upper-class Cubans in a newspaper article of 1925:

“I will have you know that the initial days of our traditional masquerades – which have just passed – have left painful impressions in my mind. Allow me to explain. In every way, the carnival has been a joyful celebration of the soul of the people, an exhibition of good artistic taste, a competition of original ideas, a contest in which thought and action have always vied in giving objective form to the perfect conception of Beauty and towards the noble intent of the dignification of society; Paris, Rome, Venice, Madrid and Havana itself offer in their carnestolendas lessons on how complaisant liberty ought to be used in those periods of fantasy in order to educate the wishes and aspirations of the citizen. But here, in our city, in one of those scientifically inexplicable regressions towards a dark past, certain elements of our commonwealth seem committed – under the pretext of carnaval – to the repugnant task of checking human progress and causing harm to Civilization with their excesses. I refer to the ‘conga,’ that strident group of drums, frying pans and shrieks, to whose sounds epileptic, ragged, semi-nude crowds run about the streets of our metropolis, and who, between lubricous contortions and abrupt movements, show a lack of respect to society, offend morality, discredit our customs, lower us in the eyes of people from other countries and, what is worse, by their example, contaminate schoolchildren, who I have seen carried away by the heat of the lesson, panting and sweaty, engaging in frenetic competitions in corporal flexibility in those shameful tourneys of licentiousness.” (Pérez I 1988:337)

On the other hand, an opinion poll of 1936 on the conga elicited the following comments:

“…Let the hours, the minutes and the seconds pass as they will, as long as they do so as quickly as possible so that I can slap that bocú... From today, it is only 18 days until the carnaval starts. How it torments me to think that there are still so many days to go; I wish it were tomorrow;... I want you to know... that the sound of the conga nourishes me, the sound of the frying pans gives me life and the sound of the bocú drives me crazy. Several days prior to the beginning of rehearsals, I went to see a doctor; I felt overwhelmed, sad, pensive. He prescribed and gave me some injections, and I felt absolutely no different, but as soon as I heard the sound of the first bocú, I was completely cured, I felt strong and ready for anything. And I advise those who are unhappy and listless to get an invigorating injection of bocú, conga and frying pans and you’ll be OK in 24 hours.” (Pérez II 1988:22-3)

== Conga of Los Hoyos ==
Conga Santiaguera (Conga Oriental) takes place in Santiago de Cuba which is located in the Eastern part of the island, known as El Oriente. Santiago de Cuba is a province and city in Eastern Cuba, was the original capital of Cuba marking it a place full of culture and deep history. Within the Province we can find a neighborhood called Los Hoyos.

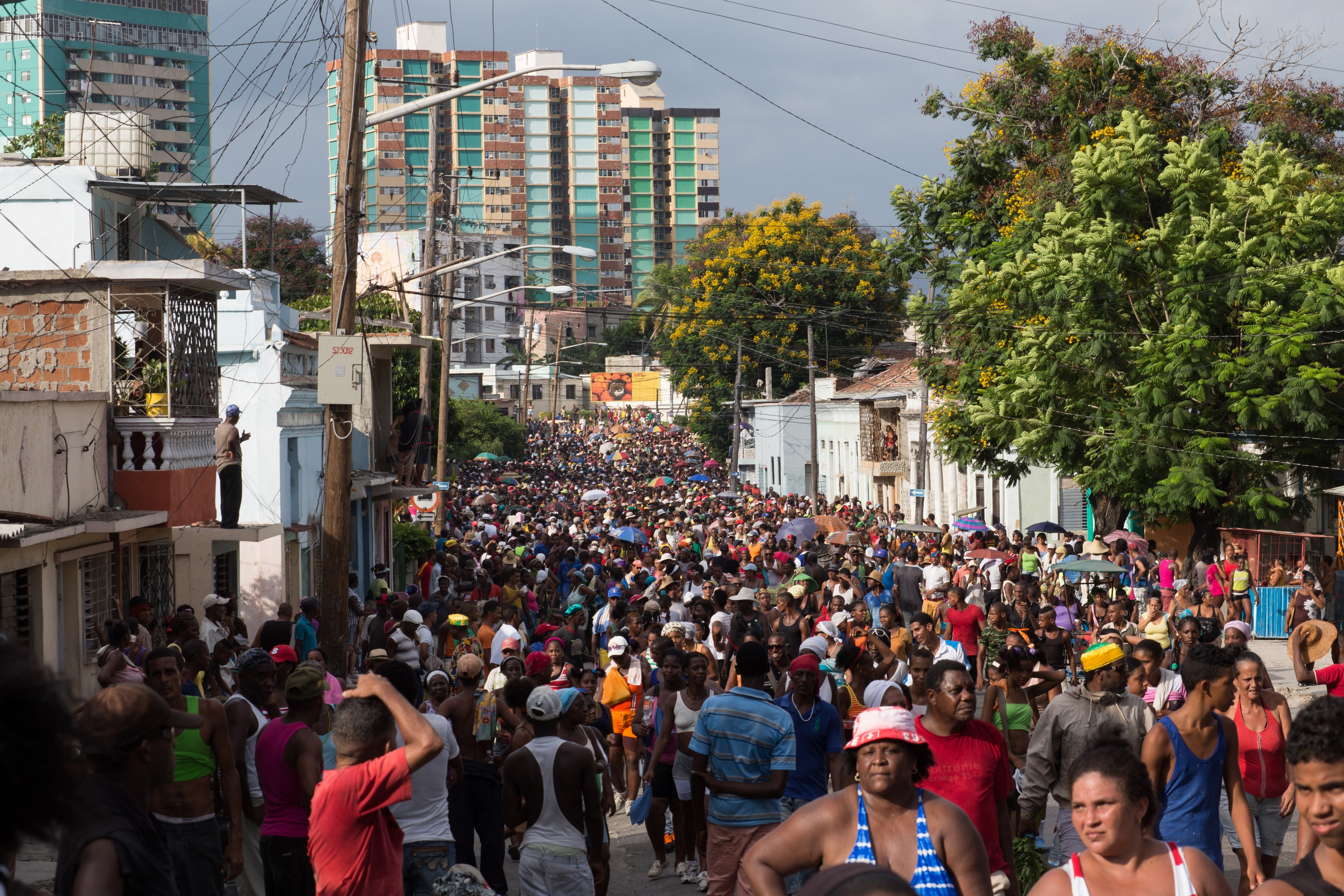
Invasión of the Conga de Los Hoyos in Santiago 2014

Los Hoyos is a district in downtown Santiago de Cuba and home to the conga of Los Hoyos. Los Hoyos neighboorhood is one of the oldest Afro-Cuban neighborhoods in Santiago de Cuba holding the title as one of the most famous conga and kicking off the unofficial start of the carnaval with the invasión. Geographically Los Hoyos is located next to Moncada Barracks, the landmark where the attack on July 26th 1953 led by Fidel Castro marked the start of the Cuban Revolution. Historians have stated that the attack was intentionally timed to coincide with Santiago de Cuba’s Carnaval to have the busy streets help provide cover for the young revolutionaries. The Conga Santiaguera brings together the diverse cultural roots of Santiago de Cuba, including strong Afro‑Cuban and Chinese influences that helped shape its musical, cultural, and instrumental identity of characteristic of groups like Conga de Los Hoyos.

The history of the Conga has been many interpretations according to Conga is a collection on neighborhood participants who come together through rhythmic music to parade in the city streets. This activity involves instruments specific to the region as well as a rhythm so unique that one can hear the conga coming from many streets down. According to up until the 1920s, there were two carnaval celebrations in the eastern province of Santiago de Cuba. Usually one was before Lent (called the Carnaval de los Balancos) and another was held in the summer (called el Carnaval de los Negros). Translation for these are carnaval for Whites and carnaval for Black. (Luis 2001, 51).

But the history of the Conga Santiaguera transcends 1900s, it goes as far back as the seventeenth century, where there was a “designated time”, right after the sugar harvest where slaves and their cabildos were allowed to express their own culture including music dance and costumes in the streets. “Celebratory days dedicated to important Catholic saints--Santa Cristina (July 24); the city's patron saint, Santiago Apostle (July 25); and Santa Ana (July 26)--coincided”. “Today Santiago's carnaval still unfolds over these days and coincides with the end of the sugar harvest, but it also commemorates Fidel Castro's attack on the Moncada barracks on July 26, 1953.” which added a more historical complex identify to what the Conga is today.

=== Invasion and Desfiles ===
El Carnaval in Santiago is stated to unofficially begin around July 17th and ends on July 26. The carnaval begins with the five-hour parade through the city, this is known as la invasion, by the Conga of Los Hoyos this marks the unofficial beginning of the carnaval. During the car "invasión," Conga of Los Hoyos marches around the streets of Santiago and visits the neighborhoods where the other famous congas are located. This "invasión" commemorates the invasion of the Army of Liberation at the end of the War of Independence. Los Hoyos also closes the traditional parades of the Carnaval of Santiago de Cuba (del Carmen et al. 2005). After the invasion, the general celebration unfolds which includes music in the streets this is both recorded and live, as well as games, vendors, bars, food halls all that help create a event full of community spirit, where hundreds of thousands of Cubans travel far and wide to attend.

“The conga groups of the various neighborhoods parade through the streets in their corridos (runs), which often include a visita (visit) during which the conga goes to another neighborhood to show off its group and music. Corridos can begin as early as June, when most groups are well into their rehearsal process. Around July 21, other types of carnaval groups begin their scheduled parades in front of city-appointed judges. These scheduled parades (desfiles) take place on Avenida Garzon, an avenue in the center of the city that is sectioned off with bleachers on either side of the street for appointed judges and an audience. Today's carnaval still culminates on July 24-26, when the various groups perform specially prepared presentations.”

==== Carnaval Groups ====
There are three types of groups in todays Carnaval de Santiago; paseos, comparsas, and congas. Paseos is usually, “usually representing an institution in the city such as the Ministry of Culture or the textile workers' union. It consists of a float upon which dancers--mostly women--perform to recorded, popular music in front of judges and spectators. The dancers are usually dressed in cabaret-style costumes, and the floats are decorated with dazzling lights and decorations.” Comparsa is described to be a big group of choreographed performers usually in costume and parade down Avenida Garzon and Congas are characterized by three main features. First characteristic of a conga begins in the streets not like a specific location like paseo or comparsa, second, they are not related to organizations linked to religion, government, or a specific ethnic group. Conga is socially identified to a specific area and location of people, because they are based on neighborhoods. Third characteristic of a conga is that it must have regular citizens that dance in the movement through the street, if the congas just consistent of musicians it would be a comparsa.

=== Instruments ===
At first, the instruments of the group were a pilón, some bocúes, a cowbell and a güiro. Later, two redoblantes were added, the number of bocúes was increased and the cowbell and güiro were replaced by frying pans. Later still, the frying pans were replaced by the campanas (automobile brake drums or other pieces of metal chosen for their distinct sound qualities). Also added were the quinto and the requinto. Los Hoyos first began using a corneta china in 1916 (del Carmen et al. 2005), one year after the instrument was introduced by the conga Los Colombianos from Tívoli.

== Instrumentation ==
A campana: the "cán," formerly belonging to the conga San Agustín

Walter Goodman (1838–1912), an Englishman who lived in Santiago de Cuba from 1864 to 1869, left what may be the earliest written description of the instruments of the conga: “… an odd orchestra composed of drums, frying pans, tin utensils, graters and güiros (Pérez I 1988:102)."

The present-day instruments fall into four categories. First are the campanas (Brea and Millet 1993:181), which are instruments of metal struck with metal beaters. Preferably, brake drums from older model American vehicles (1950s or older) are used. Originally, before brake drums were available, frying pans were used (Pérez I 1988:310, Pérez II 1988:23, etc.) and possibly plow blades as well (Pérez I 1988:106 and 134).

The second category is the bocuses (sing. bocú alt. pl. bocúes), also called fondos ("bottoms").

“The bokú is a single-headed drum, skin nailed to the shell, shell open at one end, long, shaped like a conic section and made of staves with iron hoops that circle them and hold them together. They are heated with fire and played with both hands and no sticks. The musician or bokusero carries the drum on his left side, hung over the shoulder with a strap.” (Ortíz II 1952-5:34)

Nowadays, the skin is usually held on by a metal hardware system similar to that of the commercial conga drum. Anywhere from four to 16 bocuses are used in one conga (Brea and Millet 1993:179). The bocuses play simple interlocking parts with few variations (however, the sum of the parts results in quite a complex drum melody). A smaller bocú, called a quinto or bocusito, plays complex off-beat figures and improvisations. According to Ortiz, the bocú was adopted by the conga when African drums were banned in the early years of the Republic.

“The fact that the modern Cuban bokú originates and is found only in the cities of Oriente, permits one to suppose that the bokú, with or without exact Bantu morphological antecedents, is an unusual type of drum in Cuba; but was adopted by the Cubans when, upon the prohibition of African drums, they resorted to new types of drums which, due to their unaccustomed appearances, were not imputable to Africans.”(Ortíz II 1952-5:36)

A third category are the bimembranophone tambores (Brea and Millet 1993:200), mentioned in documents as early as 1916 (Pérez I 1988:217) There are three tambores: one requinto and two galletas. The requinto (Brea and Millet 1993:198), first mentioned in writing as early as 1931 (Pérez II 1988:9), is shaped somewhat like a snare drum- about 50% wider than it is tall. It is hung from the left shoulder with the top of the drum slightly skewed to the left and is played with a stick on the right-hand skin while the left hand mutes or opens the left-hand skin. Its part is simple with few variations. The galletas (also called congas- Orovio 1981:186) are like bass drums, but flatter. They are both played with a stick in a manner similar to the requinto, except that they are hung from the shoulders in such a way that the skins are nearly horizontal to the ground. The higher pitched of the two is called a redoblante (Brea and Millet 1993:197). It measures approximately 2 feet in diameter and 5 inches high. In addition to its basic pattern, there are many floreos (variations) that it can play. The lower-pitched galleta is called a pilón (Brea and Millet 1993:196) or pilonera (Ortíz II 1952-5:242). It measure about 2 inches larger in each dimension than the redoblante. This drum plays a basic pattern with few variations. All three of the drums utilize a metal hardware system for attaching the skins to the drum shells.

As with the bocú, Ortiz asserts that the tambores were not originally used in the pre-Republican congas. “One is soon aware that these congas [galletas], like the drums of the comparsa carabalí, are ‘white’ imitations of drums whose African morphology has been disguised” (Ortíz II 1952-5:242).

The final category includes only one item: the trompetica china or corneta china (literally “Chinese trumpet/bugle”). This double reed instrument, called suona in Chinese, was brought to Havana in the 19th century by Chinese immigrants. It was being used to play traditional Chinese music in the Chinese theaters in Havana's Chinatown, when an Afro-Cuban comparsa named “Los Chinos Buenos” adapted it to use in place of an inspirador ("lead singer"). Although it was very difficult for anyone not standing within ten feet of the inspirador to hear him or her singing during a street performance, the trompetica china, due to its peculiar raucous and nasal sound, could usually be heard by the entire comparsa and its followers. In 1910, the trompetica china was brought to Santiago de Cuba by soldiers of the Cuban army (Ortíz II 1952-5:451). The first conga to incorporate its use was Paso Franco in 1915 (del Carmen et al. 2005). By 1924, it was a well-established feature of the conga (Pérez; I 1988:310). Today, the sound of this instrument is recognized by Cubans as the symbol of the carnavales of Oriente.

== Dance ==
The conga is danced with small sliding steps, advancing alternately. Imagining two measures of 2/4 time (the traditional time signature for the conga), if the right foot starts on the first eighth note of the first measure, then the left foot steps on the third eighth note of the first measure, the right again on the first eighth note of the second measure, the left on the third eighth note of the second measure, and so on. This basic step is called the "arrollao." The arms are bent at the elbow and swung opposite to the rhythm of the feet (Fernández 1974:91).

Basic step (arrollao).

There are many variations on the basic step, as well as simple figures such as "kick," "single turn," "cutting sugar cane," "shining shoes," etc.

Variation on basic step (Fernández 1974:92)

A common variation on the above variation is to eliminate the tie.

== Selected discography ==
- Carnaval à Santiago de Cuba; Le Chant du Monde LDX-A-4250
- Carnaval in Cuba; Folkways Records FW04065 (1981)- this page has samples of different styles of carnaval music, including conga.
- Santiago: Calles y Congas; Egrem C557 (1996)

== See also ==
- Carnaval of Santiago de Cuba
