= Pinos, Zacatecas =

Town in the Mexican state of Zacatecas

Pinos
- Town
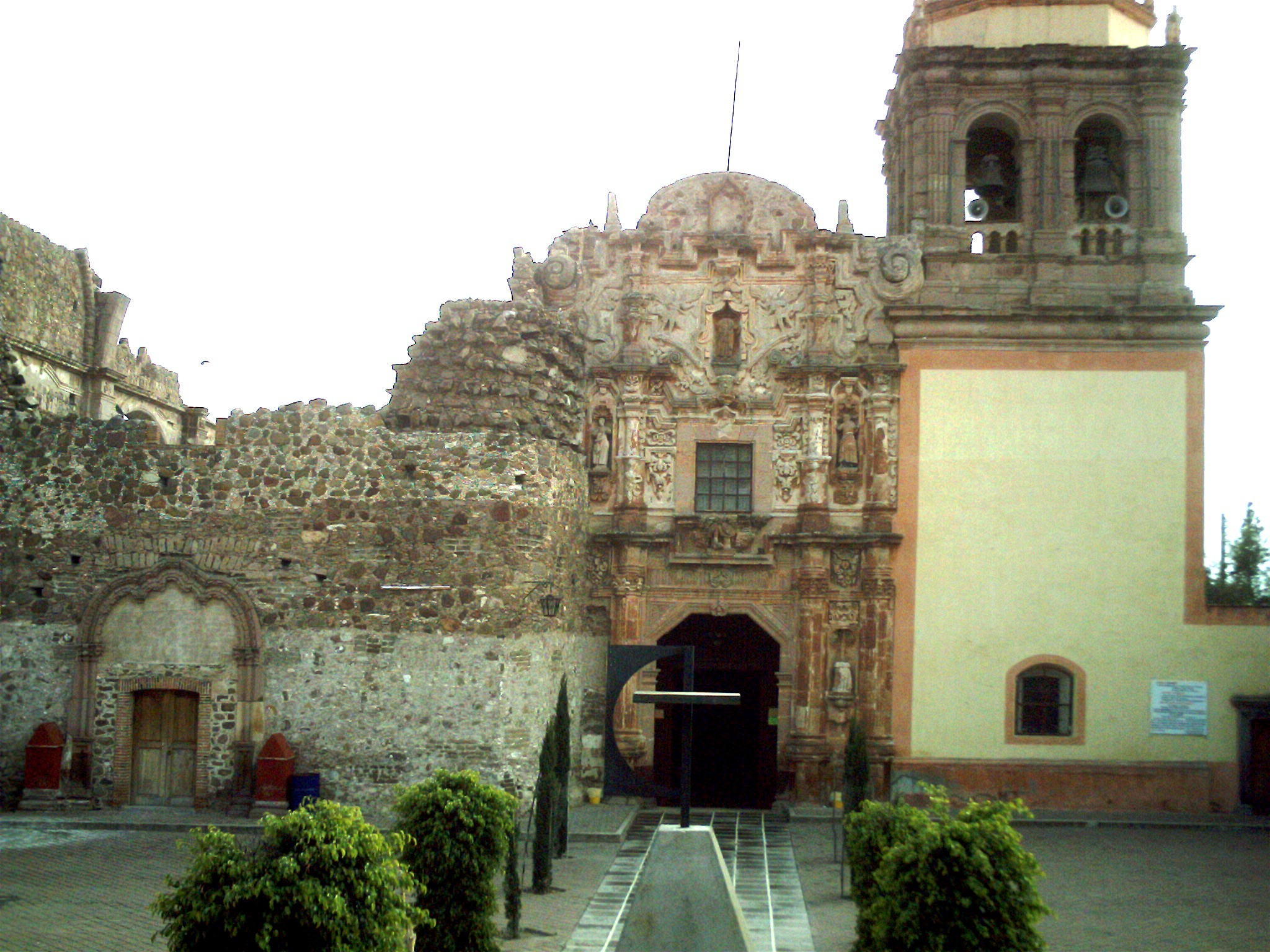
- Iglesia Principal of the town of Pinos.
- Etymology: from the abundance of pine trees in the area
- Location in Mexico
- Coordinates: 22°17′50″N 101°34′30″W
- Country: Mexico
- state: Zacatecas
- Municipality: Pinos
- Largest city: Pinos
- foundation: 12 February 1594

Government
  - municipal president: Alfonso Contreras Hernández

Area
  - Total: 3,152 km^{2} (1,217 sq mi)

Population (2010)
  - Total: 5,611
  - Density: 1.780/km^{2} (4.611/sq mi)
- Time zone: UTC−06:00 (Central Standard Time)
- ISO 3166 code: MEX
- Location within Mexico

UNESCO World Heritage Site
- Official name: Town of Pinos
- Part of: Camino Real de Tierra Adentro
- Criteria: Cultural: (ii)(iv)
- Reference: 1351-027
- Inscription: 2010 (34th Session)
- Area: 3.35 ha (8.3 acres)
- Buffer zone: 14.18 ha (35.0 acres)

The town of Pinos is located on the southeastern end of the state of Zacatecas in the municipality of Pinos in Mexico.
