= Pinos Municipality =

Municipality in Zacatecas, Mexico

Pinos Municipality Municipio de Pinos (Spanish)
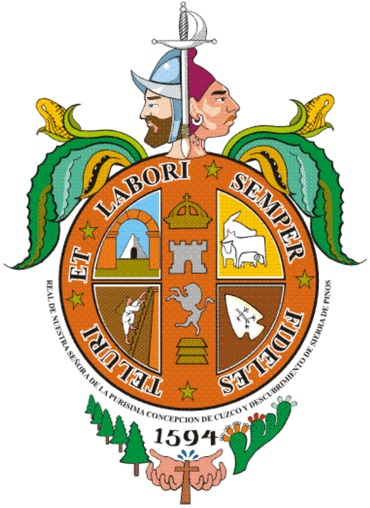
- Coat of arms
- Etymology: "From the Abundance of Pine Trees in the Area"

- Location in Mexico
- Coordinates: 22.308241°N 101.509785°W
- Country: Mexico
- state: Zacatecas
- Municipality: Pinos, Zacatecas

Government
  - municipal president: Omar Téllez Agüayo (PRI)

Area
  - Total: 3,152 km^{2} (1,217 sq mi)
- Elevation: 2,394 m (7,854 ft)

Population (2020)
  - Total: 72,241
  - Density: 22.92/km^{2} (59.36/sq mi)
- Time zone: UTC−06:00 (Central Standard Time)
- ISO 3166 code: MEX
- Website: www.pinos.gob.mx

Pinos Municipality is one of the 58 municipalities of the Mexican state of Zacatecas. The municipality borders the states of San Luis Potosí, Jalisco, and Guanajuato, The municipal seat is located in the community of Pinos. the largest town in the municipality is Pedregoso.

== Demographics ==
The results of the 2020 Population and Housing Census carried out by the National Institute of Statistics and Geography, result in a total of 72,241 people living in the municipality of Pinos, which are 34,756 men and 37,485 women.

Has a total of 309 localities, the main ones and the number of inhabitants in 2020 are the following:

Cities	Population
Total in Municipality	72 241
Pinos	6 304
Pedregoso	2 642
La Victoria	2 461
El Obraje	2 108
El Nigromante	1 941
Estancia de Guadalupe	1 913
San José de Castellanos	1 798
Santiago	1 556
Santa Elena	1 552
El Sitio	1 372
La Pendencia	1 262
Jaula de Abajo	1 181
Santa Ana	1 140
José María Pino Suárez (La Colorada)	949
Lobeña	948
Espíritu Santo	921
Agua Gorda de los Patos	919
