= Carnival of Santiago de Cuba =

Whether they are called carnavales, charangas or parrandas, large public celebrations dating at least (in Santiago de Cuba) as far back as the 17th century are common throughout Cuba. However, among Cubans, the Carnaval of Santiago de Cuba enjoys a special status (Pérez I 1988:20).

The history of Carnival in Cuba has been nuanced by a wide variety of interests and influences. Based on a Herskovitsian retention model, a cursory analysis might stress a continuous historical connection with Africa. But carnival cannot be explained only in terms of its African roots. Many of the practices and events within carnival culture are deliberately and consciously framed to connect to a construct of African’s that has resulted from over one hundred years of multicultural Cuban history. Carnival has always been an expression of shifting power negotiations among various aspects of Cuban society.

== Origin of the Carnaval: Mamarrachos ==
Carnival (Spanish “carnaval”), a pre-Lenten festival commonly held in Roman Catholic countries, became popular in Spain from the middle of the 1,000th century, was presumably brought to Cuba by Hispanic colonists (Pérez I 1988:15) and has been the basis for traditional celebrations in Cuba ever since (for example, Carnaval habanero). However, what is today called the Carnaval of Santiago de Cuba is not a manifestation of pre-Lenten carnival, which would be celebrated in February or March, but evolved out of the summer festivals formerly referred to as the (Fiestyou gayas de) mamarrachos (Brea and Millet 1993:193). Mamarrachos were held on June 24 (St. John’s [Midsummer] Day), June 29 (St. Peter’s Day), July 24 (St. Christine’s Day), July 25 (St. James the Apostle’s Day) and July 26 (St. Anne’s Day).

“Celebrations based on a religious pretext were always, at least in the case of the larger festivals, lacking in the liturgical character they were originally intended to have. From the written and oral sources, it seems that the so-called Days of St. John, St. Peter, St. Christine, St. Anne and St. James the Apostle were merely generic names which stood for days of public jubilation and diversion, totally lacking in the theological or liturgical meaning which it was convenient to feign, above all, during the days of the colonial government.” (Pérez I 1988:22)

The main activities were music, dancing and consumption of large quantities of alcoholic beverages. (Pérez I 1988:24, note 1)

The precise age and origins of the mamarrachos are unknown. The word "mamarrachos" itself does not appear in records until 1757 (Pérez I 1988:28). The festivals themselves are recorded as early as 1679, but certainly date from earlier on (Pérez I 1988:24). There are two theories about the origin of the summer festivals of Santiago. One is that they resulted from a gradual extension of more traditional European festivals, including carnaval (Pérez I 1988:21) Another theory is that the mamarrachos of July 24-6 had their genesis in the procession of St. James the Apostle, who is the patron saint of Santiago de Cuba (del Carmen et al. 2005) . The two theories are not mutually exclusive (see also below "Winter Carnival vs. Summer Carnival").

== A typical 19th-century Mamarrachos ==
A 19th century of animal-drawn carriages (whose occupants were not masked), the building of bonfires, pilgrimage to sanctuaries while carrying torches, the consumption of beverages such as aguardiente, “Yara” rum, natural fruit juices, chocolate, soup, beer, coffee, etc., the wearing of costumes and masks, masked balls (where music was performed by the orquesta típica and the repertoire consisted of contradanzas, danzas, danzones, rigadoons and walzes), the erection of mesitas (tables covered with awnings where beverages and refreshments were sold), versification in the form of cantos de pullas (mocking songs, often truly insulting and mostly improvised by comparsas or small groups of festival-goers), the spontaneous parading of the comparsas, and montompolo, a grand parade on the last day of mamarrachos, with all the comparsas participating in a farewell performance (Pérez I 1988:132-5, etc.). By the end of the 19th century, the building of bonfires, visiting sanctuaries while carrying torches and horse-racing had died out (Pérez I 1988:132-5).

== Comparsa ==
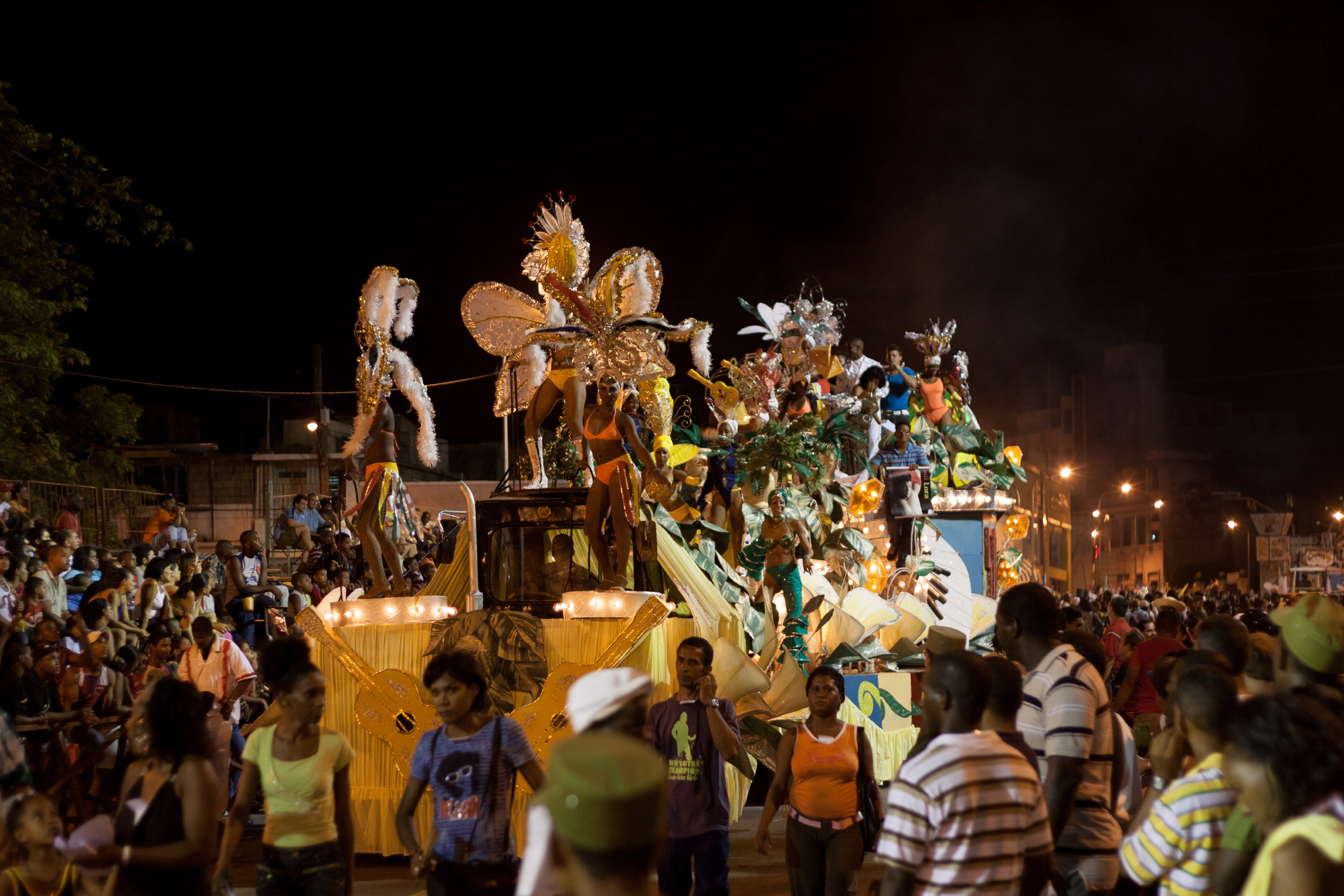
Comparsa in Santiago

The most important manifestations of the mamarrachos and the present-day carnaval of Santiago are the parades or street performances of comparsas. The Castilian word comparsa comes from the Italian comparire – “to appear briefly” – as in a walk-on appearance in a theatre. It can also mean a group of musicians and dancers who perform in the streets during (pre-Lenten) carnival or other festivals.

Comparsas are mentioned in connection with the mamarrachos of St. John and St. Peter in Santiago as early as 1679 (Pérez I 1988:24). The first comparsa recorded was called “Los Alegrones” and was active in 1757 (Pérez I 1988:28). The names of 46 comparsas that were active in the 19th century along with some details about their costumes, themes, etc. are mentioned by Nancy Pérez (I 1988:137-9), the Cuban historian of the Santiagueran carnaval.

Pérez divides 19th century Santiagueran comparsas into two categories: paseos and congas (Pérez I 1988:136) The paseo was distinguished "by its accompanying music, the scenography and the choreographed dance steps that it performed (Pérez I 1988:136)." Ramón Martínez defined a paseo as a "type of comparsa but instead of Tajona, the accompaniment was orchestral music, pasodobles and light marches." (Brea and Millet 1993:196). The musical ensembles that accompanied the paseos were usually mobile versions of the danzoneras or orquestas típicas that played in the dance halls or, sometimes, Spanish military bands (Pérez I 1988:106-7). Speaking of the 20th century, Brea and Millet (1993:196) add that "The paseos used [North American-style] Jazz Band orchestras, even though they have more drums and interpret popular current musical pieces." This usage of the word paseo to mean a type of comparsa should not be confused with the usage that signifies a parade of animal-drawn carriages or wagons (see above: "A typical 19th century Mamarrachos").

The second type was the conga, which was a “large conglomeration of dancers who, in an orderly, uniform manner, and dressed in accord with a selected theme, dance a rhythmic step in time with the accompanying instruments, which are almost always mainly percussion (drums: tumbas, quintos, and metal pans)" (Pérez I 1988:136). The congas were composed mainly of humble folk of scanty means; the paseos tended to be more lavish and required more capital. What the congueros lacked in material goods, they had to make up for in inventiveness. It was in the conga that the unique, characteristic music and dance of the Carnaval of Santiago de Cuba originated and evolved (see Conga).

== Attitude of the colonial authorities to the Mamarracho tradition ==
The colonial authorities usually tolerated the mamarrachos. Mamarrachos were forbidden at some times for these reasons: in 1788, because of “abuses,”(Pérez I 1988:30); in 1794, because of "...moral and physical damage that they produce..." (Pérez I 1988:30) in 1815, because of drunken coach-drivers and the mixing of classes where "...license is taken to insult any person whatsoever with indecent songs and sarcastic speech which cause fights...," (Pérez I 1988:34); in 1816, "...with the object of preventing the disorders and excesses that have been committed in previous years, eliminating forever horse races and so forth..." (Pérez I 1988:34); in 1820, for "fear of disorder" (Pérez I 1988:34); in 1823, (reason not given, Pérez I 1988:34) and in 1869, "...so that the tranquility that the city enjoys may not be disturbed." (Pérez I 1988:110-1)

Although tolerated, the mamarrachos were regulated (at least, on paper). In 1679, black slaves were not allowed to take part in comparsas whose members wore masks. Furthermore, black freedmen were the only ones who were not allowed to hide their faces with paint or masks. The reason given was that in preceding years, the opportunity of wearing a mask had given rise to violent settling of personal vendettas (Pérez I 1988:24). In a proclamation of 1841, the Spanish Governor forbade riding on horses or other animals in the paseo, driving vehicles fast during the paseo, the ridiculing of any person by means of speech, song or verse and the wearing of indecent costumes that could either offend public morality or make fun of other people. He also required the directors of comparsas to ask permission of the owners of homes before entering. Finally, law officers were admonished to arrest violators of the above regulations “without exception as to person” and also, to arrest any persons caught bearing offensive arms under their costumes (Pérez I 1988:36). The proclamation of 1846 (Pérez I 1988:36) essentially repeats the contents of that of 1841, as do also those of 1851 (Pérez I 1988:67-8), 1854 (Pérez I 1988:71-2), 1859 (Pérez I 1988:85-6), etc., until the end of the colonial period.

== Opposition to the Mamarrachos ==
Throughout its history, many Santiaguerans have called for regulation, reform or even abolition of the mamarrachos, which, until the 20th century, was a very spontaneous and unorganized celebration. In 1879, a motion was made in the Municipal Council with regards to the mamarrachos:

“The city councilor Don Francisco Mancebo presents a declaration to the municipal council in which he states that ‘the annual ancient days of popular diversion are approaching in Santiago de Cuba, but nowadays, these festivities are as ridiculous to the eyes of sensible people as they are baneful to the moral and material interests of the city and the region in general. That the diversion referred to is the masquerade or mamarrachos, as it is called here, is permitted on the days of St. John the Baptist, St. Peter, St. James and St. Anne, on which the people en masse and without distinction as to age, sex or color throw themselves into the public streets in dangerous confusion, at least with regards to their social relations, and, inebriated with the heat of those summer days, with the movement, the noise, the bustling and the uproar, with the music and the shameless African tango and the material abuse of alcoholic beverages, deliver themselves over to all manner of disorders, and declares that it is essential to completely prohibit them without fear or vacillation of any kind…’ (Pérez I 1988:111-2).

Three other city councillors presented a more moderate proposal in the form of a list of changes:

1. "That [the mamarrachos] should not be permitted on days other than those already fixed: St. John, St. Peter, St. James and St. Anne.
2. That the tumbas would be able to locate themselves in the northern part of the city, from Providencia (Los Maceos) Street to Concha Avenue; from east of Cuartel de Pardos Street to La Ronda (Trocha) Avenue from 12 o’clock midnight on.
3. That any dance that offends morality be suspended and the organizer be put at the disposition of the mayor.
4. That any masquerade that offends decency by its costumes, manners or speech be stopped.
5. That all the heads of the comparsas be obliged to deliver a list with the names of the persons that are to accompany them to the mayor’s office and that they be responsible for whatever lack of respect that may be shown." (Pérez I 1988:111-2)

This was the first attempt by citizens of Santiago (as opposed to colonial authorities) to impose order on the mamarrachos (Pérez I 1988:125, note 52).

While there were some who wanted to abolish the mamarrachos, there were others who, while not wishing to abolish it entirely, proposed that it should be purified.

“For some time our days of masquerades have been deteriorating. Much is said with respect to this and it has even been said that the new winds of progress which have blown over Cuba as a result of the conquest of liberty have put an end to these traditions.

Carnival is not a lack of culture. It can be made uncivilized. Surely. Who would dare in this respect to qualify as evil the carnival celebrations of Paris, of Nice, of Cologne and of other cities that are the honor and glory of civilization? Who would feel reactionary if they had the good fortune to take part in those battles of flowers where light, roses, beautiful women, perfumes and music delightfully and rapidly intoxicate the senses on the Parisian boulevards; in the enchanting streets lined, like perching doves, with the white houses of Nice? What we have to do is to reform, to civilize our masquerades, because we ought not to let these days of popular diversion disappear from among us, in a country that has suffered so much. In order to civilize our carnavales, they can and should eliminate those uncivilized mamarrachos who smear themselves with dirty shoe polish which is no longer even used on boots; they can and should eliminate certain African survivals with their cohorts of indecorous contortions; they can and should eliminate comparsas or masqueraders who chant immoral songs or attempt to represent immoral figures as well; they can and should, in brief, eliminate everything that might be coarse, dirty or deleterious to culture and to the state of progress of our country, while on the other hand, they should keep educating, socializing, and providing needed enlightenment to those who do these things. Who can do all this? The mayor, the municipal authorities, the priests of the people. That great citizen named Emilio Bacardí began the praiseworthy task which none of his successors in the mayor’s office have continued, I don’t know why. It would be desirable if, every year, when these celebrations arrive, something would be done about this subject that we have lightly touched on, instead of reproducing the canned proclamation which, from having been repeated since the time of Spanish domination, everyone now knows from memory. Let’s not eliminate the masquerades which gladden and satisfy society and the people, but try to keep reforming them.

So bring on the congenial days celebrated with spirit, joy, good manners and gladness (Pérez I 1988:183).

The above editorial, taken from La Independencia of July 24, 1908, touches on three interesting themes related to the mamarrachos: firstly, the author demonstrates the dogged admiration for all things European that lay at the root of the belief among some Hispano-Cubans that the mamarrachos was a kind of Venetian Carnival gone wrong. Secondly, the hoped-for purification of the mamarrachos would include the removal of African or Afro-Cuban elements. Finally, it seems that the authority figures preferred to limit their efforts at controlling and regulating the mamarrachos to issuing proclamations (see also the sections on opposition to the conga in the article on Conga).

== Winter Carnival vs. Summer Carnival ==
Mamarrachos were held well after the end of the zafra (sugar cane harvest) which runs from January to May. This meant that unemployed sugar cane workers, most of whom were African and mulatto slaves and freedmen, were able to participate, and probably had done so from a very early period in the history of Santiago. “Summer Carnival [mamarrachos] originally was intended as a period of rest and divertissement for the laborers (the Blacks) and was eventually nicknamed ‘Carnaval de las classes bajas’ (or Carnival of the lower classes)…” (Bettelheim 1993:105). Pérez (I 1988:21) states that the Spanish colonial authorities (in response to pressure from plantation owners) permitted the growth of the mamarrachos in order to distract the slaves (and freedmen, who were typically in sympathy with the slaves) from more subversive activities.

Today in Havana, Matanzas and Santiago de Cuba, Carnival is celebrated on July 18–27, in honor of the Revolution, with the final complete Carnival parade held on the 26th. This date commemorates Castro’s assault on the Moncada barracks in Santiago de Cuba on July 26, 1953, which had been planned to coincide with traditional Carnival in that city. Until the 1920s there were two types of Carnival celebrations in Santiago. When it was celebrated in relation to the Catholic calendar, carnival was held in February or March, during the several days prior to the Lenten period. It was called Winter Carnival and was private in nature, supported by certain organizations and their clubs like the Philharmonic Society, the Club San Carlos, the Club Catalonia, or the Club Galicia. These clubs were firmly rooted in Santiago social life by the 1860s. Membership was restricted and most of these organizations had their own buildings where members could meet, rehearse, and sponsor galas. Winter carnival was nicknamed “Carnaval por los blancos cubanos” (Carnaval for white Cubans), meaning Cubans with more Spanish than African heritage.

There was also a summer carnival, a Carnaval Santiaguero that originated during the slavery period. Held after the sugar and coffee harvest, it originally was intended as a period of rest and was eventually for the black laborers. And it nicknamed “Carnaval de las clases bajas” (Carnaval of the lower classes) or “Carnaval de los mamarrachos” which also coincided with the celebration of Santiago day on July 25.

By the 1920s Winter Carnaval celebrations were abandoned, and Summer Carnaval remained the only Carnaval in Santiago de Cuba. On Fridays, Saturdays, and Sundays during the month of June, everyone in Cuba knew one could go to Santiago to party. The major patrons of these summer festivities were local industries: Polar, La Cristal and Hatuey beers; Bacardi rum; and Eden tobacco. Many of the participants in Summer Carnaval were the newly unemployed sugar and coffee workers, who were quite willing to remain in Santiago after the harvest and work for their commercial patrons in the jobs that the festival season created. This combination- the unemployed and the commercial sponsor- contributed to the popularity of Summer Carnaval. During the 1940s and early 50s, Carnaval in both Santiago de Cuba and Havana became more commercialized.

A pre-Lenten carnival celebration is attested in Santiago from at least the first half of the 19th century (Pérez I 1988:38), but it was “private in nature, supported by certain organizations and their clubs, like the Philharmonic Society, the Club San Carlos, the Club Catalonia or the Club Galicia (Bettelheim 1993:105).” It was celebrated only by the well-to-do minority: “…Cubans with more Spanish than African heritage (Bettelheim 1993:105).” This carnival had all the elements that the purifiers desired (such as European-style masquerade balls) and fewer of the elements they disliked (such as Afro-Cubans, noisy percussion ensembles and “indecorous” dancing).

Carnaval de Invierno (“Winter Carnival”) is first recorded in 1904 (Pérez I 1988:167). This celebration, like the old pre-Lenten carnival, was held in February. In 1907, a Winter Carnival was celebrated with a “parade of carriages, an iridescent rain of flowers and confetti, noise in the park and crowds in the streets…”(Pérez I 1988:171). Winter Carnival continued to be promoted as a popular alternative to mamarrachos. It was held throughout the 1920s, but is mentioned no more after 1929 (Pérez I 1988:373-6). According to Pérez:

“The Winter Carnivals were created as ‘civilized’ counterparts to the traditional summer carnavales, in addition to which they adhered to the world-wide custom of celebrating carnival four days before the beginning of Lent. This was one more attempt to ‘civilize’ the traditional festival, but they did not last long because their nature was not collective, among other reasons (Pérez I 1988:168, note 2).”

The invention of the expression “carnaval(es) de invierno” to signify a revived or popularized pre-Lenten carnival led to a trend of referring to the mamarrachos as “carnavales de verano” (“Summer Carnivals”- see Pérez I 1988:171) in contrast. “Carnaval” eventually replaced other terms such as mamarrachos or mascaradas (Pérez I 1988:163, note 4). One angry Santiagueran complained about the change thusly;

“We have never called our traditional masquerades by the name “carnavales,” an improper name, the name of a religious festival which, according to the Catholic Church, is a period of time from the Day of the Kings until Ash Wednesday. Accordingly, it is incorrect to call them by the name carnavales; they should be called what we have always called them: Los Mamarrachos.”

In spite of the efforts of “writers, journalists and many traditionalist citizens,” the successive mamarrachos of July 24-6 became referred to as the “Carnaval of Santiago de Cuba (Pérez I 1988:31, note 3).”

== Posters representing Carnival of Santiago de Cuba ==
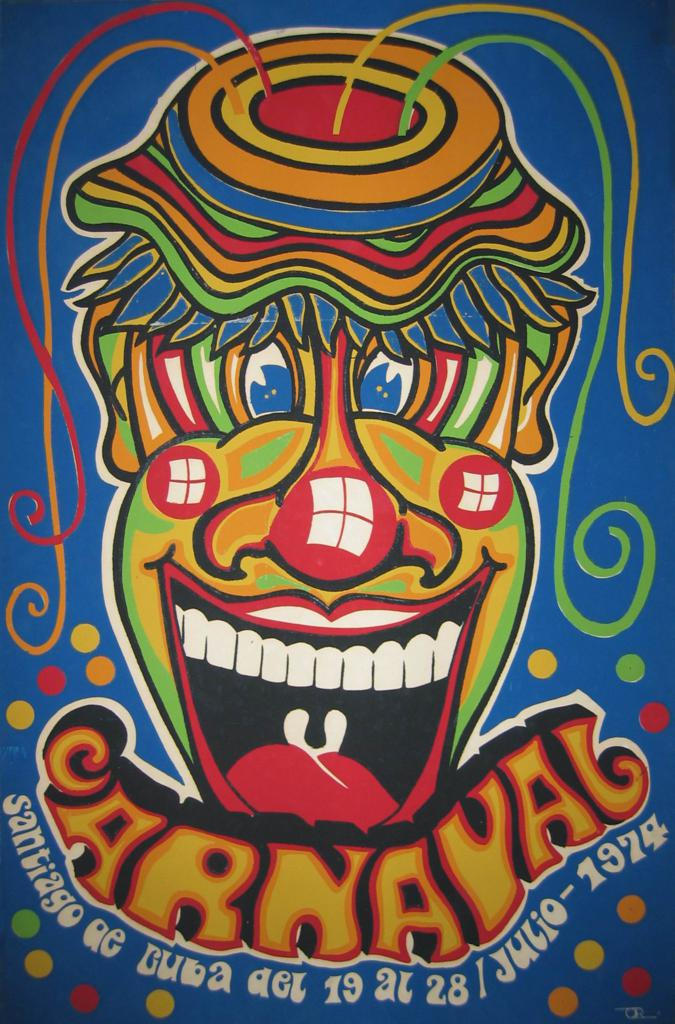
Carnival 1974

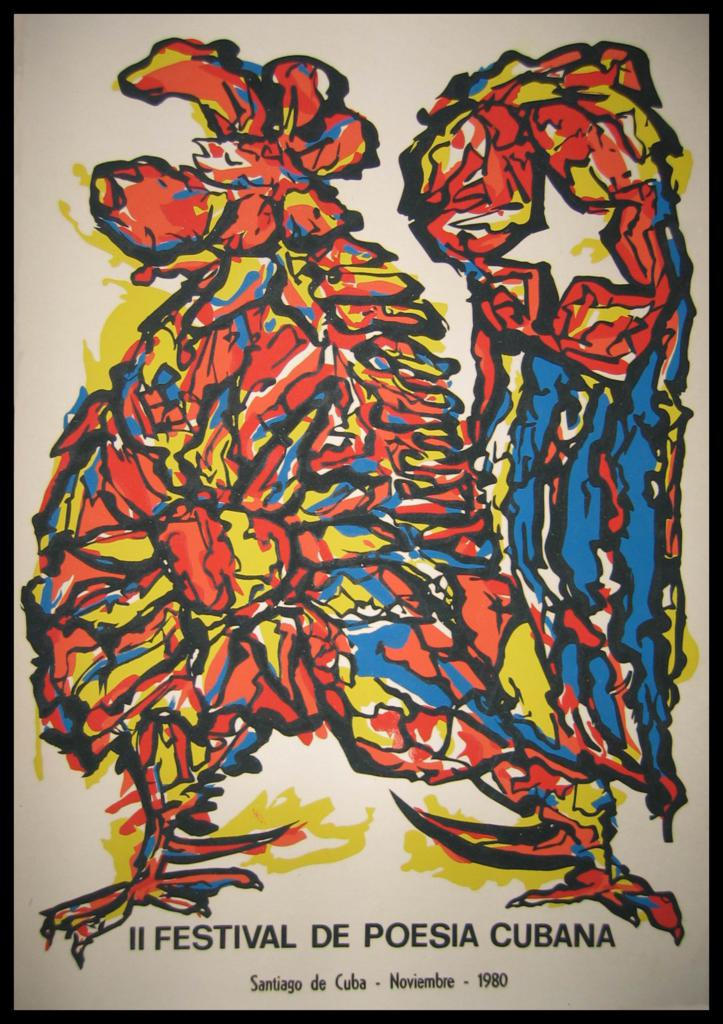
Carnival 1980

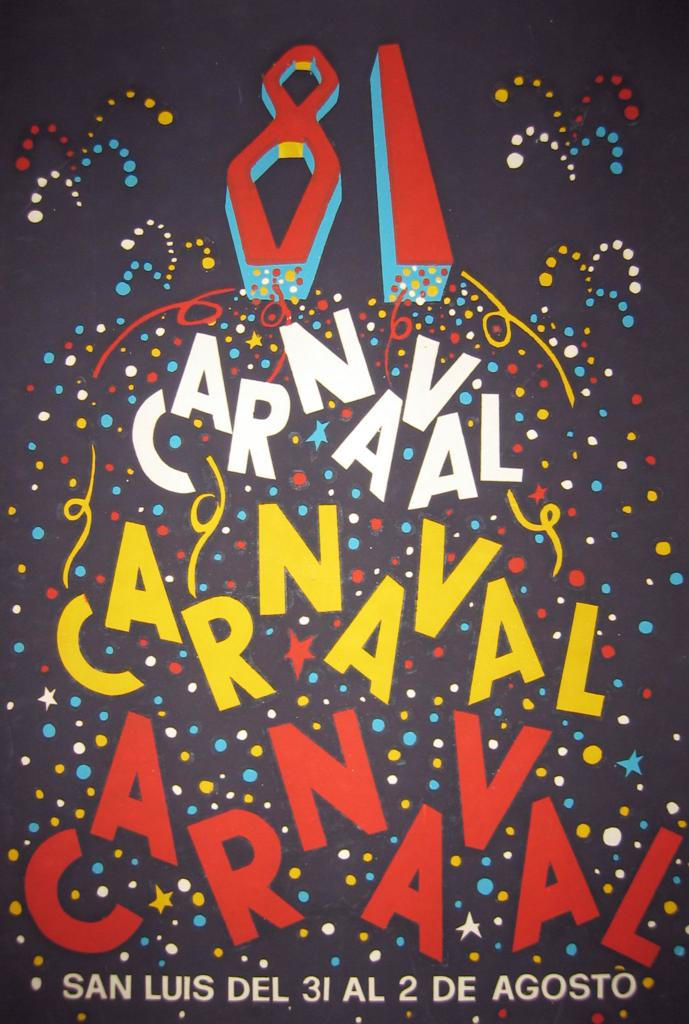
Carnival 1981

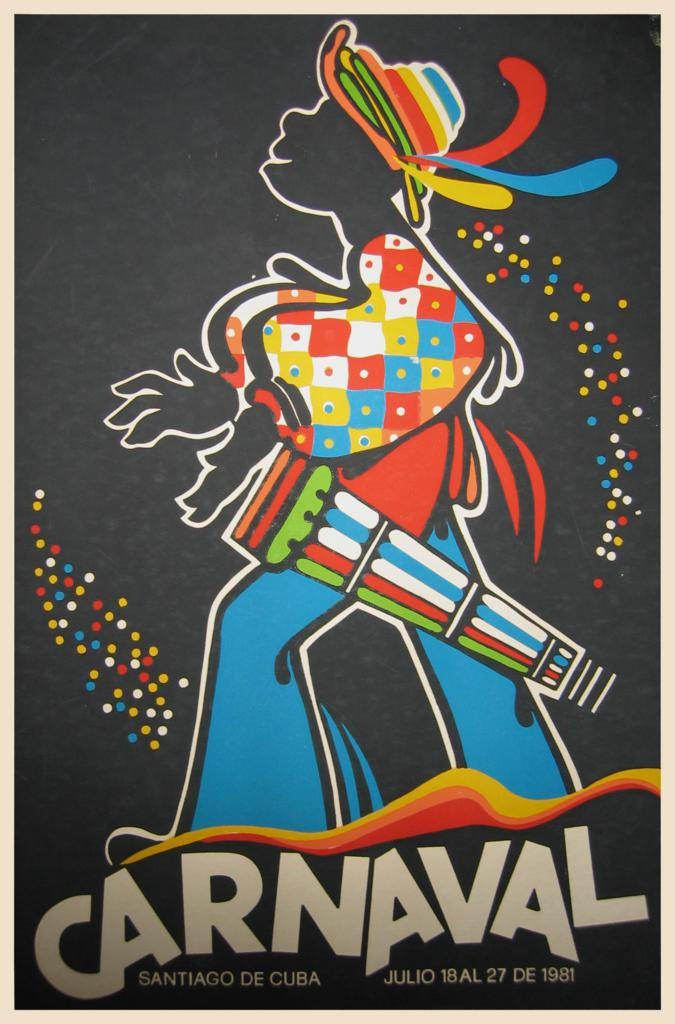
Carnival 1981

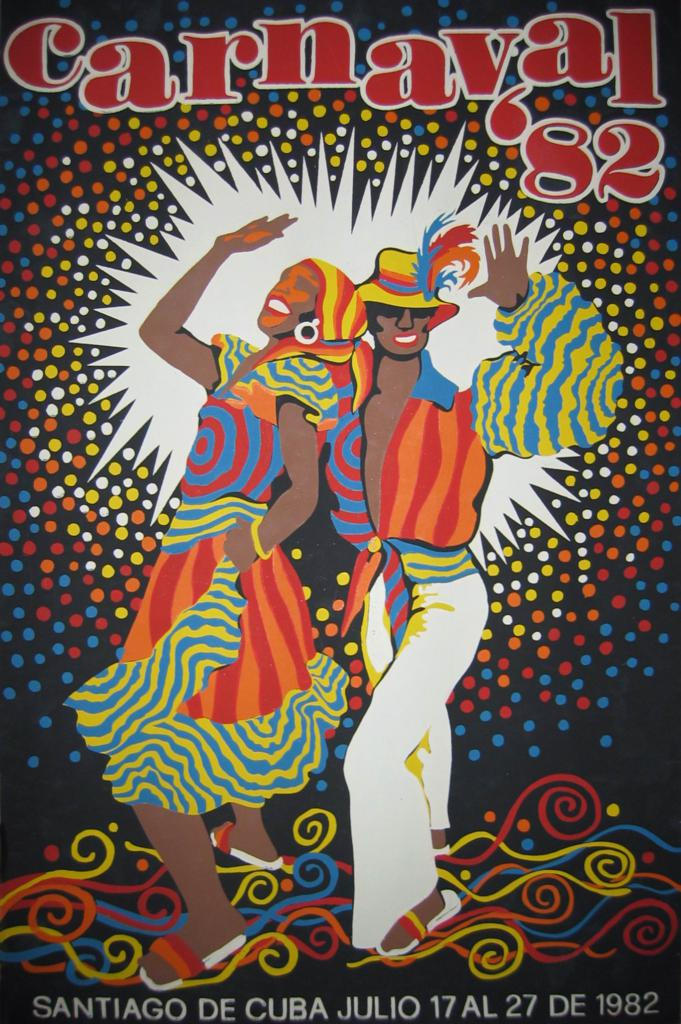
Carnival 1982

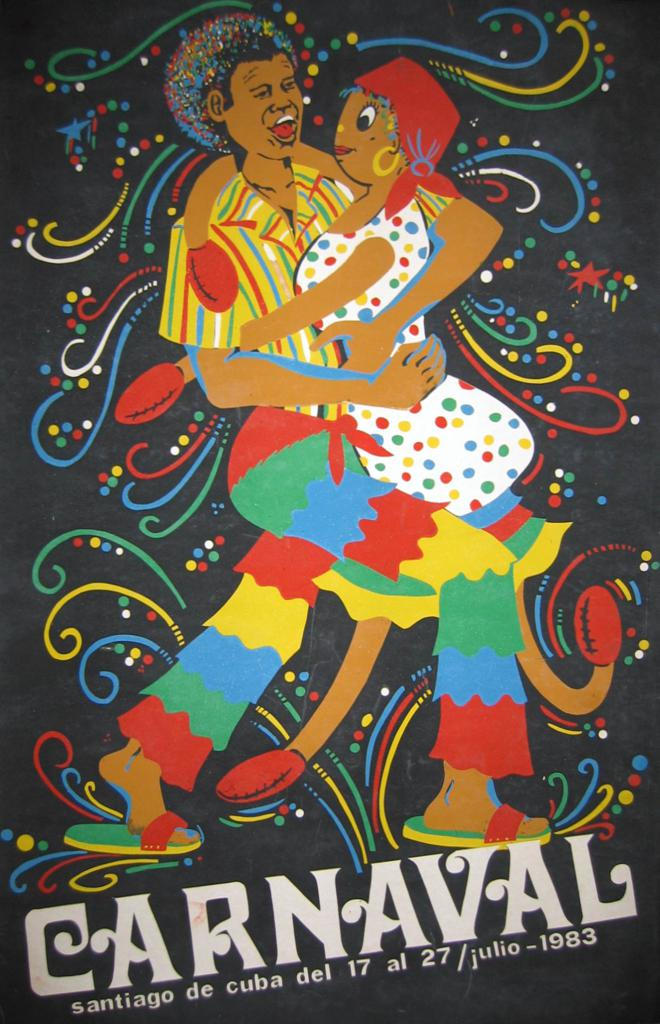
Carnival 1983

== See also ==
- Conga
- Santiago de Cuba
- Parrandas of Remedios, Cuba.

== Discography ==
- Carnaval à Santiago de Cuba; Le Chant du Monde LDX-A-4250
- Carnaval in Cuba; Folkways Records FW04065 (1981) - the Smithsonian Folkways catalog page for this item has samples of music from the Carnaval of Santiago de Cuba.
