= Comparsa =

Music genre and dance form

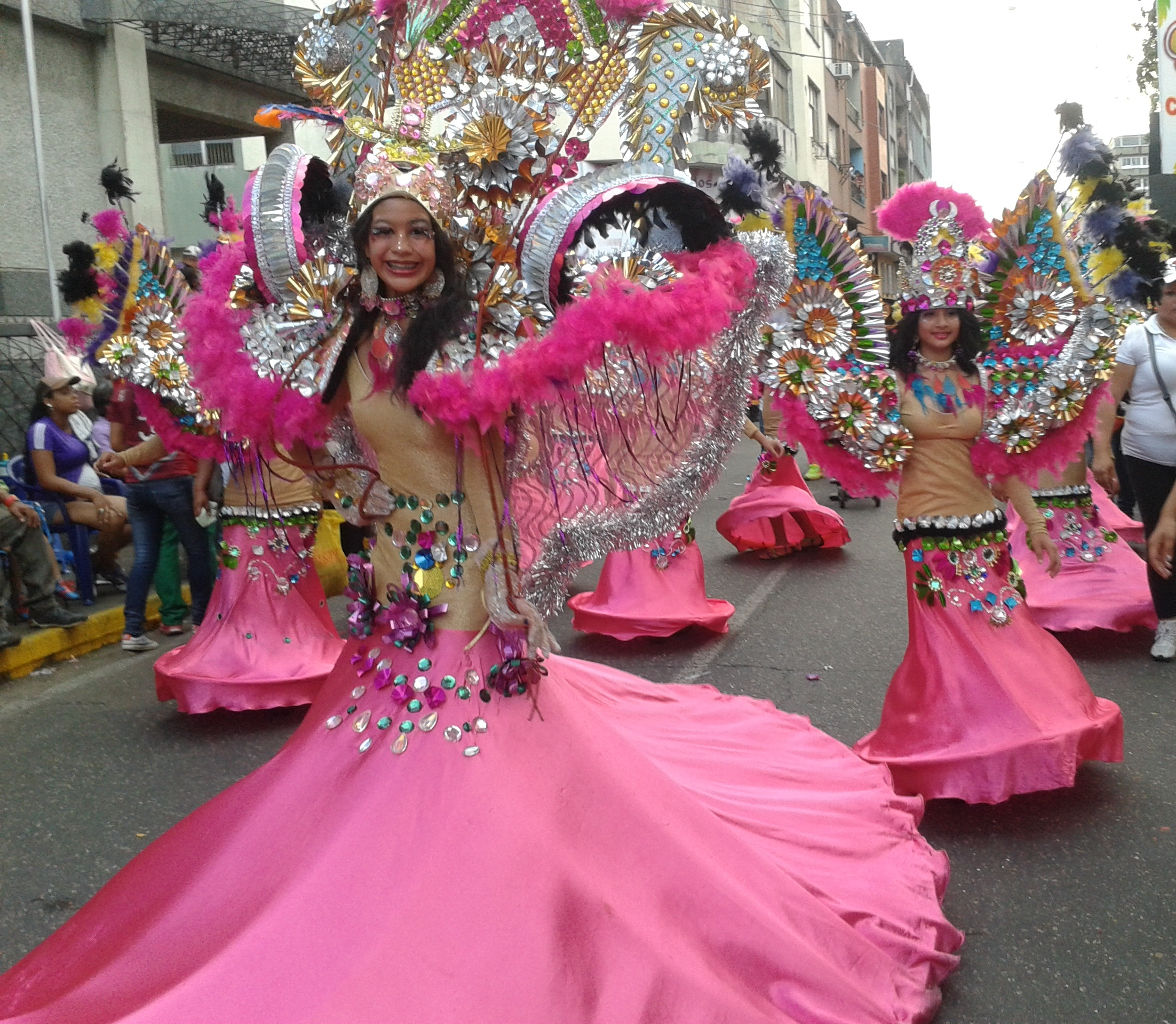
Comparsa on the streets of Maturín, Venezuela.

A comparsa is a group of singers, musicians and dancers that take part in carnivals and other festivities in Spain and Latin America. Its precise meaning depends on the specific regional celebration. The most famous comparsas are those that participate in the Carnival of Santiago de Cuba and Carnaval de Barranquilla in Colombia. In Brazil, comparsas are called carnival blocks, as those seen in the Carnival of Rio de Janeiro and other Brazilian carnivals. In the US, especially at the New Orleans Mardi Gras, comparsas are called krewes, which include floats.

== Spain ==
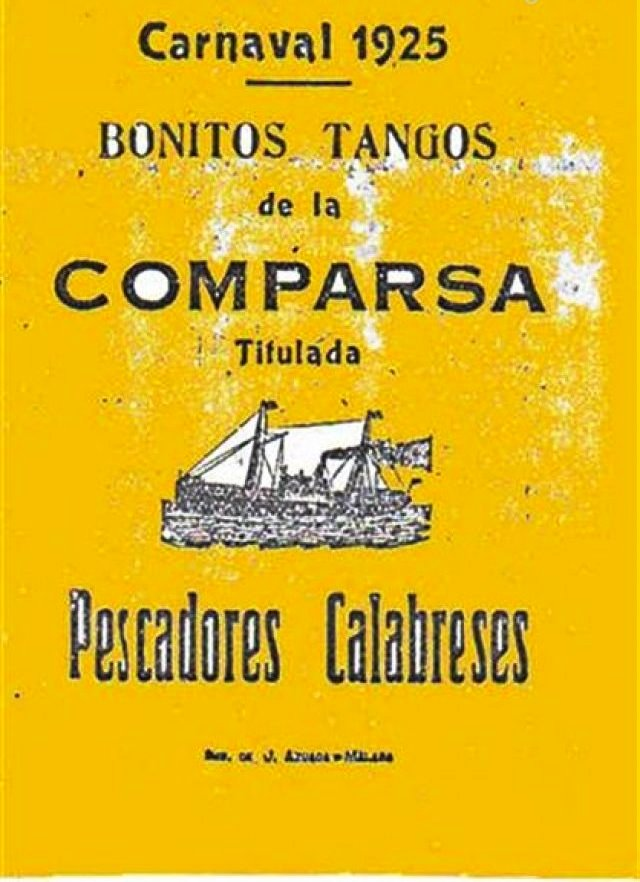
1925 book of songs by the Pescadores Calabreses comparsa from the Carnival of Málaga, Spain.

In Spain, the term comparsa can have different meanings depending on the celebration.

=== Cádiz ===
In Cádiz and other parts of Andalusia, comparsas are groups of singers that take part in carnivals, especially the Carnival of Cádiz. They sing comedy routines and the best comparsa is chosen in a contest. Other ensembles can also be found at the carnival, such as chirigotas, coros de carnaval, and cuartetos carnavalescos.

=== Santa Cruz de Tenerife ===
In the Carnival of Santa Cruz de Tenerife, comparsas are similar to Brazilian carnival blocks.

== Caribbean ==
=== Cuba ===
Cuban comparsas originate in the eastern part of the island, specifically in the streets of Santiago de Cuba. Comparsas are groups of singers, musicians and dancers. The singers and musicians form part of the conga, the ensemble that specifically plays the carnival music (a genre also called conga). The rest of the comparsa is formed by dancers with defined costumes and choreographies. Apart from the large Carnival of Santiago de Cuba, there is a carnival in Havana with slightly different customs. Famous comparsas from Santiago include Los Hoyos, Paso Franco, Guayabito, San Agustín, San Pedrito and Alto Pino. Famous comparsas from Havana include La Sultana, El Alacrán and Guaracheros de Regla. The unique thing about most Cuban comparsas is that the dancers, musicians, floats, etc. follow one after the other the agreed route through the streets of the cities where they are held.

=== Dominican Republic ===
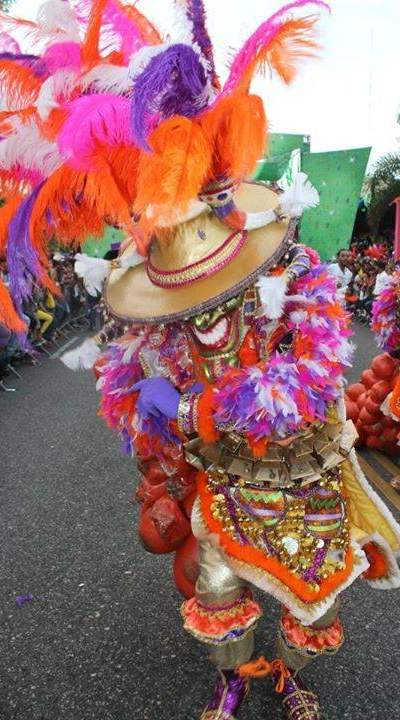
Diablo Cojuelo tradicional del carnaval Dominicano

Dominican Republic comparsas or troupes are dance groups choosing a traditionally festive or allegorical subject to typical Dominican things, organizing a presentation with costumes and mask. Diablo Cojuelo is the most popular character in the Dominican carnival and each province has unique elements.

=== Belize ===
Throughout the country, particularly in Corozal Town and San Pedro Town, comparsas are groups of street dancers which perform carnival season. The dancers dress up in traditional Mayan clothes.

== South America ==
=== Argentina ===
In Argentina, comparsas are very similar to the Brazilian carnival blocks, being followed by carriages.

=== Uruguay ===
In Uruguay, a comparsa makes reference to a group of candombe dancers and drummers.
