= Songs Bing Crosby recorded multiple times =

This is a list of Bing Crosby songs he recorded twice or more during his career, excluding all of the 1954 re-recordings for Bing: A Musical Autobiography.

== Christmas songs ==
=== Silent Night ===
Bing's holiday recordings began in 1935, when it was suggested that he record Silent Night and Adeste Fideles for the St. Columban Foreign Missionary Society. In a magazine article, Crosby gave the background to this.

"Late that year (1934), a missionary priest, Father Richard Ranaghan, came into the office of Crosby Enterprises. A member of the St. Columban Missionary Fathers, he had just come from their mission in China with a film showing the work done there. He planned to travel over the United States, showing the film in parish auditoriums to raise funds, and wanted to borrow some sound equipment to record a narration. No problem to this, and in the ensuing discussion, my brother Larry came up with an idea. “Bing,” he suggested, “why don’t you sing a couple ·of songs for the narration sound track?” Who suggested “Silent Night” and “Adeste Fideles” I do not know, only I do know it was not I. Very possibly it was the good padre himself. In any event, the whole incident was just that casual. No special vocal arrangements were worked out, no particular method of styling devised. I just sang the way I sang other songs. That the hymns were a far cry from the romantic ballads and popular tunes I was accustomed to singing and that they might possibly have called for a different approach never occurred to us. The sound track turned out pretty well, and Father was enthusiastic. Then Larry hit upon another bright idea—that we cut some records of “Silent Night” and “Adeste Fideles” from the sound track for Father to take along with him. He figured that some members of the audience might buy them and thus add to the fund. The records sold well, and both sides were played over the radio in several of the towns where the film was shown. Record shops began to get inquiries. Decca, learning of these requests, suggested I cut a master record of the two hymns for them. I sang the songs in exactly the same way, but with fuller orchestral backing. The record had all immediate sale. Letters began to come in, both congratulatory and critical. Not to my knowledge, however, were there ever any complaints from religious groups or from the clergy of any denomination. Most of the protests came from music teachers and music critics. They said that neither my voice nor my styling was suited to such spiritual songs. In answering the letters, I told the simple truth—that I had intended no sacrilege by singing in my usual ballad manner. I added that the record’s sale must have brought those two beautiful songs closer to many people who had not known them too well before. The explanation evidently satisfied the critics, for all but one wrote back friendly and understanding notes…"

Bing arranged for the profits from the record to be donated to charity.

- 2/21/1935 – Crosby made his first recording for St. Columban Foreign Missionary Society. It was released on CD in 1998.
- 11/13/1935 – Crosby made his second recording of the song on DLA 261 and this version charted in December 1935, December 1938 and December 1941. The disc was included in the Decca 78rpm album Christmas Music.
- 6/8/1942 – Crosby made another recording of the song and it was included on Bing's compilation holiday album Merry Christmas
- 3/19/1947 – Crosby made yet another recording of the song (the same day he re-recorded White Christmas) because Decca said that the master recordings for "White Christmas" and "Silent Night" had worn out because they stamped a lot of records. This was released in 1947 and went into the Billboard charts in December of that year. This version appears in all later incarnations of Merry Christmas.

=== White Christmas ===
White Christmas by far is Bing's biggest hit and the entire world's, since it has sold over 50 million copies; No song has ever come close to matching it. There are two versions of this song that were recorded in the studio and many outside of that used for TV and radio.

- 12/25/1941 – Crosby performed White Christmas live on a Christmas Day radio broadcast for NBC's Kraft Music Hall. The recording was thought to be lost but the estate of Bing Crosby owns a copy. It is unclear whether that is the original copy on a disc or a radio airwave scan.
- 5/29/1942 – Crosby first recorded White Christmas in the studio. It is stamped as Decca DLA 3009 on Disc 18429 with B-side Let's Start the New Year Right for the album Song Hits from Holiday Inn. An alternate copy recorded that same day was released in the 1998 compilation album Bing Crosby: The Voice of Christmas.
- 3/19/1947 – Crosby recorded White Christmas again because Decca said that the "original master recording wore out". This version would soon replace the 1942 version and would become the standard. The 1942 version, because of no stamper disc in reasonable condition, was never released on 45 rpm or LP records although it did appear in the 1998 compilation album Bing Crosby: The Voice of Christmas.

=== Sleigh Ride ===
- 11/17/1952 – Crosby recorded this Christmas song for the first time for Decca Records in 1952.
- September 1977 – Crosby re-recorded this track for his latest album, Seasons.

=== The Secret of Christmas ===
- 1959 – Bing recorded "The Secret of Christmas" in a studio version after performing the song in the 1959 movie Say One for Me.
- June 1964 – Crosby re-recorded this track for the album 12 Songs of Christmas, which he released with Frank Sinatra and Fred Waring.

== Popular songs ==
=== Too-Ra-Loo-Ra-Loo-Ral ===
- 7/7/1944 – Bing makes his first recording of the Too-Ra-Loo-Ra-Loo-Ral. It was matrix number L3456 on Disc 18621. It was a single, and soon became a million-seller.
- 7/17/1945 – Exactly one year and ten days later, due to mechanical difficulties with the first matrix, Crosby re-records the song for the album Selections from Going My Way. It was stamped as L3895 on Disc 18704.

=== Star Dust ===
Star Dust (sometimes spelled Stardust) is a song about love. It has over 1,500 recordings and is one of the most recorded songs of the 20th century. Bing Crosby made two main recordings during his career.

- 8/19/1931 – A very young Bing Crosby recorded the song first for Brunswick Records, stamped on disc 6169, with Dancing in the Dark as its B-side.
- 3/22/1939 – Bing recorded the classic for Decca this time around, stamped as matrix # DLA 1733 on Disc 23285. An album was made based upon the song in 1940.

=== Where the Blue of the Night (Meets the Gold of the Day) ===
Coming into radio during the early 1930s, Crosby felt he needed a theme song. He co-wrote Where the Blue of the Night Meets the Gold of the Day and performed it as the theme for many of his radio show series. He made several recordings in the studio to be public releases with different record labels.

- 11/23/1931 – While recording under Brunswick, Crosby makes his first recording of his theme song.
- 7/20/1940 – Bing makes his second recording, the first for Decca in 1940.
- 7/17/1945 – Second recording for Decca, L3897, often mislabeled as 1948 version

=== Wrap Your Troubles in Dreams ===
Shortly after leaving Paul Whiteman's band, The Rhythm Boys broke up because Crosby was beginning to be featured more and more on his own. Bing recorded Wrap Your Troubles in Dreams with Gus Arnheim and His Cocoanut Grove Orchestra.

- 3/2/1931 – Bing records the song with Gus Arnheim and his Cocoanut Grove Orchestra.
- 6/9/1939 – Crosby waxes the record for Decca this time around, DLA 1767.
- 6/9/1939 – A fluff take 'C' got out of the studio where Crosby joked "... he cut out eight bars, the dirty bastard...", "And I didn't know which eight bars he was gonna cut", "Why don't someone tell me these things around here.... holy christ I'm going off my nut". The version has been all over the media and countless bootleg pressings have been made of it. That version was released in the soundtrack to Bing Crosby Rediscovered, a documentary by American Masters.

=== June in January ===
- 11/9/1934 – Bing Crosby recorded this track for the first time in a studio version. The singer sang this song in the movie Here Is My Heart, and also placed it on his compilation album Crosbyana from 1941.
- September 1977 – Crosby re-recorded this track for his latest album, Seasons.

=== April Showers ===
- 4/17/1956 – the singer recorded this track for his studio album Songs I Wish I Had Sung the First Time Around released by Decca Records.
- September 1977 – Crosby re-recorded this track for his latest album, Seasons.

=== Amapola ===
- 6/22/1960 – Bing recorded this track for his studio album El Señor Bing.
- 1965 – Crosby recorded this song for the 1966 album Bing Crosby's Treasury – The Songs I Love.
- March 1968 – re-recording song for the 1968 album Bing Crosby's Treasury – The Songs I Love.
- 1975 – Bing re-recorded this song and included it on his 1977 album Bingo Viejo.

=== The Rose in Her Hair ===
- 6/22/1960 – Bing recorded this track for his studio album El Señor Bing.
- July 1976 – Bing re-recorded this track and included it on his studio album titled Feels Good, Feels Right.

=== The Breeze and I ===
- 1965 – Crosby recorded this song for the 1966 album Bing Crosby's Treasury – The Songs I Love.
- March 1968 – Re-recording song for the 1968 album Bing Crosby's Treasury – The Songs I Love.
- 1975 – Bing re-recorded this song and included it on his 1977 album Bingo Viejo.

=== Heat Wave ===
- 2/11/1956 – Crosby recorded this song with the Buddy Bregman Orchestra and included it on the Bing Sings Whilst Bregman Swings album.
- February 1975 – Re-recording for United Artists in February at Chappells Studios, London. This version was featured on the At My Time of Life album.

=== A Couple of Song and Dance Men ===
- 7/24/1946 – Bing first recorded this song with Fred Astaire after they performed it together in the film Blue Skies.
- July 1975 – Re-recording of the piece, also with Fred Astaire, at the Music Center in Wembley, London. This version was included on the album A Couple of Song and Dance Men.

=== On the Alamo, Georgia on My Mind, Alabamy Bound ===
- August 1955 – August 1956 – Bing recorded these songs with the accompaniment of Buddy Cole. These versions were on the New Tricks album from 1957.
- 1/16/1975 – Crosby re-recorded these songs for his studio album A Southern Memoir.

=== Little Green Apples ===
- November 1968 – Bing Crosby recorded this track for the first time while recording his album Hey Jude/Hey Bing!.
- 1972 – Crosby re-recorded "Little Green Apples" with Count Basie Orchestra for the album Bing 'n' Basie.
