= El Señor Bing =

Studio album by Bing Crosby
- Released: 1961
- Recorded: June 22–23, 1960
- Genre: Vocal
- Label: MGM Records
- Producer: Simon Rady

Bing Crosby chronology
101 Gang Songs (1961)	El Señor Bing (1961)	My Golden Favorites (1961)

El Señor Bing is the twenty-eighth solo studio album by American singer and actor Bing Crosby for his own company, Project Records. It was released by MGM Records (E-3890P) in October, 1961. The album consists of ten tracks each consisting of two songs set to a Latin American rhythm. Billy May & his Orchestra provided the musical accompaniment. The album was later issued under the title "Bing Goes Latin" MGM Records – 2354 028.

The entire album was re-released in 2010 in CD form by Collectors' Choice Music (CCM2108), with additional tracks. All the original tracks from the album were included in both stereo and mono mixes.

== Reception ==
Billboard (magazine) reviewed the album saying “Crosby is in good voice on this package of swingy standards, arranged and cut by Billy May and recorded by Crosby’s Project Records, Inc., for release on the MGM label. The album features Latin treatments of 20 great oldies — each fine deejay programming — including “In the Still of the Night,” “Marta,” “Again,” “Ramona” and “Cuban Love Song”."

Frank Murphy, writing in the fan club magazine, Crosby Post, said: "And finally we come to EL SENOR BING, that long awaited LP from MGM which has at last made its appearance. This is one of Bing’s very rare solo LPs these days. Bing likes to hide himself away in choruses and with other artistes just now, and whoever persuaded him to make this solo album is deserving of deepest gratitude and thanks. Here is Bing we love to hear, all by himself, and with a batch of great standards."

== Track listing ==
Side one
No.	Title	Writer(s)	Length
1.	"In the Still of the Night" "I Could Have Danced All Night"	Cole Porter; Frederick Loewe, Alan Jay Lerner	3:04
2.	"C'est Magnifique" "Taking a Chance on Love"	Cole Porter; Vernon Duke, John La Touche, Ted Fetter	2:00
3.	"Heavenly Night" "My Shawl"	Sebastián Iradier, Neil Wilson; Xavier Cugat, Stanley Adams	2:53
4.	"Marta, Rambling Rose of the Wildwood" "The Rose in Her Hair"	Moises Simons, L. Wolfe Gilbert; Harry Warren, Al Dubin	2:43
5.	"How High the Moon" "Old Devil Moon"	Nancy Hamilton, Morgan Lewis; Burton Lane, E.Y. Harburg	2:38

Side two
No.	Title	Writer(s)	Length
1.	"Pagan Love Song" "Cuban Love Song"	Arthur Freed, Nacio Herb Brown; Dorothy Fields, Jimmy McHugh, Herbert Stothart	2:30
2.	"Ramona" "Amapola"	L. Wolfe Gilbert, Mabel Wayne; José María Lacalle García, Albert Gamse	2:42
3.	"Malaguena (At the Crossroads)" "Andalucia (The Breeze and I)"	Ernesto Lecuona; Ernesto Lecuona. Emilio de Torre, Al Stillman	2:34
4.	"Down Argentina Way (Mack Gordon, Harry Warren)" "What a Diff'rence a Day Made"	Mack Gordon, Harry Warren; María Grever, Stanley Adams	2:50
5.	"Again" "Allez-Vous-En"	Lionel Newman, Dorcas Cochran; Cole Porter	2:28

== Personnel as listed on Collectors' Choice Music CD ==
Joe Howard, Dick Nash, Lloyd Ulyate (trombones); Johnny Best, Conrad Green, Uan Rasey (trumpets); Willie Schwartz, Ted Nash (alto saxophone); Justin Gordon, Julius Jacobs (tenor saxophone); Justin Gordon (soprano saxophone); Julius Jacobs (oboe, English horn); Ralph Penna (bass); Alvin Stoller (drums); Al Hendrickson (guitar); Buddy Cole (piano); Jud Conlon Rhythmaires (Loulie Jean Norman, Mac McLean and Charlie Parlato) (chorus).
