= Bingo Viejo =

Studio album by Bing Crosby
- Released: March 1977
- Recorded: June 23, September 15, 1975
- Genre: Vocal
- Label: London (SHU 8499) / Anahuac (ANC-3901)
- Producer: Bing Crosby

Bing Crosby chronology
Beautiful Memories (1977)	Bingo Viejo (1977)	Seasons (1977)

Bingo Viejo is the forty-fourth solo studio album by American singer and actor Bing Crosby, recorded by Crosby at his own expense during two sessions in 1975 at United Recorders, Hollywood. "Viejo" means "old" in Spanish. He was accompanied by Paul Smith and his Orchestra. Crosby, who called the LP his "Mexican album", leased the tracks to the English branch of Decca following negotiations with producer Geoff Milne and the album was issued on Decca's London label.

He also leased the tracks to a US-based label called Anahuac. They remixed the tracks and used some alternate takes (tracks 6, 7, 9 and 10). Crosby himself felt that this improved the album and he wrote to his friend Leslie Gaylor in a letter dated July 11, 1977. "The Bingo Viejo record has been remixed and it sounds much better than ever it did before. I don't know what they did to it but they brought up the vocal a little more and cut down on the background, which made it sound a little more intimate and a little more personal."

The album has never been issued on CD.

== Reception ==
The UK magazine The Gramophone reviewed the album saying: "Bingo Viejo" by old Bing Crosby himself is a typically warm Crosbyian salute to south of the border with ten songs sung in English and Spanish which will undoubtedly please his numerous adherents of either tongue. The numbers are mostly familiar ones like Green Eyes, Besame Mucho, Frenesi and The Breeze and I, and the arrangements are less than impressive, particularly the messy accompaniment for Amapola, which almost undermined the Old Groaner's customary vocal serenity."

Record producer, Ken Barnes, felt that the album was a less successful effort than A Southern Memoir and he considered that the "main fault lies in the choice of some of the songs—notably ‘The Breeze and I’ and especially ‘Spanish Eyes’ which were clearly too rangy for any septuagenarian to sing, although sing them he does."

== Track listing ==
SIDE ONE

No.	Title	Writer(s)	Length
1.	"Maria Bonita"	Agustín Lara, Bobby Worth	2:40
2.	"Green Eyes"	Adolfo Utrera, Nilo Menéndez, Eddie Woods, Eddie Rivera	3:15
3.	"Amapola"	Joseph M. LaCalle, Albert Gamse	4:19
4.	"Bésame Mucho"	Consuelo Velázquez, Sunny Skylar	3:39
5.	"Cuando calienta el sol"	Carlos Martinoli, Carlos Rigual, Mario Rigual	3:07

SIDE TWO

No.	Title	Writer(s)	Length
6.	"Eres tú"	Juan Carlos Calderón, Jay Livingston, Ray Evans	3:54
7.	"La Borrachita"	I. Fernandez Esperon, Al Stewart	3:30
8.	"Frenesí"	Alberto Domínguez, Leonard Whitcup	3:25
9.	"Spanish Eyes"	Bert Kaempfert, Charlie Singleton, Eddie Snyder	2:55
10.	"The Breeze and I"	Ernesto Lecuona, Al Stillman	3:03
