= Edmundo Ros =

Trinidadian-Venezuelan vocalist and bandleader (1910–2011)

Edmundo Ros OBE, FRAM
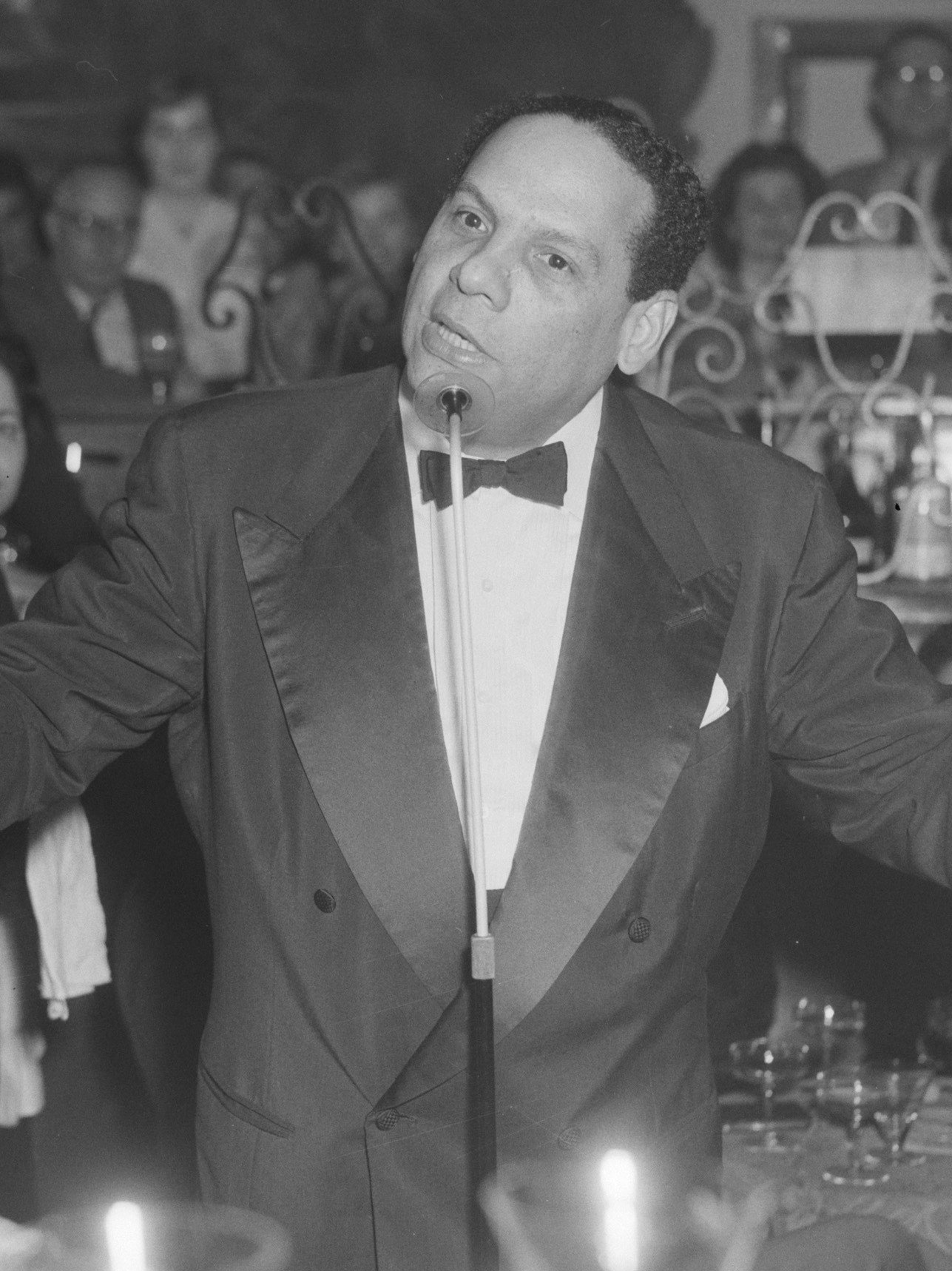
- Edmundo Ros in 1957

Background information
- Born: Edmund William Ross; 7 December 1910; Port of Spain, Trinidad
- Died: 21 October 2011 (aged 100); Alicante, Spain
- Genre: Latin American
- Occupations: Musician; vocalist; band leader
- Years active: 1940-2010
- Labels: Parlophone, Decca (UK); London (US and Canada)

Edmundo Ros (7 December 1910 – 21 October 2011), born Edmund William Ross, was a Trinidadian-Venezuelan musician, vocalist, arranger and bandleader who made his career in Britain. He directed a highly popular Latin American orchestra, had an extensive recording career and owned one of London's leading nightclubs.

== Early life ==
Edmund William Ross was born in Port of Spain, Trinidad. His mother, Luisa Urquart, was a Venezuelan teacher, thought to be descended from indigenous Caribs, and his father, William Hope-Ross, was a mulatto of Scottish descent. He was the eldest of four children, having two sisters, Ruby and Eleanor, followed by a half-brother, Hugo. His parents separated after Hugo was born, and after various false steps Edmund was enrolled in a military academy. There he became interested in music and learned to play the euphonium and percussion. When his mother became involved with a man he loathed and had a son by him, the 17-year-old left for Caracas, Venezuela, to study at the Academy of Music under Vicente Emilio Sojo.

He played drums in the city's nightclubs and in the Martial Band of Caracas, and he was soon hired by Sojo as timpanist in the new Venezuela Symphony Orchestra. As his obituary in The Guardian noted: "His local name, 'Edmundo Ros', launched a lasting myth that he was Venezuelan." Later he received a music scholarship from the Venezuelan government of Eleazar Lopez Contreras, and, from 1937 to 1942, studied harmony, composition and orchestration at the Royal Academy of Music. At the same time he was the vocalist and percussionist in Don Marino Barreto's band at the Embassy Club, and also recorded several sides as a sideman to Fats Waller, who was visiting London in 1938.

== Orchestra ==
In August 1940, Ros formed his own orchestra, performing as Edmundo Ros and His Rumba Band in the style of Lecuona Cuban Boys directed by Armando Oréfiche. In 1941 he cut his first tracks with Parlophone, the first number being "Los Hijos de Buda". The band played regularly at the Coconut Grove club in Regent Street, attracting members of London's high society and royal family.

Ros's bands were always based in London nightclubs or restaurants. The first was the Cosmo Club in Wardour Street; then followed the St Regis Hotel, Cork Street, the Coconut Grove and the Bagatelle Restaurant, that opened the doors for Ros and high society. All the leaders of Allied Countries in World War II and the Royal Family came there to dine and listen to Edmundo's Rumba Band. At the Bagatelle a visit from Princess Elizabeth and party made his name. The future queen danced in public for the first time to Edmundo's music. By then, with his gently rhythmic style and engaging vocals, he was enormously popular with the public generally, and his orchestra was often invited to play at Buckingham Palace.

Ros’s popularity escalated in postwar Britain through live radio concerts, produced by Cecil Madden.

By 1946 Ros owned a club, a dance school, a record company and an artistes' agency. His band grew to 16 musicians and was renamed Edmundo Ros and His Orchestra. the same year Ros were featured in the film What Do We Do Now?.

In 1948, he supported Carmen Miranda for a year at the London Palladium, while still playing the Coconut Grove, and the following year The Wedding Samba sold three million 78s. in Britain and entered the US charts.

In 1950, King George VI invited him to perform at Windsor castle, and he took his fiancée, the beautiful Swedish aristocrat Britt Johansen, whom he married that year. In 1950 the Nigerian Ginger Johnson joined the Edmundo Ros Orchestra as its lead percussionist, and recorded several albums with the band.

In 1951 Ros bought the Coconut Grove on Regent Street that became popular for its atmosphere and music. In 1958 his album Rhythms of The South was one of the first high-quality LP stereo records: it sold a million copies. He was with Decca Records from 1944 to 1974, and altogether he made more than 800 recordings. During the 1950s and 1960s the Ros orchestra appeared frequently on BBC Radio, continuing into the early 1970s on Radio Two Ballroom.

In the early 1960s, he collaborated with the Ted Heath Orchestra on the album Heath versus Ros (Decca Phase 4 Stereo 1964) that exploited the relatively new stereo recording process. In 1964 renamed the Coconut Grove as Edmundo Ros's Dinner and Supper Club but one year later closed when legalised casino gambling had drawn away many of its best customers.

In the mid-1960s, the French singer Caterina Valente worked with Edmundo Ros orchestra and recorded material in Portuguese, Spanish and English that Ros arranged/conducted and/or composed on the Decca and London labels.

The shift in musical tastes to rock music bands affected Ros's career, but he played on into the 1970s. In 1975, during Ros's seventh tour of Japan, his band's Musicians' Union shop steward tried to usurp Ros's authority by making arrangements with venues behind his back. Upon their return to the UK Ros organised a celebratory dinner after a BBC recording session and announced the disbanding of the orchestra. He destroyed almost all the charts (arrangement sheets), which conclusively ended the orchestra's existence.

In 1994, Edmundo conducted and sang with the BBC Big Band with Strings at the Queen Elizabeth Hall in London. The other conductor was Stanley Black.

== Affiliations and honours ==
Ros joined the entertainment fraternity the Grand Order of Water Rats on October 4, 1964. A year and a half later he was made a Freeman of the City of London, having been admitted to the Freedom of the Worshipful Company of Poulters on 5 January 1965. He was a Freemason, initiated into the Chelsea Lodge No 3098 and a Founder Member and Worshipful Master of Lodge of Ascension No 7358; on retirement a member of Sprig of Acacia Lodge No 41, Javea, Spain.

He became a Fellow of the Royal Academy of Music in 1991.

In the 2000 New Year Honours Ros received the Officer of the Order of the British Empire (OBE). He turned 100 on 7 December 2010.

== Personal life ==
Ros married twice. He and his first wife Britt Johansen married in 1950 and had two children. He designed and built a large house in London, Mill Hill which he named Edritt House after himself and his first wife. He married his second wife, Susan, in 1971.

== Death ==
Ros retired and moved to Jávea, Alicante, Spain. He died on 21 October 2011, shortly before his 101st birthday.

== Discography ==
=== 78s (reissued on Harlequin CDs) ===
This set of ten CDs includes all the known 78s recorded up to and including 1951; the source material was the 78 rpm collection of Christian af Rosenborg; the notes were by Pepe Luhtala; the remastering by Charlie Crump. The series was never completed, but most of the later Ros material is available on LP or CD. Some of the Harlequin series is available on Naxos. Although the title of these CDs calls his group the Rumba Band, in the post-war period it expanded to 16 members, and was known as Edmundo Ros and his Orchestra.

- Edmundo Ros and his Rumba Band, 1939–41, Harlequin CD 15. Includes about 8 minutes of Edmundo Ros discussing the early days of his career.
- Tropical Magic: Edmundo Ros and his Rumba Band, vol 2, 1942–44. Harlequin CD 50. Includes four sets of Edmundo Ros continuing his autobiographic reminiscences.
- Cuban Love Song: Edmundo Ros and his Rumba Band, vol 3, 1945. Harlequin CD 73.
- Chiquita Banana: Edmundo Ros and his Rumba Band, vol 4, 1946–47. Harlequin CD 105.
- La Comparsa: Edmundo Ros and his Rumba Band, vol 5, 1948. Harlequin CD 129.
- Chocolate Whisky and Vanilla Gin: Edmundo Ros and his Rumba Band, vol 6, 1948–49. Harlequin CD 147.
- Mambo Jambo: Edmundo Ros and his Rumba Band, vols 7 & 8, 1949–50. Harlequin CD 164/165.
- Playtime in Brazil: Edmundo Ros and his Orchestra, vols 9 & 10, 1951. Harlequin CD 180/181.

=== 10" LPs ===
Decca issued an initial series of 33 rpm 10-inch LPs in the early 1950s, consisting of previously issued 78 rpm sides. Labels were Decca (UK and Commonwealth) and London (a subsidiary) in the US and Canada.

- Latin-American Rhythms, Edmundo Ros and his Rumba Band, Decca LF 1002. Latin Rhythms, Edmundo Ros and his Orchestra, London 155, is identical in content.
- Mambo with Ros. Decca LF 1038, and London LPB 341.
- Samba with Ros. Decca LF, and London LB 367.
- Latin-American Rhythms with Ros. Decca LP 1051, and London LPB 368.
- Ros presents Calypsos. Decca LF 1067, and London LB 367.
- Dance the Samba. Decca LF 1126, and London LB 742.

=== 12" LPs ===
Three labels, all owned by Decca: Decca in the UK and the Commonwealth as well as London and its cut-price reissue label Richmond High Fidelity in the United States and Canada.

- Latin-American Novelties (London LL 1090)
- Ros Mambos (London LL 1092, Decca 1956)
- Latin Melodies (London LL 1093)
- Ros Album of Sambas (London LL 1117), Richmond B 20032 has same content, but only 10 numbers where Decca/London has 14.
- Ros Album of Calypsos (Decca LK 4102, 1956)
- Ros Album of Baions (Decca LK 4111), one side baiãos; the other boleros.
- Mambo Party (Richmond B 20022)
- Latin Carnival (Richmond B 20023)
- Rhythms of the South (Decca 1958)
- Calypso Mania (Decca 1958)
- Perfect for Dancing (Decca 1958)
- Hi-Fiesta Perfect for Dancing (London LL3000)
- Ros on Broadway (London PS110 1957, Decca 1959)
- Hollywood Cha Cha Cha (Decca 1959)
- Dancing With Edmundo (Decca LK 4353, 1960)
- Fire & Frenzy (London sw 99019, 1960), with singing by Caterina Valente
- Bongos From the South (Decca 1961)
- Song 'N Clap Along With Edmundo Ros (London PS 226, 1961)
- Sing Along Clap Along With Ros on Broadway (Decca LK 4388, 1961)
- Dancing With Ros (London FFSS PS 205, 1961)
- Samba! (Richmond B 20032, 1962)
- Dance Again (Decca 1962)
- Sing and Dance with Edmundo Ros (Decca SKL 4526, 1963)
- Heath versus Ros (Decca Phase 4, 1964) with Ted Heath
- Caterina Valente com Edmundo Ros (London LLN-7058, 1964), with singing by Caterina Valente
- Latein Amerikanische Rhythmen (Decca 1964), with singing by Caterina Valente
- Sing and Dance with Edmundo Ros (Decca SKL 4885, 1967)
- Heath versus Ros, Round Two (Decca Phase 4, 1967)
- Japanese Military Songs (London SLC-223, 1968)
- Hair Goes Latin (Decca 1969)
- Heading South of the Border (Decca Phase 4, 1970)
- This is My World (Decca 1972)
- Caribbean Ros (Decca 1974)
- Ros Remembers (Decca 1974)
- Sunshine and Olé! (London Phase 4, 1976)
- Edmundo Ros Today (Decca 1978)
- Show Boat/Porgy & Bess (LP)
- Ros at the Opera
- Broadway goes Latin
- New Rhythms of the South
- Latin Boss...Señor Ros
- Arriba
- Latin Hits I Missed
- The Latin King
- This is My World
- Give My Regards to Broadway
- That Latin Sound
- Latin Favourites (Gold Crown 1979)
- Latin Song and Dance Men (Pye 1980)
- Music For the Millions (Decca 1983)
- Strings Latino (London 1985)
- Latin Magic (London 1987)
- That Latin Sound (Pulse 1997)
- Doin' the Samba, CD
- Rhythms of the South/New Rhythms of the South, CD
- Good! Good! Good! CD
- Strings Latino/Latin Hits I Missed CD
