= Bing Crosby's Treasury – The Songs I Love =

Bing Crosby's Treasury - The Songs I Love

Studio album by Bing Crosby
- Released: 1966
- Recorded: November 30, December 2, 1965
- Genre: Traditional pop
- Label: Longines Symphonette Society
- Producer: Eugene Lowell

Bing Crosby chronology
The Summit (w/ Dean Martin, Frank Sinatra and Sammy Davis Jr.) (1966)	Bing Crosby's Treasury - The Songs I Love (1966)	Bing Crosby and The Columbus Boychoir Sing Family Christmas Favorites (w/ The Columbus Boychoir) (1967)

Bing Crosby's Treasury – The Songs I Love is the thirty-fourth solo studio album by American singer and actor Bing Crosby, It was an LP set recorded in 1965 and issued by a mail-order firm, The Longines Symphonette Society, an educational service of the Longines-Wittnauer Watch Company.

== Background ==
This was a six LP album comprising eighty-four tunes chosen by Bing Crosby, twelve of which he had recorded: the remaining tracks were orchestral. He also recorded a radio promotional disc on which, introduced by Frank Knight, he extolled the merits of the selected songs. On each side of all six LP's there was included one Crosby recording and with the set there was an additional free "souvenir" LP ("Bing Crosby's All Time Hit Parade") which consisted of four more Crosby recordings and eight orchestral tracks. All this, of course, was explained by Frank Knight in a spiel that gave full directions of how to obtain the set.

The Director of the Society, Mishel Piastro, described as "Dean of American conductors, famed violin virtuoso and leader of the sessions" seemed, implicitly, to be the conductor of the orchestra and such was assumed until several years later when the popular British conductor and arranger Geoff Love revealed that he had made the arrangements and orchestral recordings in England. Crosby over-dubbed his voice later at Coast Recorders, San Francisco.

Many of the tracks were used again in 1968 and issued on a similar album also called Bing Crosby's Treasury - The Songs I Love. This time there were 36 tracks by Crosby.

== Reception ==
Ralph Harding writing in the fanzine "The Crosby Collector" said: "All of the Bing numbers are exceptionally well done and I would be hard put to pick out a particular favourite and if pressed I suppose "When My Sugar Walks Down the Street" really stood out, probably because it's one of my favourite numbers. You will notice that the great majority of numbers are those already featured by Bing during his recording career. At the moment I don't possess individual master numbers, recording dates and other data but without a doubt Bing is in excellent voice. I appreciate that the album costs a lot of money but even if it means mortgaging the happy home, please don't miss out on this set. It is an excellent buy and I thoroughly recommend it."

== Track listing ==
- all orchestral tracks except where marked "(sung by Bing Crosby)".

Bing Crosby's Treasury - The Songs I Love

LWS 218 - Side One

1. "Where the Blue of the Night (Meets the Gold of the Day)"
2. "Marie"
3. "Stormy Weather" (sung by Bing Crosby) - 3.38
4. "When I Take My Sugar to Tea" (Sammy Fain, Irving Kahal, Pierre Norman)
5. "It's Easy to Remember"
6. "Steppin' Out with My Baby"

LWS 218 - Side Two

1. "These Foolish Things"
2. "Blue Skies"
3. "Red Sails in the Sunset"
4. "Always" (sung by Bing Crosby) - 2.55
5. "You're Mine, You" (Johnny Green, Edward Heyman)
6. "Gimme A Little Kiss (Will Ya, Huh?)" (Maceo Pinkard / Roy Turk / Jack Smith)
7. "Say Si Si"

LWS 219 - Side One

1. "Sophisticated Lady"
2. "That Old Gang of Mine"
3. "Road to Morocco" (Jimmy Van Heusen, Johnny Burke)
4. "Ole Buttermilk Sky" (Hoagy Carmichael / Jack Brooks) (sung by Bing Crosby) - 3.42
5. "Rain on the Roof" (Ann Ronell)
6. "Thank You for a Lovely Evening" (Jimmy McHugh / Dorothy Fields)
7. "There's Danger in Your Eyes, Cherie" (Pete Wendling / Jack Meskill / Harry Richman)

LWS 219 - Side Two

1. "Joobalai" (Ralph Rainger, Leo Robin)
2. "Remember"
3. "I've Heard That Song Before"
4. "Tenderly" (sung by Bing Crosby) - 3.00
5. "Dance with a Dolly" (Terry Shand, Dave Kapp, Jimmy Eaton, Mickey Leader)
6. "Me and My Shadow"
7. "River, Stay 'Way from My Door" (Mort Dixon, Harry M. Woods)

LWS 220 - Side One

1. "Dear Hearts and Gentle People"
2. "(There'll Be Bluebirds Over) The White Cliffs of Dover"
3. "San Fernando Valley" (Gordon Jenkins)
4. "Isn't This a Lovely Day?" (sung by Bing Crosby) - 2.38
5. "After You've Gone"
6. "Drifting and Dreaming"
7. "The Peanut Vendor"

LWS 220 - Side Two

1. "One for My Baby"
2. "Honeymoon" (Joseph E. Howard / Will M. Hough / Frank R. Adams)
3. "The Anniversary Waltz"
4. "In the Chapel in the Moonlight" (sung by Bing Crosby) - 3.27
5. "I Can't Give You Anything but Love, Baby"
6. "How Come You Do Me Like You Do?"
7. "The Ruby and the Pearl" (Jay Livingston, Ray Evans)

LWS 221 - Side One

1. "Yours"
2. "Cecilia"
3. "My Prayer" (sung by Bing Crosby) - 3.03
4. "I'm Confessin' (That I Love You)"
5. "If I Had You"
6. "Just an Echo in the Valley" (Harry M. Woods / Jimmy Campbell / Reg Connelly)
7. "A Sinner Kissed an Angel" (Ray Joseph / Mack David)

LWS 221 - Side Two

1. "Love Makes the World Go 'Round"
2. "Cry"
3. "Say It Isn't So"
4. "Amapola" (sung by Bing Crosby) - 2.57
5. "Another Time, Another Place"
6. "Got the Bench - Got the Park (But I Haven't Got You)" (Al Lewis, Al Sherman)
7. "Friendly Persuasion"

LWS 222 - Side One

1. "Puttin' On the Ritz"
2. "Maybe"
3. "So Rare"
4. "The Breeze and I" (sung by Bing Crosby) - 2.44
5. "I'll Take You Home Again, Kathleen"
6. "Wait 'Till the Sun Shines, Nellie"
7. "I Hear Music"

LWS 222 - Side Two

1. "Ballin' the Jack"
2. "Clementine"
3. "Juanita"
4. "Rock-a-Bye Your Baby with a Dixie Melody" (sung by Bing Crosby) - 3.06
5. "Mister Meadowlark" (Walter Donaldson / Johnny Mercer)
6. "Too Ra Loo Ra Loo Ral"
7. "Where the River Shannon Flows" (James J. Russell)

LWS 223 - Side One

1. "The Birth of the Blues"
2. "Ain't Misbehavin'"
3. "Nobody's Sweetheart"
4. "South of the Border" (sung by Bing Crosby) - 3.36
5. "I Double Dare You" (Terry Shand, Jimmy Eaton)
6. "Sweet and Lovely" (Gus Arnheim, Harry Tobias, Jules Lemare)
7. "A Nightingale Sang in Berkeley Square"

LWS 223 - Side Two

1. "Cheek to Cheek"
2. "Russian Lullaby" (Irving Berlin)
3. "One Morning in May"
4. "I'll Take Romance" (Ben Oakland, Oscar Hammerstein II) (sung by Bing Crosby) - 2.51
5. "Sunbonnet Sue" (Gus Edwards, Will D. Cobb)
6. "Sioux City Sue"
7. "Imagination"

Bing Crosby's All Time Hit Parade (LWS 224)
Side One

1. "Ac-Cent-Tchu-Ate the Positive"
2. "Lonesome and Sorry" (Benny Davis, Con Conrad) (sung by Bing Crosby) - 3.13
3. "I Love My Baby" (Harry Warren, Bud Green)
4. "Mr. Sandman"
5. "When My Sugar Walks Down the Street" (sung by Bing Crosby) - 2.27
6. "The Song Is Ended"

Side Two

1. "Sentimental Gentleman from Georgia" (Frank Perkins, Mitchell Parish)
2. "All Alone" (sung by Bing Crosby) - 2.48
3. "What'll I Do"
4. "Who's Sorry Now?"
5. "Coquette" (sung by Bing Crosby) - 2.41
6. "Riders in the Sky"
