= Amapola (song) =

1920 song composed by José María Lacalle García

Single by Lecuona Cuban Boys
- Released: 1935
- Recorded: October 25, 1935
- Genre: Canción
- Length: 3:20
- Label: Columbia
- Songwriters: Joseph Lacalle (music), Louis Sauvat and Robert Champfleury (French lyrics)

Lecuona Cuban Boys singles chronology
"María Belén Chacón" (1935)	"Amapola" (1935)	"Rumbas cubanas" (1935)

"Amapola (Pretty Little Poppy)"

Single by Jimmy Dorsey and His Orchestra
- Released: February 1941
- Recorded: February 3, 1941
- Genre: Traditional pop
- Length: 4:49
- Label: Decca
- Songwriters: Joseph Lacalle (music), Albert Gamse (English lyrics)

Jimmy Dorsey and His Orchestra singles chronology
"I Hear a Rhapsody" (1941)	"Amapola (Pretty Little Poppy)" (1941)	"Yours" (1941)

"Amapola" is a 1920 song by Spanish American composer José María Lacalle García (later Joseph Lacalle), who also wrote the original lyrics in Spanish. Alternative Spanish lyrics were written by Argentine lyricist Luis Roldán in 1924. French lyrics were written by Louis Sauvat and Robert Champfleury. After the death of Lacalle in 1937, English language lyrics were written by Albert Gamse. In the 1930s, the song became a standard of the rhumba repertoire, later crossing over into pop music charts.

== Recordings ==
"Amapola" was first recorded instrumentally by Cuban Orquesta Francesa de A. Moreno for Columbia in February 1923. Spanish tenor Miguel Fleta made the first vocal recording in 1925. In 1935, the Lecuona Cuban Boys released their rendition of the song as a single, recorded in 1935 in Paris. Japanese singer Noriko Awaya released her version of the song in 1937.

A popular recorded version was made later by the Jimmy Dorsey Orchestra with vocalists Helen O'Connell and Bob Eberly; this was released by Decca Records as catalog number 3629 and arrived on the Billboard charts on March 14, 1941, where it stayed for 14 weeks and reached #1. This version was remembered by American soldiers in World War II and sung with irony as they fought in France and saw the poppies of Flanders Fields. Another English-language version for the American market was recorded by Spike Jones and his City Slickers in the characteristic comic style of his band.

Since its debut "Amapola" has been a favorite recording of opera tenors including Tito Schipa (1926), Nino Martini (1941), Jan Peerce (1950), Alfredo Kraus (1959) and Luigi Alva (1963). Tatsuro Yamashita covered Amapola in his 1986 a cappella album On The Street Corner 2. In 1990 "Amapola" was sung during the first Three Tenors concert in Rome.

Bing Crosby recorded the song three times: first on his album El Señor Bing (1960), then on Bing Crosby's Treasury - The Songs I Love (1965) and finally for his 1975 album Bingo Viejo.

The song was recorded by instrumental surf rockers The Spotnicks, included on their 1962 debut album The Spotnicks in London.

Brazilian singer Roberto Carlos recorded a version with his own Portuguese lyrics in 1964.

In 1985, Mexican artist David Lee Garza recorded the song for the debut album, Totally Yours "Bullet-Proff".

In 2008, Guatemalan artist Gaby Moreno recorded the song for her debut album, Still The Unknown.

Ryuichi Kawamura's cover appears on his 2011 album The Voice.

Natalie Cole included "Amapola" in her 2013 album Natalie Cole en Español.

In 2016, Bradley Walsh recorded the song for his debut album, Chasing Dreams.

== In popular culture ==
Deanna Durbin sang the song in the 1939 film First Love. The song was performed in other films by Alberto Rabagliati (1941) and Sara Montiel (La Bella Lola, 1962). In Gabrielle Roy's The Tin Flute, published in 1945, the character Emmanuel hums "Amapola". An orchestral version of "Amapola" arranged by Ennio Morricone served as a leitmotif in the 1984 gangster film Once Upon a Time in America.

== Sources ==
- Stockdale, Robert L. Jimmy Dorsey: A Study in Contrasts. (Studies in Jazz Series). Lanham, MD: The Scarecrow Press, Inc., 1999.
