= Songs I've Sung on the Perry Como Show =

Studio album by Caterina Valente
- Released: 1964
- Genre: Pop
- Label: London 'FFRR', LL 3355

Professional ratings
Review scores
Source	Rating
AllMusic	2/5 stars
Record Mirror	4/5 stars

Songs I've Sung on the Perry Como Show is an album from Caterina Valente. It is released in the United States and is today known as Valente on TV.

== Track listing ==
=== Side 1 ===
1. Make Someone Happy
2. You're Following Me
3. More Than Likely
4. Couci Couca
5. Corcovado
6. Blue Moon

=== Side 2 ===
1. Falling in Love with Love
2. Stella by Starlight
3. To Be a Performer
4. Yours
5. Dimelo en Septiembre
6. Whispering
