= Ballroom rumba =

Style of ballroom dance

Rhumba
- Stylistic origins: Son cubano, American ballroom music
- Cultural origins: East Coast of the United States, early 1930s
- Typical instruments: Vocals, trumpet, saxophone, trombone, guitar, piano, violin, bass, maracas, congas, bongos, timbales, drums

Subgenres
- Ballroom conga

Regional scenes
- New York City

Rhumba, also known as ballroom rumba, is a genre of ballroom music and dance that appeared in the East Coast of the United States during the 1930s. It combined American big band music with Afro-Cuban rhythms, primarily the son cubano, but also conga and rumba. Although taking its name from the latter, ballroom rumba differs completely from Cuban rumba in both its music and its dance. Hence, some authors prefer the Americanized spelling of the word (rhumba) to distinguish between them.

== Music ==
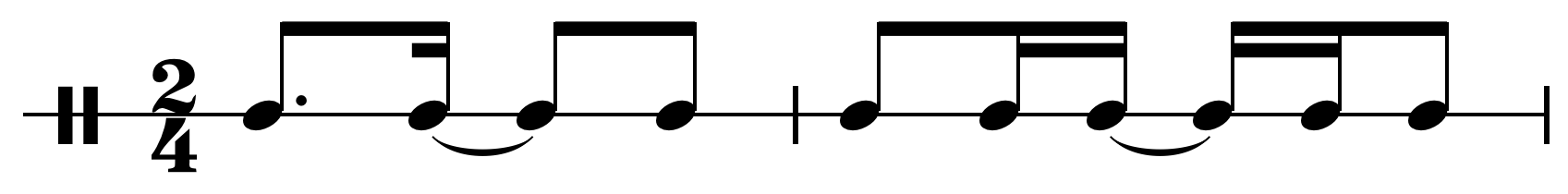
Rhumba rhythm.

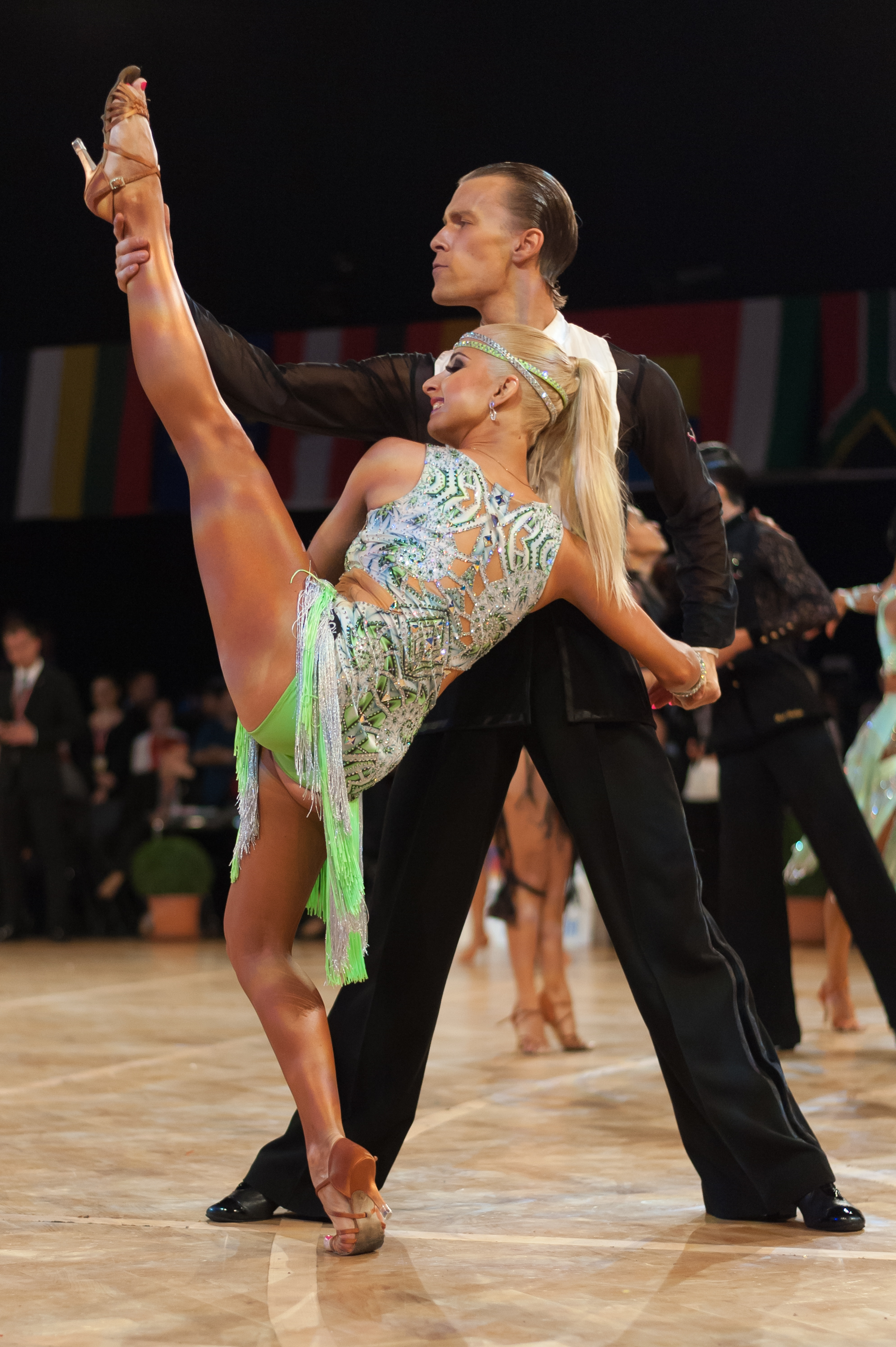
Rhumba

Although the term rhumba began to be used by American record companies to label all kinds of Latin music between 1913 and 1915, the history of rhumba as a specific form of ballroom music can be traced back to May 1930, when Don Azpiazú and his Havana Casino Orchestra recorded their song "El manisero" (The Peanut Vendor) in New York City. This single, released four months later by Victor, became a hit, becoming the first Latin song to sell 1 million copies in the United States. The song, composed by Moisés Simons, is a son-pregón arranged, in this case, for Azpiazú's big band featuring three saxophones, two cornets, banjo, guitar, piano, violin, bass, and trap drums. With vocals by Antonio Machín and a trumpet solo (the first one in the recorded history of Cuban music) by Remberto Lara, the recording, arranged by saxophonist Alfredo Brito, attempted to adapt the Cuban son to the style of ballroom music prevalent at the time in the East Coast.

Soon, Azpiazú's style was followed by other Cuban artists such as Armando Oréfiche and the Lecuona Cuban Boys, who had extensive international tours in the 1930s. Their style has been often described as ballroom conga, since they used to borrow conga rhythms in songs such as "Para Vigo me voy". Among their numerous hits were boleros and canciones such as "Amapola" and "Siboney". This music movement, which also included many American big bands that covered Latin standards, was dubbed the rhumba craze. Notable bandleaders of the rhumba craze include Xavier Cugat, Jimmy Dorsey, Nathaniel Shilkret, Leo Reisman and Enric Madriguera. Rhumba was also incorporated into classical music, as exemplified by symphonic pieces by composers such as George Gershwin, Harl McDonald and Morton Gould.

The kind of rhumba introduced into dance salons in America and Europe in the 1930s was characterized by variable tempo, sometimes nearly twice as fast as the modern ballroom rumba, which was developed as a dance in the 1940s and 1950s, when the original music movement had died down. Nonetheless, the rhumba craze would be the first of three Latin music crazes in the first half of the 20th century, together with the mambo craze and the cha-cha-cha craze.

== Dance ==
American style rhumba box figure

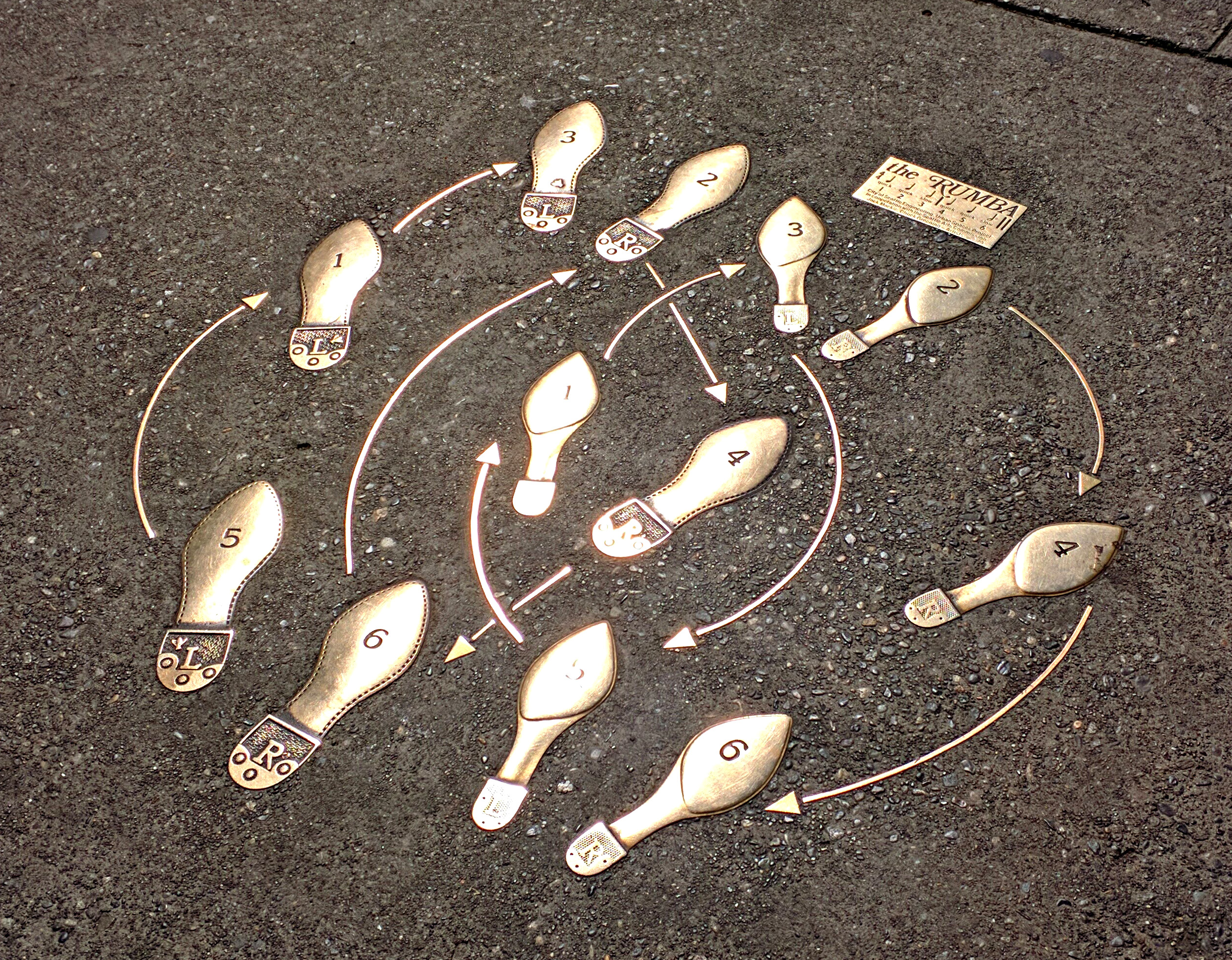
Seattle's Capitol Hill neighborhood has dance steps in the sidewalks on Broadway Ave. This one shows Rumba steps.

Two variations of rhumba with opposing step patterns are danced around the world. American style rumba was imported to America by band directors like Emil Coleman and Don Aspiazú between 1913 and 1935. The film Rumba, released in 1935, brought the style to the attention of the general public. American style rhumba is taught in a box step, known for its slow-quick-quick pattern danced on the 1, 3, and 4 beats of 4-beat music. International style rhumba was developed in Europe by Monsieur Pierre after he compared the established American style with contemporary Cuban dancers. International style is taught in a quick-quick-slow pattern danced on the 2, 3, and 4 beats of 4 beat music, similar in step and motion to the cha-cha-cha. Both styles were canonized in 1955.

=== International style ===
Rhumba is one of the ballroom dances which occurs in social dance and in international competitions. Of the five competitive international Latin dances (pasodoble, samba, cha-cha-cha, jive, and rumba), it is the slowest. This ballroom rumba was derived from a Cuban rhythm and dance called the bolero-son; the international style was derived from studies of dance in Cuba in the pre-revolutionary period.

The modern international style of dancing the rumba derives from studies made by dance teacher Monsieur Pierre (Pierre Zurcher-Margolle), who partnered Doris Lavelle. Pierre, then from London, visited Cuba in 1947, 1951, and 1953 to find out how and what Cubans were dancing at the time.

The international ballroom rumba is a slower dance of about 120 beats per minute which corresponds, both in music and in dance, to what the Cubans of an older generation called the bolero-son. It is easy to see why, for ease of reference and for marketing, rhumba is a better name, however inaccurate; it is the same kind of reason that led later on to the use of salsa as an overall term for popular music of Cuban origin.

All social dances in Cuba involve a hip-sway over the standing leg and, though this is scarcely noticeable in fast salsa, it is more pronounced in the slow ballroom rumba. In general, steps are kept compact and the dance is danced generally without any rise and fall. This style is authentic, as is the use of free arms in various figures. The basic figures derive from dance moves observed in Havana in the pre-revolutionary period, and have developed their own life since then. Competition figures are often complex, and this is where competition dance separates from social dance. Details can be obtained from the syllabuses of dance teaching organizations and from standard texts.

=== American style ===
There is also a variant, commonly danced in the United States, with box-like basic figures.

== See also ==
- Son cubano
- Cuban rumba
- Conga (music)
- Mambo (music) / Mambo (dance)
- Cha-cha-cha (music) / Cha-cha-cha (dance)
