= Say "Si Si" =

1935 song by Ernesto Lecuona

"Para Vigo me voy"

Single by Xavier Cugat & His Orchestra
- B-side: "A Street in Old Seville"
- Released: 1936
- Recorded: December 13, 1935
- Genre: Ballroom conga
- Label: Victor
- Songwriter: Ernesto Lecuona

Xavier Cugat & His Orchestra singles chronology
"Cosi cosa" (1935)	"Para Vigo me voy" (1936)	"The Missouri Waltz" (1936)

"Para Vigo me voy"

Single by Lecuona Cuban Boys
- B-side: "Patica y Mondonguito"
- Released: 1937
- Recorded: May 31, 1937
- Genre: Ballroom conga
- Label: Columbia Records
- Songwriter: Ernesto Lecuona

Lecuona Cuban Boys singles chronology
"La paloma - Cielito lindo" (1937)	"Para Vigo me voy" (1937)	"Trakatrá" (1937)

"Para Vigo me voy", known in English as "Say Si Si", is a popular song written in 1935 by Cuban composer Ernesto Lecuona with lyrics by Francia Luban (original Spanish version) and Al Stillman (translated English version). Early bands to record the song include Xavier Cugat's orchestra (1935) and the Lecuona Cuban Boys (1937). The song was copyrighted in the United States in 1940. It became a hit in the U.S. when it was recorded by The Andrews Sisters and Glenn Miller in 1940 and The Mills Brothers in 1953.

== Style ==
Releases including "Para Vigo me voy" often label the song as a conga, or occasionally a rumba. Thus, it is considered an early example of a "salon conga" or "ballroom conga", in the same vein as the famous "ballroom rumbas" such as "The Peanut Vendor" ("El manisero"). According to musicologist Alberto Pérez Perazzo, "Para Vigo me voy" is one of the first popular songs with a true conga rhythm.

== Recordings ==
One of the earliest recordings of "Para Vigo me voy" was made by Xavier Cugat and his orchestra featuring vocalist Desi Arnaz in December 1935 for Victor. Cugat re-recorded the song in 1945. In 1937, the Lecuona Cuban Boys, the ballroom rhumba band established by Ernesto Lecuona himself, recorded the song for Columbia with a 1936 recording of "Patica y Mondonguito" as the B-side.

Popular American artists who have recorded the song include The Andrews Sisters, Glenn Miller and His Orchestra, and The Mills Brothers. Besides, the song appeared in various films including It Comes Up Love (sung by Gloria Jean and The Guadalajara Trio, accompanied by Leon Belasco and his orchestra).

The Andrews Sisters' version (on Decca Records label 3013), recorded February 7, 1940 and released in February 1940) was the most popular version. It entered the US Billboard charts on March 30, 1940, reaching a peak position of #4. This version was also re-released under Decca label 25098 in 1948 after it was included in the movie When My Baby Smiles at Me

The Glenn Miller version, with vocals by Marion Hutton (on Bluebird Records label 10622), was recorded on January 26, 1940 and also released in 1940. It reached #15 on the Billboard charts.

The Mills Brothers' recording (on Decca Records, label 28670) was recorded on February 24, 1953. It was released in May 1953 and reached #12 on the Billboard charts. In 1985, the Art of Noise sampled the beginning of this recording for "Legs".

=== Other versions ===
According to the Diaz Ayala Cuban and Latin American Popular Music Collection at the Florida International University Libraries, the following artists have recorded "Para Vigo me voy":

Johnny Rodríguez (1936),
Lorenzo Pego y su Orquesta (1936),
Manuel Escalona (1936),
Orquesta Obregón (1936),
Leo Reisman (1937),
Francisco Lomuto (1937),
Marimba Panamericana (1937),
Nilo Menéndez (1938),
Henry King (1938),
Diosa Costello (1940),
Marcos Rosales (1940),
Noro Morales (1945),
Frank Damirón (1948),
Miguelito Valdés (1950),
Tony-Armand (1952),
Pearl Bailey (1954),
Billo's Caracas Boys (1954),
Varela Varelita y su Orquesta de Jazz (1954),
Humberto Suárez (1955),
Julio Gutiérrez & Cuarteto Faxas (1956),
Oquesta Havana Casino (1956),
Félix Guerrero (1956),
Dan Davis (1956),
Lawrence Welk (1957),
Bing Crosby & Rosemary Clooney with Billy May's orchestra for the album Fancy Meeting You Here (1958),
Carlos Barbería y su Orquesta Kubavana (1959),
Toni Arden (1959),
Orquesta D'Artega (1960),
Chapuseaux y Damirón, Chucho Rodríguez, Antonio Matas, Chamaco García, Ñico Membiela, Huberal Herrera, René Cóspito, Everardo Ordaz, Hugo Avendaño, Juan Bruno Tarraza (1964),
Bing Crosby for his album Bing Crosby's Treasury - The Songs I Love (1968 version) (1968)
César Morales (1968),
Mariano Mercerón (1975),
Alfredo Sadel (1978),
Los Guaracheros de Oriente (1980),
Carlos Nuñez Muñoz & La Vieja Trova Santiaguera (1996),
Alfredo Kraus (1996),
Compay Segundo (1998),
Bebo Valdés (2000), as the last track of El Arte del Sabor (in a medley with "Adiós Panamá", also by Lecuona).
