= Sweden Bass Orchestra =

Studio album by Sweden Bass Orchestra featuring Niels-Henning Ørsted Pedersen
- Released: 1995
- Genre: Jazz
- Label: Four Leaf Clover (label)

Sweden Bass Orchestra is an album by Danish jazz bassist Niels-Henning Ørsted Pedersen, recorded in 1995 for Four Leaf Clover (FLC 141).

== Track listing ==
1. "Donna Lee"—5:06
2. "Softly, As in a Morning Sunrise"—9:49
3. "Misty"—5:03
4. "Here's That Rainy Day"—7:08
5. "So What"—6:17
6. "A Blue Banana"—4:49
7. "I Hear a Rhapsody"—4:05
8. "Chillin' Elephants"—6:09
9. "Somewhere over the Rainbow"—2:30

== Personnel ==
- Niels-Henning Ørsted Pedersen—double bass
- Jonas Reingold—piccolo bass (1st bass)
- Patrik Albin—double bass (2nd bass)
- Karl Magnusson—double bass (3rd bass)
- Peter Anderhagen—fretless bass (4th bass)
- Mattias Hjort—double bass (5th bass)
- Ola Bothzén—drums

All arrangements by Jonas Reingold except "Somewhere over the Rainbow," arranged by Mattias Hjort.
