= Chantez, Chantez =

Song

"Chantez, Chantez" is a popular song written by Irving Fields (music) and Albert Gamse (lyrics), which in 1957 was a Top 30 hit single for Dinah Shore.

== Background and chart performance ==
Disappointed with her recent chartings, Shore had held "open houses" for composers at her residence to find strong material for her next single and through this process discovered "Chantez, Chantez" and also the song which served as its B-side: the Red Skipwine composition "Honky Tonk Heart". Shore premiered "Chantez, Chantez" on the 11 January 1957 broadcast of the Dinah Shore Chevy Show. Despite heavy promotion by Shore, "Chantez, Chantez" only just made the Top 30 of the Billboard Hot 100 at #27.

== Cover versions ==
- Alma Cogan and Marion Ryan both covered "Chantez, Chantez" for the UK, market with neither version charting.

== Popular culture ==
- In the 1963 film Take Her, She's Mine, Sandra Dee sings "Chantez, Chantez" in character as an American exchange student in Paris.
