= The Breeze and I =

English language song version of instrumental Andaluza

Song by Jimmy Dorsey and His Orchestra
- B-side: Little curly hair in a high chair
- Released: May 1940
- Recorded: April 18, 1940
- Length: 3:02
- Label: Decca 3150
- Composer: Ernesto Lecuona
- Lyricists: Emilio de Torre (Spanish); Al Stillman (English)

Jimmy Dorsey and His Orchestra singles chronology
"The Breeze and I" (1940)	"I Hear a Rhapsody" (1940)

"The Breeze and I" is a popular song.

The original music (instrumental only) entitled Andalucía, was written by the Cuban composer Ernesto Lecuona as part of his Suite Andalucía in 1928. Emilio de Torre added Spanish lyrics, and English lyrics were added in 1940 by Al Stillman.

The best-known version of the song is that by Jimmy Dorsey in 1940. The Jimmy Dorsey recording, with a vocal by Bob Eberly, was released by Decca Records as catalogue number 3150. The record first reached the Billboard magazine charts on July 20, 1940, and lasted nine weeks on the chart, peaking at #2.

== Other notable recordings ==
- Xavier Cugat – a No. 13 hit in 1940 (vocal by Dinah Shore).
- Vic Damone – reached No. 21 in the Billboard charts in 1954.
- Caterina Valente (1955) – The recording for Polydor was released in England as catalogue number BM 6002 and reached a peak position of #5 (Guinness British hit singles & albums 19). The record first reached the Billboard magazine charts on March 30, 1955 and lasted 14 weeks on the chart, peaking at #13. By a report from 1978, Valente's The Breeze and I has sold more than 1,000,000 times, making it her best-selling record.
- The Fentones recorded a guitar-based instrumental version of the song in 1962, using the title "The Breeze and I" rather than "Andalucía" even though there were no lyrics. It hit #48 on the UK charts.
- The Shadows also cut an instrumental version, which was issued as a double A-side with the #1 UK hit "Foot Tapper" in 1963. However, UK chart compilers elected not to recognize the record label's double A-side designation, and consequently The Shadows' version of "The Breeze And I" did not chart.
- Bing Crosby included the song in his albums Bing Crosby's Treasury - The Songs I Love (1965) and Bingo Viejo (1977). It was also included in a medley with "Malaguena" in his 1961 album El Señor Bing.

== Film appearance ==
- Cuban Pete (1946)
