= Gonzalo Roig =

Cuban musician, conductor and composer (1890–1970)

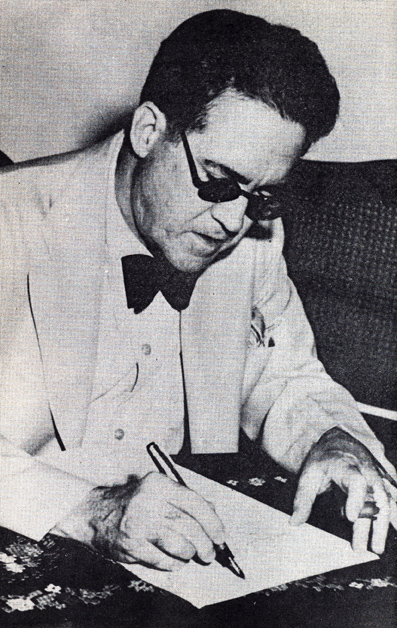
Gonzalo Roig

Gonzalo Roig Lobo (Havana, 20 July 1890 – Havana, 13 June 1970) was a Cuban composer, pianist, violinist and musical director. He was a pioneer of the symphonic movement in Cuba. His most popular works are the zarzuela Cecilia Valdés and the song "Quiéreme mucho" (known in English as "Yours").

== Life and career ==
In 1902, he began to study piano, music theory and solfège and then later graduated in music studies at the Havana Conservatory. In 1907, he played part, as a pianist, in an ensemble (trio), and thus started his very active career in music, composed his first musical piece Voice of misfortune for piano and solo voice. Two years later, he began playing violin at the Martí Theater in Havana. In 1917 he traveled to Mexico, and worked there briefly, returning to Cuba the same year. In 1922, he was co-founder of the Symphony Orchestra in Havana, of which he became music director.

In 1927, he was appointed director of the Municipal Music Band of Havana. During his tenure as director (he held the position until his death) he made countless contributions to the Cuban music. In 1929 he founded the Orquesta de Ignacio Cervantes, which, a year later, was invited by the Pan American Union to lead a series of concerts in The United States of America. In 1931, while participating in the creation of the National Theatre, he composed and premiered (next year) his zarzuela, Cecilia Valdés, a typical example of the Cuban lyric theatre.

In 1938, he founded the National Opera in Havana, which he directed for a few years. He traveled frequently and gave performances in many parts of the world. He founded the Society of Cuban Authors, the National Federation of Authors of Cuba, the National Union of Authors of Cuba and the National Society of Authors of Cuba.
