= Star Dust (Bing Crosby album) =

Star Dust: A Group of Sentimental Songs Sung by Bing Crosby
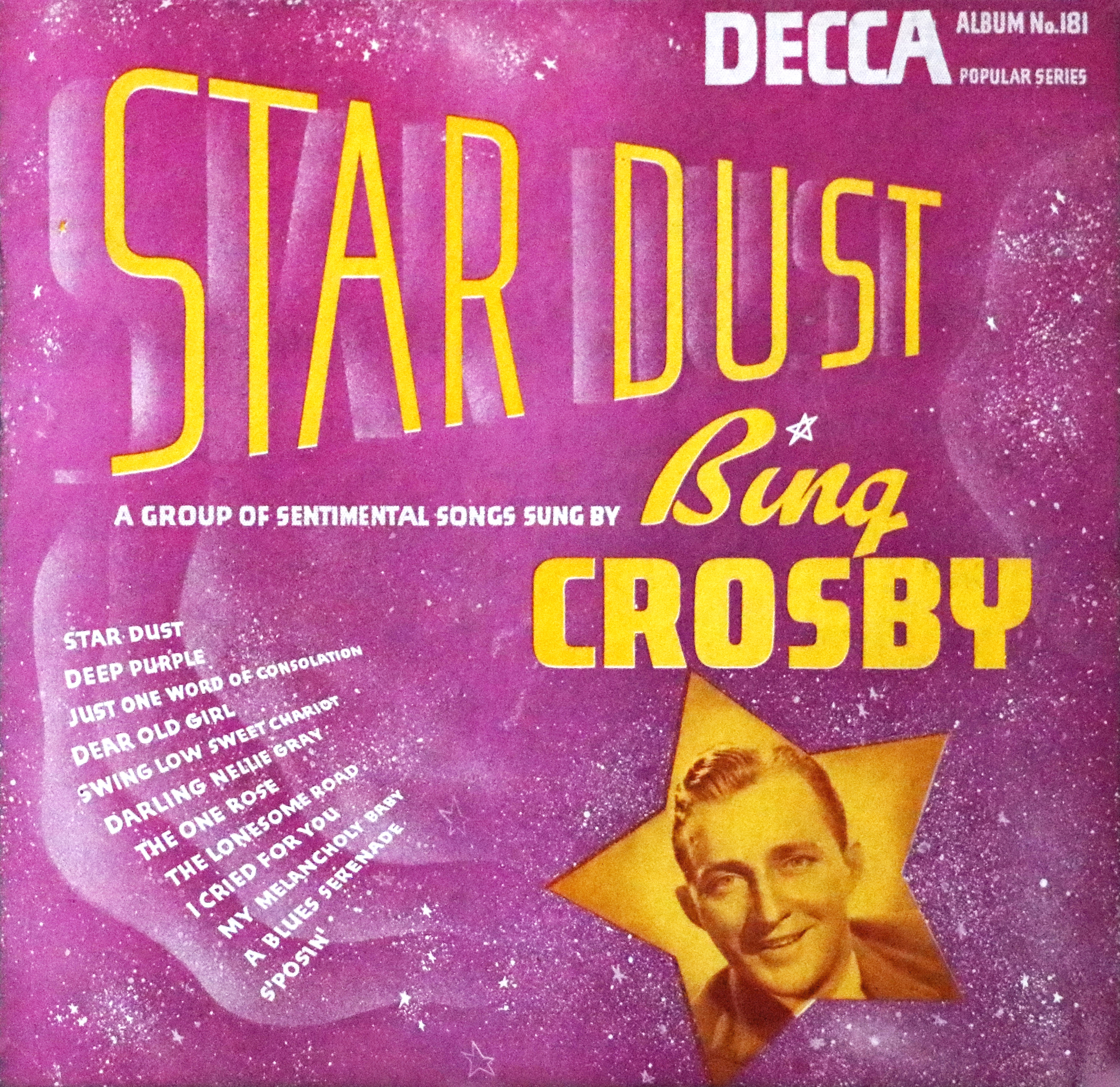

Compilation album by Bing Crosby
- Released: 1940 (original 78 rpm album); 1950 (re-release 78 rpm album); 1949 (original LP album); 1949 (original 45 rpm album); 1957 (original EP album)
- Recorded: 1936, 1937, 1938, 1939
- Genre: Popular, sentimental
- Length: 36:32 (original 78 rpm album); 18:25 (re-release 78 rpm album)
- Label: Decca

Bing Crosby chronology
Christmas Music (1940)	Star Dust: A Group of Sentimental Songs Sung by Bing Crosby (1940)	Hawaii Calls (1941)

Alternate cover
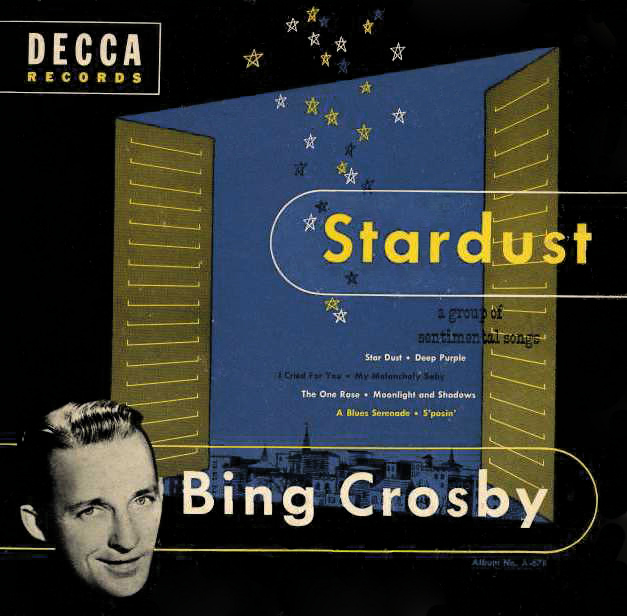
- The 1950 reissue 78 rpm cover

Star Dust is an album of phonograph records by Bing Crosby released in 1940 featuring songs that are sung sentimentally, being based upon the 1927 popular song "Stardust". This album featured his 1939 Decca recording of the song, not the 1931 recording he made for Brunswick.

== Original track listing ==
These previously issued songs were featured on a 6-disc, 78 rpm album set, Decca Album No. 181.

Side / Title	Writer(s)	Recording date	Performed with	Time
Disc 1 (2374):
A. "Stardust"	Mitchell Parish, Hoagy Carmichael	March 22, 1939	Matty Malneck and His Orchestra	3:01
B. "Deep Purple"	Mitchell Parish, Peter DeRose	March 22, 1939	Matty Malneck and His Orchestra	3:12
Disc 2 (1044):
A. "Just One Word of Consolation"	Frank B. Williams, Tom Lemonier	August 12, 1936	Ivan Ditmars and the Three Cheers	3:14
B. "Dear Old Girl"	Theodore F. Morse, Richard Henry Buck	August 12, 1936	Ivan Ditmars and the Three Cheers	3:08
Disc 3 (3540):
A. "Swing Low, Sweet Chariot"	Wallace Willis	April 25, 1938	John Scott Trotter and His Orchestra	2:57
B. "Darling Nellie Gray"	Benjamin Hanby	April 25, 1938	The Paul Taylor Choristers	3:01
Disc 4 (3541):
A. "The One Rose"	Del Lyon, Lani McIntyre	March 5, 1937	Victor Young and His Orchestra	3:09
B. "The Lonesome Road"	Gene Austin, Nathaniel Shilkret	December 12, 1938	John Scott Trotter and His Orchestra	2.58
Disc 5 (3542):
A. "I Cried for You"	Arthur Freed, Abe Lyman, Gus Arnheim	December 12, 1938	John Scott Trotter and His Orchestra	3:06
B. "My Melancholy Baby"	George A. Norton, Ernie Burnett	December 12, 1938	John Scott Trotter and His Orchestra	2:58
Disc 6 (3543):
A. "A Blues Serenade"	Frank Signorelli, Mitchell Parish	July 8, 1938	Matty Malneck and His Orchestra	2:50
B. "S'posin'"	Paul Denniker, Andy Razaf	April 3, 1939	The Music Maids and John Scott Trotter and His Orchestra	2:58

== Re-issue track listing ==
In 1950, a set of the same name but slightly different selections was released with a darker cover. These reissued songs were featured on a 4-disc, 78 rpm album set, Decca Album No. A-678.

Disc 1 (25365): "Star Dust" / "Deep Purple"
Disc 2 (25366): "I Cried for You" / "My Melancholy Baby"
Disc 3 (25367): "The One Rose" / "Moonlight and Shadows"
Disc 4 (25368): "A Blues Serenade" / "S'posin'"

The one new song to the collection was "Moonlight and Shadows", written by Leo Robin and Frederick Hollander and recorded by Bing with Victor Young and his Orchestra on March 5, 1937 (running time: 3:15).

== LP track listing ==
The 1950 10-inch LP album issue Decca DL 5126 consisted entirely of Decca A-678 on a 10-inch LP. All were reissues of earlier recordings:

Side 1

1. "Star Dust"
2. "Deep Purple"
3. "I Cried for You"
4. "My Melancholy Baby"

Side 2

5. "The One Rose"
6. "Moonlight and Shadows"
7. "A Blues Serenade"
8. "S'posin'"

== Other releases ==
In 1949, the same selections as Decca DL 5126 were released on a set of three 45s on Decca 9-25.

In 1957, the same set was released on two 45 rpm EP records on a set titled Decca ED 581.
