= Mount Moriah Cemetery (Fairview, New Jersey) =

Jewish cemetery in New Jersey

Coordinates: 40.8210°N 74.0030°W

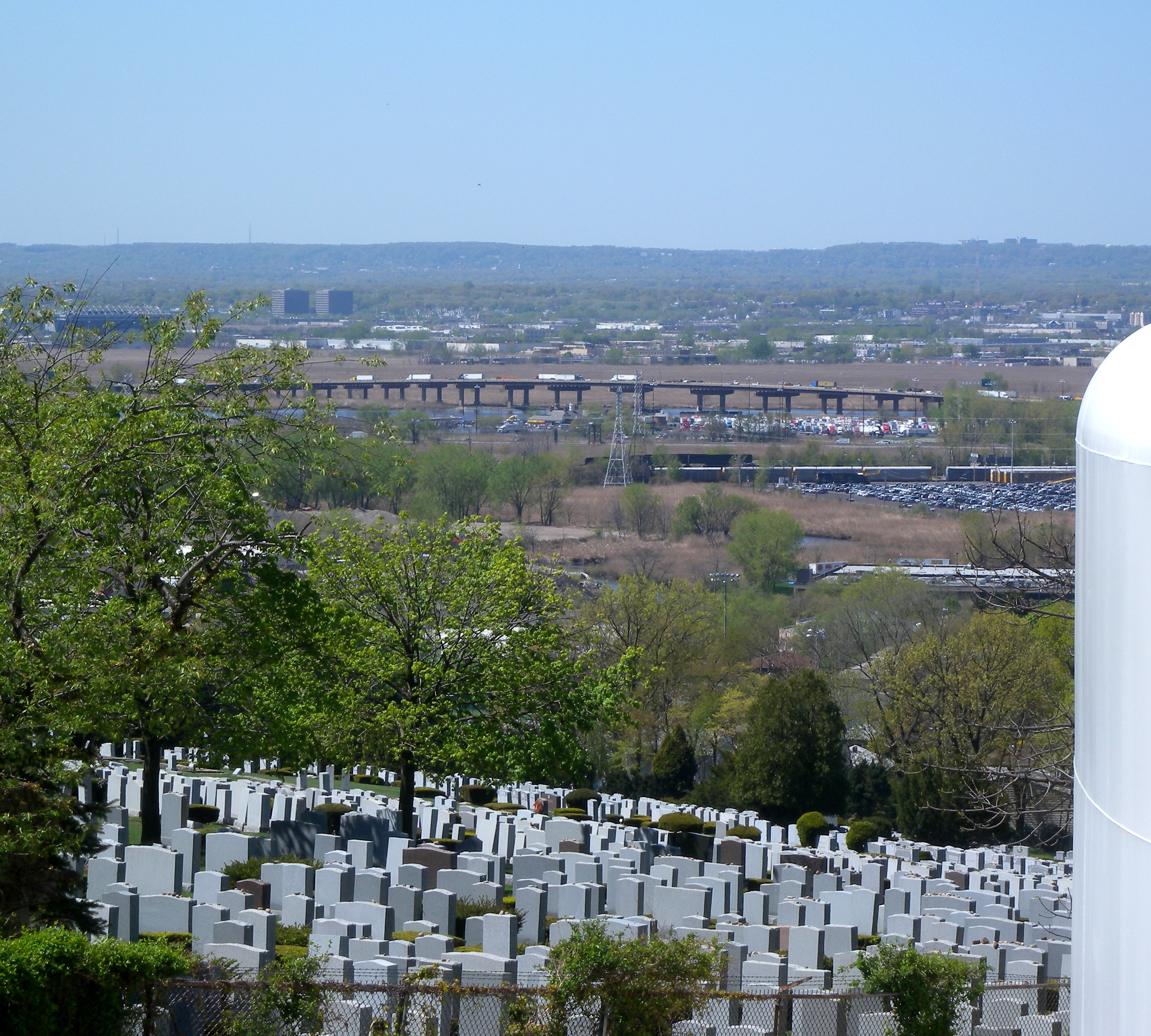
- Interactive map of Mount Moriah Cemetery

Details
- Established: 1910
- Location: 685 Farivew Avenue; Fairview, Bergen County, New Jersey
- Country: United States
- Type: Jewish
- No. of graves: 28,000+
- Website: mountmoriahcemeterynj.org
- Find a Grave: Mount Moriah Cemetery

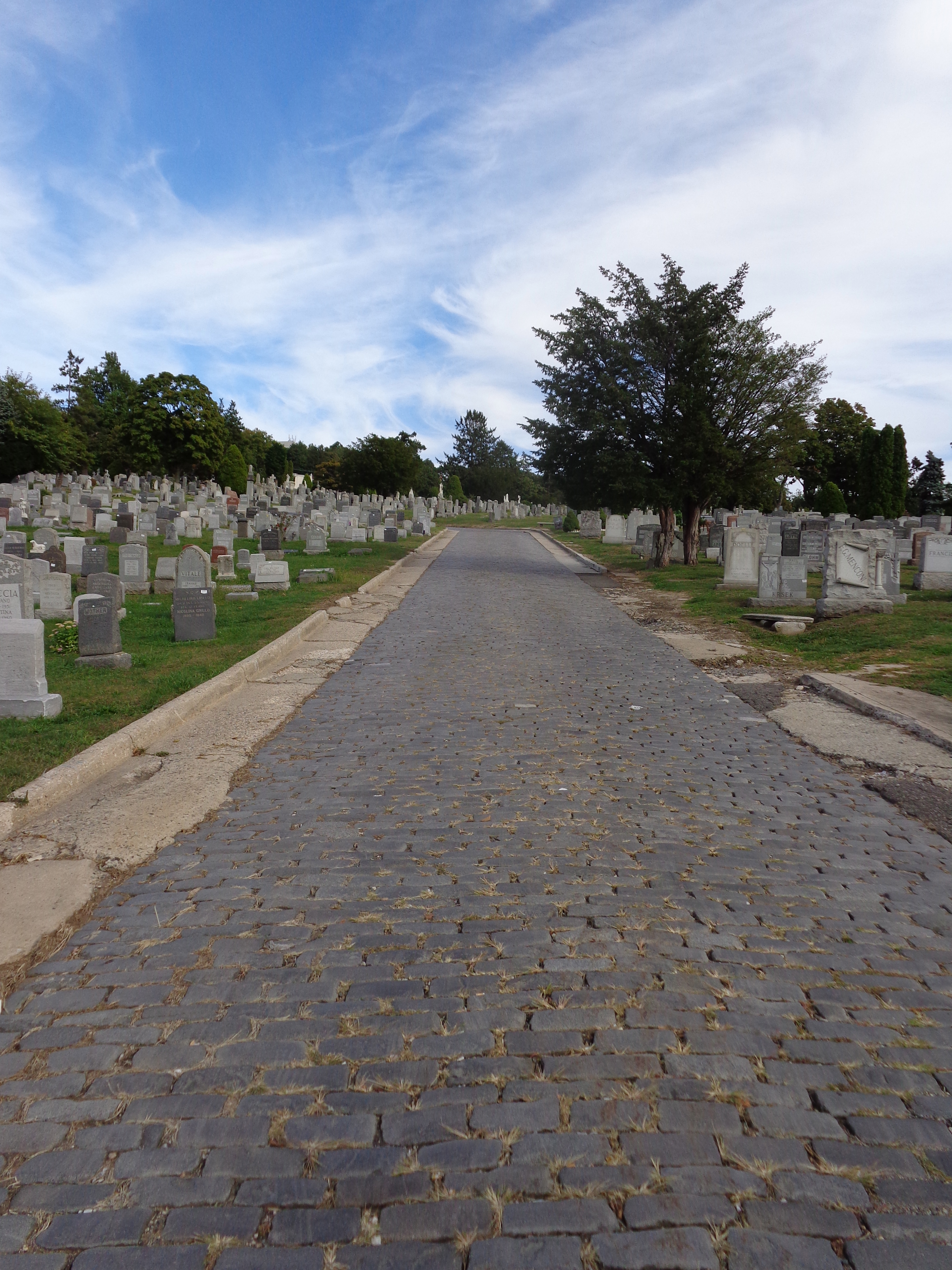
Entrance on Broad Avenue looking to the western slope of the Hudson Palisades

Mount Moriah Cemetery is a burial ground in Fairview, Bergen County, New Jersey, in the United States, located on the western slopes of the Hudson Palisades, nearby the Fairview Cemetery.

Moriah (Hebrew: מוֹרִיָּה, Modern: Moriyya, Tiberian: Môriyyā) (Arabic: مروة Marwah) is the name given to a mountain by the Book of Genesis, in which context it is the location of the sacrifice of Isaac.

== Notable interments ==
- Pesach Ackerman (1928–2013), Rabbi of Meseritz Synagogue
- Camilla Frydan (1887–1949), Austrian-born pianist, singer, composer and songwriter
- Robert P. Grover (1916–1942), first Jewish serviceman from Jersey City to die in WWII
- Russell Harding (d. 2008), New York City administrator
- Arthur George Klein (1904–1968), United States Representative (NY)
- Ira Rubin (1930–2013), American professional contract bridge player
- Garry Winogrand (1928–1984), street photographer
- Rosalyn Sussman Yalow (1921-2011), American medical physicist, and co-winner of the 1977 Nobel Prize in Physiology or Medicine

== See also ==
- List of New Jersey cemeteries
- List of cemeteries in Hudson County, New Jersey
