= Yours (Quiéreme Mucho) =

1911 composition by Gonzalo Roig

"Quiéreme Mucho"

Song by Tito Schipa
- Language: Spanish
- English title: Love Me Deeply
- Written: 1911
- Published: 1921
- Released: 1923
- Recorded: March 12, 1923
- Genre: Criolla-bolero
- Label: Victrola 929
- Composer: Gonzalo Roig
- Lyricists: Ramón Gollury, Agustín Rodríguez

"Yours (Quiéreme Mucho)"

Song by Jimmy Dorsey and His Orchestra
- Language: English
- Published: 1931
- Released: March 1941
- Recorded: February 3, 1941
- Genre: Foxtrot
- Label: Decca 3657
- Composer: Gonzalo Roig
- Lyricists: Albert Gamse, Jack Sherr

Jimmy Dorsey and His Orchestra singles chronology
"Amapola (Pretty Little Poppy)" (1941)	"Yours (Quiéreme Mucho)" (1941)	"Maria Elena / Green Eyes" (1941)

"Quiéreme mucho" is a criolla-bolero composed in 1911 by Gonzalo Roig with lyrics by Ramón Gollury and Agustín Rodríguez. The song was inspired by Roig's wife, Blanca Becerra, and premiered in Havana in 1911 without much success. In 1917, it was included in the sainete El servicio militar obligatorio and performed by Becerra and Rafael Llorens to critical acclaim. Roig published and sold the rights to the song in 1921, and the first recording was made in the United States by singer Tito Schipa in 1923. The English version, "Yours", was published in 1931 in the United States. It featured lyrics in English written by Albert Gamse and Jack Sherr. Both versions have been extensively recorded and arranged by different musicians, becoming Latin music standards.

== Composition ==
"Quiéreme mucho" was composed by Gonzalo Roig at 21 years of age in 1911, before he had finished his music studies. He wrote the melody and played it on his piano, without making any further arrangements. Roig had been composing songs for a few years, since 1907, when he wrote "La voz del infortunio" at age 17. At the time, Roig had begun to work as a pianist at the Monte Carlo cinema (Prado 117) in Havana. For "Quiéreme mucho", he combined the structure of a criolla (the first part) with that of a bolero (the second part), this possibly being the first time both genres had been combined in one song. The song has a romantic style, which suggests an influence from the Italian lyric song.

While the music of the song was composed by Roig, the lyrics were originally written by him and his partner Blanca Becerra. Roig and Becerra had just got married in 1911 and decided to paraphrase verses by a now obscure poet and journalist, Ramón Rivera Gollury. Roig wrote the first three verses: "Quiéreme siempre, negra querida. No dudes nunca de mi querer. Él es muy grande, él es inmenso". And Becerra wrote the fourth: "Siempre, mi negro, yo te querré". However, this version was not published, since Roig decided instead to directly quote Gollury's poem, which became the widely known first stanza of the song: "Quiéreme mucho, dulce amor mío, que siempre amante te adoraré...". The second stanza ("Cuando se quiere de veras, como te quiero yo a ti...") was written by librettist Agustín Rodríguez (1885–1957), who would write the lyrics to many other songs by Roig. Gollury did not know about the song until he saw it performed years later at the Teatro Martí.

== Early performances ==
The song was premiered by tenor Mariano Menéndez at the Nicolás Ruiz Espadero Hall in the Hubert de Blanck Conservatory of Havana under the title "Serenata cubana" (Cuban Serenade) in 1911. At first, the song did not have any success. Years later, Roig decided to include the song in the sainete El servicio militar obligatorio about World War I, which premiered at the Teatro Martí in 1917. In the play, Becerra and Rafael Llorens performed the song as a duet, which was very well received by the audience and spurred countless covers and performances, including many recordings made in the United States in the 1920s.

In 1921, Roig published the song through the Viuda de Carrera shop with its definitive title, "Quiéreme mucho" (Love Me a Lot) and crediting Gollury under his pen name Roger de Lauria. However, he never received royalties for the song, since he sold the rights to Viuda de Carrera for 5 Cuban pesos.

== Recordings ==
=== Early versions ===
Italian tenor Tito Schipa, backed by an orchestra directed by Rosario Bourdon, made the first recording of the song on March 12, 1923, for the Victor Talking Machine Company. This recording was subtitled "Serenata criolla" (Creole serenade) and translated as "Love Me Deeply". Of the four takes recorded by Schipa in Camden, New Jersey, only the fourth (master) take survives. He recorded two more takes in 1926, the second of which was released as a 10" single and later re-issued on 45 rpm format and on LP, unlike the first single, which was only released on 10" shellac. Other vocalists to record the original song in the 1920s include Elena Ehlers (1923, Columbia Records), José Moriche (1924, OKeh Records) and Mariano Meléndez (1925, Pathé), who had first performed it in 1911. Meléndez's version featured Jaime Prats on piano.

=== Hit versions ===
The success of the Spanish version of the song prompted its translation in the United States, where lyricists Albert Gamse and Jack Sherr published "Yours". This song became popular due to the recordings by the Jimmy Dorsey Orchestra, Vera Lynn, and Dick Contino. A German version was published under the title "Du bist mein erster Gedanke" (You Are My First Thought) and first recorded by Mieke Telkamp (1956, Philips), becoming her first hit in the country. The German version has also been recorded by Cliff Richard with The Shadows, and Julio Iglesias. The latter also recorded the song in Spanish, English, French ("Où est passée ma bohême?"; Where Is My Bohemian?), Portuguese ("Inesquecivel boemia") and Italian ("Quando si ama davvero").

The recording by Jimmy Dorsey featured vocals by Bob Eberly and Helen O'Connell and was released by Decca Records as catalog number 3657. It first reached the Billboard Best Seller chart on May 23, 1941, and lasted 13 weeks on the chart, peaking at #2. The recording by Vera Lynn was released by London Records as catalog number 1261. It first reached the Billboard Best Seller chart on October 17, 1952, and lasted 8 weeks on the chart, peaking at #8. The recording by Dick Contino, an instrumental, was released by Mercury Records as catalog number 70455. It reached #27 on its only week on the Billboard Best Seller chart on November 24, 1954. The recording by Cliff Richard (with The Shadows) in German, went to #15 in Germany in 1966. The French recording by Julio Iglesias went to number 1 in France in 1979 achieving double platinum sales. A Spanish-English version by Iglesias was a hit in the United Kingdom in 1982.

=== Anni-Frid Lyngstad version ===
"Din"

Single by Anni-Frid Lyngstad

from the album På egen hand
- Language: Swedish
- English title: Yours
- B-side: "Du är så underbart rar"
- Released: 15 December 1967
- Recorded: 10 October 1967
- Studio: EMI Studios, Stockholm, Sweden
- Length: 2:39
- Label: His Master's Voice
- Lyricists: Conzalo Roig, Jerico

Anni-Frid Lyngstad singles chronology
"En Ledig Dag" (1967)	"Din" (1967)	"Simsalabim" (1968)

Anni-Frid Lyngstad and Marcus Österdahls Orchestra (in Swedish) (15 December 1967) - The Swedish-language version, "Din" was the second single released by Lyngstad for EMI. The single was backed by Du Är Så Underbart Rar. The single did not chart in the Svenkstoppen but appeared on the Toppentipset charts, peaking at 12th place on 11 February 1968. The following week, the B-side instead charted in 13th place and 15th place on 17th March 1968.

== Charts ==
Chart (1968)	Peak position
Sweden (Toppentipset)	12

=== Other versions ===
- Ray Anthony and his orchestra
- Lucie Arnaz
- Chet Atkins
- Gene Autry
- Baja Marimba Band
- The Beau Marks
- Vikki Carr
- José Carreras
- Ray Charles
- Bing Crosby recorded the song in 1956 for use on his radio show and it was subsequently included in the box set The Bing Crosby CBS Radio Recordings (1954-56) issued by Mosaic Records (catalog MD7-245) in 2009.
- Xavier Cugat (vocal: Dinah Shore) (1939)
- Dick Dale
- The Del-Vikings (1956)
- Plácido Domingo, who also named one of his albums after the Spanish-language version of the song, Quiéreme Mucho (2002)
- The Duprees
- Percy Faith
- Freddy Fender
- Ibrahim Ferrer (2007)
- The Flamingos (1959)
- Connie Francis (1960)
- John Gary
- Benny Goodman and his orchestra (vocal: Helen Forrest) (1941)
- Eydie Gormé
- Eddy Howard
- Engelbert Humperdinck (1985)
- Julio Iglesias (1979)
- Joni James (1963)
- Andre Kostelanetz and his orchestra
- Alfredo Kraus
- Charlie Kunz
- Frankie Laine with Michel LeGrand (1958)
- Julie London (1963)
- Frankie Lymon & The Teenagers (1958)
- Tony Martin
- Vaughn Monroe and his orchestra (vocal: Marilyn Duke) (1941)
- Nana Mouskouri
- Jim Reeves
- Marty Robbins (1962)
- Dickie Rock
- Linda Ronstadt (1992)
- Edmundo Ros
- The Salsoul Orchestra (1978)
- George Shearing (Latin Escapade 1956)
- The Three Degrees
- Jerry Vale (1963)
- Caterina Valente
- Billy Vaughn and his orchestra
- Hugo Winterhalter and his orchestra
- Finbar Wright
