= C'est Magnifique =

1953 musical number from Can-Can by Cole Porter

"C'est magnifique" ("It's Magnificent") is a 1953 popular song written by Cole Porter for his 1953 musical Can-Can, where it was introduced by Lilo and Peter Cookson. The song became a standard. The only version to chart was by Gordon MacRae which reached No. 29 for one week.

In the 1960 film of Can-Can, the song was performed by Frank Sinatra and Shirley Maclaine.

== Other notable versions ==
- Bing Crosby – included in the album El Señor Bing (1960)
- Frank Sinatra – included in Can-Can Original Soundtrack album (1960)
- Kay Starr – for her album Movin' on Broadway (1960)
- Peggy Lee – included in her album Latin ala Lee! (1960)
- Dean Martin – for his album French Style (1962)
- Ella Fitzgerald – Ella Loves Cole (1972)
