= An Album of Christmas Music =

Decca Presents An Album of Christmas Music
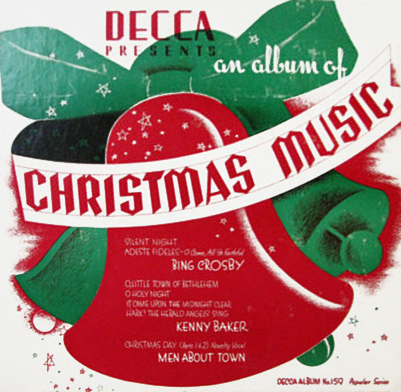

Compilation album by Bing Crosby, Kenny Baker, Men About Town, Eddie Dunstedter
- Released: Original 78 album: 1940
- Recorded: 1934, 1935, 1938
- Genre: Christmas
- Label: Decca Records

Bing Crosby chronology
Favorite Hawaiian Songs (1940)	Decca Presents; An Album of Christmas Music (1940)	Star Dust (1940)

An Album of Christmas Music is a compilation album of phonograph records put together for the Christmas season by Decca Records in late 1940. The album features the most popular artists recording for Decca such as: Bing Crosby, Kenny Baker, Men About Town and Eddie Dunstedter. It features Bing Crosby's first commercial release of "Silent Night", the 1942 version of which went on to sell 30 million copies.

== Track listing ==
The 1940 album issue Decca Album No. 159 consisted of these previously issued 78 rpm records:

Disc 1: (304)

1. "Christmas Day (Part One)", recorded in November 1934 by Men About Town
2. "Christmas Day (Part Two)", recorded in November 1934 by Men About Town

Disc 2: (621)

3. "Silent Night", recorded November 13, 1935 by Bing Crosby with Victor Young and His Orchestra
4. "Adeste Fideles", recorded November 12, 1935 by Bing Crosby with Victor Young and His Orchestra

Disc 3: (2189)

5. "O Little Town of Bethlehem", recorded November 18, 1938 by Kenny Baker and Eddie Dunstedter
6. "O Holy Night", recorded November 18, 1938 by Kenny Baker and Eddie Dunstedter

Disc 4: (2190)

7. "It Came Upon A Midnight Clear", recorded November 18, 1938 by Kenny Baker and Eddie Dunstedter
8. "Hark! The Herald Angels Sing", recorded November 18, 1938 by Kenny Baker and Eddie Dunstedter
