= Seasons (Bing Crosby album) =

Studio album by Bing Crosby
- Released: Late 1977
- Recorded: 1977
- Genre: Traditional pop
- Length: 36:56
- Label: Polydor
- Producer: Ken Barnes

Bing Crosby chronology
Bingo Viejo (1977)	Seasons (1977)	A Little Bit of Irish (posthumous edition, recorded in 1966) (1993)

Seasons is the forty-fifth and final studio album by American singer and actor Bing Crosby which was issued by Polydor Records under catalogue No. 2442 151. It was the final studio album completed before Crosby's death on October 14, 1977; it was released posthumously, and was marketed with the tagline "The Closing Chapter". Crosby was backed by Pete Moore and his Orchestra and the Johnny Evans Singers. Moore also did all the arrangements for the album, which was recorded at CBS Studios, Whitfield Street, London on September 12,13 & 14 1977 - except for one song "Spring Will Be a Little Late This Year" which was recorded at United Western Recorders, Sunset Boulevard, Hollywood on January 19, 1976. This song was also produced by Ken Barnes and arranged by Pete Moore.

== 2010 re-issue ==
The album was released on CD for the first time in 2010 by Collectors' Choice Music (catalogue No. CCM2104), featuring several previously unreleased bonus tracks.

Tracks 13–17 were poetry readings by Crosby recorded on September 14, 1977, for charitable purposes and for issue to the various Crosby fan clubs but they remained unissued until the Collectors' Choice CD in 2010.

Tracks 18–25 were taken from Bing's final recording session at the BBC's Maida Vale studios, London on 11 October 1977 with the Gordon Rose Orchestra. The arrangements were by Alan Cohen. This was for a radio show which was broadcast on BBC Radio 2 on December 27, 1977. The BBC LP REB 398 - ‘Bing - The Final Chapter’ captures this final performance.

== Reception ==
The album entered the UK album charts in December 1977 and remained there for seven weeks with a peak position of #25.

Variety commented: "If it were merely that this is the last recording Bing Crosby ever made, it would be more than enough reason to run and buy it. But it also happens to be a marvelous representation of the later Crosby years."

Billboard reviewed it and said: "This album is billed as the last commercial recording by the beloved crooner, who died one month after recording these tracks. This is a concept album in that it contains 12 songs which either deal with a specific time of the year or more generally on the passing of time. Excellent mix of rousing sing-along numbers like “June Is Bustin’ Out All Over” and “Sleigh Ride” (which feature some high-stepping female background singers) with more sophisticated, elusive melodies like “Autumn in New York.”"

== Track listing ==
Side one

No.	Title	Writer(s)	Length
1.	"Seasons"	Gilbert Bécaud, Ken Barnes	3:10
2.	"On the Very First Day of the Year"	Pete Moore, Ken Barnes	2:18
3.	"June in January"	Ralph Rainger, Leo Robin	2:55
4.	"Spring Will Be a Little Late This Year"	Frank Loesser	2:58
5.	"April Showers"	Buddy DeSylva, Louis Silvers	2:28
6.	"June Is Bustin' Out All Over"	Richard Rodgers, Oscar Hammerstein II	3:17

Side two

No.	Title	Writer(s)	Length
7.	"In the Good Old Summer Time"	George Evans, Ren Shields	2:45
8.	"Summer Wind"	Heinz Meier, Johnny Mercer	3:50
9.	"Autumn in New York"	Vernon Duke	3:26
10.	"September Song"	Kurt Weill, Maxwell Anderson	3:50
11.	"Sleigh Ride"	Leroy Anderson, Mitchell Parish	3:10
12.	"Yesterday When I Was Young"	Charles Aznavour, Herbert Kretzmer	3:23

== Track listing (2010 re-issue) ==
No.	Title	Writer(s)	Length
1.	"Seasons"	Gilbert Bécaud, Ken Barnes	3:10
2.	"On the Very First Day of the Year"	Pete Moore, Ken Barnes	2:18
3.	"June in January"	Ralph Rainger, Leo Robin	2:55
4.	"Spring Will Be a Little Late This Year"	Frank Loesser	2:58
5.	"April Showers"	Buddy DeSylva, Louis Silvers	2:28
6.	"June Is Bustin' Out All Over"	Richard Rodgers, Oscar Hammerstein II	3:17
7.	"In the Good Old Summer Time"	George Evans, Ren Shields	2:45
8.	"Summer Wind"	Heinz Meier, Johnny Mercer	3:50
9.	"Autumn in New York"	Vernon Duke	3:26
10.	"September Song"	Kurt Weill, Maxwell Anderson	3:50
11.	"Sleigh Ride"	Leroy Anderson, Mitchell Parish	3:10
12.	"Yesterday When I Was Young"	Charles Aznavour, Herbert Kretzmer	3:23
13.	"Around the Corner"	Anonymous	1:17
14.	"If—"	Rudyard Kipling	1:49
15.	"The Singers"	Henry Wadsworth Longfellow	1:22
16.	"Lucy Gray"	William Wordsworth	3:23
17.	"The Slave's Dream"	Henry Wadsworth Longfellow	2:03
18.	"Feels Good, Feels Right"	Ken Welch, Mitzi Welch	2:36
19.	"Nevertheless"	Harry Ruby, Bert Kalmar	2:56
20.	"The Only Way to Go"	Marvin Hamlisch, Tim Rice	2:56
21.	"Summer Wind"	Heinz Meier, Johnny Mercer	4:16
22.	"The Night Is Young and You're So Beautiful"	Dana Suesse, Irving Kahal, Billy Rose	3:50
23.	"There's Nothing That I Haven't Sung About"	Lyn Duddy, Jerry Bresler	3:39
24.	"As Time Goes By"	Herman Hupfeld	3:11
25.	"Once in a While"	Michael Edwards, Bud Green	2:53

== Charts ==
Chart (1978)	Peak position
Australia (Kent Music Report)	43
