= I Hear a Rhapsody =

1940 song by George Fragos, Jack Baker, and Dick Gasparre

"I Hear A Rhapsody"

Single by Jimmy Dorsey and His Orchestra (vocals Bob Eberly)
- B-side: "The mem'ry of a rose"
- Released: April 1941
- Recorded: December 9, 1940
- Length: 3:05
- Label: Decca 3570
- Songwriters: George Fragos, Jack Baker, and Dick Gasparre

Jimmy Dorsey and His Orchestra (vocals Bob Eberly) singles chronology
"The Breeze and I" (1941)	"I Hear A Rhapsody" (1941)	"Amapola (Pretty Little Poppy)" (1941)

"I Hear a Rhapsody" is a 1941 pop song that became a jazz standard, composed by George Fragos, Jack Baker, and Dick Gasparre. Written in 1940, in 1941 it was a top 10 hit for three separate artists, Charlie Barnet, Jimmy Dorsey and Dinah Shore. That same year, the tune was at the top of "Your Hit Parade".

“I Hear a Rhapsody” was also featured in the 1952 film noir Clash by Night, in which it was sung by Tony Martin. The soundtrack featured jazz notables such as pianist Gerald Wiggins, alto saxophonist Benny Carter, and tenor saxophonist Coleman Hawkins. The film, directed by Fritz Lang, involved a love triangle in a small fishing village and starred Barbara Stanwyck, Robert Ryan, and Paul Douglas.

== Versions ==
- Charlie Barnet and His Orchestra with Bob Carroll, recorded October 14, 1940 (10" shellac single, Bluebird, 1941)
- Jimmy Dorsey and His Orchestra with Bob Eberly, recorded December 9, 1940 (10" shellac single, Decca, 1941)
- Duke Ellington and His Orchestra with Herb Jeffries and Ben Webster, recorded January 15, 1941, in Hollywood (first released in the 1970s)
- Tommy Dorsey with Frank Sinatra, NBC radio performance from January 30, 1941 (first released in 1994 on The Song Is You)
- Frank Sinatra, single with "I Could Write a Book" in 1952 (10" release with I've Got a Crush on You, 1954)
- George Shearing on When Lights Are Low, 1955; with Jim Hall on First Edition, 1982; I Hear a Rhapsody - Live at the Blue Note, 1992
- Zoot Sims with Bob Brookmeyer on Tonite's Music Today, 1956
- Patti Page on Music for Two in Love, 1956
- John Coltrane on Lush Life, 1961
- Art Blakey on Art Blakey!!!!! Jazz Messengers!!!!!, 1961
