= Ernesto Lecuona =

Cuban composer and pianist (1895–1963)

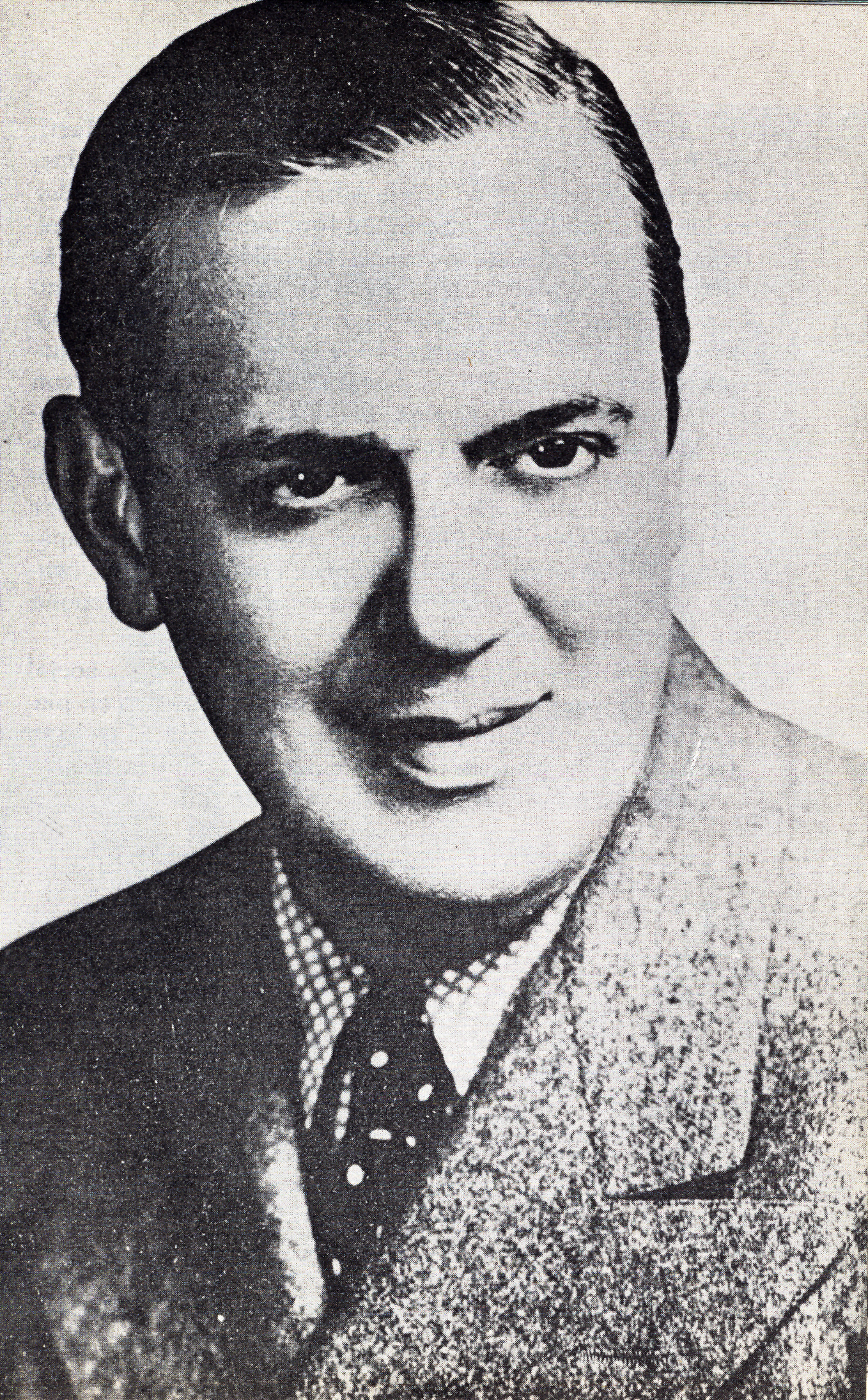
- Born: Ernesto Lecuona y Casado; August 7, 1896; Havana, Cuba
- Died: November 29, 1963 (aged 67); Santa Cruz de Tenerife, Spain
- Occupations: Musician, composer

Ernesto Lecuona y Casado (Spanish pronunciation: [eɾˈnesto leˈkwona]; August 7, 1896 – November 29, 1963) was a Cuban composer and pianist, many of whose works have become standards of the Latin, jazz and classical repertoires. His over 600 compositions include songs and zarzuelas as well as pieces for piano and symphonic orchestra.

In the 1930s, he helped establish a popular band, the Lecuona Cuban Boys, which showcased some of his most successful pieces and was later taken over by Armando Oréfiche. In the 1950s, Lecuona recorded several LPs, including solo piano albums for RCA Victor. He moved to the United States after the 1959 Cuban Revolution, and died in Spain in 1963.

== Early years ==
Lecuona was born in Guanabacoa, Havana, Cuba, Kingdom of Spain, to a Cuban mother and a Canarian father. There are inconsistencies surrounding his birthdate, with some sources indicating the year 1895, and others still giving the day as August 6. He started studying piano at the age of five, taught by his sister Ernestina Lecuona, a famed composer in her own right. As a child prodigy, he composed his first song at the age of 11. He later studied at the Peyrellade Conservatoire under Antonio Saavedra and Joaquín Nin. Lecuona graduated from the National Conservatory of Havana with a gold medal for interpretation when he was 17 years old. He performed outside of Cuba at the Aeolian Hall (New York) in 1916.

In 1918, he collaborated with Luis Casas Romero, Moisés Simons, Jaime Prats, Nilo Menéndez and Vicente Lanz in setting up a successful player piano music roll factory in Cuba producing Cuban music and also copies from masters made by QRS in the US. The brand label was "Rollo Autógrafo".

== Rise to fame ==
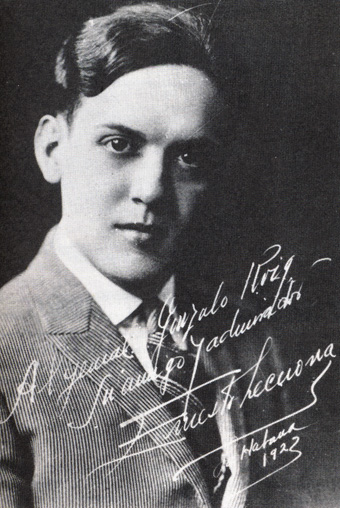
Ernesto Lecuona: dedicated to Gonzalo Roig

He first traveled to Spain in 1924 on a concert tour with violinist Marta de la Torre; his successful piano recitals in 1927 and 1928 at the Salle Pleyel in Paris coincided with a rise in interest in Cuban music. His popularity brought him to concert halls in Buenos Aires, Rio de Janeiro, and Lima in South America, as well as Paris, Nice, Barcelona, Madrid, and London in Europe, followed by more engagements in New York.

María la O, Lecuona's zarzuela, premiered in Havana on March 1, 1930. He was a prolific composer of songs and music for stage and film. He scored some of the film music for The Cuban Love Song, Always in My Heart, and One More Tomorrow. The entire musical score of the film Carnival in Costa Rica was penned by Lecuona. His works consisted of zarzuela, Afro-Cuban and Cuban rhythms, suites and many songs which are still famous. They include "Siboney" ("Canto Siboney"), "Malagueña" and "The Breeze And I" ("Andalucía"). In 1942, his hit, "Always in my Heart" ("Siempre en mi Corazón") was nominated for an Academy Award for Best Song; however, it lost to "White Christmas". Lecuona was a master of the symphonic form and conducted the Ernesto Lecuona Symphonic Orchestra, employing soloists including Cuban pianist and composer Carmelina Delfín. The Orchestra performed in the Cuban Liberation Day Concert at Carnegie Hall on October 10, 1943. The concert included the world premiere of Lecuona's Black Rhapsody. Lecuona gave help and the use of his name to the popular touring group, the Lecuona Cuban Boys, though he did not play as a member of the band. He did sometimes play piano solos as the first item on the bill.

== Final years and legacy ==
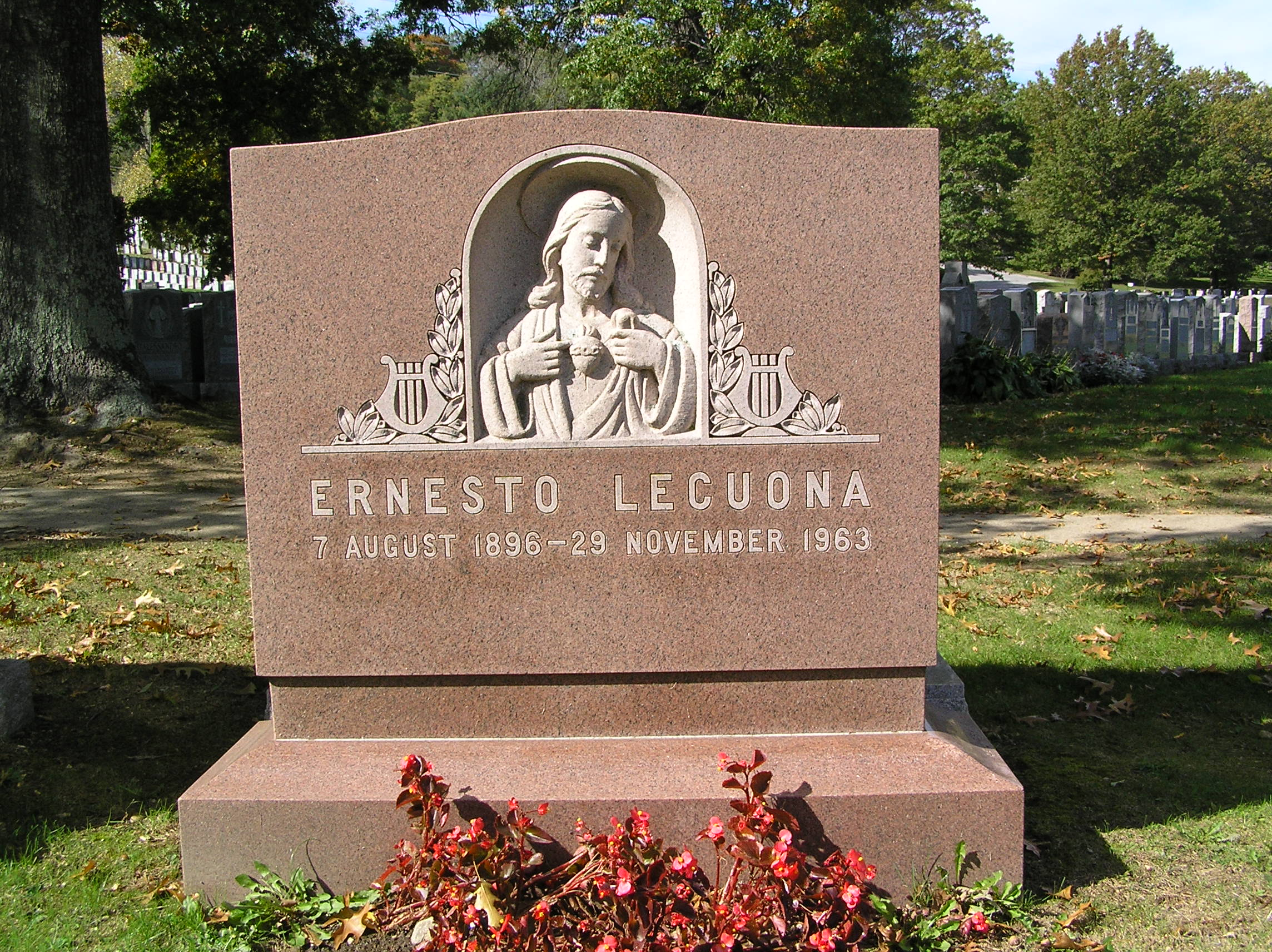
The grave of Ernesto Lecuona in Gate of Heaven Cemetery

In 1960, unhappy with Castro's new régime, Lecuona moved to Tampa, Florida and lived on West Orient Street in West Tampa with his relative, singer Esperanza Chediak. Lecuona lived his final years in the US. While traveling in the Canary Islands he died of a heart attack on November 29, 1963, in the town of Santa Cruz de Tenerife, where he had gone to recuperate from a lung ailment. He was interred at Gate of Heaven Cemetery in Hawthorne, New York, but his will instructed that his remains be repatriated after the Cuban régime changes. A great deal of Lecuona's music was first introduced to mass American audiences by Desi Arnaz, a fellow Cuban and Lucille Ball's spouse.

Lecuona's talent for composition has influenced the Latin American world in a way quite similar to George Gershwin in the United States, in his case raising Cuban music to classical status.

Ernesto and Ernestina's cousin Margarita Lecuona was another accomplished musician and composer. She was the author of the song "Babalú", made popular in the Latin American world by Miguelito Valdés, and in the United States by Desi Arnaz.

== Selected compositions ==
=== For piano ===
- Ante El Escorial
- Aragón
- Aragonesa
- San Francisco El Grande
- Siboney
- Suite Andalucía
  - Córdoba
  - Andalucía
  - Alhambra
  - Gitanerías
  - Guadalquivir
  - Malagueña
- Preludio En La Noche
- Valencia Mora
- Zambra Gitana

=== Waltz ===
- Apasionado
- Crisantemo
- La bemol
- Maravilloso
- Poético
- Romántico
- Si menor (Rococó)
- Vals Azul

=== Others ===
- Afro-Cuban suite
- Ahí viene el chino
- Al fin te vi
- Amorosa
- Andar
- Aquí está
- Arabesque
- Bell Flower
- Benilde
- Burlesca
- Canto del guajiro
- Cajita de música
- Como arrullo de palmas
- Como baila el muñeco
- Dame tu amor
- Danza de los Ñáñigos
- Danza Lucumí
- Diario de un niño
- Ella y yo
- ¡Échate pa'llá María!
- El batey
- El miriñaque
- El sombrero de yarey
- El tanguito de Mamá (también llamada A la Antigua)
- En tres por cuatro
- Eres tú el amor
- Futurista
- Gonzalo, ¡no bailes más!
- Impromptu
- Jungle Drums
- La 32
- La primera en la frente
- La Comparsa
- La conga de medianoche
- La habanera
- La danza interrumpida
- La mulata
- La negra Lucumí
- La Cardenense
- Los Minstrels
- Lola Cruz
- Lola está de fiesta
- Lloraba en sueños
- María la O
- Mazurka en glissando
- Muneca d
- Melancolía
- Mientras yo comía maullaba el gato
- Mis tristezas
- Muneca de Cristal
- Muñequita
- Negra Mercé
- Negrita
- ¡No hables más!
- No me olvides
- No puedo contigo
- Noche Azul
- Orquídeas
- Pensaba en ti
- Polichinela
- ¿Por qué te vas?
- Preludio en la noche
- ¡Que risa me da! Mi abuela bailaba así
- Rapsodia Negra
- Rosa, la china
- Siempre en mi corazon
- Tú serás
- Tres miniaturas
- ¡Y la negra bailaba!
- ¡Y sigue la lloviznita!
- Yo soy así
- Yumurí
- Zapateo y guajira
- Zenaida

== Recordings ==
- Lecuona Interpreta A Lecuona (RCA Victor, 1955, reissued in 1986 as Virtuoso), Lecuana performing on the piano
- Lecuona Plays for Two (RCA Victor, 1955), Lecuana performing on the piano

== See also ==
- Marcos Madrigal
