= Camilla Frydan =

Austrian operetta singer and composer

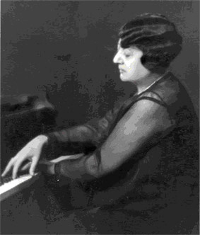
Camilla Frydan

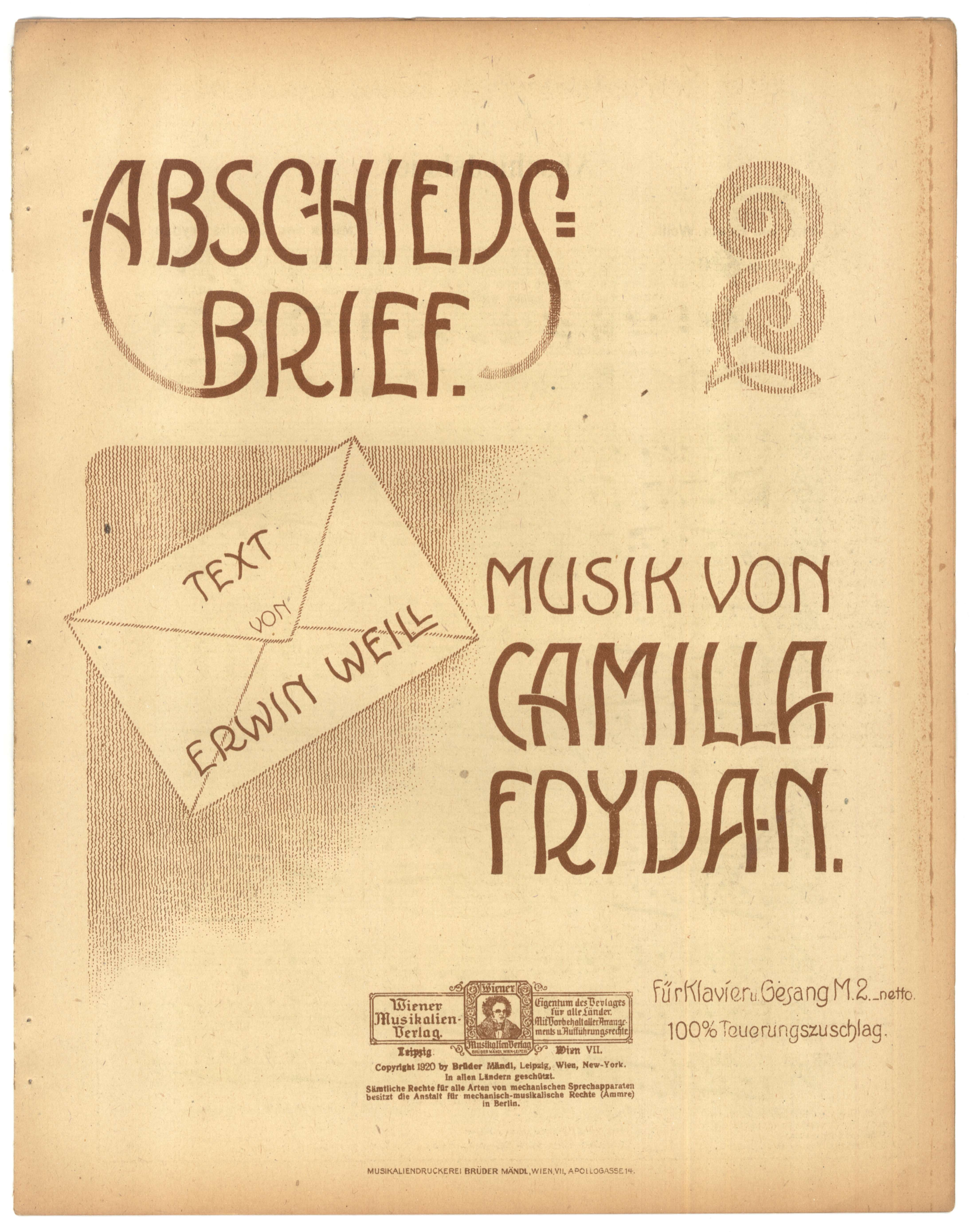
Frydan's "Abschiedsbrief" (c. 1920)

Camilla Frydan, birthname Herzl, married name Friedmann, pseudonym Herzer, (1887–1949) was an Austrian pianist, soubrette singer, composer and song writer. She performed in operettas and revues in Vienna and Berlin before she was forced to emigrate to the United States in 1938. She settled in New York where she produced hundreds of melodious numbers which were published by her Empress Music Publishing.

== Early life ==
Born in Wiener Neustadt on 3 June 1887, Camilla Frydan was the daughter of the bank employee Heinrich Herzl and his wife Cäcilie {née Königsberger). Her elder brother, Ludvig, and her younger sister, Clothilde, were also talented musicians.

In addition to her elementary and high school education, her brother taught her piano, harmony and composition. In 1901, she received further instruction in piano from Wilhelm Rauch at the conservatory as well as private lessons from the English concert pianist John Charles Mynotti. Her voice teacher was the chamber singer Marianne Brandt (1842–1921).

== Career ==
In 1907, she was engaged as a soubrette by the Raimund Theater and went on to work at the Neue Wiener Bühne and the Fledermaus cabaret. It was at the Fledermaus that she met Egon Friedell and his fellow performers, including his brother Oskar Friedmann, a librettist and journalist, whom she married on 15 July 1910 in the Evangelical Church in central Vienna. She had moved away from her Jewish ancestry, adopting the Christian faith. Their son Hans was born the following year.

Thanks to her husband, she also befriended several of the most successful composers of the times, including Franz Lehár, Edmund Eysler and Carl Michael Ziehrer. Inspired by the bohemian atmosphere of the Fledermaus, she composed her first melodious songs, using the pseudonym Frydan.

Among her most successful works was her vaudeville operetta Baron Menelaus which was premiered at Vienna's Rolandbühne in 1919, receiving acclaim from the critics. It was performed some 500 times in Vienna. Her revue Die große Trommel opened at Das Moderne Theater in April 1925 with its popular number "Fräulein, bitte, sind Sie musikalisch?" It was followed in 1926 by her operetta Liebesmagazin at the Neue Wiener Bühne with a libretto written by her husband. She conducted it herself. Collaboration between husband and wife ended prematurely in November 1929 when Oscar Friedmann, a diabetic, died after a leg amputation.

In the 1930s, her career brought her to Berlin, where she created numerous revues for the city's smaller theatres. Particularly successful were Nachtausgabe and Koche mit G'spuss at the Westen-Theater in 1935.

== Emigration ==
She returned to Vienna in 1937 but owing to her Jewish background, from March 1939 she was threatened by the Nazi occupation. Her brother in law, Egon Friedell, committed suicide by jumping out of the window when members of the SA visited his apartment. Before they could be arrested, Frydan and her son managed to escape a few days later, first to Switzerland, where she spent a year in Zürich. During her stay, she composed her symphony In the dark of the night.

After her brother Ludwig died in nearby St. Gallen in April 1939, she decided to emigrate to the United States. Together with her sister and her son, she reached New York on the MS Vulcania in November 1939. Her compositions in the United States included "Musical Revue", "Ladies know how" and "One kiss for tomorrow". They were issued by Empress Music Publishing which she established with her son in 1945.

It is estimated that she had composed some 500 individual numbers.

Camilla Frydan died in New York City on 13 June 1949. She is buried in the Austrian Jews section of Mount Moriah Cemetery.

== See also ==
- List of Austrians in music
