= Albert Gamse =

American lyricist

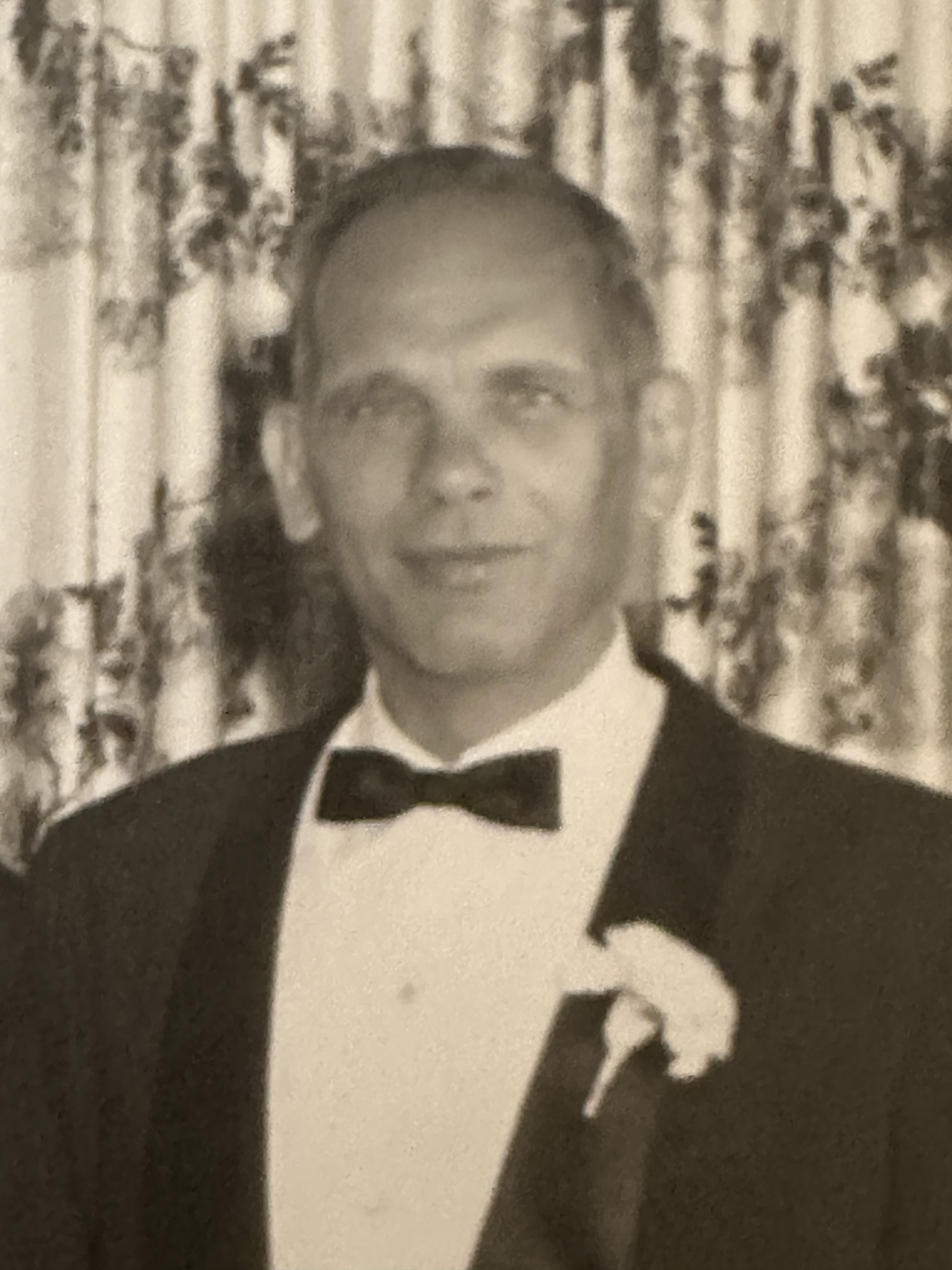
Albert Gamse Bronx, NY 1956

Albert Gamse (pronounced Gams-ee) (1901 – 1974) was an American lyricist.

== Biography ==
Albert Gamse was born in Latvia to a Jewish family and later emigrated to the United States, settling in the Bronx, NY, where he spent most of his life. In 1953, he moved into the basement apartment of a two-family house on Corsa Avenue, owned by his first cousin, Lydia Heymanson Flax. After Lydia's husband, William, died unexpectedly in 1953, Albert moved in to help support Lydia, her five children, and her sister, Rebecca "Joan" Heymanson. Lydia's children affectionately called him "Uncle Albert." Known for his brilliance, kindness, and generosity, Albert, who never married, was a devoted New York Times crossword enthusiast, solving the puzzles regularly.

Gamse was a lyricist for songs that were sung by Dinah Shore, Desi Arnaz and Xavier Cugat, among others.

Gamse wrote lyrics for the Presidential Anthem of the United States, "Hail to the Chief".

== Notable songs ==
- Helen-Polka (with Walt Dana and Jimmy Carroll)
- Amapola
- "Chantez, Chantez" (with Irving Fields)
- La Raspa (song, with Harold Grant)
- Managua, Nicaragua (with Irving Fields)
- Miami Beach Rhumba (with Irving Fields)
- Mine for a Moment (with Camilla Frydan)
- One Kiss For Tomorrow (with Camilla Frydan)
- Something New from Mr. Saturday Night (with Nilo Menéndez, performed by Benny Goodman)
- Yours (Quiéreme Mucho) (with Jack Sherr)

== Books ==
World's Favorite Sing Along Songs of the Gay Nineties
