= Teatro Martí =

Neoclassical theater in Havana, Cuba

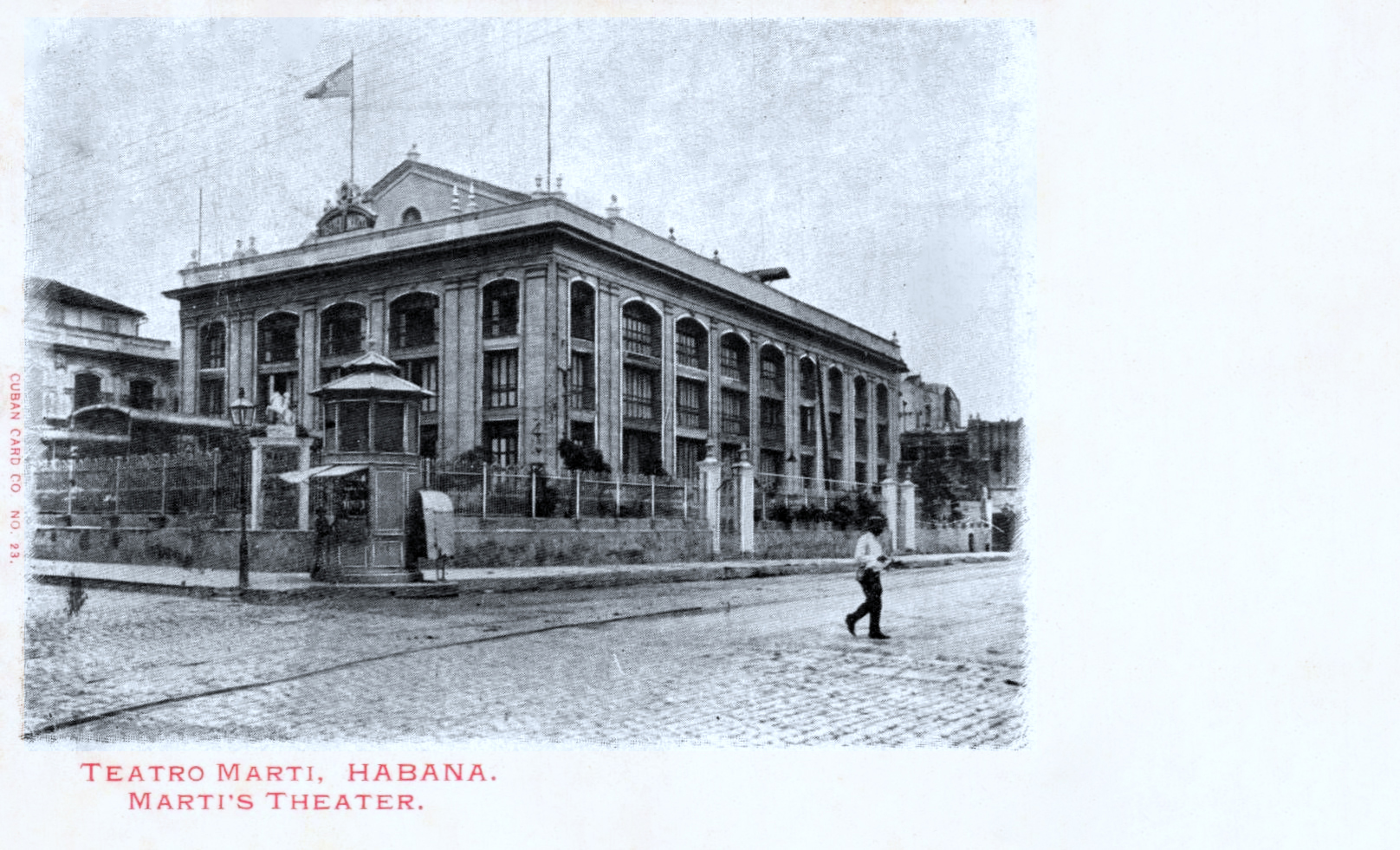
Photo of the theater circa 1903.

Teatro Martí is a Neoclassical theater in Havana, Cuba. It was inaugurated on 8 June 1884 as the Teatro Irijoa, named after its founder and owner Ricardo Irijoa, from the Basque Country, Spain. It was originally used for the performance of zarzuelas and vaudevilles, as well as meetings of the Partido Autonomista. In 1899, it was renamed Eden Garden, before changing its name again a year later to Teatro José Martí. In 1901, it held the Convención Constituyente which established the independent Republic of Cuba. At the time, it had a capacity of 1,200 persons.

The theater was abandoned in the 1970s before reopening on 24 February 2014 in the presence of Raúl Castro. In 2015, it was awarded the Premio Nacional de Restauración. In 2016, the restored Teatro Martí appeared on Cuban postage stamps.

== See also ==
- List of buildings in Havana
