= Armando Oréfiche =

Cuban composer and pianist (1911–2000)

Armando Oréfiche (Havana, Cuba 5 June 1911 – Las Palmas de Gran Canaria, December 2000) was a Cuban composer and pianist in the mid-20th century.

Oréfiche was one of many artists who played with the Lecuona Cuban Boys between 1935 and 1938.

Oréfiche led the Armando Oréfiche and his Havana Cuban Boys band, a ballroom rumba band, until the 1980s when they dissolved. Oréfiche subsequently took a position as pianist at the five-star Hotel Reina Isabel of Las Palmas de Gran Canaria.
