= Joseph Lacalle =

José María Lacalle
- Born: 17 November 1859; Cádiz, Spain
- Died: 11 June 1937 (aged 77); Brooklyn, United States
- Occupations: Clarinetist, composer, conductor
- Known for: composing the song "Amapola" (1920)

José María Lacalle García, known in the United States as Joseph M. Lacalle (17 November 1859 – 11 June 1937), was a Spanish-American clarinetist, composer, conductor and music critic. He is best known for composing the song "Amapola". His surname is misspelled LaCalle in some sources.

== Biography and career ==
José María Lacalle García was born in Cádiz, Spain. He began his musical studies in his hometown, which he would continue in Havana, Cuba, where he emigrated at a very young age. Later on emigrated to the United States in 1884, sailing from the Port of Havana, to the Port of New York on the S/S Newport. He performed on woodwind instruments with several popular bands, including the John Philip Sousa Band, the Patrick Gilmore Band, the 7th Regiment Band, the Hoadley Musical Society Amateur Orchestra, and the Columbia Spanish Band. He conducted his own band, the Lacalle Band, and the 23rd Regiment Band. Lacalle directed instrumental groups for Columbia between 1917 and 1929, and participated in early recordings for other recording companies.

Lacalle composed numerous songs and marches, including Twenty-third Regiment March (1902), Pobrecito Faraon (1923), Amapola (1920), Aquel Beso (1927) and The Light That Never Fails (Luz Eterna) (1928).

Amapola is originally composed with Spanish lyrics and performed instrumentally. Amapola was first recorded instrumentally by Cuban Orquesta Francesa de A. Moreno for Columbia in February 1923. Spanish tenor Miguel Fleta made the first vocal recording in 1925. In 1935, the Lecuona Cuban Boys released their rendition of the song as a single, recorded in 1935 in Paris.

Since its debut "Amapola" has been a favorite recording of opera tenors including Tito Schipa (1926), Nino Martini (1941), Jan Peerce (1950), Alfredo Kraus (1959) and Luigi Alva (1963). In the early 1940s, Amapola was given English lyrics by Albert Gamse for the american audience.The song was then recorded by several artists including Jimmy Dorsey, whoseversion hit #1 on the Billboard charts. Amapola also reached #1 on Your Hit Parade in 1941.

In later life, Lacalle worked as a music critic for Columbia Phonograph Company. He founded the Spanish Theater Company in Brooklyn and presented Zarzuelas to American audiences. He was also influential in promoting Spanish and Cuban music. He died in Brooklyn, New York, in 1937 at the age of 76.
