= Lecuona Cuban Boys =

Cuban popular band during the 30's and 40's

Lecuona Cuban Boys Muchachos cubanos de Lecuona
- Also known as: Orquesta Encanto
- Years active: 1931–
- Past members: Ernesto Lecuona; Armando Oréfiche; Ernesto "Jaruco" Vázquez; Adalberto "Chiquito" Oréfiche; Agustin Bruguera; Gerardo Bruguera; Jesús Bertomeu; Jorge Domínguez; Daniel González; Guillermo Hernández; Enrique López Rivero; Alberto Rabagliati; Fernando Torres

The Lecuona Cuban Boys (LCB; Spanish: Muchachos cubanos de Lecuona) was a popular Cuban orchestra which toured the world for over forty years.

The band was founded by Ernesto Lecuona, whose role was that of a patron-entrepreneur. He did not actually play with the band, but sometimes gave a piano recital before the band played. The core of the band was put together in 1931 as Orquesta Encanto; the band changed name early in 1934. On tour in Europe, in 1934, Lecuona returned to Cuba, and Armando Oréfiche took charge of the band in Europe. Ernesto gave them the gift of his name, which, at the time, was a property well worth having, and the right to use a number of his compositions.

The LCB was exceptionally strong in arrangements, compositions, and instrumental quality (most of them could play two or three instruments). Their only weak spot was the lack of a really first-rate Cuban singer, but that was not so important as might seem because they played so often to non-Latin audiences. Some of their pick-up singers could sing in English, and many of their numbers were instrumentals. The band played the full range of Cuban popular music, but their speciality was the conga. Though it was perhaps Eliseo Grenet who first composed a conga in its ballroom dance style, it was certainly the LCB who took it round the world and made it famous. The LCB was therefore the first conjunto to use the conga drum regularly in its performances, and not Arsenio Rodríguez, as is often supposed.

The band initially organized itself as a collective, but in practice Armando Oréfiche (composer, arranger, pianist) was the leader. Other band members were Ernesto "Jaruco" Vázquez (trumpeter, guitarist, composer, arranger); Adalberto "Chiquito" Oréfiche (tenor sax and bongo); Agustin Bruguera (timbales, conga, voice); Gerardo Bruguera (tenor sax and clarinet); Jesús Bertomeu (trombone); Jorge Domínguez (alto sax, clarinet, violin); Daniel González (alto sax, clarinet, violin); Guillermo Hernández (guitar, tumba, guiro, maracas); Enrique López Rivero (trumpet) 1932-1934; Alberto Rabagliati (voice) engaged 1934; later Fernando Torres (voice), Fernando Díaz and Luis Escalante were engaged as replacement trumpeters. In 1947 Bob (Irv) Mesher joined the group after a brief stint with Tito Puente, Tito Rodriguez and Pupi Campo. Irv took over the lead chair when Jaruco Vazquez left the band.

Until 1939, the Lecuona Cuban Boys toured the most luxurious casinos and theaters of pre-war Europe, sharing the stage with figures such as Maurice Chevalier, Josephine Baker and Raquel Meller, making recordings for the main record labels, radio stations and the newly born television broadcasting. At the beginning of World War II, the orchestra continued its tours in Latin America, performing in Argentina, Brazil, Puerto Rico, Peru, Uruguay and Venezuela.

After World War II there was a dispute within the band, which ended in a split. Armando Oréfiche left with a few members, started the Havana Cuban Boys; the rest stayed under the old name and settled in New York in 1949.

In December 1950 they returned to Havana to perform with Josephine Baker and Roland Gerbeau at the Teatro América (La Habana), and to inaugurate television in Cuba. In 1951 they toured South America and in 1952 they returned to Cuba, where they sold out seasons in theaters and cabarets.

During the fifties they toured alternately between South America and Europe, with such memorable performances as those in 1953-1954 at the inauguration of the Hotel Tamanaco in Caracas and at the 10th Conference of Foreign Ministers, held in the Venezuelan capital itself, where they shared the stage with the Chucho Sanoja orchestra.

The orchestra continued touring until the mid-seventies and finally retired in 1975.

== Movies ==
- Aimée & Jaguar (German)
- Thrills of Music
- Marlowe (2022)

== Appearances ==
"Rhumba Azul" was played at the funeral (1st Oct 1942) of German WWII fighter ace (158 victories) Hans-Joachim Marseille (aged 22). Marseille "played [it] over and over until the close of day".
