= Anti-Nowhere League discography =

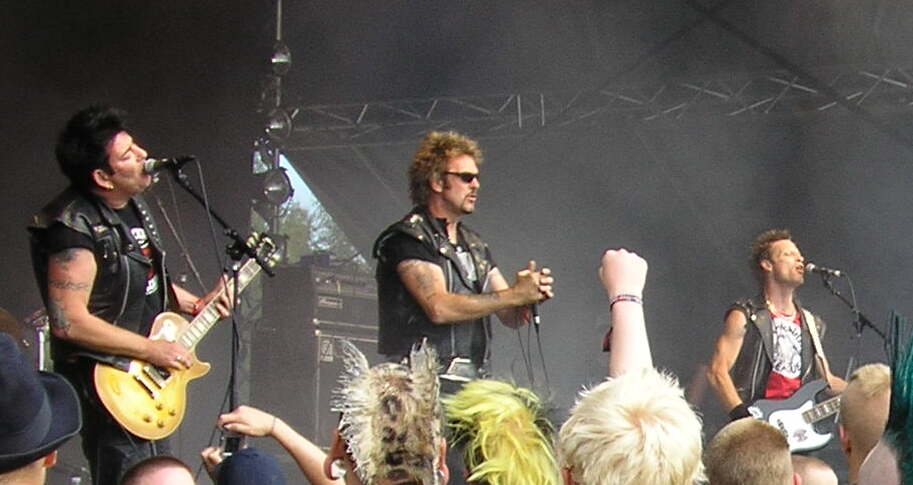
- Anti-Nowhere League performing in 2007
- Studio albums: 8
- EPs: 4
- Live albums: 8
- Compilation albums: 13
- Singles: 9
- Video albums: 1

This is the discography of British punk band Anti-Nowhere League.

== Albums ==
=== Studio albums ===
Title	Album details	Peak chart positions	
Title	Album details	UK	UK Indie
We Are...The League	Released: April 1982; Label: WXYZ; Formats: LP, MC	24	1
The Perfect Crime	Released: 11 May 1987; Label: GWR; Formats: LP, MC	—	—
Scum	Released: 17 November 1997; Label: Knock Out; Formats: CD, LP, MC	—	—
Kings & Queens	Released: 6 December 2005; Label: Captain Oi!; Formats: CD	—	—
The Road to Rampton	Released: 5 November 2007; Label: Nowhere; Formats: CD	—	—
We Are...The League...Un-cut	Released: 28 October 2014; Label: Self-release, Cleopatra; Formats: CD, digital download; Re-recording of debut album	—	—
The Cage	Released: 13 May 2016; Label: Cleopatra; Formats: CD, digital download	—	—
League Style	Released: 2 June 2017; Label: Cleopatra; Formats: CD, LP, digital download	—	—
"—" denotes releases that did not chart or were not released in that territory.

=== Live albums ===
Title	Album details	Peak chart positions	
Title	Album details	UK	UK Indie
Live in Yugoslavia	Released: July 1983; Label: I.D.; Formats: LP, MC	88	2
Live and Loud!!	Released: 1990; Label: Link; Formats: CD, LP	—	—
Live Animals	Released: July 1994; Label: Step-1 Music; Formats: CD; Combines most of Live In Yugoslavia and Live and Loud	—	—
The Horse Is Dead	Released: 1996; Label: Receiver; Formats: CD	—	—
Return to Yugoslavia	Released: 1998; Label: Knock Out; Formats: CD, MC	—	—
Secret Radio Recordings	Released: February 2007; Label: Dream Catcher; Formats: CD	—	—
We're the League – Live!!!!!	Released: 2009; Label: Airline; Formats: CD	—	—
So What Tour 1982 Live!	Released: 9 August 2019; Label: Cleopatra; Formats: LP, digital download	—	—
"—" denotes releases that did not chart or were not released in that territory.

=== Compilation albums ===
Title	Album details
Long Live the League	Released: April 1985; Label: Dojo; Formats: CD, LP; Combines tracks from Live in Yugoslavia with tracks from We Are...The League with several other rare tracks
The Best of the Anti-Nowhere League	Released: 3 February 1992; Label: Streetlink; Formats: CD; Contains the full 12" of "Out on the Wasteland" and four missing Live in Yugoslavia tracks.
Complete Singles Collection	Released: January 1995; Label: Anagram; Formats: CD; Is a reissue of all 7/12-inch singles until 1995
Anthology	Released: November 1999; Label: Eagle; Formats: 2xCD; Second CD contains the entire Live and Loud album
So What	Released: July 2000; Label: Harry May; Formats: CD; Contains unreleased versions of "Woman" and studio version of "Noddy"
Out of Control	Released: 11 July 2000; Label: Receiver; Formats: CD; Contains demos recorded before We Are...The League
Punk Singles and Rarities 1981–1984	Released: 1 May 2001; Label: Captain Oi!; Formats: CD; Contains tracks from Apocalypse Punk Tour 81, as well as singles and demos of famous League songs
Animal! The Very Best of the Anti-Nowhere League 1981–1998	Released: November 2001; Label: Anagram; Formats: CD
Pig Iron – The Album	Released: 17 August 2006; Label: Nowhere; Formats: CD; Contains a newly remastered copy of their Scum album along with their Pig Iron EP and three new tracks
So What?: Early Demos and Live Abuse	Released: 16 October 2006; Label: Castle Music; Formats: 2xCD, digital download; Combines the live album The Horse is Dead with the studio album Out of Control
The Punk Rock Anthology	Released: 23 May 2008; Label: Anagram; Formats: CD
Long Live the League	Released: 14 October 2016; Label: Westworld; Formats: 2xCD
The Albums 1981–87	Released: 22 February 2018; Label: Captain Oi!; Formats: 4xCD box set

=== Video albums ===
Title	Album details
Hell for Leather	Released: June 2008; Label: Dream Catcher; Formats: DVD

== EPs ==
Title	Album details
Anti-Nowhere League	Released: June 1982; Label: WXYZ; Formats: 12"; US-only release
Punky Party E.P.	Released: December 1982; Label: Flexipop; Formats: 7"; Split EP with the Defects and the Meteors that features the Anti-Nowhere League's "World War III", released with Flexipop magazine
Pig Iron	Released: April 1996; Label: Impact; Formats: CD, 10"
Anti-Nowhere League / The Damn Garrison	Released: May 2014; Label: Rebel Sound; Formats: 7"; US-only split EP with the Damn Garrison

== Singles ==
Title	Year	Peak chart positions		Album
Title	Year	UK	UK Indie	Album
"Streets of London"	1981	48	1	We Are...The League
"I Hate...People"	1982	46	1	We Are...The League
"Woman"	1982	72	1	We Are...The League
"For You"	1982	126	3	Non-album singles
"Out on the Wasteland"	1984	89	3	Non-album singles
"Crime" (US promo-only release)	1987	—	—	The Perfect Crime
"Fuck Around the Clock"	1990	—	—	Non-album singles
"This Is War" (limited Czech Republic-only release)	2011	—	—	Non-album singles
"Dance of the Dead"	2017	—	—	Better off Zed soundtrack
"—" denotes releases that did not chart or were not released in that territory.
