= Best of the Anti-Nowhere League =

Greatest hits album by Anti-Nowhere League
- Released: October 1992
- Genre: Punk rock
- Label: Streetlink

Anti-Nowhere League chronology
Punk Singles and Rarities 1981–1984 (1992)	Best of the Anti-Nowhere League (1992)	Kings and Queens (2005)

Best of the Anti-Nowhere League is the first compilation album by English punk rock band Anti-Nowhere League. It contains the full 12" of Out on the Waterfront and four tracks that were absent from the Live in Yugoslavia album.

== Track listing ==
1. Streets of London
2. I Hate People
3. We Are the League
4. Let's Break the law
5. Animal
6. Woman
7. Rocker
8. For You
9. Ballad of JJ Decay
10. Out on the Wasteland
11. We Will Survive
12. Queen and Country
13. On the Waterfront
14. Let the Country Feed You (Live)
15. Going Down (Live)
16. Snowman (Live)
17. So What (Live)
