= Long Live the League =

Compilation album by Anti-Nowhere League
- Released: April 1985
- Genre: Punk rock
- Label: Dojo Records

Anti-Nowhere League chronology
| Out on the Wasteland | Long Live the League (1985) | The Perfect Crime (1987) |

Professional ratings
Review scores
| Source | Rating |
|---|---|
| AllMusic | 2/5 stars |

Long Live the League is the first compilation album by English punk rock band the Anti-Nowhere League. It consists of tracks made up of material from Live in Yugoslavia, We Are... The League and the A & B Sides of the For You/Out on The Wasteland EP.

The only rare track is the version of "On the Waterfront", which differs from the version on The Perfect Crime. This version is more guitar-based and less synth-based, it comes from the same 1984 session that also produced the "Out on the Wasteland" 12" single.

== Track listing ==
1. "We Are the League"
2. "Streets of London" (Ralph McTell)
3. "So What" (Live)
4. "Let's Break the Law"
5. "Ballad of J.J. Decay"
6. "Woman"
7. "Snowman"
8. "’Reck-A-Nowhere"
9. "Let the Country Feed You" (Live)
10. "Going Down" ( Live)
11. "I Hate People"
12. "For You"
13. "We Will Survive"
14. "Out on the Wasteland"
15. "On the Waterfront"
16. "Queen and Country"
