= So What (Anti-Nowhere League album) =

Compilation album by Anti-Nowhere League
- Released: July 2000
- Genre: Punk rock
- Label: Harry May Record Company

Anti-Nowhere League chronology
Anti Nowhere League - Anthology (1999)	So What (2000)	Punk Singles and Rarities 1981 - 1984 (2001)

So What is the fifth compilation album by English punk rock band Anti-Nowhere League. It contains mostly well known studio tracks along with a mix of live tracks, once again taken from the Live in Yugoslavia album. At the 2000 VH1 Music Awards, Metallica performed a cover of the song "So What?" off the album.

"Woman" appears in an unreleased version, as well as a rare studio version of "Noddy", after the live version had already been released on The Horse is Dead.

== Track listing ==
1. "So What?"
2. "We Are the League"
3. "I Hate People"
4. "Snowman"
5. "Nowhere Man"
6. "Animal"
7. "Woman"
8. "(We Will Not) Remember You"
9. "World War III"
10. "For You"
11. "Noddy"
12. "Let's Break the Law"
13. "Streets of London"
14. "Can't Stand Rock 'n' Roll"
15. "Reck-a-Nowhere"
16. "We Will Survive"
17. "Out on the Wasteland"
18. "Queen and Country"
19. "Paint It Black" (Live)
20. "Let the Country Feed You" (Live)
