= So What =

So What may refer to:

== Law ==
- Demurrer, colloquially called a "So what?" pleading

== Music ==
=== Albums ===
- So What (Anti-Nowhere League album) or the 1981 title song (see below), 2000
- So What?: Early Demos and Live Abuse, by Anti-Nowhere League, 2006
- So What (George Russell album), 1987
- So What (Jerry Garcia and David Grisman album), 1998
- So What (Joe Walsh album), 1974
- So What? (Ron Carter album), 1999
- So What? (While She Sleeps album) or the title song, 2019
- So What, an EP by Le Shok, 1998

=== Songs ===
- "So What" (Miles Davis composition), 1959
- "So What", by Johnny Kidd & the Pirates, 1961
- "So What", by Bill Black, 1962
- "So What", by Ray Rush, 1962
- "So What", by John Kander and Fred Ebb from Cabaret, 1966
- "So What", by Crass from The Feeding of the 5000, 1978
- "So What", by the Cure from Three Imaginary Boys, 1979
- "So What", by Liverpool Express, 1983
- "So What", by Ministry from The Mind Is a Terrible Thing to Taste, 1989
- "So What", by Gilbert O'Sullivan, 1990
- "So What?" (Anti-Nowhere League song), 1981; covered by Metallica, 1993
- "So What", by John Cale from Walking on Locusts, 1996
- "So What!", by Jane's Addiction from Kettle Whistle, 1997
- "So What", by Ken Carson from Project X, 2021
- "So What!!", by the Lyrics, included on Nuggets: Original Artyfacts from the First Psychedelic Era, 1965–1968, 1998 reissue
- "So What", a song from the Bratz Rock Angelz soundtrack, 2005
- "So What" (Field Mob song), 2006
- "So What" (Pink song), 2008
- "So What?", by Far East Movement from Free Wired, 2010
- "So What", by Three Days Grace from Human, 2015
- "So What", by Zebrahead from Walk the Plank, 2015
- "So What" (Xu Weizhou song), 2017
- "So, What?", by Band-Maid from Just Bring It, 2017
- "So What", by BTS from Love Yourself: Tear, 2018
- "So What" (Loona song), 2020
- "So What", by STAYC from Staydom, 2021
- "So What", by Carl Carlton
- "So What", by Grazina
- "So What", by Pinegrove from 11:11 (2022)
- "So What", by Fitz and the Tantrums on the deluxe edition of Let Yourself Free, 2023
- "So What", by Yeat from Lyfestyle, 2024
- ”So What?”, by Ice Spice from the deluxe version of Y2K!, 2024
- "So What", by Tomorrow X Together from 7th Year: A Moment of Stillness in the Thorns, 2026
- "So What", by MUNA from Dancing on the Wall, 2026
