= Live Animals (album) =

Live album by Anti-Nowhere League
- Released: 2002
- Genre: Punk rock
- Label: Step 1

Anti-Nowhere League chronology
Punk Singles and Rarities 1981–1984 (1992)	Live Animals (2002)	Kings and Queens (2005)

Live Animals is the sixth live album by English punk rock band Anti-Nowhere League. It contains tracks recorded at various times at various shows, but all have either appeared on Live In Yugoslavia or Live and Loud.

== Track listing ==
1. Animal
2. Lets Break the Law
3. Streets of London (McTell)
4. For You
5. Can't Stand Rock ‘n’ Roll
6. We Will Survive
7. Going Down
8. Let the Country Feed You
9. Queen And Country
10. Johannesburg
11. Crime
12. Branded
13. Something Else
14. On the Waterfront
15. So What!
16. Snowman
17. Fuck Around the Clock
