= Spiral Staircase =

A spiral staircase is a type of stairway characterized by its helical shape

Spiral Staircase may also refer to:

== Books ==
- The Spiral Staircase: My Climb Out Of Darkness, a 2005 book by Karen Armstrong

== Films ==
- The Spiral Staircase (1946 film), an American psychological thriller film
- The Spiral Staircase (1961 film), a 1961 American film
- The Spiral Staircase (1975 film), a British remake of the 1946 film
- The Staircase (1998 film), a television film about the spiral staircase at the Loretto Chapel
- The Spiral Staircase (2000 film), a television film remake of the 1946 film

== Music ==
- Spiral Staircase (Ralph McTell album), 1969
- Spiral Staircase – Classic Songs, a 1997 compilation album by Ralph McTell
- "Spiral Staircase", a 2003 song by Kings of Leon from Youth & Young Manhood
- Spiral Staircase (D'espairsRay DVD), 2008

== See also ==
- Spiral Starecase, an American band
- "Spiral Stairs", nickname of Scott Kannberg
- The Circular Staircase (1908), mystery novel by Mary Roberts Rinehart
