= Return to Yugoslavia =

Live album by Anti-Nowhere League
- Released: 1998
- Recorded: December 1997
- Genre: Punk rock
- Label: Impact

Anti-Nowhere League chronology
Scum (Anti-Nowhere League album)	Return to Yugoslavia	Anti Nowhere League - Anthology

Professional ratings
Review scores
Source	Rating
Scream Magazine	4/6

Return to Yugoslavia is a 1998 live album by English punk rock band Anti-Nowhere League.

== Track listing ==
1. "For You"
2. "Snowman"
3. "Scum"
4. "Reck-A-Nowhere"
5. "Get Ready"
6. "I Hate People"
7. "The Great Unwash"
8. "Woman"
9. "Fucked Up and Wasted"
10. "Streets of London"
11. "We Are the League"
12. "Let's Break the Law"
13. "Burn 'Em All"
14. "Can’t Stand Rock 'n' Roll"
15. "Long Live Punk"
16. "So What!"

== Personnel ==
- Animal (Nick Culmer) − vocals
- Magoo (Chris Exall) − guitar, backing vocals
- Beef − guitar, backing vocals
- JJ Kaos − bass, backing Vocals
- Revvin Taylor − drums
