= The Horse Is Dead =

Live album by Anti-Nowhere League
- Released: 1996
- Genre: Punk rock
- Label: Receiver

Anti-Nowhere League chronology
Pig Iron EP	The Horse Is Dead	Scum

The Horse Is Dead is a live album by English punk rock band Anti-Nowhere League, released in 1996.

The album was later re-released as disc one of the two disc double album So What?: Early Demos and Live Abuse, as well as the 1999 complete re-release Live: So What?

== Track listing ==
1. "So What"
2. "Pig Iron"
3. "For You"
4. "Crime"
5. "Working for the Company"
6. "Animal"
7. "Nowhere Man"
8. "I Hate People"
9. "Let's Break the Law"
10. "Noddy"
11. "Snowman"
12. "Ballad of J.J. Decay"
13. "Wreck-a-Nowhere"
14. "Runaway"
15. "We're the League"
