= Marvelous Marterie =

Studio album by Ralph Marterie and the Marlboro Men
- Released: May 1959
- Recorded: Universal Recorders, Chicago, IL, 1956–1959
- Genre: Big band
- Label: Wing

Marvelous Marterie is a studio album released by Ralph Marterie and his Marlboro Men in 1959 on Wing LP record MGW 12154 (mono) and SRW 12511 (stereo).

== Background ==
This album was in Mercury's budget Wing line. It was recorded between December 1956 and April 1959. Most of the individual recordings were never otherwise released by Mercury, although “When My Sugar Walks Down the Street” was also released on Mercury 45 rpm #71488, and “Trombone Blues” was also released under the title “Private Eyeball” on the full-priced LP Music For A Private Eye (Mercury MG 20437, SR 60109)

== Track listing ==
1. Somebody Loves Me (Gershwin – DeSylva – Macdonald)
2. Can't We Be Friends? (Swift - James)
3. Deep Purple (Peter DeRose)
4. Lonely Winter (arr. George Stone)
5. Trombone Blues (S. Allen – R. Marterie)
6. When My Sugar Walks Down the Street (Irving Mills – Jimmy McHugh – Gene Austin)
7. Rain (Eugene Ford)
8. Stars Fell on Alabama (Frank Perkins – Mitchell Parish)
9. Sentimental Journey (Les Brown – Ben Homer – Bud Green)
10. I'll Be Around (Alec Wilder)
11. Love Song from “Houseboat” (J. Livingston – Ray Evans)
