= Complete Singles Collection (Anti-Nowhere League album) =

Compilation album by Anti-Nowhere League
- Released: 1995
- Genre: Punk rock
- Label: Anagram

Anti-Nowhere League chronology
Best of the Anti-Nowhere League	Complete Singles Collection	Pig Iron EP

Complete Singles Collection is the third compilation album by English punk rock band Anti-Nowhere League. It contains all the non LP releases up to 1995 on one disc. This album is part of Anagrams punk collectors series.

== Track listing ==
1. Streets of London
2. So What
3. I Hate People
4. Let's Break the Law
5. Woman
6. Rocker
7. World War III (Live)
8. For You
9. Ballad of JJ Decay
10. Out on the Wasteland
11. We Will Survive
12. Queen and Country
13. So What (Live)
14. I Hate People (Live)
15. Snowman (Live)
16. Fuck Around the Clock (Live)
