= Somebody Loves Me =

1924 song by George Gershwin

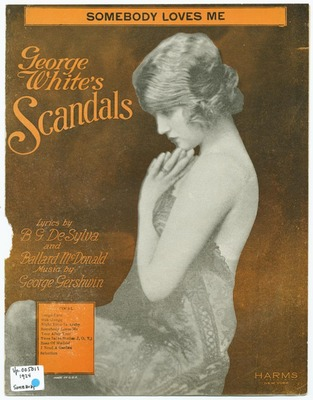
- Sheet music cover, 1924

Song
- Published: 1924
- Composer: George Gershwin
- Lyricists: Ballard MacDonald; Buddy DeSylva

Audio sample
- 1924 instrumental rendition by the Paul Whiteman Orchestra, released by Victor: file; help

"Somebody Loves Me" is a popular song, with music written by George Gershwin, and lyrics by Ballard MacDonald and Buddy DeSylva. The song was published in 1924 and featured in George White's Scandals of 1924.

This is not to be confused with the Southern gospel song written by W.F. & Marjorie Crumley.

The first recordings of "Somebody Loves Me" were a number of popular versions in 1924 and 1925 by Paul Whiteman, Ray Miller, Marion Harris and Cliff Edwards (aka Ukulele Ike) with the Whiteman version being top-rated.

== The Four Lads recording ==
- One of the later better-known versions was by The Four Lads. This recording was made on August 18, 1952, and released by Columbia Records as catalog number 39865. It first reached the Billboard magazine charts on October 18, 1952. It peaked at #22 on the charts.

== Other recorded versions ==
- Tex Beneke
- Margot Bingham
- Boots and his Buddies – as "The Somebody"
- Dave Brubeck
- Benny Carter
- Sonny Clark
- Alma Cogan – recorded in 1952 and included in the CD The A-Z of Alma (1994).
- Nat King Cole
- Perry Como – included on his album We Get Letters (1957)
- Ray Conniff
- Bing Crosby – rec. June 14, 1939; released as Brunswick 02807 in the UK, matrix DLA 1777. A later version was included in his album Some Fine Old Chestnuts (1953).
- Vic Damone
- Doris Day – recorded in December 1950 for Columbia Records.
- Tommy Dorsey
- Roy Eldridge
- Duke Ellington
- Herb Ellis
- Percy Faith and his orchestra
- Eddie Fisher – included on his album I Love You (1955).
- Ella Fitzgerald – Ella Fitzgerald Sings the George and Ira Gershwin Songbook (1959) and her Verve/Polygram release: "Jazz at the Philharmonic, the Ella Fitzgerald Sets".
- Helen Forrest
- The Four Freshmen – 4 Freshmen and 5 Trombones (1955)
- Erroll Garner
- George Gershwin
- Banu Gibson
- Dizzy Gillespie
- Jackie Gleason
- Johnny Green and his Orchestra – World Program Service transcription 200-5628
- Benny Goodman and his orchestra – rec. November 5, 1936; released as Victor 25497, matrix 02458-1.
- Ferde Grofe – AMPICO Piano Roll assisted, Number 205171-E; Dated 9-1924
- Lionel Hampton
- Ted Heath
- Fletcher Henderson and his orchestra
- Ruthie Henshall (1994)
- Woody Herman and his orchestra
- Lena Horne – rec. June 4, 1943; from the movie Broadway Rhythm (1944)
- Alberta Hunter
- Dick Hyman
- Harry James and his orchestra
- Joni James – recorded for her album Joni Sings Sweet (1959).
- Bert Kaempfert and his orchestra
- Henry Lange
- Peggy Lee
- Oscar Levant
- Oscar Peterson
- Buddy DeFranco
- Guy Lombardo and his Royal Canadians
- Julie London – included on the album Julie (1957)
- Frankie Lymon and the Teenagers
- Maureen McGovern
- The McGuire Sisters
- Don McLean
- Ralph Marterie
- Meat Loaf in collaboration with Larry Adler (also 1994)
- Melanie
- Johnny Mercer
- Red Norvo Trio
- Isabelle & Tom Patricola – rec. July 23, 1924; released as Vocalion B 14866, matrix 13513.
- Les Paul
- Johnny Paycheck
- Oscar Peterson – rec. November or December 1952; released on the LP Oscar Peterson Plays Gershwin (1953).
- The Platters – included on their album Remember When? (1959).
- Django Reinhardt
- Buddy Rich
- Maurice Rocco
- Dinah Shore – rec. December 10, 1940; released as Bluebird B10978, matrix BS 058246-1.
- Frank Sinatra
- Stuff Smith
- Aileen Stanley – rec. September 9, 1924; released as Victor 19454, matrix B-30807-3.
- Art Tatum
- Bud Powell
- Dame Kiri Te Kanawa
- Jack Teagarden with Eddie Condon and His Orchestra – rec. December 12, 1944; released as Decca 23430, matrix 72633.
- Dinah Washington – included in The Complete Dinah Washington on Mercury, Vol. 5 (1956–1958).
- Paul Weston and his orchestra
- Lester Young with Nat King Cole and Buddy Rich – rec. 1946; released 1951 on a Mercury Records 10-inch LP as The Lester Young Trio
- Zoot Sims 1975 with Bucky Pizzarelli on guitar, Milt Hinton on bass, and Buddy Rich on drums
- Diana Krall and Tony Bennett 2018

== Film appearances ==
- Broadway Rhythm (1944) – sung by Lena Horne
- Rhapsody in Blue (1945) – performed by Tom Patricola and Joan Leslie (dubbed by Sally Sweetland).
- Lullaby of Broadway (1951) – sung by Doris Day and Gene Nelson (dubbed by Hal Derwin)
- Somebody Loves Me (1952) – played throughout the film and sung at the end by Betty Hutton and Ralph Meeker
- Pete Kelly's Blues (1955) – sung by Peggy Lee

== See also ==
- List of 1920s jazz standards
