= Pig iron (disambiguation) =

Pig iron is an intermediate form of iron produced from iron ore.

Pig iron may also refer to:

- Pig Iron – The Album, by Anti-Nowhere League
- Pig Iron Theatre Company, a theater group located in Philadelphia, PA, US
- Robert Menzies (1894–1978), Australian Prime Minister known as "Pig Iron Bob"
- Peter Porkchops, a character from the DC Comics series Captain Carrot and His Amazing Zoo Crew, known as Pig-Iron
