= Complete Singles Collection =

Complete Singles Collection or Complete Single Collection may refer to:

- Complete Singles Collection (Anti-Nowhere League album), 1995
- The Complete Singles Collection 1994–2000, a 2002 album by The Unseen
- Complete Single Collection '97–'08, a 2008 album by The Brilliant Green
- Complete Single Collection, an album by Cute
