= Irene Beasley =

American singer

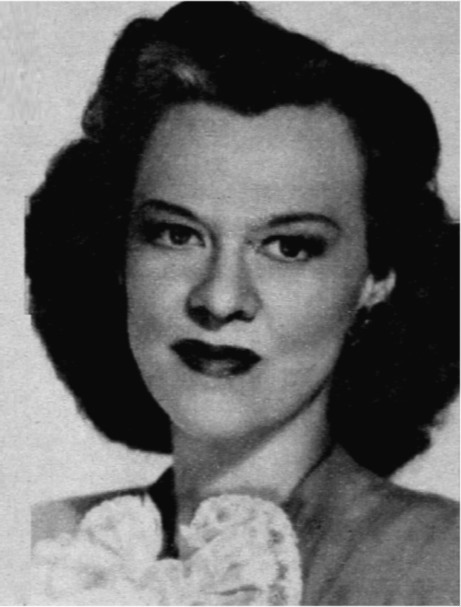
- Beasley in 1949
- Born: Elizabeth Irene Beasley; January 28, 1904; Whitehaven, Tennessee
- Died: January 7, 1980 (aged 75); Ardsley, New York
- Occupation: Singer

Elizabeth Irene Beasley (January 28, 1904 – January 7, 1980), known as the "long, tall gal from Dixie," was a singer and master of ceremonies best known for her work on old-time radio.

== Early years ==
Born Elizabeth Irene Beasley, before she was 2 years old, she was singing several children's songs. When she was 3 years old, she sang for a Sunday School Children's Day program. At 4, she played piano by ear.

Beasley's family moved to Amarillo, Texas, when she was 6 years old, and she attended primary and secondary schools there. She went to Sweet Briar College, in Virginia.

Beasley taught music and mathematics in a school in Lamont, Mississippi. During time off from teaching, "she sold records in a phonograph shop and sang the latest songs in a five-and-ten."

== Radio ==
Beasley "pioneered the idea of singing commercials, and handled many for Procter & Gamble."

Sources differ on when Beasley began appearing on radio. One says that she began singing with Francis Craig's orchestra on WSM in Nashville in 1925. Another says that her debut in radio came in 1928 in Memphis, Tennessee, when she sang her own composition. The New Orleans Times-Picyaune on Oct 7, 1928, p 29 quotes her as saying in 1924 she approached radio artist Art Gillham, "The Whispering Pianist" asking him to sing her newly published song "If I Could Just Stop Dreaming." He told her "If you can carry a tune at all, you can do your own advertising and it will be an asset to the song. Just make 'em like it." She said that gave her the courage to sing on radio.In 1924 she sang it on WMC in Memphis, then Chicago stations. She became billed as a blues singer "the long tall gal from Dixie." She made records for Victor. By 1931 she had become "staff artist" at KMOX in St. Louis, Missouri.

In the early 1930s, she "costarred with Ted Husing every Thursday over CBS." She also had her own 15-minute program three nights a week on CBS. On July 15, 1934, she launched her own program on NBC. In 1935, she sang on the Monday and Friday editions of a program headlined by organist Jesse Crawford.

In 1938, she developed R.F.D. #1, a CBS program that Radio Guide described as "a 'one man' show of music and homely commentary dedicated largely to America's farm women." Beasley was the writer, director, and sole actor for the program, which debuted July 4, 1938.

In the early 1940s, Beasley starred in Neighbors, a daytime program on the "Dixie Loop of CBS." She was also the writer, producer, and host of Grand Slam, a musical quiz program that was broadcast 1943-1953.

A national magazine named Beasley "Queen Of Radio" in 1934.

== Stage and nightclubs ==
Beasley "performed for a year in Chicago theaters, studios, and clubs." Later, she "performed in nightclubs and vaudeville houses throughout the country and starred in the musical comedy Thumbs Up."

== Composing ==
When she was a teacher, Beasley wrote her first song and convinced her father to have it published. During a vacation, she was a pianist for a radio station in Memphis when station officials persuaded her to sing on the air. That resulted in her performing her composition and being paid for it. As time went on, she wrote other songs and eventually signed with Victor Records, singing her own compositions.

== Later years ==
In the 1950s, Beasley retired from radio and devoted her efforts to real estate.

== Death ==
Beasely died of pneumonia January 7, 1980, in Ardsley, New York. She was 75.
