= Art Gillham =

American songwriter (1895-1961)

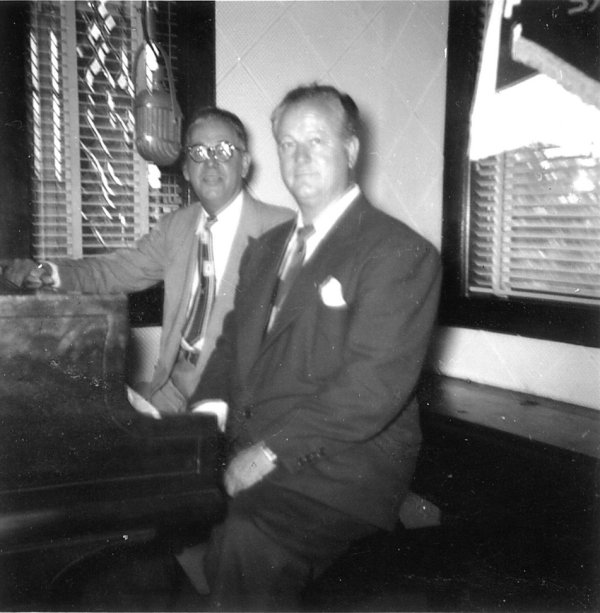
- Art Gillham (l.) and singer-songwriter Gene Austin at Atlanta's WQXI (September, 1953).
- Born: January 1, 1895. St. Louis, Missouri, U.S.
- Died: June 6, 1961 (aged 66); Atlanta, Georgia, U.S.
- Occupations: songwriter, singer

Art Gillham (January 1, 1895 – June 6, 1961) was an American songwriter who was among the first crooners, a pioneer radio artist, and a recording artist for Columbia Records.

With Billy Smythe and Scott Middleton he wrote "Hesitation Blues", which he also recorded as one of the first electrical recordings for Columbia Records(Rust). The song is heard in the following movies The Public Enemy, Of Human Bondage and Fireman Save My Child (IMDB). Gillham and Smythe wrote approximately 100 songs together, including "Mean Blues", "Just Forget", "The Deacon Told Me I Was Good", "Just Waiting for You", "Crying Again", "Things That Remind Me of You" (sheet music) and the first successful electrical recording, "You May Be Lonesome" (Rust). With J. Russell Robinson he wrote "In My Sweetheart's Arms".

== Radio pioneer ==
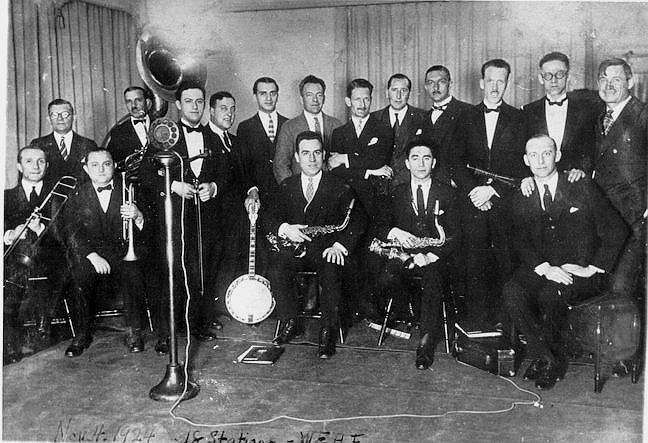
The Eveready Hour (November 4, 1924).

As a song plugger for Ted Browne Music, Art Gillham traveled around the United States. (multiple contemporary newspapers) When radio began he would stop at radio stations in his travels to promote the music by Browne and other music publishers. In 1923 Gillham was dared to sing over the radio, and the response encouraged him to continue. He sang in a soft crooning voice, and in February, 1924, while appearing on WSB (AM) in Atlanta, he was dubbed "The Whispering Pianist" by the station's general manager, Lambdin Kay. (Atlanta Journal, February 24, 1924). In 1924 he gave advice to Irene Beasley that encouraged her to begin her radio and recording career.

On November 4, 1924, he appeared with Will Rogers, Wendell Hall and Carson Robison during the Presidential Election Night broadcast of The Eveready Hour over WEAF and an 18-station hook-up. Before networks were formed Gillham appeared on over 300 radio stations. (numerous contemporary newspapers) Sometimes he broadcast from airfields with a portable keyboard on the field. (photos from his scrapbook) In 1930 he had two CBS programs: "Breakfast With Art" and "Syncopated Pessimism". (Newspaper articles and radio schedules) He ended his radio programs with the question "Have you got a cup of coffee in your pocket?"

From 1937 through 1954 Art appeared on radio in Atlanta, Georgia. In December 1939 he was featured in the first demonstration of television in the South at Atlanta's Rich's Department Store. World War II delayed the commercial introduction of television in Atlanta until 1949. Gillham appeared frequently as a guest on WAGA-TV. From 1937 he had regular radio programs on Atlanta's WSB (AM), WGST and WQXI. (newspaper articles and broadcast listings) He concluded his career in radio at WQXI after two heart attacks damaged his coordination in 1954.

On October 21, 2017, he was inducted into the Georgia Radio Hall of Fame, as a legacy inductee.

== Columbia recording artist ==
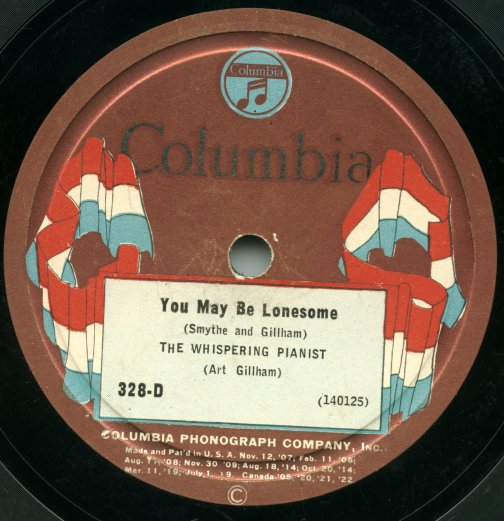
The label of the first Western Electric recording.

First Electrical recording master to be released.

In October 1924, Gillham signed a contract with Columbia Records as an exclusive artist. When Columbia obtained rights to record using the new Western Electric recording system, Gillham was asked by Columbia to assist with the electric recording because of his use of microphones on radio. (Walsh, Hobbies Magazine and recorded interview) On February 25–27, 1925 Art recorded seven electrical masters, six of which were released. (Brian Rust The Columbia Master Book Discography, Vol. III, p 19-20) Columbia began using the new electrical process with its other artists beginning on February 27, 1925. The first electrical master was 140125, "You May Be Lonesome" released on Columbia 328-D, the first issue being on Columbia's "flag" label prior to the change to the black label. Victor began using the electrical process in March 1925.

Gillham was a popular artist with Columbia from 1924 through 1931. His 130 recordings included "Angry", "I'm Confessing", "Shine On, Harvest Moon", "I'd Climb the Highest Mountain", "Cecilia", "I'm Waiting for Ships That Never Come In", "Thinking", and "Tenderly". Most of his recordings were vocals with his piano accompaniment. Some recordings included small groups which included Red Nichols, Benny Goodman, Miff Mole, Jimmy Dorsey and others.

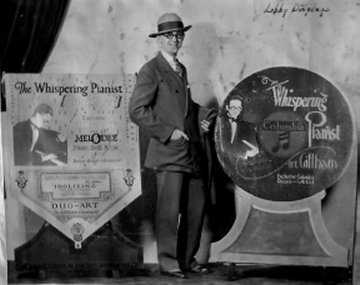
Lobby display for Art Gillham records and piano rolls.

Being a tall thin man with thick wavy hair, he created an image of himself on radio and records as an old fat bald man who was always having trouble with women and thus sang "sob songs", and a folio was published "Art Gillham's Sob Songs" (Triangle Music). His primary competitors were Gene Austin, Jack Little, Cliff Edwards and Jack Smith. Jack Smith began recording for Victor in the fall of 1925. Victor set him up as a direct competitor by calling him the "Whispering Baritone" or Whispering Jack Smith and alleged Art Gillham was imitating Jack Smith. On Victor's 1925 test recording of Jack Smith he was actually listed as "Whispering Pianist" (Discography of American Historical Recordings). Columbia began advertising Art Gillham as "Famous Enough to Be Imitated". (advertising saved in his scrapbook)

In 1926 Columbia imported record presses to Sydney, Australia. The first Australian Columbia pressing was Gillham's "In Your Green Hat" and "It's Too Late to Be Sorry Now". His recording of "My Swanee River Home" was released only in Australia. (Rust) In 1928 he made several recordings for Columbia under the pseudonym "Barrel-House Pete" (Discography of American Historical Recordings).

Before recording for Columbia Gillham made several unissued recordings for Gennett, then a couple for Pathé. His first recording for Columbia in 1924 was "How Do You Do". His last recording for Columbia in 1931 was "Just A Minute More to Say Goodbye". In 1934 he made a final commercial recording for Victor which was released on its Bluebird label. In the 1940s and 1950s he made over 200 home recordings for friends (Internet Archive).

In addition to phonograph records, Art Gillham also recorded piano rolls on the Columbia, Supertone, Mel-O-Dee, Vocalstyle and Duo-Art labels. While recording for Columbia he made regular tours of the Pantages and Loews vaudeville circuits in the South and West. However, his whispering style was not as successful in theaters as they did not have microphones. Everywhere he appeared on stage he also appeared on radio and in music and record stores. Window displays featured his recordings and piano rolls.

== Sources ==
- George Blau, "Art Gillham Waiting For Ships: Bio-Discography" Internet Archive 2018
- Brian Rust, The Columbia Master Book Discography, Volume III, first electrical recordings pp 19–20, Greenwood Press, 1999.
- Brian Rust, Jazz and Ragtime Records 1897-1942, Mainspring Press, 2002.
- Brian Rust, The Complete Entertainment Discography Arlington, 1973.
- Sutton, Allan, Recording The Twenties - Evolution Of American Recording Industry 1920-1929, pp167, 200, Mainspring Press, 2008.
- Michael Pitts and Frank Hoffman, The Rise Of The Crooners, pp 16–29, Scarecrow Press, 2002.
- Donald Russell Connor, BG On The Record - A Bio-Discography Of Benny Goodman, Arlington, 1969.
- Roger Kinkle, The Complete Encyclopedia of Popular Music And Jazz 1900-1950, Arlington House, 1974.
- Tom Lord, The Jazz Discography, Lord Music Reference, 1992.
- Ross Laird, Tantalizing Tingles.
- Joseph Csida, American Entertainment: A Unique History of Popular Show Business, Watson-Guptill, 1978.
- Thomas A. Delong, Radio Stars An Illustrated Biographical Dictionary Of 953 Performers 1920-1960, 1996.
- Jim Walsh, Art Gillham in Hobies Magazine, September, 1957.
- Woody Backensto, Art Gillham in Record Research, March, 1963.
- Unpublished: the Art Gillham Scrapbook contains newspaper clippings, sheet music, photos.
- "Phonograph and Talking Machine Weekly", numerous issues 1924 forward.
- "Atlanta Journal", February 24, 1924, and numerous later issues.
- Georgia Music Hall of Fame (University of Georgia) has 78 rpm recordings.
- Newspaper articles and ads concerning Gillham can be found in a name search of newspaper online archives.

"Discography: https://adp.library.ucsb.edu/index.php/talent/refer/75785.
