= Eight Frames a Second =

Studio album by Ralph McTell
- Released: February 1968 (UK); May 1969 (US)
- Recorded: October 1967
- Studio: Pye (London)
- Genre: Folk; folk rock; country blues
- Length: 38:54
- Label: Transatlantic (UK); Capitol (US)
- Producer: Gus Dudgeon

Ralph McTell chronology
Eight Frames a Second (1968)	Spiral Staircase (1969)

Eight Frames a Second is the debut album by British folk musician Ralph McTell. Released in the UK in 1968, it is notable for being the first record produced by Gus Dudgeon, and the first arranged by Tony Visconti. Unusually for a new artist, the front of the album sleeve contained no reference to either McTell or the album title. The entire album cost £350 in total. Ralph's first single was also released entitled Summer Come Along, but not included in the album.

== Track listing ==
All songs composed by Ralph McTell, except where noted.

Side one

1. "Nanna's Song" – 3:05
2. "The Mermaid and the Seagull" – 4:05
3. "Hesitation Blues" (traditional; arranged by Ralph McTell) – 2:43
4. "Are You Receiving Me?" – 3:37
5. "Morning Dew" (Bonnie Dobson; arranged by Fred Neil) – 3:10
6. "Sleepytime Blues" – 3:50

Side two

1. "Eight Frames a Second" – 3:20
2. "Willoughby's Farm" – 2:00
3. "Louise" – 3:45
4. "Blind Blake's Rag" (traditional; arranged by Ralph McTell) – 1:55
5. "I'm Sorry – I Must Leave" – 2:15
6. "Too Tight Drag" (Blind Blake) – 2:29
7. "Granny Takes a Trip" (Geoff Bowyer, Christopher Joe Beard) – 2:40

== Personnel ==
- Ralph McTell – guitar, vocals
- Mac McGann – double-neck guitar
- Mick "Henry VIII" Bartlett – jug
- "Whispering Mick" Bennett – washboard
- Bob Strawbridge – mandolin
- Tony Visconti – arrangements and musical direction

Technical

- Bobby Davidson – cover photography
- Nickolas Venet – coordinator

== Awards and accolades ==
Ralph McTell was presented with a Gold Disc of Eight Frames a Second during his 60th birthday concert at the Royal Festival Hall in November 2004.

== Release history ==
Country	Date	Label	Format	Catalogue	Notes
United Kingdom	1968	Transatlantic	LP	TRA165	Mono
United States	1969	Capitol	LP	ST240	Remixed to stereo
Canada	1969	Capitol	LP	ST240	Remixed to stereo
South Africa	1975	Logo	LP	LGD6001	Record 2 of 2-LP set "2 Originals of Ralph McTell"
France	1978	Transatlantic	LP	TRA89554/5	Record 1 of 2-LP set. Record 2 is "Spiral Staircase"
Australia	1980	Transatlantic/ 7 Records	LP	MLM400	
United Kingdom	2007	Transatlantic	CD	TRRCD400	'Expanded Edition' with four previously unreleased bonus tracks.

Many of the tracks on this album also feature on the Spiral Staircase - Classic Songs compilation.

== Track variations ==
The LP released in South Africa in 1975 omits "Nanna's Song", "The Mermaid and the Seagull" and "Hesitation Blues", that are included on Record 1 of the 2-LP set.

The UK 2007 CD release includes four bonus tracks:

14. "Suzanne" (Leonard Cohen) (1)
15. "I Love My Baby" (Traditional; arranged by Ralph McTell) (2)
16. "Boodle Am Shake" (Traditional; arranged by Ralph McTell) (2)
17. "San Francisco Bay Blues" (Jesse Fuller) (3)

(1) From the original album recording sessions
(2) Live concert recording from 1967
(3) Demo recording with Rick Wakeman (piano).
