= When My Sugar Walks Down the Street =

"When My Sugar Walks Down the Street (All the Little Birdies Go Tweet-Tweet-Tweet)"
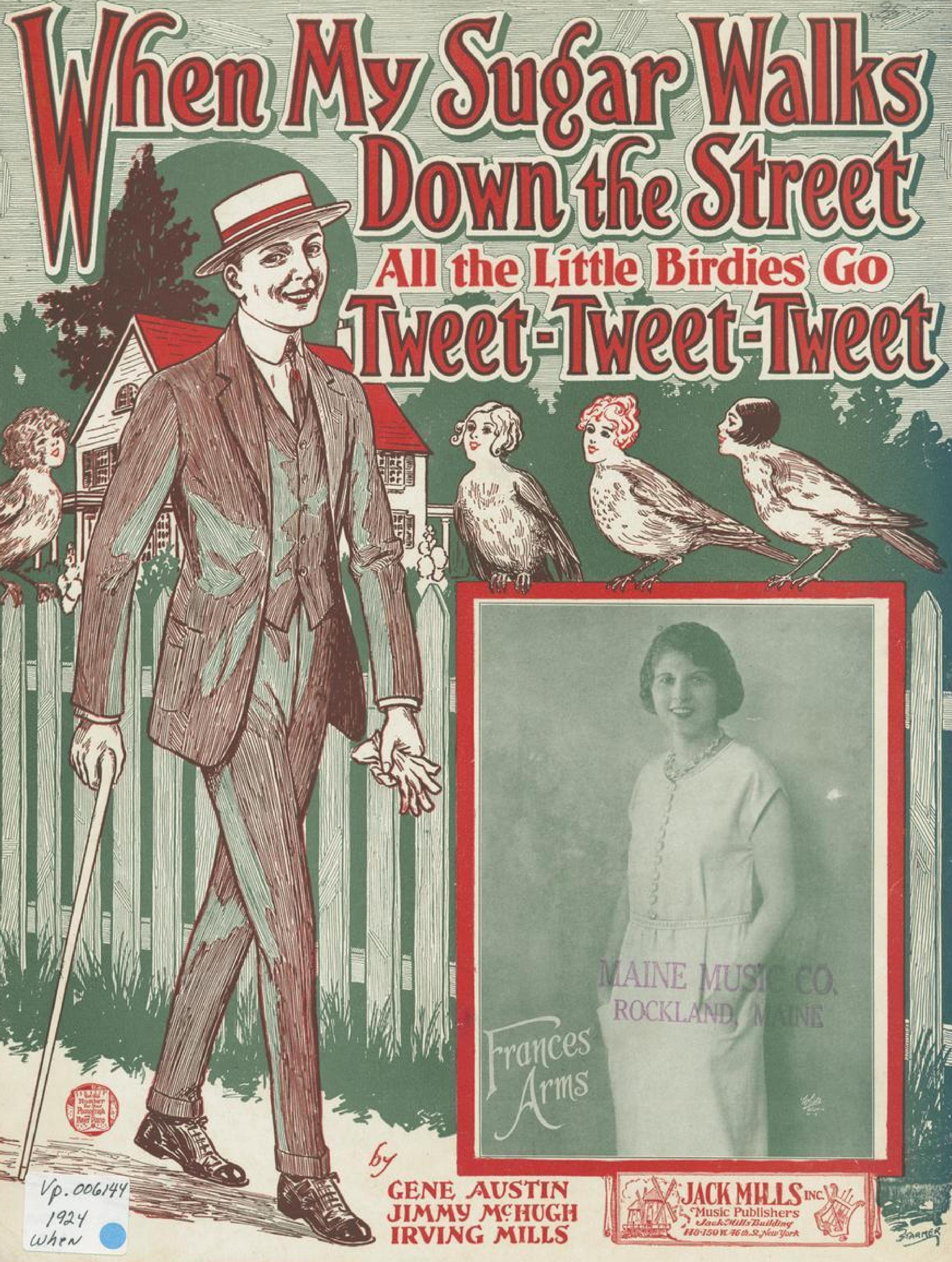
- Sheet music cover, 1924

Song by Gene Austin
- Published: 1924
- Recorded: 1925
- Songwriters: Gene Austin, Jimmy McHugh, Irving Mills

"When My Sugar Walks Down the Street (All the Little Birdies Go Tweet-Tweet-Tweet)" is a 1920s jazz standard, written by Gene Austin, Jimmy McHugh and Irving Mills in 1924.

The Victor Talking Machine Company (which years later would be bought by RCA and renamed RCA Victor at the end of 1928) made the first major recording of the song in January 1925. In his autobiography, Nathaniel Shilkret, who was a Victor A&R executive at the time and soon to replace Edward T. King as Victor's Director of Light Music, described the events leading to the recording:

It was Austin who demonstrated the song when Mills Music presented it to Victor for recording. Shilkret liked Austin's voice and paired Aileen Stanley, a top Victor artist, with Austin, unknown at the time, as vocalists, to be accompanied by Shilkret directing the Victor orchestra (see EDVR for details of the recording). The recording was extremely popular and launched Austin's career.

According to H. Allen Smith, Austin complained that Shilkret recommended that it be sung primarily by Aileen Stanley, with Austin singing little more than "tweet-tweet-tweet" (see). The original recording is commercially available on CD, and in the actual recording, stars Stanley and Shilkret, with his orchestra, are featured for 60 seconds and 70 seconds, respectively, and the unknown Austin for 30 seconds.

"When My Sugar Walks Down the Street (All the Little Birdies Go Tweet-Tweet-Tweet)" was recorded by Duke Ellington, Nat King Cole, Bing Crosby (for his album Bing Crosby's Treasury - The Songs I Love), The Ink Spots, Hot Lips Page, Johnny Mathis, The Four Freshmen, Bix Beiderbecke, Red Nichols' Five Pennies, Ella Fitzgerald, Ralph Marterie, Sy Oliver, and the Wolverines Orchestra. It should have been used for the 1954 musical movie A Star Is Born sung by Judy Garland and Jack Baker, but did not appear on the final edit nor on the director's cut (track released on the 2004 edition of the soundtrack by Sony).

== See also ==
- 1924 in jazz
