= Al Bernard =

American singer (1888–1949)

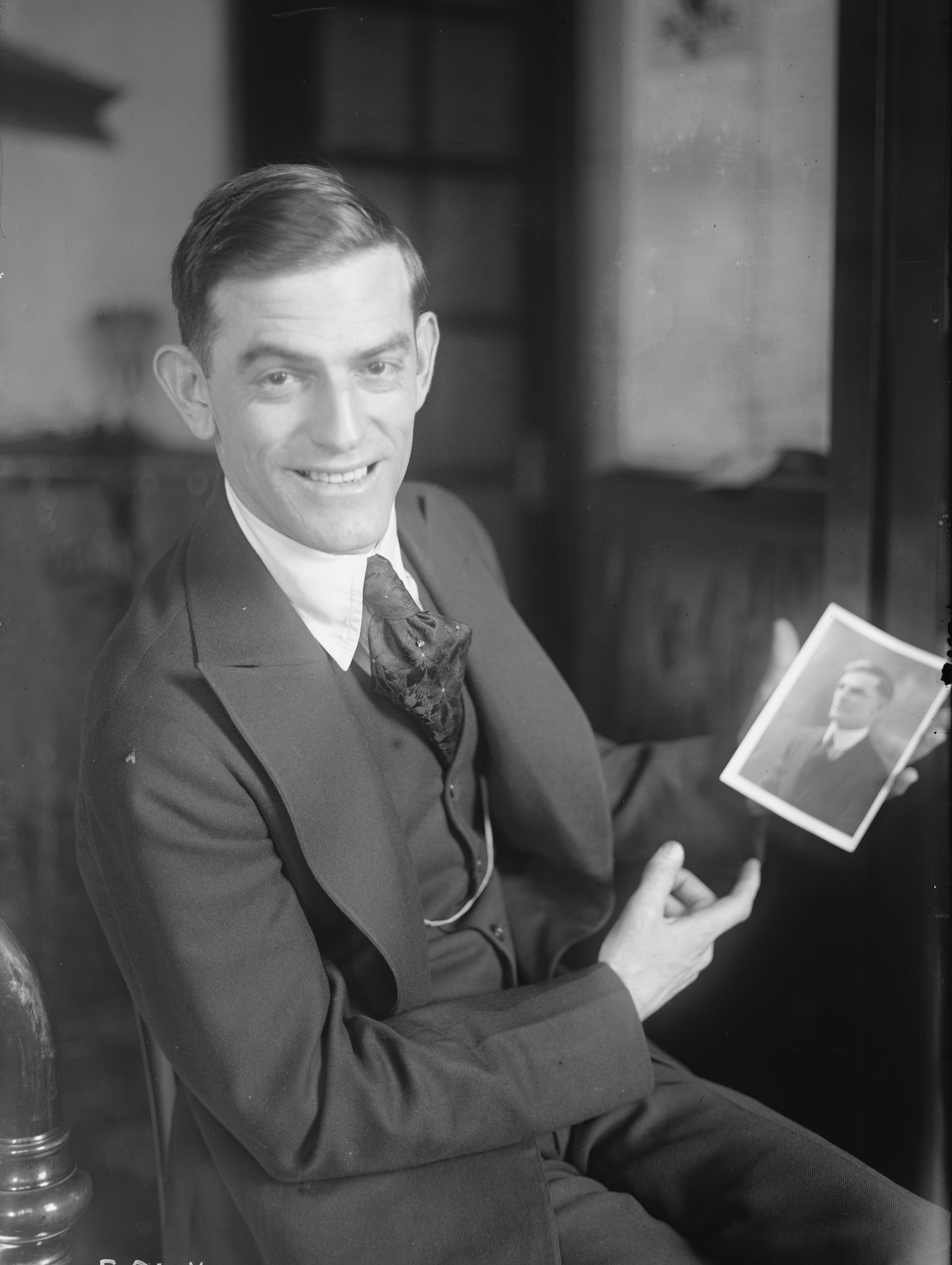

Background information
- Born: Alfred Aloysous Bernard; November 23, 1888; New Orleans, Louisiana
- Died: March 6, 1949 (aged 60) St. Clare's Hospital; Manhattan, New York City, New York
- Genres: Jazz, blues, country, pop
- Occupation: Singer
- Instrument: Vocal
- Years active: 1916—40s
- Labels: Edison, Victor, Okeh, Indestructible, Brunswick

Alfred Aloysous Bernard (November 23, 1888 – March 6, 1949) was an American vaudeville singer, known as "The Boy From Dixie", who was most popular during the 1910s through early 1930s.

== Life ==
Bernard was born in New Orleans, Louisiana. He became a blackface singer in minstrel shows before starting his recording career around 1916, and was one of the first white singers to record blues songs. W. C. Handy credited Bernard with helping his own career by recording a number of his songs, notably "St. Louis Blues". Bernard recorded the song for nine different record labels, the most successful being what Handy called "the sensational Victor recording in which he sang with the Dixieland Jazz Band".

From 1919, he recorded solo for Okeh Records. His songs included one called "Shake, Rattle and Roll", about a dice game, which was wholly unrelated, except in title, to the later rock and roll song. Bernard was sometimes billed as "The Singing Comedian", and was the first American singer to record the song "Frankie and Johnny" in America. (The first known recording was made by Gene Greene and Charley Straight in London.) He also recorded duets with Ernest Hare, in which Bernard took the female singing part, including his biggest hit, "I Want To Hold You In My Arms". He recorded with songwriter J. Russel Robinson as "The Dixie Stars" and, with Robinson, wrote the Bessie Smith feature "Sam Jones Blues". He also co-wrote songs with Jimmy Durante.

Later, he recorded with Vernon Dalhart. In 1925, inspired by Dalhart, he began recording hillbilly songs. His 1930 version of "Hesitation Blues", recorded with the Goofus Five, is considered to predict the western swing style, with an intriguing combination of country and western and Chicago blues feels. Bernard continued to record into the 1940s.

He died on March 6, 1949, in Manhattan, New York.
