= Ralph Marterie =

Italian big-band leader (1914–1978)

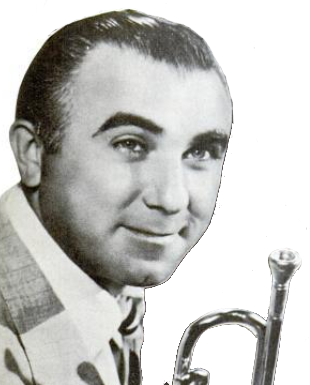
- Marterie in 1964

Background information
- Born: 24 December 1914; Acerra, Italy
- Origin: Chicago, Illinois, US
- Died: 10 October 1978 (aged 63) Dayton, Ohio, US
- Genres: Big band
- Occupations: Bandleader, trumpeter
- Instrument: Trumpet

Ralph Marterie (24 December 1914 – 10 October 1978) was an Italian big-band leader born in Acerra (near Naples), Italy.

== Life and career ==
Marterie first played professionally at age 14 in Chicago. In the 1940s, he played trumpet for various bands. His first job as a bandleader was courtesy of the US Navy during World War II. He was then hired by the ABC Radio network, and the reputation built from these broadcasts led to a recording contract in 1949 with Mercury Records. His highest success in the U.S. charts was a cover of "Skokiaan" in 1954. In 1953 he recorded a version of Bill Haley's "Crazy, Man, Crazy", which is generally regarded as one of the first rock and roll songs. His version of "Crazy, Man, Crazy" reached No. 13 on the Billboard jockey chart and No. 11 on Cashbox in June, 1953. His recordings of "Pretend" and "Caravan" also made the Top 10. "Caravan" sold over one million copies, and was awarded a gold disc. In 1957, he hit No. 25 on the Billboard Hot 100 with "Tricky", and in 1957 he reached No. 10 with "Shish-Kebab". His compositions included "Dancing Trumpet", "Dry Marterie", and "Carla".

Joel Whitburn's pop chart research books say that Marterie's version of "The Song Of Love" peaked at No. 84 for the week ending December 26, 1955. However, Billboard did not put out an issue that week and Marterie never recorded this tune; the listing is in fact a copyright trap, to prevent others from stealing Whitburn's work.

He died on October 10, 1978, in Dayton, Ohio.

== Partial discography ==
=== Albums ===
- Ralph Marterie (1955)
- Music for a Private Eye (1959)
- Marvelous Marterie (1959)
- Dance Band In Town - Esquire Mercury MG20066 Australia
- Dancers Choice (1967)

N.B.: A separately published discography of Ralph Marterie's recordings and of his recording sessions is Ralph Marterie and His Orchestra, by Ross Brethour, Charles Garrod, and Edward Novitsky (Zephyrhills, Fla.: Joyce Record Club Publications, 1992; 65 + 5 leaves).
