= My Side of Your Window =

Studio album by Ralph McTell
- Released: December 1969
- Recorded: August 1969
- Studio: Regent Sound Studios, Tottenham Court Road, London
- Genre: Folk, folk rock, country blues
- Length: 37:27
- Label: Transatlantic
- Producer: Ralph McTell

Ralph McTell chronology
Spiral Staircase (1969)	My Side of Your Window (1969)	Revisited (1970)

My Side of Your Window is the third album released in the UK by British folk musician Ralph McTell, and the first produced by the artist himself. He had left college and had moved into his first house in Putney. "Girl on a Bicycle" was covered by Herman van Veen and was a hit in the Netherlands and West Germany. The song "Michael in the Garden" is one of the earliest to reference autism.

== Track listing ==
All titles by Ralph McTell except where stated.

Side one

1. "Michael in the Garden" - 4:24
2. "Clown" - 3:34
3. "Girl on a Bicycle" (lyrics: Ralph McTell; music: Gary Petersen) - 3:19
4. "Father Forgive Them" - 2:21
5. "All Things Change" - 2:47

Side two

1. "I've Thought About It" - 4:13
2. "Factory Girl" - 4:54
3. "Blues in More Than 12 Bars" - 4:35
4. "Kew Gardens" - 2:15
5. "Wait Until the Snow" - 3:05
6. "Silver Birch and Weeping Willow" - 2:00

== Personnel ==
- Ralph McTell – acoustic guitar, harmonica, piano, vocals
- Bruce Barthol – bass
- "Neil" – flute on "Michael in the Garden" and "Factory Girl"
- Brian "Brock" Brocklehurst – bass
- Gary Petersen – acoustic guitar, piano, organ
- Phil Greenberg – lead guitar on "I've Thought About It" and "Wait Until the Snow"
- John Marshall – drums on "I've Thought About It" and "Wait Until the Snow"
- Clive Palmer – banjo, fiddle on "Blues in More Than 12 Bars"
- Mick Bennett – percussion on "Blues in More Than 12 Bars"
- Folk Weavers – vocal accompaniment on "Kew Gardens"
- Tony Visconti – string arrangements
- Brian Brittain – vocal arrangement on "Kew Gardens"

== Production credits ==
- Producer – Ralph McTell (except track 3, Gus Dudgeon)
- Engineers – Tom Allom and "Adrian" at Regent Sound
- Model used on sleeve design – Peter Thaine
- Liner notes – Robin Denselow

== Awards and accolades ==
- Upon its release, My Side of Your Window was Melody Maker's Folk LP of the Month.
- During his 60th birthday concert at the Royal Festival Hall in November 2004, McTell was presented with a gold disc of My Side of Your Window.

== Release history ==
Country	Date	Label	Format	Catalogue	Notes
United Kingdom	1969	Transatlantic	LP	TRA209	
Australia	1980	Transatlantic/ 7 Records	LP	MLM402	
France		Transatlantic	LP	2933126	
United Kingdom	2007	Transatlantic	CD	TRRCD402	'Expanded Edition' with four bonus tracks - a 1969 single and three taken from Revisited

Many of the tracks on this album also feature in the Spiral Staircase - Classic Songs compilation.

== Track variations ==
The UK 2007 CD release includes four bonus tracks:

12. "Summer Come Along" (1)
13. "Michael in the Garden" (2)
14. "Clown" (2)
15. "Factory Girl" (2)

(1) A single released in the UK in 1969
(2) Re-mixed or re-recorded in 1970 for "Revisited"
