= Stars Fell on Alabama =

Original song composed by Frank Perkins with lyrics by Mitchell Parish

Single by Guy Lombardo and His Royal Canadians
- B-side: "Give Me a Heart to Sing To"
- Published: 1934
- Released: 1934
- Recorded: August 27, 1934
- Genre: Traditional pop
- Length: 3:07
- Label: Decca
- Composer: Frank Perkins
- Lyricist: Mitchell Parish

"Stars Fell on Alabama" is a 1934 jazz standard composed by Frank Perkins with lyrics by Mitchell Parish.

== History ==
The title of the song appears to have been borrowed from the title of the 1934 book of the same name by Carl Carmer. It refers to a spectacular occurrence of the Leonid meteor shower that was observed in Alabama in November 1833, "the night the stars fell." As reported by the Florence Gazette: "[There were] thousands of luminous bodies shooting across the firmament in every direction. There was little wind and not a trace of clouds, and the meteors succeeded each other in quick succession."

One of the earliest popular recordings of "Stars Fell on Alabama" was by the Guy Lombardo Orchestra; Guy Lombardo's brother Carmen performed the vocals. Recorded on August 27, 1934, it was issued by Decca Records as catalog number 104. Richard Himber and His Ritz-Carlton Orchestra (vocal by Joey Nash) also had some success with the song in 1934.

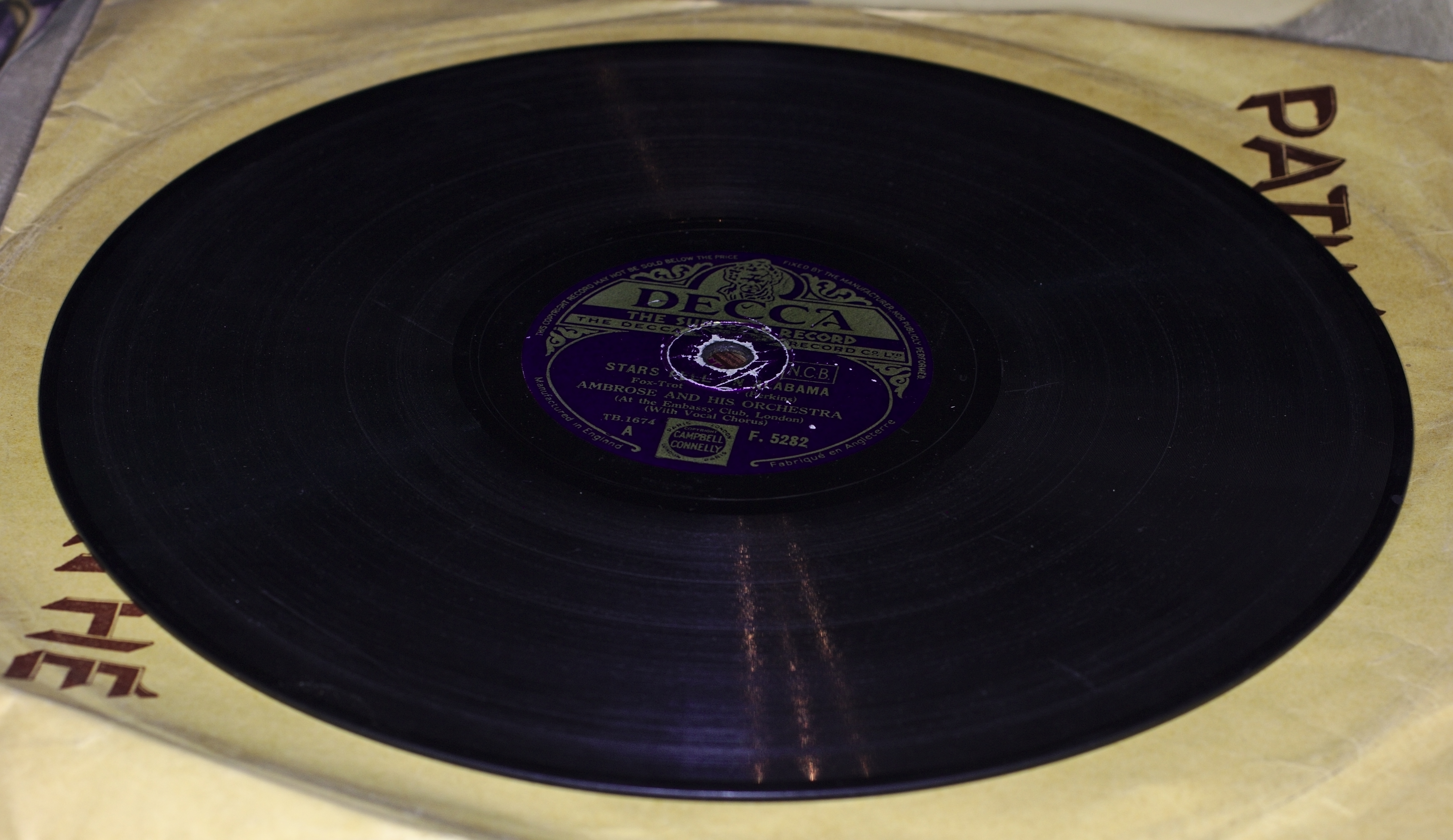
Ambrose and His Orchestra recording of "Stars Fell on Alabama"

The song has been recorded by over 100 artists. Among them are: Al Bowlly; Bing Crosby; Lee Wiley; Ella Fitzgerald; Louis Armstrong; Cannonball Adderley; John Coltrane; Bob Dylan; Jack Teagarden; Jimmy Buffett; Billie Holiday; Anita O'Day; Dean Martin; Kay Starr; Frank Sinatra; Doris Day; Frankie Laine; Art Tatum; Erroll Garner; Don Rondo; Kate Smith; Mel Torme; Mina; Renee Olstead; Ricky Nelson; Stan Getz; Ben Webster; Vera Lynn; Ralph Marterie; Harry Connick Jr.; Sonny Stitt; Lizz Wright.

== 21st-century usage ==
The Marching Southerners of Jacksonville State University in Jacksonville, Alabama, perform an arrangement of the tune by previous band director John T. Finley at every home football game and exhibition. The song has become the unofficial anthem of both the Southerners and Jacksonville State University.

In January 2002, the phrase "Stars Fell on Alabama" was added to Alabama's license plates, and the traditional "Heart of Dixie" slogan was reduced to a smaller size. This design was replaced in early 2009 by another, which depicts the Gulf Coast of Alabama and reads "Sweet Home Alabama".

The song, as performed by Billie Holiday and Louis Armstrong was used in the soundtrack of the 2007 film Constellation, juxtaposing the nostalgic lyrics against the horror of racial violence the movie's protagonist recalls from his childhood.

The song, as performed by Ella Fitzgerald and Louis Armstrong, was also featured in the 2021 movie Outside the Wire.

== Cultural references ==
The 2021 American film Stars Fell on Alabama takes its title from the song.

The American indie-rock band The Mountain Goats wrote a song called "Stars Fell on Alabama" that was inspired by the 1934 song. It is available on the Mountain Goats' 1995 EP, Nine Black Poppies.

== See also ==
- List of 1930s jazz standards
