= Music for a Private Eye =

Studio album by Ralph Marterie
- Released: 1959
- Studio: United Recording Studios, Hollywood, California
- Genre: Big band, Pop, Theme music
- Length: 28:05
- Label: Mercury

Music for a Private Eye is an LP of twelve musical themes from popular television programs of the late 1950s performed by bandleader Ralph Marterie, billed as "Ralph Marterie and his Marlboro men." (Note: Naming the orchestra as the "Marlboro men" may be an allusion to a cigarette brand, since the album cover art depicts Marterie smoking a cigarette.) It capitalized on the growing popularity of television theme songs, focusing on crime and mystery programs.

== Origin and concept ==
Mercury Records' West Coast artist and repertoire director Pete Rugolo collaborated with engineer Bill Putnam to produce Music for a Private Eye, the first Mercury recording at Putnam's United Recording Studios in Hollywood, California. Ralph Marterie led the orchestra in arrangements by Rugolo and veteran jazz musician and music arranger Skip Martin.

== Reception ==
In its June 1960, issue, Hifi/Stereo Review complimented the band's "clean, crisp, frequently hard-swinging interpretations of some of the more staple thematic fare of TV's back alley dramas." The interest level of the album was rated "Approaching saturation point."

Noting that Marterie was known for his big-band dance albums, reviewer Greg Adams concluded that Music for a Private Eye "is a very well-recorded stereo album that makes one wish that Marterie had strayed from his dance band format more often and recorded other thematic albums.

== Reissues ==
In 1963, four years after its initial release, Music for a Private Eye was reissued on Mercury's budget Wing label.

In 2016, Blue Moon Jazz released a CD that combined Music for a Private Eye with Ralph Marterie's 1959 release, Big Band Man.

== Personnel ==
Trumpets

- Ray Linn
- Don Fagerquist
- Joe Triscari
- Uan Rasey

Trombones

- Frank Rosolino
- Bob Fitzpatrick
- Tommy Pederson

Bass Trombone

- George Roberts

Alto Saxes

- Bud Shank
- Paul Horn

Tenor Saxes

- Bob Cooper
- Gus Bivona

Baritone Sax

- Dale Issenhuth

Piano

- Jimmy Rowles

Guitar

- Al Viola

Bass

- Joe Mondragon

Drums

- Irv Kluger

Percussion

- Lou Singer

== Track listing ==
Track	Title	Composers	Length
1	"M Squad"	Count Basie	2:44
2	"Perry Mason"	Fred Steiner	2:56
3	"Richard Diamond"	Pete Rugolo	2:35
4	"Alfred Hitchcock Presents"	Stanley Wilson	2:30
5	"The Thin Man"	Pete Rugolo, Sammy Cahn	2:44
6	"77 Sunset Strip"	Jerry Livingston, Mack David	2:38
7	"Private Eyeball"	Peter Hanson, Pete Rugolo	3:25
8	"The D.A.'s Man"	Frank Comstock	2:57
9	"Riff Blues"	Dave Kahn, Melvin Lenard	3:14
10	"Peter Gunn"	Henry Mancini	2:22
