= Kings and Queens (Anti-Nowhere League album) =

Studio album by Anti-Nowhere League
- Released: 6 December 2005
- Genre: Punk rock
- Length: 45:03
- Label: Captain Oi!
- Producer: Shady

Anti-Nowhere League chronology
Live Animals (2002)	Kings and Queens (2005)	Pig Iron – The Album (2006)

Professional ratings
Review scores
Source	Rating
AllMusic	3.5/5 stars

Kings and Queens is the fourth studio album by English punk rock band Anti-Nowhere League.

== Track listing ==
All songs written by Animal/Anti-Nowhere League unless noted.

1. "Degeneration" – 3:02
2. "Mother's Cunt" – 3:13
3. "Kings and Queens" – 3:33
4. "Just Another Day (In Paradise)" – 3:40
5. "Piggy (The Lesson of Life)" – 4:18
6. "Wet Dream" (Max Romeo) – 2:53
7. "Pump Action" – 4:41
8. "There Is No God" – 3:38
9. "Mission to Mars" – 4:10
10. "Am I Dead?" – 3:55
11. "Dead Heroes" – 3:43
12. "The Punk Prayer" – 4:17

== Personnel ==
- Animal – vocals
- Jez – guitars
- Shady – bass
- PJ – drums
