= Aileen Stanley =

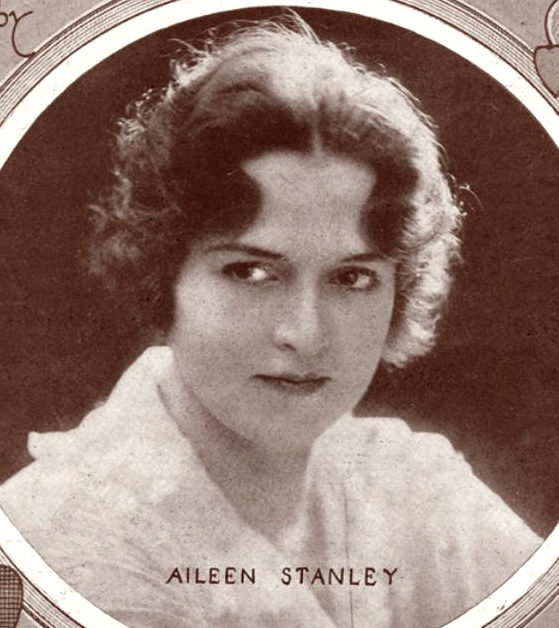
- Stanley in 1919

Background information
- Born: Maude Elsie Aileen Muggeridge; March 21, 1893; Chicago, Illinois
- Died: March 24, 1982 (aged 89) Los Angeles, California
- Occupation: Singer
- Instrument: Vocals

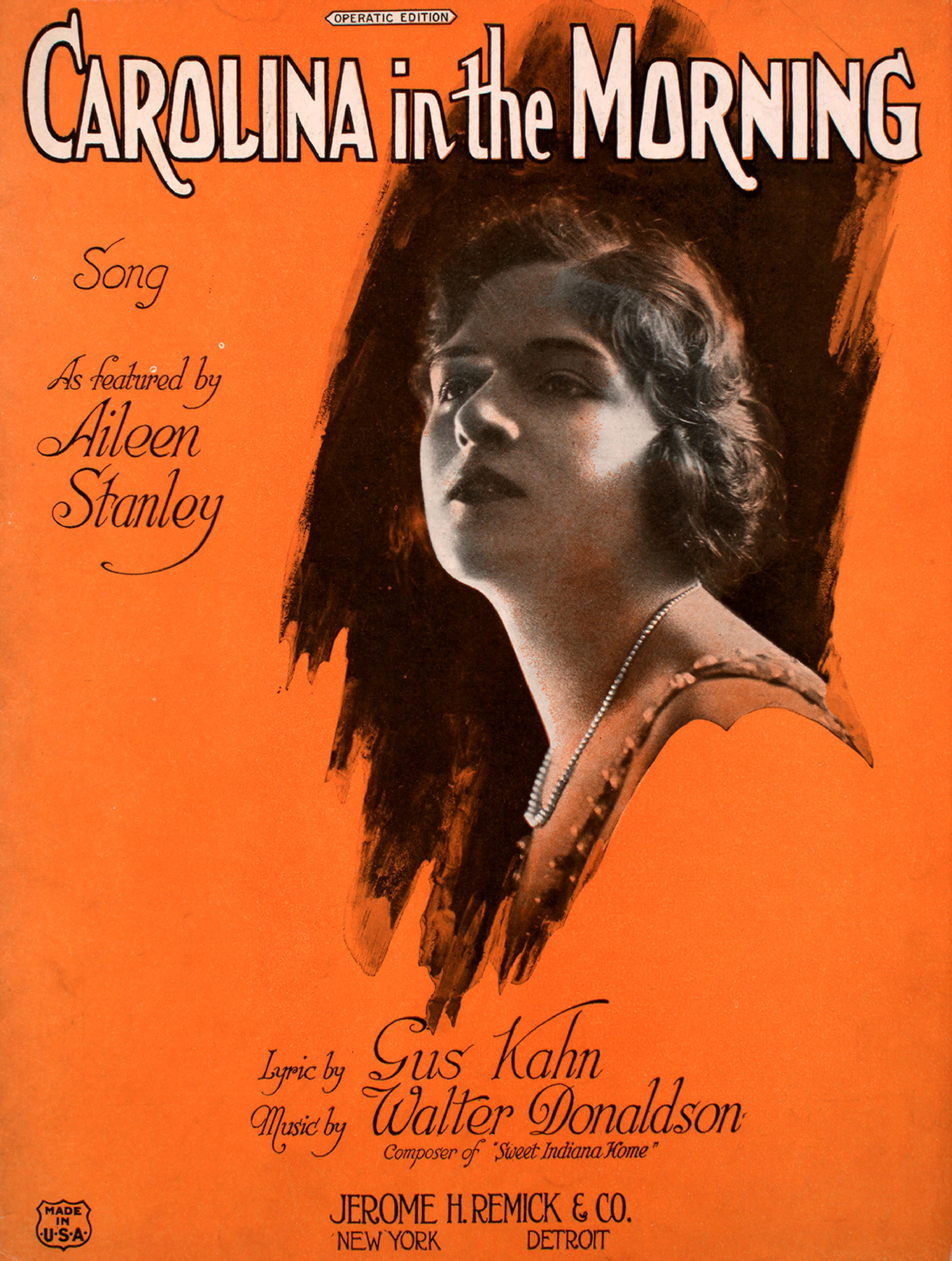
Stanley on the cover of 1922 sheet music for "Carolina in the Morning".

Aileen Stanley, born Maude Elsie Aileen Muggeridge (March 21, 1893 – March 24, 1982), was one of the most popular American singers of the early 1920s.

== Early life ==
Born in Chicago, Illinois, Stanley was the youngest of four children of English parents Robert S. Maggeridge and Maria (née Capewell) Muggeridge who had immigrated from England in 1887. Her sister Elsie Sherrif Muggeridge, died of typhoid in August 1892, passing it on to their father who died of the disease seven months before Aileen's birth. Her widowed mother resided in Chicago along with her surviving siblings, brothers Stanley and Robert Jr.

== Performances and recordings ==
From childhood, she sang and danced in vaudeville with her older brother Stanley as Stanley and Aileen, with the encouragement of their widowed mother. After her brother left the act, Aileen started performing solo, forming her stage name by reversing the name of the old family billing.

Home Again Blues
A 1921 recording of Stanley performing a song by Irving Berlin and Harry Akst

Stanley performed in vaudeville and cabarets. In 1920 she was a hit in New York City in the revue show Silks And Satins and made the first of her numerous recordings the same year. The majority of her records in the '20s were for the Victor Talking Machine Company, but she also recorded with other labels with recording studios in the New York City area, including Edison, Pathe, Okeh, Brunswick, Vocalion, Gennett and others. On some of her early recordings she was accompanied by Rosario Bourdon's Orchestra. Many of her records sold well at the time. According to Joel Whitburn, her most successful early recordings included "My Mammy" (1921), "Sweet Indiana Home" (1922), both written by Walter Donaldson; she also recorded other Walter Donaldson songs including "My Little Bimbo Down on a Bamboo Isle" (1920), "Dixie Highway" (1922), "Carolina in the Morning" (1922), "Back Where The Daffodils Grow" (1924), and "Don't be angry with me" (1926).

Between 1922 and 1924, and again in the late '20s, Victor Records produced a popular series of records pairing Stanley with singer Billy Murray. One of Stanley's 1925 Victor recordings, "When My Sugar Walks Down the Street", in which she shared the vocal with newcomer Gene Austin, helped launch Austin's illustrious career. She recorded J. Russel Robinson and Con Conrad's 1920 jazz standard "Singin' the Blues", released as Victor 18703. She recorded the Paul Whiteman and Fred Rose composition "Flamin' Mamie" on October 5, 1925, and released it as Victor 19828-A accompanied on ukulele by Billy "Uke" Carpenter who provided "jazz effects".

Stanley also recorded for Black Swan Records, a label purportedly devoted only to African-American artists, under the pseudonyms Mamie Jones and Georgia Gorham. Her handling of blues material was similar to that of some of the northern black vaudeville singers of the time. Her stage appearances billed her as "The Phonograph Girl" and "The Girl With The Personality." In later life she was overheard to say that the song "I'll Get By" was written for her.

== Later life ==
Stanley was said to have invested heavily in the stock market and was one of the many who lost most of their life's savings in the Stock Market Crash of 1929. Around 1931 Stanley moved to London, where she made more records for His Master's Voice from 1934 through 1937, and once confided "strictly entre nous" that she unwittingly ended her own romance when she introduced Wallis Simpson to Edward, Prince of Wales, at the home of Thelma, Lady Furness. In her later years she worked as a singing teacher and vocal coach.

She died in March 24, 1982 in Los Angeles, California, three days after her 89th birthady, and was buried (under the name Aileen Stanley Muggeridge) at Forest Lawn Memorial Park, Glendale.
