= League Style =

Studio album by Anti-Nowhere League
- Released: June 2, 2017
- Genre: reggae, rocksteady, punk
- Length: 31:39
- Label: Cleopatra Records

Anti-Nowhere League chronology
The Cage (2016)	League Style (2017)

League Style is a covers album of 10 reggae and rocksteady classics by English punk rock band Anti-Nowhere League. The album was released on Cleopatra Records in June, 2017.

== Track listing ==
No.	Title	Length
1.	"Johnny Too Bad [The Slickers]"	3:08
2.	"Suzanne, Beware of the Devil [Dandy Livingstone]"	3:19
3.	"Singer Man [The Kingstonians]"	3:09
4.	"Come In to My Parlour (Said the Spider to the Fly) [The Bleechers]"	2:57
5.	"Fat Man [Derrick Morgan]"	3:11
6.	"Love of the Common People [Nicky Thomas]"	2:50
7.	"Long Shot Kick de Bucket [The Pioneers]"	2:47
8.	"Big Five [Prince Buster]"	3:47
9.	"Black Pearl [Horace Faith]"	3:17
10.	"Me and My Life [The Tremeloes]"	3:14

== Personnel ==
Animal - Orchestral Percussion, Producer, Vocals
Sammy Carnage - Drums, Percussion
Paul Midcalf - Producer
Shady - Bass
Tommy-H - Guitar, Vocals
