= Frank Perkins (composer) =

American composer

Frank S. Perkins (April 21, 1908 – March 15, 1988) was an American song composer best known for the song "Stars Fell on Alabama" (with lyrics by Mitchell Parish) and his band classic, Fandango. He was born in Salem, Massachusetts and died in Los Angeles, California.

== Early Life ==
Frank S. Perkins was born Frank Sutherland Perkins Jr., to parents Frank Sutherland Perkins Sr. and Ethel Bradlee Manchester, in Salem, Massachusetts on 21 April 1908. On 23 October 1932, he married Rosalie H. Strassburg.

== Career ==
Perkins earned his Ph.B from Brown University in Providence, RI in economics in 1929. Although he was an accomplished pianist, by graduation he could play organ, trombone, saxophone and all the percussion instruments. He studied with noted composer and educator Tibor Serly, who was a student of Zoltán Kodály and also worked with Béla Bartók. Upon graduation, Perkins toured Europe and returned to form his own dance band and become a songwriter. In 1934 he joined Fred Waring and His Pennsylvanians and remained with them as arranger until 1938 when he joined Warner Brothers as a composer and conductor, where he remained for many years.

Decca Records called upon Perkins to record some of his own light compositions on LPs in the 1950s. Some of those he recorded were "Kentucky Trotter," "The Deserted Patio," "Barbara," "Pop-Gun Patrol," "Fandango," "Feliciana," "Escapade," and "The Frustrated Floorwalker". These were all from his first album which was released.

Perkins also worked in film music. He was the composer of the score for The Incredible Mr. Limpet (1964) and conducted orchestras for films, including the 1962 adaptation of Gypsy and the 1963 spring break film Palm Springs Weekend. In the TV genre, he did music scoring and arrangements for 77 Sunset Strip (WB-TV).

== Death ==
Frank Perkins died 15 March 1988 in Los Angeles, California.
