= Spiral Staircase (Ralph McTell album) =

Studio album by Ralph McTell
- Released: 26 May 1969
- Recorded: December 1968
- Studio: Regent Sound Studios, Tottenham Court Road, London
- Genre: Folk, folk rock, country blues
- Length: 35:27
- Label: Transatlantic
- Producer: Gus Dudgeon

Ralph McTell chronology
Eight Frames a Second (1968)	Spiral Staircase (1969)	My Side of Your Window (1969)

Spiral Staircase is British folk musician Ralph McTell's second album. Produced by Gus Dudgeon and released in the UK in 1969, its opening track, "Streets of London", has become McTell's signature tune. "Rizraklaru" is an anagram of "Rural Karzi". The sleeve design was by Peter Thaine, a friend of McTell from Croydon Art College.

== Track listing ==
All titles by Ralph McTell except where stated.

Side one

1. "Streets of London" - 4:06
2. "Mrs Adlam's Angels" - 2:43
3. "Wino and the Mouse" - 0:59
4. "England 1914" - 3:04
5. "Last Train and Ride" - 2:31
6. "The Fairground" - 4:07

Side two

1. "Spiral Staircase" - 3:30
2. "Kind Hearted Woman Blues" (Robert Johnson) - 2:43
3. "Bright and Beautiful Things" - 1:53
4. "Daddy's Here" - 4:22
5. "Rizraklaru (Anag.)" - 1:44
6. "(My) Baby Keeps Staying Out all Night Long" (Buddy Moss) - 1:52
7. "Terminus" - 1:53

== Personnel ==
- Ralph McTell - guitar, vocals

Famous Jug Band

on "Last Train and Ride" and "Spiral Staircase"

- Brian "Brock" Brocklehurst - double bass
- Mick "Henry VIII" Bartlett - jug
- "Whispering Mick" Bennett - washboard
- Peter Berryman - second guitar
- Mike Vickers - orchestral arrangements
- Brian Gascoigne - musical direction

== Production credits ==
- Producer: Gus Dudgeon for Tuesday Productions
- Engineer: Tom Allom at Regent Sound
- Sleeve design: Peter Thaine
- Liner notes: Ben Klein

== Awards and accolades ==
- McTell's song "Streets of London" won the Ivor Novello Award for songwriting in 1974.
- A re-recorded version of "Streets of London" became a world-wide hit single in 1975.
- During his 60th birthday concert at the Royal Festival Hall in November, 2004, McTell was presented with a Gold Disc of Spiral Staircase.

== Release history ==
Country	Date	Label	Format	Catalogue	Notes
United Kingdom	1969	Transatlantic	LP	TRA177	
France	1978	Transatlantic	LP	TRA89554/5	Record 2 of 2-LP set. Record 1 is Eight Frames a Second
Australia	1980	Transatlantic/ 7 Records	LP	MLF227	
Japan	1980	Transatlantic	LP	YS-7057-LA	
Israel		Logo/Transatlantic	LP	TRA177	
Germany	1988	Titan	LP; CD	577/3001-1; 577/3001-2	
United Kingdom	1990	Ariola Express	CD	295945	Released as The Streets of London
United Kingdom	1996	Wooden Hill	CD	HILLCD5	
United Kingdom	2007	Transatlantic	CD	TRRCD401	'Expanded Edition' with four bonus tracks taken from Revisited

Many of the tracks on this album also feature in the Spiral Staircase - Classic Songs compilation.

== Track variations ==
The UK 2007 CD release includes four bonus tracks that were re-mixed or re-recorded in 1970 for "Revisited":

14. "Spiral Staircase"
15. "Last Train and Ride"
16. "The Fairground"
17. "Terminus"
