= Hesitation Blues =

Single by Victor Military Band
- Released: September 15, 1916
- Recorded: September 15, 1916
- Studio: Victor, Camden, New Jersey
- Genre: Blues
- Length: 3:03
- Label: Victor
- Songwriter: Billy Smythe

"Hesitation Blues" is a popular song adapted from a traditional tune. One version was published by Billy Smythe, Scott Middleton, and Art Gillham. Another was published by W.C. Handy as "Hesitating Blues". Because the tune is traditional, many artists have taken credit as writer, frequently adapting the lyrics of one of the two published versions. Adaptations of the lyrics vary widely, though typically the refrain is recognizably consistent. The song is a jug band standard and is also played as blues and sometimes as Western swing. It is cataloged as Roud Folk Song Index No. 11765. Composer William Grant Still arranged a version of the song in 1916 while working with Handy.

== Smythe, Middleton and Gillham version ==
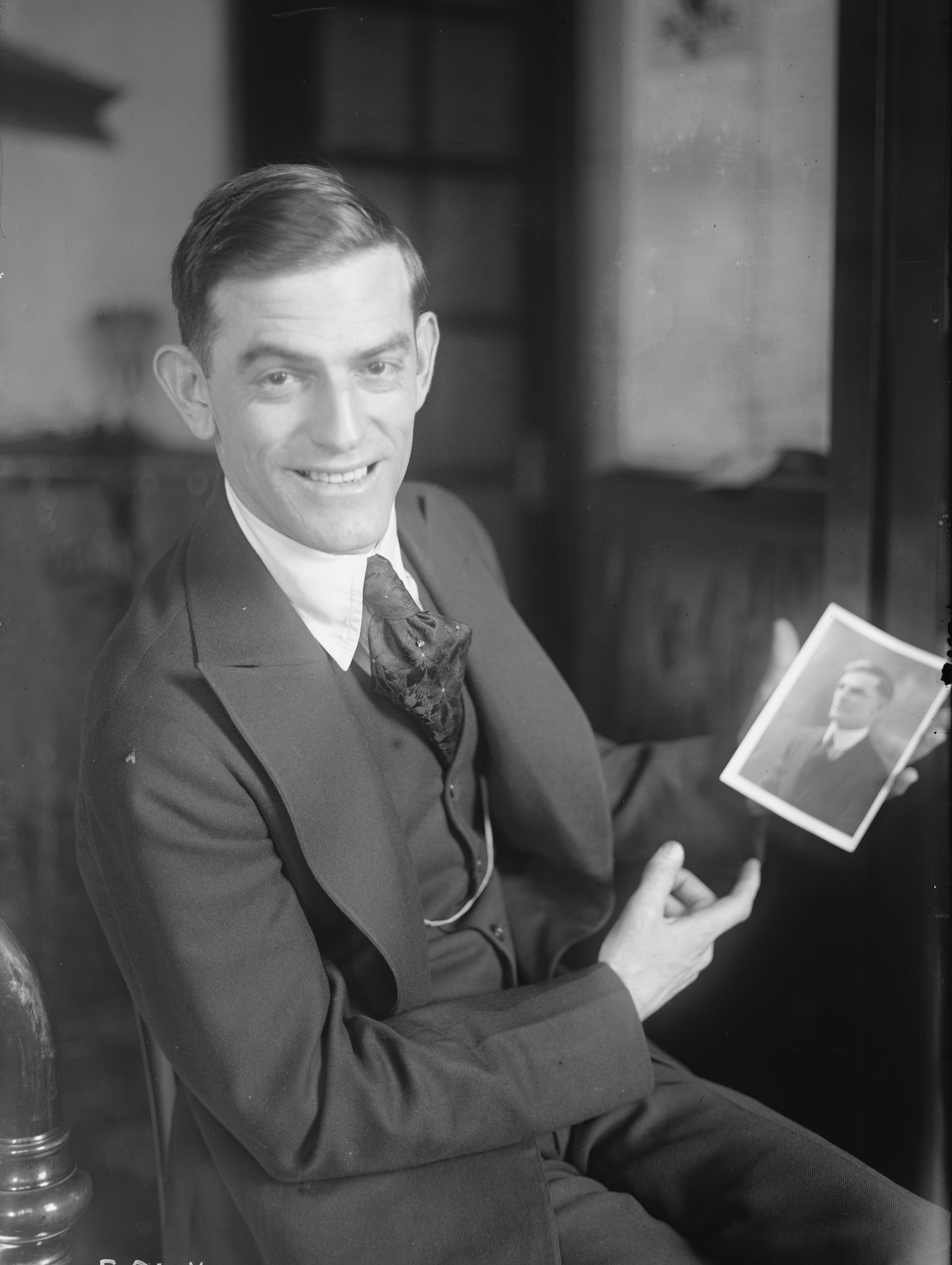
Al Bernard

The three men were involved in the music publishing business in St. Louis, Missouri. About 1914 they joined a band and went to Los Angeles. They passed their traveling time making up verses to a traditional tune. When they returned to St. Louis the trio went their separate ways. Art Gillham remained in St. Louis, Billy Smythe went to Louisville, Smythe's brother-in-law Scott Middleton went to Chicago. In 1915 Billy Smythe published their musings as "Hesitation Blues" but did not credit Gillham.

A dispute over the credits was resolved a few years later when Gillham and Smythe began writing other songs as a team with the sheet music stating "by the writers of Hesitation Blues".

One of the first popular recordings of this song was an instrumental version by the Victor Military Band, with authorship attributed solely to Smythe. It was made on September 15, 1916, at the Victor Talking Machine Company in a Camden, New Jersey factory. This recording stayed in the Victor's catalog as the A-side of Record Number 18163 until January 1923; in February 2009, a video presenting the audio of that recording was added to YouTube.

The song was also recorded for Edison Records in 1919 by Al Bernard and exists as a Blue Amberol cylinder recording and as an Edison Diamond Disc matrix recording. Audio files of this recording are preserved at the Cylinder Digitization and Preservation Project of the University of California Santa Barbara.

Art Gillham performed the song on radio and on February 25, 1925, recorded it for Columbia Records as one of the first electrical recordings (Master 140390, released as Columbia 343-D). The recording has 9 verses and a refrain, including:

How long do I have to wait
Can I get you now
Or must I hesitate?

Ashes to ashes
Dust to dust
I've got a black haired mama
That the rains can't rust.

The song was republished in 1926 giving credit to the three writers. The 1926 publication was a different arrangement with different lyrics added to the 1915 publication.

On February 22, 1935, The San Antonio Light's page 1 column, Around The Plaza told the story of Smythe-Middleton-Gillham's Hesitation Blues. On February 6, 1941, the paper also had an article on page 1 "Getting In Swing Of Hit Tunes" about the writing of Hesitation Blues.

The 1964 version by the Holy Modal Rounders featured the first use of the term "psychedelic" in popular music in the verse "Got my psycho-delic feet, in my psycho-delic shoes, I believe lordy mama got the psycho-delic blues, tell me how long do I have to wait, or can I get you now, or must I hesitay-ay-ay-ate". The original sleeve notes (as reproduced in the CD notes) state "A Charlie Poole hit. Charlie Poole and the North Carolina Ramblers recorded an incredible number of songs that are personal favorites of mine."

== W.C. Handy version ==
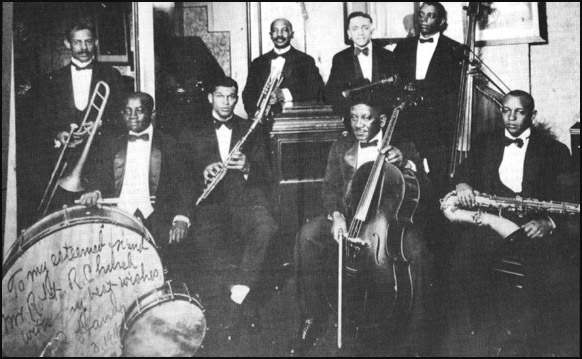
W. C. Handy with his 1918 Memphis orchestra

The same traditional tune was also arranged by W.C. Handy and published in 1915 as "Hesitating Blues". Handy's version shares the melody, but the lyrics are different. His chorus is a variation on the "how long" lyrics in the Smythe, Middleton and Gillham version. The verse, however, is substantially different, telling a story of separated lovers unable to reach each other by phone. There are many recorded versions of the Handy song, including ones by Prince's Band, James Reese Europe's 369th U.S. Infantry "Hell Fighters" Marching Band, Esther Bigeou, Eartha Kitt, Lena Horne, and Louis Armstrong. W. C. Handy, in his Blues Anthology stated the tune was from an old spiritual.

== Use by Langston Hughes in the poem Ask Your Mama ==
At the beginning of his poem sequence Ask Your Mama, Langston Hughes says: "The traditional folk melody of the 'Hesitation Blues' is the leitmotif for this poem." Throughout the poem, Hughes placed musical direction for the poem on the right margin of each page. The direction calls for performance of song several times in the poem sequence. In his biography of Hughes, Arnold Rampersad says the song's chorus, which asks, "How long must I have to wait?" emphasizes Hughes's impatience with the progress of the civil rights movement.

== Sammy Price's version ==
Blues musician Sammy Price remembered hearing a version of "Hesitation Blues" played by an itinerant guitarist that referenced the Lynching of Jesse Washington. Price lived in Waco as a child, possibly at the time of Washington's horrific death.

== Versions recorded by folk song collectors ==
Several versions of the song, which is categorized as number 11765 in the Roud Folk Song Index, were collected from traditional singers by folk song collectors.

Fiddlin' John Carson performed a variant of the song called "Nancy Rowland" in 1923. Robert Winslow Gordon recorded Bascom Lamar Lunsford and a man named John G. Woody singing Hesitation Blues in the 1920s in North Carolina. The recording of Lunsford can be heard online. John Lomax recorded Leadbelly singing a version of the song in 1935 and Smith Casey in 1939; Casey's recording is available on the Library of Congress website. Cas Wallin, one of the Wallin family of North Carolina ballad singers, was filmed in 1982 by Alan Lomax (John Lomax's son) singing a version of the song which differs significantly from the popular versions.

== Renditions by other artists ==
Artists who have recorded the song include:

- Louis Armstrong (W.C.Handy version)
- Asylum Street Spankers
- Al Bernard
- Barney Bigard
- Milton Brown
- Sam Collins
- Reverend Gary Davis
- Duke Ellington
- The Flatlanders
- Jerry Garcia and David Grisman
- Art Gillham (The Whispering Pianist)
- Nat Gonella
- W.C. Handy
- Earl Hines
- Holy Modal Rounders
- Lena Horne
- Hot Tuna
- Jorma Kaukonen
- Jim Jackson
- James P. Johnson
- Janis Joplin
- Kaleidoscope
- Lead Belly
- David Lindley
- Little Brother Montgomery
- Wingy Manone
- Sara Martin
- Ralph McTell
- Dan Melchior
- Jelly Roll Morton
- Willie Nelson with Asleep at the Wheel
- Nitty Gritty Dirt Band
- Old Crow Medicine Show
- Charlie Poole ("If the River Was Whiskey")
- The Radiators
- Patrick Sky
- Terry St.Clair
- Steely Dan with Marian McPartland
- Taj Mahal
- Eva Taylor
- Dave Van Ronk
- Doc and Merle Watson
- Clarence Williams
- Jesse Colin Young (titled "Miss Hesitation")
- Justin Townes Earle

The song was sung twice by the character Putty Nose (played by Murray Kinnell) in the 1931 Warner Bros. film The Public Enemy.
