= Revisited (Ralph McTell album) =

Remix album by Ralph McTell
- Released: November 1970
- Recorded: July 1970
- Genre: Folk, folk rock, country blues
- Length: 36:30
- Label: Transatlantic
- Producer: Gus Dudgeon

Ralph McTell chronology
My Side of Your Window (1969)	Revisited (1970)	You Well-Meaning Brought Me Here (1971)

Revisited is an album of remixed or re-recorded tracks from British folk musician Ralph McTell's albums Spiral Staircase and My Side of Your Window. Produced by Gus Dudgeon, it was originally intended for release in the United States, but in the event was released in the UK. Although the album has never had a CD release in its own right, all tracks are now available on All Things Change: The Transatlantic Anthology on CD.

== Track listing ==
All titles by Ralph McTell.

Side one

1. "Streets of London" - 4:00
2. "Michael in the Garden" - 4;20
3. "Last Train and Ride" - 3:30
4. "Kew Gardens" - 2;15
5. "Fairground" - 3:55

Side two

1. "Spiral Staircase" - 3:10
2. "Factory Girl" - 5:50
3. "Bright and Beautiful Things" - 1:55
4. "Father Forgive Them" - 2:25
5. "Clown" - 3;15
6. "Terminus" - 1:55

== Personnel ==
- Ralph McTell - guitar, vocals
- For other musicians see Spiral Staircase and My Side of Your Window.

== Production credits ==
- Producer: Gus Dudgeon
- Photography - Keith Morris
- Liner notes: Ralph McTell

== Release history ==
Country	Date	Label	Format	Catalogue	Notes
United Kingdom	1970	Transatlantic	LP	TRA227	
Germany	1975	Transatlantic	LP	MLP15.916	Released as "Streets of London"
Germany	1975	Transatlantic	LP	0044.007	Released as "The Original Ralph McTell"
France	1978	Transatlantic	LP	TRA227	
Australia	1980	Transatlantic/ 7 Records	LP	MLM384	

Many of the tracks on this album also feature in the Spiral Staircase - Classic Songs compilation.
