= Punk Singles and Rarities 1981–1984 =

Compilation album by Anti-Nowhere League
- Released: 1 May 2001
- Genre: Punk rock
- Label: Captain Oi

Anti-Nowhere League chronology
Out of Control (2000)	Punk Singles and Rarities 1981–1984 (2001)	Live Animals (2002)

Punk Singles and Rarities 1981–1984 is the sixth compilation album by English punk rock band Anti-Nowhere League. It contains the tracks off recorded from the now out of print album, Apocalypse Punk Tour '81, which had an album of the same name. It also contains a number of single versions of their well-known songs as well as many demo versions.

== Track listing ==
1. We're the League (Apocalypse Punk Tour ‘81)
2. Animal (Apocalypse Punk Tour ‘81)
3. I Hate People (Apocalypse Punk Tour ‘81)
4. Streets of London (Single)
5. So What (Single)
6. Noddy (Demo)
7. I Hate People (Single)
8. Let's Break The Law (Single)
9. Woman (Single)
10. Rocker (Single)
11. World War III (Flexipop single)
12. For You (Single)
13. Ballad of JJ Decay (Single)
14. Out On The Wasteland (Single)
15. We Will Survive (Single)
16. Queen & Country (Single)
17. The Russians Are Coming (Demo)
18. Branded (Demo)
19. Going Down (Demo)
20. Those Summer Days (Demo)
21. Westside (Demo)
22. On The Waterfront (Long Live The League)
