= Gene Austin =

American singer (1900–1972)

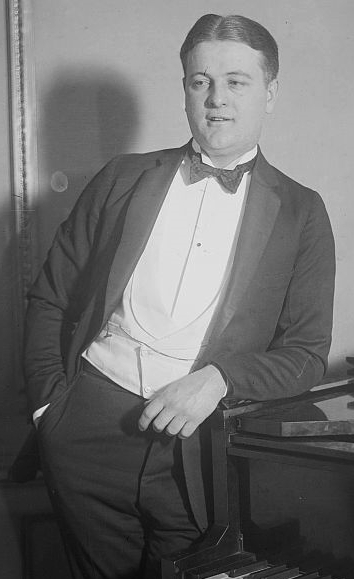

Background information
- Born: Lemeul Eugene Lucas; June 24, 1900; Gainesville, Texas, U.S.
- Died: January 24, 1972 (aged 71) Palm Springs, California, U.S.
- Genres: Vaudeville, old-time
- Occupations: Singer, songwriter
- Years active: 1924–1952
- Labels: RCA Victor
- Spouses: Kathryn Arnold Austin (m. 1924–1929); Agnes Antelline Austin (m. 1933–1940); Doris Sherrell Austin (m. 1940–1946); LouCeil Hudson Austin (m. 1949–1966); Gigi Theodorea Austin (m. 1966)

Lemeul Eugene Lucas (June 24, 1900 – January 24, 1972), better known by his stage name Gene Austin, was an American singer and songwriter, one of the early "crooners". His recording of "My Blue Heaven" sold over 5 million copies and was for a while the largest selling record of all time. His 1920s compositions "When My Sugar Walks Down the Street" and "The Lonesome Road" became pop and jazz standards.

== Early life ==
Austin was born as Lemeul Eugene Lucas in Gainesville, Texas (north of Dallas), to Nova Lucas and the former Serena Belle Harrell. He took the name Gene Austin from his stepfather Jim Austin, a blacksmith. Austin grew up in Minden, Louisiana. In Minden, he learned to play piano and guitar. He ran away from home at 15. He attended a vaudeville act in Houston, Texas, where the audience was allowed to come to the stage and sing. On a dare from his friends, Austin took the stage and sang for the first time since singing as a Southern Baptist choir boy. The audience response was overwhelming, and the vaudeville company immediately offered him a billed spot on its ticket.

Austin joined the U.S. Army at the age of 15 in hopes of being dispatched to Europe to fight in World War I. He was stationed in New Orleans, where he played the piano at night in the city's notorious vice district. His familiarity with horses from helping his stepfather in his blacksmithing business prompted the Army to assign Austin to the cavalry and send him to Mexico with Major General John J. Pershing's Pancho Villa Expedition, for which he was awarded the Mexican Service Medal. He later served in France in World War I.

On returning to the United States in 1919, Austin settled in Baltimore, Maryland, where he briefly studied dentistry and law. Soon, he was playing piano and singing in local taverns. He started writing songs and formed a vaudeville act with Roy Bergere, with whom he wrote "How Come You Do Me Like You Do". The act ended when Bergere married. Austin worked briefly in a club owned by Lou Clayton, who later was a part of the famous vaudeville team Clayton, Jackson and Durante.

== Career ==
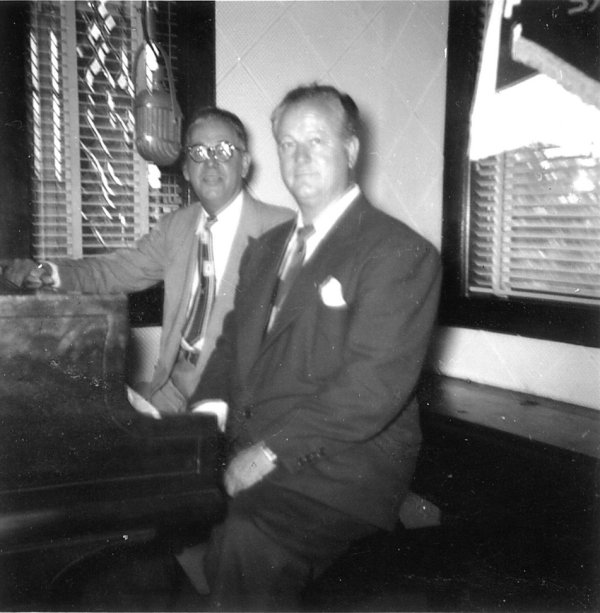
Austin, guest of Art Gillham at WQXI Atlanta (September 1953)

Gene Austin was an influential early crooner whose records in their day enjoyed record sales and the highest circulation. He made a substantial number of influential recordings, including a string of best-sellers. Some of his best sellers include "The Lonesome Road", "My Blue Heaven", "Riding Around in the Rain", "Tonight You Belong to Me", and "Ramona". At the peak of his career, Austin demanded that only the pianist Fats Waller could provide accompaniment on his records.

By 1924, Austin was in New York's Tin Pan Alley. His first recording surreptitiously was providing the vocals for the Tennessee guitarist George Reneau, whose own voice did not record well.

In 1925, Austin recorded his popular song "When My Sugar Walks Down the Street" for the Victor Talking Machine Company in a duet with Aileen Stanley. Nathaniel Shilkret, in his autobiography, describes the events leading to the recording. He followed it that year with hits, including "Yearning (Just for You)" and "Yes Sir, That's My Baby with Billy "Uke" Carpenter. In the next decade with Victor, Austin sold over 80 million records.

His 1926 "Bye Bye Blackbird" was in the year's top 20 records. George A. Whiting and Walter Donaldson's "My Blue Heaven" was charted during 1928 for 26 weeks, stayed at No. 1 for 13, and sold over 5 million copies. It was awarded a gold disc by the RIAA. Until Bing Crosby's "White Christmas" replaced it, it was the largest selling record of all time. In the hope of duplicating the success, this was quickly followed by "Ramona", an L. Wolfe Gilbert-Mabel Wayne song created for the 1927 romantic adventure film Ramona with Dolores del Río. It charted for 17 weeks, was No. 1 for eight and easily topped 1 million in sales. It also gained gold disc status. His next success, Joe Burke and Benny Davis' 1928 song "Carolina Moon" was on the charts 14 weeks, with seven weeks at No. 1. The depression struck during Austin's hit-making years, severely damaged the recording industry and, with it, Austin's recording career.

Despite never learning to read or notate music, Austin composed over 100 songs. His compositions included "When My Sugar Walks Down the Street", recorded by Duke Ellington, Nat King Cole, The Ink Spots, Hot Lips Page, Johnny Mathis, The Four Freshmen, Red Nichols' Five Pennies, Ella Fitzgerald, Sy Oliver, and the Wolverines Orchestra; "How Come You Do Me Like You Do?", recorded by Fletcher Henderson and His Orchestra, Gene Rodemich, Marion Harris, George Wettling, and Erroll Garner; "The Lonesome Road", written with Nat Shilkret, recorded by Bing Crosby, Fats Waller, Louis Armstrong, Eddy Arnold, Don Gibson, Mildred Bailey, Les Paul, Judy Garland, Frankie Valli and the Four Seasons, Sammy Davis Jr., Dick Dale, The Fendermen, Frank Sinatra, Chet Atkins, Bobby Darin, Duane Eddy, Paul Robeson, Jerry Vale, Muggsy Spanier, Tommy Dorsey, Benny Goodman, Jimmie Lunceford, Frankie Laine and Ted Lewis; "Riding Around in the Rain", written with Carmen Lombardo and "The Voice of the Southland".

Austin formed a trio with bassist Johnny Candido and guitarist Otto Heimel. They called themselves Gene Austin and his Candy and Coco. They had a radio series from 1932 to 1934.

Colonel Tom Parker, who later became Elvis Presley's manager, gradually worked his way into the music business when he began to promote Gene Austin in 1938.

In the 1940s, Austin and his singers toured the U.S. in a 14-truck caravan with its own power plant and cook house. He stopped in Minden, Louisiana, and performed there in a popular tent show on the grounds of the local Coca-Cola plant owned by the Hunter family.

=== Film appearances ===
Offered to work in Hollywood at the height of his career as the "Voice of the Southland", Austin appeared in several films, including Belle of the Nineties, Klondike Annie, Sadie McKee – all 1934 releases, Songs and Saddles (1938), and My Little Chickadee (1940) at the request of his friend Mae West.

== Musical style ==
With the advent of electrical recording, Austin, along with Rudy Vallee, Art Gillham, Nick Lucas, Johnny Marvin and Cliff Edwards, adopted an intimate, radio-friendly, close-miked style that took over from the full-voiced, stage-friendly style of tenor vocals popularized by such singers as Henry Burr and Billy Murray. Such later crooners as Bing Crosby, Frank Sinatra, and Russ Columbo all credited Austin with creating the musical genre that began their careers. Austin also influenced his friend Jimmie Rodgers (who considered Austin his "idol") and as such contributed to the birth of country music.

== Honors ==
In 1978, Austin's 1928 Victor recording of "My Blue Heaven" (Victor 20964A), was inducted into the Grammy Hall of Fame. In 2005, his 1926 Victor recording of "Bye Bye Blackbird" (Victor 20044) was inducted into the Grammy Hall of Fame as well.

== Personal life ==
Austin married his first wife, Kathryn Arnold, a dancer, in 1924 and divorced her in 1929. They had a child, Ann, born in 1928. Austin married his second wife, Agnes Antelline, in 1933, and their daughter Charlotte Austin was born that same year. He and Agnes divorced in 1940. Austin then married actress Doris Sherrell in 1940, and divorced her in 1946. He married wife number four, LouCeil Hudson, a singer, in 1949, and the marriage lasted until 1966. Austin married Gigi Theodorea in 1967, his fifth and final marriage.

Country music singer Tommy Overstreet, who had his biggest hits in the 1970s, is Austin's third cousin.

Austin retired to Palm Springs, California in the late 1950s and was active in civic boards there until 1970. Income from his record sales allowed him to live comfortably the rest of his life.

In 1962, he campaigned unsuccessfully for the Democratic nomination for governor of Nevada.

He died in Palm Springs of lung cancer and was interred in the Forest Lawn Memorial Park Cemetery in Glendale, California.

== Gallery ==
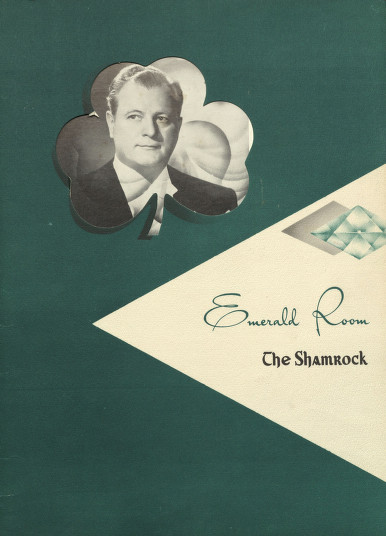
Shamrock Hotel/Emerald Room Program/Menu featuring Gene Austin (circa 1952, Houston, Texas)

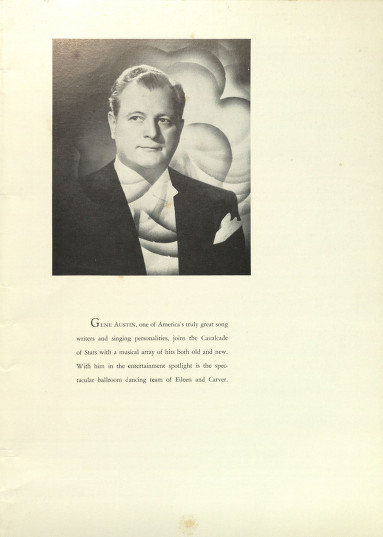
Shamrock Hotel/Emerald Room Program/Menu featuring Gene Austin (circa 1952, Houston, Texas)

== Bibliography ==
- "Gene Austin", A Dictionary of Louisiana Biography, Vol. 1 (1988), p. 25
- John Agan, "The Voice of the Southland", North Louisiana History, Vol. 28, No. 4 (Fall 1997), 23–37
- Congressional Quarterly's Guide to U.S. Elections, Nevada gubernatorial primaries
- The Rise of the Crooners, Michael Pitts and Frank Hoffman; Scarecrow Press, 2002
