= Spiral Staircase – Classic Songs =

Spiral Staircase - Classic Songs

Compilation album by Ralph McTell
- Released: 1997
- Recorded: 1967–1970
- Genre: Folk, folk rock, country blues
- Label: Snapper
- Producer: Gus Dudgeon, Ralph McTell

Spiral Staircase – Classic Songs is a double CD compilation of tracks from Ralph McTell's early Transatlantic LPs Eight Frames a Second, Spiral Staircase, My Side of Your Window and Revisited. It was released in 1997.

== Track listing ==
All titles by Ralph McTell except where stated.

Disc 1

1. "Summer Come Along"
2. "Terminus"
3. "Michael in the Garden" [Version 2]
4. "Nanna's Song"
5. "Last Train and Ride"
6. "Wino and the Mouse"
7. "Clown"
8. "Willoughby's Farm"
9. "The Mermaid and the Seagull"
10. "Eight Frames a Second"
11. "Wait Until the Snow"
12. "Hesitation Blues" (Trad. arr. Ralph McTell)
13. "England 1914"
14. "Girl on a Bicycle" (Ralph McTell/Gary Petersen)
15. "Mrs. Adlam's Angels"
16. "Granny Takes a Trip" (Boyer/Beard)
17. "Blind Blake's Rag" (Trad. arr. Ralph McTell)
18. "Spiral Staircase"
19. "Father Forgive Them" [Version 1]
20. "All Things Change"
21. "Streets of London"

Disc 2

1. "Factory Girl" [Version 2]
2. "Bright and Beautiful Things"
3. "Father Forgive Them" [Version 2]
4. "Michael in the Garden" [Version 1]
5. "I've Thought About It"
6. "Blues in More Than 12 Bars"
7. "Rizraklaru (Anag)"
8. "Factory Girl" [Version 1]
9. "Silver Birch and Weeping Willow"
10. "Louise"
11. "Too Tight Drag" (Blind Blake)
12. "Kew Gardens"
13. "Fairground"
14. "Sleepy Time Blues"
15. "Daddy's Here"
16. "Morning Dew" (Bonnie Dobson arr. Fred Neil)
17. "I'm Sorry - I Must Leave"

Note. Titles marked '[Version 1]' are from the original albums; those marked '[Version 2]' are re-mixes from Revisited.

== Musical credits ==
- Ralph McTell - guitar, vocals
- For other musicians see Eight Frames a Second, Spiral Staircase and My Side of Your Window.

== Production credits ==
- See the articles on the contributing albums Eight Frames a Second, Spiral Staircase, My Side of Your Window and Revisited.
