= The Perfect Crime (Anti-Nowhere League album) =

Studio album by Anti-Nowhere League
- Released: 11 May 1987
- Genre: New wave; punk rock
- Length: 37:53
- Label: Griffin Records
- Producer: Nick Kulmer; Animal, Chris Exall; Magoo Clive Blake; Winston Mark Gilham; Gilly

Anti-Nowhere League chronology
Long Live the League (1985)	The Perfect Crime (1987)	Live and Loud (1989)

Professional ratings
Review scores
Source	Rating
AllMusic	1.5/5 stars

The Perfect Crime is the second studio album by English punk rock band Anti-Nowhere League. The sound of the band changed a great deal from their debut album, We Are...The League. The Perfect Crime features a blend of 1980s rock with a light punk sound. It was the last studio album by the band before they broke up for several years.

== Track listing ==
All songs written by Animal/Magoo.

1. "Crime"
2. "Atomic Harvest"
3. "On the Waterfront"
4. "Branded"
5. "(I Don't Believe) This Is My England"
6. "Johannesburg"
7. "The Shining"
8. "Working for the Company"
9. "System"
10. "The Curtain"

== Personnel ==
- Animal − vocals
- Magoo − rhythm guitar
- Gilly (Mark Gilham) − lead guitar
- Winston Blake − bass
- JB − drums
