= We Are...The League =

Studio album by Anti-Nowhere League
- Released: 1982
- Genre: Punk rock, oi!
- Length: 31:31
- Label: WXYZ
- Producer: "An Aurable Production"

Anti-Nowhere League chronology
We Are...The League (1982)	Live in Yugoslavia (1983)

We Are...The League is the debut album by English punk rock band Anti-Nowhere League.

== Reception ==
Professional ratings
Review scores
Source	Rating
AllMusic	4.5/5 stars
The Philadelphia Inquirer	4/5 stars

From contemporary reviews, Ken Tucker of The Philadelphia Inquirer gave the album a four star out of five rating stating that it was "the most viscous mean-spirited, gratuitously violent punk band to come down the pike in a long time." and stated the album was for "mature adults, this is the best hard-core punk record England has yielded since the Sex Pistols era. Every song features a slamming, inescapable beat to match the freely flung obscenities." Carol Clerk of Melody Maker and Garry Bushell of Sounds noted that the music was hard to take seriously due to how over the top it was. Clerk found that "It's so far over the top it's in orbit, uttering the unutterable at every opportunity, yelling a defiant "eff off" at everybody and everything. It's so extreme, it's impossible to take offence. Take the League seriously and the joke's on you, mate." while Bushell found that "this just ain't the sort of music to lend itself to sensitive in-depth philosophical probings." and that "the only way the album can be appreciated is to knock back half a litre of Jacks, head-butt the budgie and crank up the volume till you acquire a backing track of petrified screams from neighbours and innocent passers-by."

Clerk wrote that "There's nothing specially original about the music, but it's presented like nothing you've ever heard before." Bushell also noted that "Initial impressions of sameness hide spicey thematic variations (violence, perversion, and general obnoxiousness) and lotsa strong no-frills addictiveness. Much of this rubbish is catchier than an iron hook in a bar-room brawl." Clerk noted the negative traits of the album being "Nowhere Man", whose backing vocals were too calm and bassy when they should be "snarling" and that the new version of "Let's Break the Law" as it had seemed "seems to have lost the fierce edge of the seven inch rendition."

== Track listing ==
All tracks are written by Nick Culmer and Chris Exall, except where noted

We Are...The League track listing
No.	Title	Writer(s)	Length
1.	"We Are the League"		2:40
2.	"Animal"		2:39
3.	"Woman"		2:57
4.	"Can't Stand Rock 'n' Roll"		1:57
5.	"(We Will Not) Remember You"		2:00
6.	"Snowman"		3:00
7.	"Streets of London"	Ralph McTell	3:16
8.	"I Hate...People"		2:21
9.	"Reck-a-Nowhere"		2:27
10.	"World War III"		2:41
11.	"Nowhere Man"		2:27
12.	"Let's Break the Law"		3:06
Total length:			31:31

2001 re-release bonus tracks
No.	Title	Writer(s)	Length
13.	"So What?"	Culmer, Exall, Clive Blake	3:08
14.	"I Hate...People (single version)"
15.	"Let's Break the Law (single version)"
16.	"Woman (single version)"
17.	"Rocker"	Culmer, Exall, Blake
18.	"Animal (uncensored original version)"
19.	"For You"		3:08
20.	"Ballad of J.J. Decay"		5:19

== Personnel ==
- Animal – vocals
- Magoo – guitars
- Winston – bass
- P.J. – drums
