= Live in Yugoslavia =

Live album by Anti-Nowhere League
- Released: 1983
- Genre: Punk rock
- Length: 46:36
- Label: ID Records
- Producer: Anti-Nowhere League

Anti-Nowhere League chronology
We Are...The League (1982)	Live in Yugoslavia (1983)	Long Live the League (1985)

Professional ratings
Review scores
Source	Rating
Allmusic	3/5 stars

Live in Yugoslavia is a live album by the English punk rock band Anti-Nowhere League. It was recorded in Moša Pijade Hall in Zagreb, Yugoslavia on 24 April 1983 and released and pressed later in the same year in England on I.D Records. The CD was anecdotally edited to remove foul language and crude references to the recently deceased former president Tito, but nothing was edited or removed on the original 1983 vinyl release.

The album was recorded live using the mobile equipment of sound engineer Nenad Zubak and his crew. The original of the recording was on a radio tape and was later additionally mixed by Ted Sharp and the band members at the Rockfield Studios.

The LP cover was designed by Crunchic and Sirc Nirbag and the art featured an artist's impression of the Flag of the Socialist Federal Republic of Yugoslavia with its map on fire. The back cover contained photographs of the members taken by Goranka Matic on the streets of Zagreb.

== Track listing ==
All songs written by the Anti-Nowhere League except where noted.

1. "Let's Break the Law"
2. "Streets of London" (Ralph McTell)
3. "Let the Country Feed You"
4. "We Will Survive"
5. "Snowman"
6. "I Hate People"
7. "For You"
8. "Going Down"
9. "Woman"
10. "Can't Stand Rock 'n' Roll"
11. "So What?"
12. "Reck-A-Nowhere"
13. "Paint It, Black" (Mick Jagger, Keith Richards)
14. "We Are the League"

== See also ==
- Punk rock in Yugoslavia
