= Scum (Anti-Nowhere League album) =

Studio album by Anti-Nowhere League
- Released: 17 November 1997
- Genre: Punk rock
- Length: 37:53
- Label: Impact
- Producer: Animal/Magoo

Anti-Nowhere League chronology
The Perfect Crime (1987)	Scum (1997)	Out of Control (2000)

Professional ratings
Review scores
Source	Rating
AllMusic	link

Scum is the third studio album by English punk rock band the Anti-Nowhere League and the first album of new material released since the original band's breakup ten years previously. A new lineup is featured, with only lead singer Animal and guitarist Magoo remaining from the band which recorded the much-criticised The Perfect Crime LP in 1987. The album also marks a return to the band's "classic" punk sound.

== Track listing ==
All songs written by Animal/Magoo, except where noted.

1. "Fucked Up and Wasted"
2. "Chocolate Soldiers"
3. "Get Ready"
4. "Suicide...Have You Tried?"
5. "Pig Iron"
6. "Scum"
7. "Burn 'Em All"
8. "Gypsies, Tramps and Thieves" (Robert Stone)
9. "How Does It Feel?"
10. "The Great Unwashed"
11. "...Long Live Punk..."

== Personnel ==
- Animal – vocals
- Magoo – rhythm guitar
- Beef – lead guitar
- JJ Kaos – bass
- Revvin Taylor – drums
