= Streets of London (song) =

Song by Ralph McTell

from the album Spiral Staircase
- Released: 1969 Spiral Staircase; 1970 Revisited; 1971 You Well-Meaning Brought Me Here (US release); 1974 UK single 1975 Streets... 2017 CD single
- Recorded: 1968, 1970, 1971, 1974, 2017
- Songwriter: Ralph McTell

"Streets of London" is a folk song by Ralph McTell, who first recorded it for his 1969 album Spiral Staircase. It was not released in the United Kingdom as a single until 1974. McTell himself noted that there were 212 known recorded versions of the song. The song was re-released, on 4 December 2017, featuring McTell with Annie Lennox as a charity single for CRISIS, the Homelessness Charity. Roger Whittaker also recorded a well received version in 1971.

== Background ==
The song was inspired by McTell's experiences busking and hitchhiking throughout Europe, especially in Paris and the individual stories are taken from Parisians. McTell was originally going to call the song "Streets of Paris"— but eventually London was chosen, because he realised he was singing about London; also, there was another song called "The Poor People of Paris".

McTell's song contrasts the common problems of everyday people with those of the homeless, lonely, elderly, ignored and forgotten members of society. In an interview on Radio 5 with Danny Baker on 16 July 2016, McTell said that the market he referred to in the song was Surrey Street Market in Croydon.

== Composition ==
McTell left the song off his debut album, Eight Frames a Second, since he regarded it as too depressing, and did not record it until persuaded by his producer, Gus Dudgeon, for his second album in 1969. A re-recorded version charted in the Netherlands in April 1972, notching up to No. 9 the next month. McTell re-recorded it for the UK single release in 1974. McTell played the song in a fingerpicking style with an AABA song structure.

Similarities of the composition have been noted (along with many others) with certain patterns found in Pachelbel's Canon.

== Commercial performance ==
The song was McTell's greatest commercial success, reaching No. 2 in the UK Singles Chart, at one point selling 90,000 copies a day and winning him the 1974 Ivor Novello Award for Best Song Musically and Lyrically and a Silver disc for record sales.

== Other versions ==
=== John Allan Cameron version ===
In 1972, John Allan Cameron released a version on his album Lord Of The Dance. The single reached number 4 on Canada's AC/MOR charts, May 27, 1972.

=== Anti-Nowhere League version ===
Punk band Anti-Nowhere League recorded a version of the song on their debut album in 1982. Ned Raggett of AllMusic referred to it as "the undisputed highlight" of the album in a retrospective review.

=== Sinéad O'Connor version ===
In 1994, Irish singer Sinéad O'Connor recorded a version of the song which appeared on the CD EP for "Thank You for Hearing Me". Contemporary trade magazine Music & Media called the recording an "A-side worthy cover" of McTell's song. In a 2026 interview with Guitar Player, McTell said O'Connor's recording was one of the versions of the song he really liked, describing it as a "lovely take" and saying that it captured the perspective of someone who genuinely cared.

=== 2017 Crisis single ===
In 2017, McTell re-recorded the song with Annie Lennox (who sings the song's second verse, and some support vocals close to the end) and clients of UK national charity Crisis (who sing the chorus vocal behind McTell.) The performance was issued as a charity single, with proceeds to help homeless people. This was to mark the 50th anniversary of both the song and of the Crisis charity. Though the track peaked at #92 on the UK charts, the CD single of this release was Number 1 in the Christmas 2017 Official Physical Singles Chart (for CD sales).

=== 2020 updated verse ===
In March 2020 McTell agreed to write another verse to the song, inspired by the COVID-19 pandemic.
