= Anti-Nowhere League =

English punk rock band

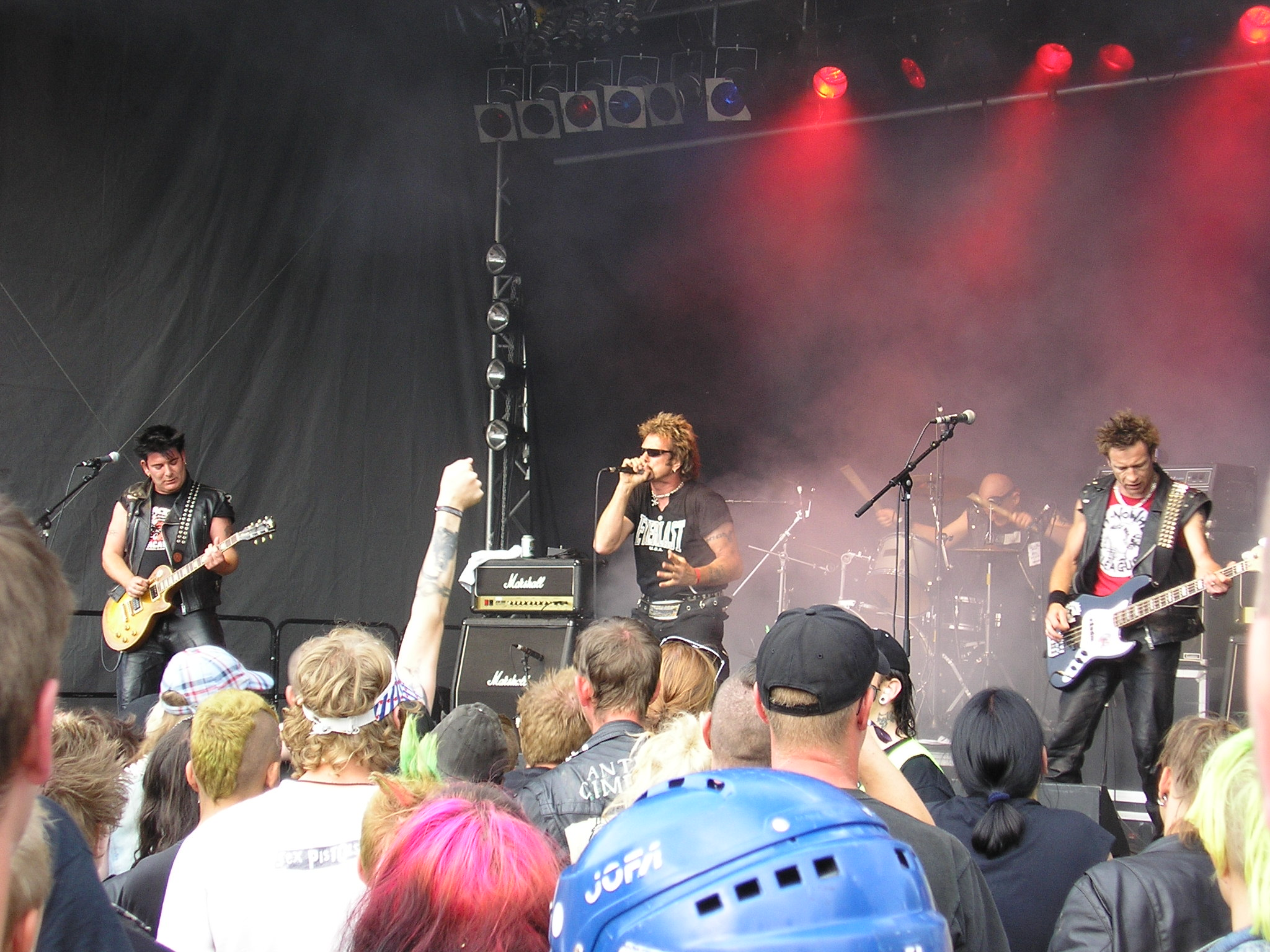
- Anti-Nowhere League performing in 2007

Background information
- Origin: Royal Tunbridge Wells, Kent, England
- Genres: Punk rock; street punk; hardcore punk
- Years active: 1979–1989, 1992–present
- Labels: Impact; Captain Oi!; Cleopatra; Nowhere
- Members: Animal; Tommy H Dave Nato; Biff

Anti-Nowhere League are an English punk rock band, formed in 1979 in Royal Tunbridge Wells, Kent, by lead singer Animal (Nick Culmer), guitarist Magoo (Chris Exall), Bones (Tony Shaw) on drums and Chris Elvy on bass.

== History ==
=== Early days ===
The band first played at the 1980 Chaos Show at St Mark's Hall, Royal Tunbridge Wells on 31 March 1980. They signed to John Curd's record label WXYZ Records in the same year.

November 1981 saw the release of their first single, a cover version of Ralph McTell's "Streets of London". The single peaked at No. 48 in the UK Singles Chart and spent five weeks in the listings. The profanity-laden B-side of the single, "So What", later became the group's anthem. Copies of this single were seized from indie distributor Pinnacle by the Metropolitan Police's Obscene Publication Squad shortly after release.

In 1982, the band released their debut album, We Are...The League. It reached No. 24 in the UK Albums Chart, and spent eleven weeks in the chart. In the same year, the band went to Yugoslavia to record a live album, Live In Yugoslavia. This album spent one week at No. 88 in the UK Albums Chart.

=== 1984 to 1989 ===
In 1984, PJ left the band, and they became musically inactive. 1985 saw Michael Bettell join on drums, followed in 1986 by JB (Jonathan Birch). During this time they signed for GWR Records, and recorded The Perfect Crime album.

In 1987, Anti-Nowhere League disbanded. However, there was a belated 'farewell' show at the Victoria Hall in Tunbridge Wells, in 1989, which was recorded and can be heard on their live album Live Animals.

=== Comeback ===
In 1992, Animal was told by JB that Metallica wanted him to guest at Wembley Arena, when they did their cover version of "So What". Animal puts it thus on ANL's website: "As I waited on the edge of the stage waiting to go on it suddenly dawned on me I was just about to stand in front of 10,000 punters who didn't know me from Adam and sing a song that I couldn't fucking remember; all that kept running through my head was RUN you silly old fucker!". However, after the 25 October show, Mark joined that year on lead guitar, and 1993–1995 was spent playing gigs in the small venues the band had started out in.

Michael Bettell died in September 2003, aged 41, from a brain tumour.

In 1996, they signed up with Impact Records and recorded their next EP Pig Iron. Beef also joined the band. Further personnel changes occurred in 1997 when Winston left the band to be replaced by Jon Jon, and the recording of the album Scum. Winston Blake returned to his former occupation of a roofer and leadworker and lives in East Sussex. Danny joined on drums in 1998, and the album Out of Control was released a year later in 1999.

In 2001, Magoo quit the band.

=== 2002–present ===
Jon Jon, Beef and Danny left the band, to be replaced by PJ (original drummer), Jez on guitar and Shady on bass. This line-up released the band's fifth studio album, Kings and Queens in 2005, which was released on the Captain Oi! record label. However, there were arguments over the omission of two songs from that album, "The Day The World Turned Gay" and "The Adventures Of Peter Vile". Lawyers for Captain Oi! refused to sanction the release of these two songs because of fear of litigation, so Nick (Animal) eventually relented and let the album be released with the two disputed songs omitted.

In 2006, the band set up their own independent record label, Nowhere Records; with Pig Iron - The Album being the first release in August 2006. The album included the two songs omitted from the Kings and Queens album, as well as "Landlord", taken from the Out Of Control album. The same year, the Anti-Nowhere League undertook a twenty nine date UK tour, and PJ left the band after the Glasgow gig in October 2006. His replacement was Dave Hazlewood (Nato), from the small Kent town of Cranbrook, who had filled in before on tours. On 8 November 2006, the ANL began a three-week tour of Australia and New Zealand. On 26 October, the band joined Angelic Upstarts, Sham 69 and The Damned for the academy in the UK 2006: 30th Anniversary of Punk gig at London's Shepherd's Bush Empire.

The Anti-Nowhere League supported Rancid at their Leeds gig on 8 November 2008. In December 2008, Jez was replaced on lead guitar by Johhny Skullknuckles. The League continued to tour and record, and now promote their new songs with videos. After a mini European tour in late spring 2009, they embarked on an American tour in June and July 2009, before appearing at the Punk Rebellion festival in Blackpool. After touring Germany and the Netherlands in early May 2010, the band and Johhny Skullknuckles parted company and Tommy H (Tom Hunt) was drafted in on guitar.

In 2011, the band recorded the "This Is War" single, and accompanying video, which was followed by a tour with the UK Subs supporting Motörhead on a number of UK dates. At the 2012 Download Festival, the band appeared on the Pepsi Max stage hours before Metallica filled the main stage as headliners.

During the later months of 2015 writing began for the album The Cage, the first fresh studio album since Rampton. During this time, drummer Dave 'Nato' Hazlewood left the band. 'The Cage album saw another slight change in direction, with a heavier, and more direct sound. It was released by Cleopatra Records in 2016.

2017 saw the band record and release a collection of classic reggae covers under the title League Style, Loosen Up Vol I.

Former bassist Steve "Barnzy" Barnes died from injuries sustained in a motorcycle collision on September 20, 2026.

== Members ==
- Nick "Animal" Culmer – vocals (1980–present)
- Tom "Tommy-H" Hunt – guitars (2010–present)
- Matt "Biff" Lucas – bass (2024–present)
- Dave "Nato" Hazlewood – drums (2006–2015, occasional appearances 2023–present)

=== Former members ===
- Barnzy – bass (2017–2023; died 2026)
- Chris "Magoo" Exall – guitars (1980–2001)
- Tony "Bones" Shaw – drums (1980–1981)
- Chris "Baggy" Elvey – bass (1980–1981)
- Clive "Winston" Blake – bass (1981–1997)
- Hooper
- Djahanshah "P.J." Aghssa – drums (1981–1983, 2002–2006)
- Mark "Gilly" Gilham – guitars (1983–1989)
- Jonathan "JB" Birch – drums (1983–1989, one-off show in 2022)
- Vinny "Revvin Kev" "Revvin Taylor" Taylor – drums (1991–1998)
- Keith "Beef" Hillyer – guitars (1996–2002)
- John "Jon Jon" "JJ Kaos" Pearce – bass (1997–2002)
- Danny Webster– drums (1998–2002)
- James "Jez" Jezard – guitars (2002–2008)
- Johhny Skullknuckles – guitars (2008–2010)
- Shady – bass (2002–2017)
- Sammy "Carnage" Carne – drums (2015–2022)
- Jamie Oliver – drums (2023–2025)

== Discography ==
- We Are…The League (1982)
- The Perfect Crime (1987)
- Scum (1997)
- Kings and Queens (2005)
- The Road to Rampton (2007)
- We Are...The League...Un-cut (2014)
- The Cage (2016)
- League Style (2017)
