= So What? (Anti-Nowhere League song) =

Single by Anti-Nowhere League
- A-side: "Streets of London"
- Released: 1981
- Genre: Oi!; hardcore punk
- Length: 3:08
- Label: WXYZ
- Songwriters: Nick "Animal" Culmer; Chris "Magoo" Exall; Clive "Winston" Blake

"So What?" is a song by English punk rock band Anti-Nowhere League. It first appeared as the B-side of the band's debut 7" single "Streets of London", in 1981. It was added as a bonus track to We Are...The League's re-release in 2001.

== History and controversy ==
The song was written, according to the band, after sitting in a pub one night and hearing two men try to outdo each other with stories of past experiences. The song is therefore a retort to people who tell embellished stories to make themselves appear better than the person they are in conversation with.

The obscene lyrical content of the song caused the British police to seize all copies of the single from the band's distributors under the Obscene Publications Act 1959 and remove all copies from sale. It was the first pop record in Britain to be found in contravention of the obscenity laws. The word "fuck" appeared in the first line of the song and the word “cunt” is used four times throughout the song. The song has subsequently been appended to various CD reissues of the We Are... The League album and has become an anthem for the band. Lyrics in the song include references to bestiality ("I fucked a sheep / I fucked a goat") and acquiring sexually transmitted diseases ("I've had crabs, I've had lice / I've had the clap").

== Metallica cover ==
The song has been covered by Metallica and released as a B-side to the "Sad but True" single and later included on the Garage Inc. album; it is also a bonus track on the Asian version of Metallica. "So What?" would go on to become an in-concert standard for the band. During the 1996 MTV Europe Music Awards, the band performed the song immediately after "Last Caress" instead of "King Nothing", which was taken from their then-new album Load. Their entire performance was aired live and uncensored. The Canadian rock band Sum 41 often used the Metallica version as outro music played over the sound system at their concerts until their disbandment in 2025.
