= Bing Crosby discography =

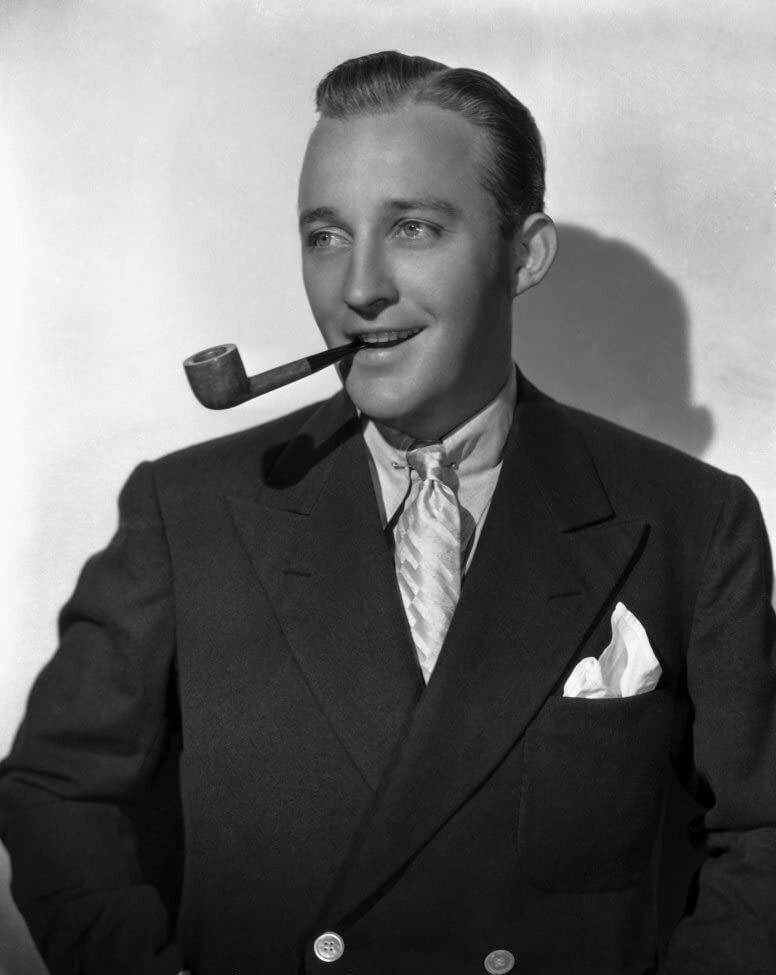
- Crosby, c. 1940s
- Studio albums: 71
- Extended plays: 27
- Soundtrack albums: 7
- Live albums: 2
- Compilation albums: 307
- Singles: 409
- Christmas albums: 86
- 78 rpm albums: 57
- LP albums: 105
- Decca albums: 100
- Total albums: 397

American singer Bing Crosby released 71 studio albums (and 45 solo studio albums), 307 compilation albums and 409 singles over the course of his career. Crosby is one of the world's best-selling music artists, having sold more than 200 million records as of 1960 according to different sources his sales could be 300 million, 500 million records, tapes, compact discs and digital downloads globally. Guinness World Records recognizes "White Christmas" as the best-selling single of all time, selling 50 million copies globally.

Crosby was an influence on multimedia stars that followed, including Elvis Presley. Musically, Crosby set the benchmark for the intimate "easy listening" genre that influenced future male artists including Frank Sinatra, Dean Martin, Perry Como, and Dick Haymes. He first started recording in 1926 with Don Clark and his Hotel Biltmore Orchestra, when he sang the vocal refrain on "I've Got the Girl". He joined the Paul Whiteman Orchestra in 1927 which led to his first screen appearance as a member of the trio The Rhythm Boys in King of Jazz.

He released his first album containing compilations in 1939, and his first studio album Ballad for Americans, (which contained no re-issued singles) in 1940. His final album Beautiful Memories was recorded in 1976; however, material recorded before his death was issued posthumously in 1977 as the album Seasons. Crosby recorded with numerous artists, including Al Jolson, his fellow film stars Judy Garland and Bob Hope, and The Andrews Sisters.

== Lifetime albums (studio and compilations) ==
Year	Album	Label	Peak chart position	Certifications
1939	Music of Hawaii (compilation)	Decca	—	
1939	Victor Herbert Melodies, Vol. 1 (recorded in 1938)	Decca	—	
1939	Patriotic Songs for Children (compilation)	Decca	—	
1939	Cowboy Songs (Bing Crosby's first solo album - compilation)	Decca	—	
1939	Victor Herbert Melodies, Vol. 2	Decca	—	
1939	George Gershwin Songs, Vol. 1 (compilation)	Decca	—	
1940	Ballad for Americans (Bing Crosby's first solo studio album)	Decca	—	
1940	Favorite Hawaiian Songs	Decca	—	
1940	Decca Presents an Album of Christmas Music (compilation)	Decca	—	
1940	Star Dust	Decca	10 (reissue)	
1941	Hawaii Calls	Decca	—	
1941	Small Fry	Decca	—	
1941	Crosbyana (compilation)	Decca	—	
1941	Under Western Skies	Decca	—	
1942	Song Hits from Holiday Inn	Decca	—	
1942	A Collection Of Early Recordings Volume 1 (compilation)	Brunswick	—	
1944	Crosby Classics (compilation)	Columbia Masterworks	—	
1944	A Collection Of Early Recordings Volume 2 (compilation)	Brunswick	—	
1945	Merry Christmas (box set versions of 45's were available by the '50s)	Decca	1	RIAA: Gold
1945	Selections from Going My Way	Decca	1	
1946	Selections from The Bells of St. Mary's (recorded in 1945)	Decca	1	
1946	Don't Fence Me In (w/ The Andrews Sisters)	Decca	2	
1946	The Happy Prince	Decca	—	
1946	Selections from Road to Utopia (recorded in 1944)	Decca	—	
1946	Bing Crosby - Stephen Foster	Decca	—	
1946	What We So Proudly Hail	Decca	—	
1946	Favorite Hawaiian Songs, Vol. One	Decca	—	
1946	Favorite Hawaiian Songs, Vol. Two	Decca	—	
1946	Blue Skies (w/ Fred Astaire and Irving Berlin)	Decca	2	
1946	Bing Crosby - Jerome Kern	Decca	—	
1947	St. Patrick's Day	Decca	1	
1947	Bing Crosby – Victor Herbert	Decca	—	
1947	Cowboy Songs, Vol. One	Decca	—	
1947	Selections from Welcome Stranger (recorded in 1946)	Decca	—	
1947	Our Common Heritage	Decca	—	
1947	El Bingo - Latin American Favorites	Decca	—	
1947	The Small One	Decca	—	
1947	The Man Without a Country	Decca	—	
1947	Drifting and Dreaming	Decca	—	
1947	St. Valentine's Day (compilation)	Decca	8	
1948	Blue of the Night	Decca	—	
1948	Selections from Showboat	Decca	—	
1948	Bing Crosby – The Emperor Waltz (recorded in 1947)	Decca	2	
1948	Bing Crosby Sings with Al Jolson, Bob Hope, Dick Haymes and the Andrews Sisters (compilation)	Decca	—	
1948	Selections from Road to Rio	Decca	—	
1948	Bing Crosby Sings with Judy Garland, Mary Martin, Johnny Mercer	Decca	—	
1948	Bing Crosby Sings with Lionel Hampton, Eddie Heywood, Louis Jordan (compilation)	Decca	—	
1948	Bing Crosby Sings the Song Hits from Broadway Shows (compilation)	Decca	—	
1948	Cowboy Songs, Vol. Two	Decca	—	
1948	Auld Lang Syne	Decca	—	
1949	Bing Crosby Sings Cole Porter Songs	Decca	—	
1949	A Connecticut Yankee In King Arthur's Court (recorded in 1947)	Decca	5	
1949	Bing Crosby Sings Songs by George Gershwin	Decca	—	
1949	South Pacific	Decca	8	
1949	Christmas Greetings	Decca	4	
1949	Ichabod – The Legend of Sleepy Hollow	Decca	—	
1949	Crosby Classics Vol. 2 (compilation)	Columbia	8	
1950	Top o' the Morning / Emperor Waltz (compilation)	Decca	—	
1950	Songs from Mr. Music (w/ Dorothy Kirsten and The Andrews Sisters - LP and also 45/78 RPM box set versions of this compilation album)	Decca	10	
1950	Go West Young Man (w/ The Andrews Sisters LP and also a 78 rpm box set version of this album)	Decca	—	
1950	A Crosby Christmas (EP) (w/ Gary Crosby, Phillip Crosby, Dennis Crosby and Lindsay Crosby)	Decca	—	
1950	Bing Crosby, Collectors' Classics - Vols. 1-8 (set of 8 LPs - also 45 rpm box sets for each of the eight compilation albums)	Decca	—	
1950	Cowboy Songs Volume 3 (compilation - 45 rpm box set)	Decca	—	
1950	When Irish Eyes Are Smiling (LP and EP versions, as well as a 45 rpm box set)	Decca	—	
1950	Bing Crosby Sings the Song Hits from... (LP and also a 45 rpm box set version)	Decca	—	
1950	Al Jolson And Bing Crosby (LP and also a 45 rpm box set)	Decca	—	
1950	Down Memory Lane With Bing Crosby Vol. I (LP and also a 45 rpm box set version of this compilation album)	Decca	—	
1951	Way Back Home (LP and also 45/78 RPM box set versions of this album)	Decca	—	
1951	Bing and the Dixieland Bands (compilation)	Decca	—	
1951	Yours Is My Heart Alone (LP and also 45/78 RPM box set versions of this album)	Decca	—	
1951	Country Style (LP and also a 45 rpm box set version of this album)	Decca	—	
1951	Beloved Hymns (recorded in 1949 - LP and also 45/78 RPM box set versions of this album)	Decca	—	
1951	Bing Crosby Sings Victor Herbert Songs (compilation)	Decca	—	
1951	Down Memory Lane With Bing Crosby Vol. II (LP and also a 45 rpm box set version of this compilation album)	Decca	—	
1952	Bing and Connee (w/ Connee Boswell - LP and also a 45 rpm box set version of this album)	Decca	—	
1952	Themes and Songs from The Quiet Man (w/ Victor Young)	Decca	—	
1952	Selections from the Paramount Picture "Just for You" (w/ Jane Wyman and The Andrews Sisters - LP and also a 45 rpm box set version of this album)	Decca	—	
1952	Road to Bali (w/ Bob Hope and Peggy Lee - LP and also 45/78 RPM box set versions of this album)	Decca	—	
1952	A Treasury Of Immortal Performances "Columbo, Crosby" (w/ Russ Columbo) (EP)	RCA Victor	—	
1953	Le Bing: Song Hits of Paris	Decca	—	
1953	Gary Crosby and Friend (EP) (w/ Gary Crosby)	Decca	—	
1953	Bing Crosby and The Andrews Sisters (EP) (w/ The Andrews Sisters)	Decca	—	
1953	Bing Crosby Sings Song Hits from The King and I (EP)	Decca	—	
1953	Bing Sings the Hits	Decca	—	
1953	Bing Sings the Hits Vol 1 (EP)	Decca	—	
1953	Vol 1 (EP)	Decca	—	
1954	Some Fine Old Chestnuts (recorded in 1953)	Decca	—	
1954	Selections from Irving Berlin's White Christmas (w/ Peggy Lee and Danny Kaye)	Decca	2	
1954	Bing: A Musical Autobiography (17xEP and 5xLP box set compilations)	Decca	9	
1954	The Country Girl / Little Boy Lost (recorded in 1953–1954)	Decca	—	
1954	The Country Girl (EP)	Decca	—	
1954	Little Boy Lost (EP)	Decca	—	
1954	Bing Sings the Hits Vol 2 (EP)	Decca	—	
1955	Merry Christmas (later version of 1945 78 rpm album, later renamed White Christmas in 1995)	Decca	—	RIAA: 4× Platinum; BPI: Silver (Note: The 1974 rerelease titled "White Christmas")
1955	Young Bing Crosby (compilation)	RCA Victor, "X"	—	
1955	Old Masters (box set compilation - 3xLP and 9xEP)	Decca	—	
1955	Some Fine Old Chestnuts Volume 1 (w/ the Buddy Cole Trio) (EP)	Decca	—	
1955	Some Fine Old Chestnuts Volume 2 (w/ the Buddy Cole Trio) (EP)	Decca	—	
1956	Shillelaghs and Shamrocks (compilation)	Decca	—	
1956	Home on the Range (compilation)	Decca	—	
1956	Blue Hawaii (compilation)	Decca	—	
1956	High Tor (w/ Julie Andrews and Everett Sloane) (recorded in 1955)	Decca	—	
1956	A Christmas Sing with Bing around the World (recorded in 1955)	Decca	—	
1956	Anything Goes (w/ Donald O'Connor, Mitzi Gaynor and Zizi Jeanmaire)	Decca	—	
1956	Songs I Wish I Had Sung the First Time Around (EP)	Decca	—	
1956	Bing Sings Whilst Bregman Swings	Verve	—	
1956	High Society (w/ Frank Sinatra, Grace Kelly, and Louis Armstrong)	Capitol	5	
1956	Songs I Wish I Had Sung the First Time Around (Part 1) (EP)	Decca	—	
1956	Songs I Wish I Had Sung the First Time Around (Part 2) (EP)	Decca	—	
1956	Songs I Wish I Had Sung the First Time Around (Part 3) (EP)	Decca	—	
1956	Bing Sings Whilst Bregman Swings (EP)	Verve	—	
1957	Bing with a Beat	RCA Victor	—	
1957	A Christmas Story - An Axe, An Apple and a Buckskin Jacket	Golden Records	—	
1957	Ali Baba and the Forty Thieves	Golden Records	—	
1957	New Tricks (recorded in 1955–1956)	Decca	—	
1957	The Bible Story of Christmas	World Library Publications	—	
1957	Christmas Time (EP)	Decca	—	
1957	Once Over Lightly (EP)	Decca	—	
1957	New Tricks... (w/ the Buddy Cole Trio) (EP)	Decca	—	
1957	Bing with a Beat Vol. I (w/ Bob Scobey's Frisco Jazz Band) (EP)	RCA Victor	—	
1957	Bing with a Beat Vol. II (w/ Bob Scobey's Frisco Jazz Band) (EP)	RCA Victor	—	
1957	Bing with a Beat Vol. III (w/ Bob Scobey's Frisco Jazz Band) (EP)	RCA Victor	—	
1957	Bing Crosby Sings New Christmas Songs (EP)	Golden Records	—	
1957	Paris Holiday (w/ Bob Hope) (EP)	United Artists Records	—	
1958	Never Be Afraid (recorded in 1957)	Golden Records	—	
1958	Jack B. Nimble – A Mother Goose Fantasy (recorded in 1957)	Golden Records	—	
1958	Fancy Meeting You Here (w/ Rosemary Clooney)	RCA Victor	—	
1958	Around the World with Bing!	Decca	—	
1958	Bing in Paris	Decca	—	
1958	That Christmas Feeling (incorporates the 1949 78 rpm album Christmas Greetings, and 5 later recordings)	Decca	—	
1958	In a Little Spanish Town	Decca	—	
1958	Crosby Classics (compilation)	Harmony	—	
1958	A Musical Autobiography of Bing Crosby 1927 - 1934 (compilation)	Decca	—	
1958	Bing Crosby Sings (compilation)	Vocalion	—	
1958	Fancy Meeting You Here (w/ Rosemary Clooney) (EP)	RCA Victor	—	
1959	Bing’s Buddies and Beaus	Brunswick	—	
1959	Say One for Me (w/ Debbie Reynolds and Robert Wagner)	Columbia	—	
1959	A Musical Autobiography of Bing Crosby 1941-1944 (compilation)	Decca	—	
1960	How the West Was Won (w/ Rosemary Clooney, recorded in 1959)	RCA Victor	—	
1960	Join Bing and Sing Along (recorded in 1959)	Warner Bros. Records / RCA Victor	7 (UK)	
1960	Join Bing and Sing Along (Volume 4) (EP)	Warner Bros. Records	—	
1960	Bing & Satchmo (w/ Louis Armstrong)	MGM Records	—	
1960	Songs of Christmas	Decca	—	
1961	101 Gang Songs (recorded in 1960)	Warner Bros. Records	—	
1961	El Señor Bing (recorded in 1960)	MGM Records	—	
1961	My Golden Favorites	Decca	—	
1961	A Musical Autobiography of Bing Crosby 1944-1947 (compilation)	Decca	—	
1962	The Road to Hong Kong	Liberty	—	
1962	Bing's Hollywood vols.1-15 (set of 15 albums)	Decca	—	
1962	On the Happy Side	Warner Bros. Records	—	
1962	I Wish You a Merry Christmas	Warner Bros. Records	—	
1962	Holiday in Europe (recorded in 1961)	Decca	—	
1962	Only Forever (compilation)	Decca	—	
1962	Easy to Remember (compilation)	Decca	—	
1962	Accentuate the Positive (compilation)	Decca	—	
1962	Sunshine Cake (compilation)	Decca	—	
1962	Swinging on a Star (compilation)	Decca	—	
1962	Pocket Full of Dreams (compilation)	Decca	—	
1962	Pennies from Heaven (compilation)	Decca	—	
1962	But Beautiful (compilation)	Decca	—	
1962	General Electric Wishes You a Merry Christmas (EP)	Decca	—	
1963	Guys and Dolls	Reprise	—	
1963	Finian's Rainbow	Reprise	—	
1963	South Pacific	Reprise	—	
1964	Return to Paradise Islands (recorded in 1963)	Reprise	—	
1964	America, I Hear You Singing (w/ Frank Sinatra and Fred Waring)	Reprise	—	
1964	Robin and the 7 Hoods (w/ Frank Sinatra, Dean Martin, and Sammy Davis, Jr.)	Reprise	—	
1964	12 Songs of Christmas (w/ Frank Sinatra and Fred Waring)	Reprise	—	
1964	The Very Best of Bing Crosby (compilation)	MGM Records	—	
1965	Bing Crosby Sings the Great Country Hits (recorded in 1963)	Capitol	—	
1965	That Travelin' Two-Beat (w/ Rosemary Clooney, recorded in 1964)	Capitol	—	
1965	Bing Crosby (compilation)	Metro Records	—	
1966	The Summit (w/ Dean Martin, Frank Sinatra and Sammy Davis Jr.)	Reprise	—	
1966	Bing Crosby's Treasury – The Songs I Love (6-LP box set - reissued in 1968)	Longines Symphonette Society	—	
1966	Bing Crosby's All Time Hit Parade (compilation)	Longines Symphonette Society	—	
1966	Bing Sings for Children (compilation)	Vocalion	—	
1967	Bing Crosby and The Columbus Boychoir Sing Family Christmas Favorites (w/ The Columbus Boychoir)	Decca	—	
1967	Bing Crosby in Hollywood (1930-1934) (compilation)	Columbia	—	
1968	Thoroughly Modern Bing	Pickwick	—	
1968	Paul Whiteman and His Orchestra Featuring Bing Crosby (compilation)	Columbia	—	
1969	Hey Jude / Hey Bing! (recorded in 1968)	Amos	—	
1970	Goldilocks	Disneyland	—	
1971	A Time to Be Jolly	Daybreak	—	
1971	The Best of Bing	MCA Records	—	BPI: Silver (Note: The 1974 rerelease)
1972	Bing 'n' Basie (w/ Count Basie)	Daybreak	—	
1972	Rhythm on the Range	Coral	—	
1972	I’ll Sing You a Song of the Islands	Coral	—	
1972	Wrap Your Troubles In Dreams (compilation)	RCA Victor	—	
1973	The Very Best of Bing (mail-order 7-LP box set)	World Records (UK)	—	BPI: Gold (Note: The 1975 rerelease)
1973	Soft Lights and Sweet Music (compilation)	Biograph	—	
1973	Rare Early Recordings 1929-1933 (compilation)	Capitol Records	—	
1973	Christmas with... Bing Crosby / Nat King Cole / Dean Martin (Christmas compilation)	Pelican Records	—	
1974	The Bing Crosby Story Volume I: The Early Jazz Years, 1928-1932 (compilation)	Columbia Special Products	—	
1975	A Southern Memoir	London Records	—	
1975	That's What Life Is All About	United Artists	28 (UK)	BPI: Silver
1975	A Couple of Song and Dance Men (w/ Fred Astaire)	United Artists	—	
1976	Tom Sawyer (recorded in 1975)	Argo	—	
1976	At My Time of Life	United Artists	—	
1976	Bing Crosby Live at the London Palladium	K-tel	9 (UK)	
1976	Feels Good, Feels Right	Decca	—	
1977	Beautiful Memories (recorded in 1976)	United Artists	—	
1977	Bingo Viejo (recorded in 1975)	London Records / Anahuac	—	
1977	A Tribute to Duke (also featuring Tony Bennett, Rosemary Clooney, and Woody Herman)	Concord Jazz	—	
1977	Seasons (Bing Crosby's last studio album released during his lifetime)	Polydor	25 (UK)	BPI: Silver

== Posthumous releases and compilations ==
Year	Album	Label	Peak chart position	Certifications
1977	The Greatest Hits of Bing Crosby (M.F. Productions 2 LP)	Jay Norris	—	
1977	Where the Blue of the Night Meets the Gold of the Sky (Biograph BLP-M-1)	Biograph	—	
1977	Kraft Music Hall January 29, 1942	Spokane Records	—	
1977	Harry Lillis Crosby	Columbia Special Products	—	
1977	Bing Crosby's Good Time Favorites	Capitol Records	—	
1977	Remembered	Columbia Special Products	—	
1977	Bing in the Thirties	Spokane Records	—	
1977	Bing Crosby Golden Memories (6-LP box set)	Columbia Special Products	—	
1977	Distinctively Bing, Volume 1	Sunbeam	—	
1977	Distinctively Bing, Volume 2	Sunbeam	—	
1977	A Legendary Performer	RCA	—	
1977	White Christmas (Christmas collection - also featuring Rosemary Clooney)	Collector's Gold	—	
1977	Bing Crosby's Greatest Hits	MCA Records	98	
1977	Bing Crosby's Christmas Classics (Christmas collection - abridged version of I Wish You a Merry Christmas)	Capitol Records	—	
1977	Happy Holiday With Frank & Bing (Christmas collection - also featuring Frank Sinatra)	Collector's Gold	—	
1978	Bing Sings (96 of His Greatest Hits) (8-LP box set)	Reader's Digest Music	—	RIAA: 2× Platinum
1978	Bing Crosby Happy Holiday (Christmas collection)	Spokane Records	—	
1978	The Greatest Christmas Shows (Christmas collection)	Fox American	—	
1978	A Bing Crosby Collection, Volume I	Columbia	—	
1978	A Bing Crosby Collection, Volume II	Columbia	—	
1979	A Bing Crosby Collection, Volume III	Columbia	—	
1979	Swing with Bing	Koala	—	
1979	Christmas with Bing Crosby and the Harry Simeone Chorale (Christmas collection)	51 West Records & Tapes	—	
1979	You Keep Coming Back Like a Song	Koala	—	
1980	Bing - The Final Chapter	BBC Records	—	
1980	Christmas with Bing (Christmas collection)	Reader's Digest, RCA Custom	—	
1980	Bing Sings Again (8-LP box set)	Reader's Digest Music	—	
1980	Judy And Bing (Mail Call #2) (also featuring Judy Garland)	Tandem Records	—	
1981	On the Air (also featuring the Music Maids)	Spokane Records	—	
1981	Bing and Connee on the Air (also featuring Connee Boswell)	Spokane Records	—	
1981	Music Hall Highlights (with the John Scott Trotter Orchestra)	Spokane Records	—	
1982	Rare 1930-31 Brunswick Recordings	MCA Records	—	
1983	Bing & Bob (also featuring Bob Hope)	Spokane Records	—	
1983	Bing Crosby with Glenn Miller and American Band of the Allied Expediatory Forces Orchestra	Broadway Intermission	—	
1983	Crosbyana - Volume II "The Fabulous Rice Tapes - 1937"	Broadway Intermission	—	
1983	Bing's Rare First Broadcast	Frogbien Records	—	
1983	Havin' Fun! (also featuring Louis Armstrong)	Sounds Rare	—	
1983	More Fun! (also featuring Louis Armstrong)	Sounds Rare	—	
1984	Crosby & Como (also featuring Perry Como)	Broadway Intermission	—	
1984	Crosbyana - Volume III: The War Years	Broadway Intermission	—	
1984	Christmas with Bing (Christmas collection)	Capitol Records	—	
1984	Bing in the Thirties - Volume 5	Spokane Records	—	
1985	The Radio Years, Volume 1	GNP Crescendo	—	
1985	The Radio Years, Volume 2	GNP Crescendo	—	
1985	Der Bingle - Volume 4	Spokane Records	—	
1985	Christmas Wishes (Christmas collection - also featuring the Hollywood Bowl Symphony Orchestra)	Capitol Records	—	
1985	Bing in the Thirties - Volume 6	Spokane Records	—	
1985	Favorites By Bing Crosby	Capitol Records	—	
1985	Just for Fun	Broadway Intermission	—	
1985	Bing Crosby - Legendary Singers	Time Life Music	—	
1986	Bing Crosby Sings Christmas Songs (Christmas collection)	MCA Records	—	
1986	Dancing and Reminiscing with Bing Crosby	Reader's Digest Music	—	
1986	Crosbyana - Volume 5 From Bing's Collection	Broadway Intermission	—	
1986	The Radio Years, Volume 3 (with Rosemary Clooney, Burl Ives, and Maurice Chevalier )	GNP Crescendo	—	
1986	Bing Crosby Sings Again	MCA Records	—	
1986	White Christmas (Christmas collection)	Metacom, Inc.	—	
1986	Home Town Christmas (Christmas collection - also featuring Kate Smith)	RCA Special Products	—	
1987	Tenth Anniversary Collection (3-CD box set)	Warwick Records (UK)	—	BPI: Silver
1987	Island Magic! / Hawaiian Gold	The Good Music Record Co.	—	
1987	Lady of Spain	Golden Circle, Inc.	—	
1987	Bing Sings Crosby	Broadway Intermission	—	
1987	White Christmas – Bing Crosby Sings Yuletide Favorites (Christmas collection)	Reader's Digest	—	
1988	Together Again (also featuring Red Nichols)	Broadway Intermission	—	
1988	Bing & Dinah (also featuring Dinah Shore)	Spokane Records	—	
1988	The Crooner: The Columbia Years 1928-1934 (3-CD box set)	Columbia	—	
1988	His Most Loved Recordings	MCA Records	—	
1988	Bing Crosby & Rosemary Clooney Christmas (Christmas collection)	MCA Records	—	
1988	Pennies from Heaven (Christmas collection)	Fanfare, Pro-Arte Digital	—	
1988	Bing in the Thirties - Volume 7	Spokane Records	—	
1989	MacNamara's Band	MCA Special Products	—	
1989	It's Christmas Time (Christmas collection - also featuring Frank Sinatra and Nat King Cole)	Laserlight Digital	—	
1989	Love Songs - The Crosby Way	Capitol Special Markets	—	
1989	Winter Wonderland (Christmas collection - also featuring Nat "King" Cole and Dean Martin)	CEMA Special Markets	—	
1989	Pocketful Of Dreams	Fanfare	—	
1989	Christmas (Christmas collection - also featuring Liberace)	MCA Special Products	—	
1990	The All-Time Best Of Bing Crosby	Curb Records	—	
1990	The Christmas Songs Featuring War-time Christmas Broadcasts (Christmas collection)	Vintage Jazz Classics	—	
1991	White Christmas (Christmas collection)	Laserlight Digital	—	
1991	A Visit To The Movies	Laserlight Digital	—	
1991	Christmas With Bing Crosby, Nat "King" Cole, Dean Martin (Christmas collection)	One Way Records	—	
1992	16 Most Requested Songs	Legacy	—	
1992	White Christmas and Other Favorites (Christmas collection)	Spirit of Christmas Nelson	—	
1992	Merry Christmas from Bing Crosby, Nat "King" Cole & Julie Andrews (Christmas collection)	GSC Music	—	
1992	Mail Call (Armed Forces Radio Broadcasts) (also featuring Judy Garland)	Laserlight Digital	—	
1993	Bing: His Legendary Years 1931–1957 (4-CD box set)	MCA Records	—	
1993	Crosby Family Christmas (Christmas collection)	Pilz	—	
1993	White Christmas (Christmas collection)	Eclipse Music Group	—	
1993	Christmas with Bing & Frank (Christmas collection - also featuring Frank Sinatra)	Eclipse Music Group	—	
1993	The Radio Years (single-CD version compiled from the previous three volumes)	GNP Crescendo	—	
1993	Christmas Classics (Christmas collection)	MCA Records, The Beautiful Music Company	—	
1994	That Christmas Feeling (Christmas collection - also featuring Frank Sinatra)	Regency Music	—	
1994	WWII Radio (March 9 and June 29, 1944)	LaserLight Digital	—	
1994	WWII Radio (July 6 and November 30, 1944)	LaserLight Digital	—	
1994	WWII Radio (January 8 and 25, 1945)	LaserLight Digital	—	
1994	WWII Radio (October 7 and December 16, 1943)	LaserLight Digital	—	
1995	Christmas Through the Years (Christmas collection)	LaserLight Digital	—	
1996	A Little Bit of Irish (posthumous edition, recorded in 1966)	Atlantic Records, Golden Olden Recordings	—	
1996	Bing Crosby, Rosemary Clooney & Friends (Christmas collection)	MasterTone	—	
1996	Live Duets 1947-1949	Viper's Nest	—	
1996	My Favorite Country Songs	MCA Special Products	—	
1996	My Favorite Love Songs	MCA Special Products	—	
1996	Their Complete Recordings Together (also featuring the Andrews Sisters)	MCA Records, Decca	—	
1996	Christmas Sing with Frank and Bing (Christmas collection - also featuring Frank Sinatra)	LaserLight Digital	—	
1996	Top O' the Morning - His Irish Collection (also featuring the Andrews Sisters)	MCA Records, Decca	—	
1997	Bing's Gold Records - The Original Decca Recordings	MCA Records	—	
1997	My Favorite Irish Songs	MCA Records	—	
1997	When Irish Eyes are Smiling / Shillelaghs and Shamrocks	MCA Records	—	
1997	My Favorite Hawaiian Songs	MCA Special Products	—	
1997	His Greatest Hits and Finest Performances	Universal Music Special Markets, Reader's Digest Music	—	
1998	Bing Crosby: The Voice of Christmas (Christmas collection)	MCA Records, Spectrum Music	—	BPI: Silver (Note: 2010 release)
1998	Winter Wonderland (Christmas collection)	EMI Gold (UK)	—	BPI: Silver (Note: 2002 release)
1998	It's Christmas Time (Christmas collection - also featuring Frank Sinatra and Louis Armstrong)	LaserLight Digital	—	
1998	Silver Bells of Christmas (Christmas collection - also featuring Rosemary Clooney)	KRB Music Companies	—	
1998	The Holiday Album (Christmas collection - also featuring Nat King Cole)	Fine Tune	—	
1999	The Best of Bing Crosby (20th Century Masters – The Millennium Collection)	MCA Records	—	
1999	Legends of The 20th Century	EMI	—	
1999	The Very Best of Bing Crosby Christmas (Christmas collection)	MCA Records	14 (Note: 2018 rerelease)	
1999	Christmas with Bing Crosby - All-Time Favorites (Christmas collection)	Universal Music Special Markets, GSC Music	—	
1999	My Favorite Hawaiian Songs	MCA Special Products	—	
1999	I'll Be Home for Christmas (Christmas collection)	Sleigh Bells	—	
2000	The Best of the War Years	Stardust Records	—	
2000	A Merry Christmas with Bing Crosby & the Andrews Sisters (Christmas collection)	MCA Records	—	
2000	Academy Award Winners & Nominees 1934-1960	MCA	—	
2001	Bing Crosby & Friends Christmas Special - featuring Frank Sinatra (Christmas collection)	Park South Records	—	
2001	Song Hits From The Movies 1930 to 1953	Nimbus Records	—	
2001	Christmas with Bing Crosby (Christmas collection)	Lifestyles	—	
2001	Two Classic Albums from Bing Crosby	Collectors' Choice Music	—	
2001	Lost Columbia Sides 1928-1933	Collectors' Choice Music	—	
2001	Bing Crosby In Hollywood (1930-1934) Volume One	Collectables	—	
2001	Bing Crosby In Hollywood (1930-1934) Volume Two	Collectables	—	
2001	Cocktail Hour - Duets	Allegro Corporation, Columbia River Entertainment Group	—	
2002	The Radio Years (double-CD box set compiled from the earlier three volumes)	GNP Crescendo	—	
2002	The Bing Crosby Radio Variety Show	Mr Punch Audio	—	
2002	Christmas with Bing Crosby (Christmas collection)	Universal Music Special Markets, Platinum Legends	—	
2003	Songs of WWII	Delta	—	
2003	Bing Crosby Christmas (Christmas collection)	NorthQuest	—	
2003	A Centennial Anthology of His Decca Recordings	MCA Records	—	
2003	The Essential Bing Crosby: The Columbia Years	Columbia, Legacy	—	
2004	Bing Crosby Christmas Collection (Christmas collection)	PolyGram Group Distribution, Inc.	—	
2004	Swingin' with Bing, Bing Crosby's Lost Radio Performances	Shout! Factory	—	
2004	Have Yourself a Merry Little Christmass (Christmas collection)	Liquid 8 Records	—	
2004	Two Of A Kind (also featuring Bob Hope)	Universal Special Products	—	
2005	Bing Crosby Christmas Collection (Christmas collection)	Timeless Media Group	—	
2005	The Original Crooner	American Legends	—	
2005	America's Favorite Entertainer	American Legends	—	
2005	Christmas with Frank Sinatra & Bing Crosby (Christmas collection)	St. Clair Entertainment Group, Inc.	—	
2006	The Definitive Collection	Geffen Records	—	
2006	Christmas Classics (Christmas collection)	Capitol Records, UMe	12 (Note: 2017 rerelease)	BPI: Silver (Note: 2017 rerelease)
2006	White Christmas (Christmas collection - also featuring Rosemary Clooney)	LaserLight Digital	—	
2006	White Christmas (Christmas collection - different from above collection)	LaserLight Digital	—	
2006	The Essentials	Fantastic Price Records	—	
2006	Caroling with The Crooners (Christmas collection - also featuring Frank Sinatra and Nat King Cole)	KRB Music Companies	—	
2006	Best Of Bing Crosby	Direct Source Special Products Inc.	—	
2006	The Centennial Anthology (also included a DVD)	Master Classics	—	
2007	Seasons Greetings from Frank Sinatra & Bing Crosby (Christmas collection)	EMI Music Special Markets	—	
2007	Hits Of Bing Crosby	NorthQuest	—	
2007	A Crosby Christmas (Christmas collection)	Varèse Sarabande	—	
2007	Christmas With Bing Crosby & Friends (Christmas collection)	Forever Gold	—	
2008	Gold	Geffen Records	—	
2008	Bing Crosby Christmas (Christmas collection)	Allegro Corporation	—	
2009	The Essentials	Stardust Records	—	
2009	Bing Crosby White Christmas (Christmas collection)	Lifestyles	—	
2009	The Bing Crosby CBS Radio Recordings 1954-56 (7-CD box set)	Mosaic Records	—	
2010	On the Sentimental Side (posthumous edition, recorded in 1962; Bing Crosby's latest studio album)	Collectors' Choice Music	—	
2010	Bing on Broadway	Collectors' Choice Music	—	
2010	So Rare: Treasures from the Crosby Archive	Collectors' Choice Music	—	
2010	Bing Sings the Sinatra Songbook	Collectors' Choice Music	—	
2010	The Crosby Christmas Sessions (Christmas collection)	Collectors' Choice Music	—	
2010	Bing Sings the Great American Songbook	Collectors' Choice Music	—	
2010	The Crosby-Clooney Radio Sessions	Collectors' Choice Music	—	
2011	Christmas Favorites (Christmas collection)	The Bing Crosby Archive	—	
2011	Icon	Geffen Records, UMe	—	
2011	Bing In Dixieland	Bing Crosby Enterprises	—	
2011	Christmas (Christmas collection)	Sonoma Entertainment	—	
2011	Christmas by the Fire (Christmas collection - came with a fireplace DVD)	Universal Music Special Markets	—	
2012	Christmas (10 Great Songs) (Christmas collection)	Capitol Records	—	
2012	Bing Crosby Christmas (Christmas collection)	Lifestyles	—	
2012	Through The Years: Volume Ten (with Paul Weston and His Orchestra, Norman Luboff Choir, Dick Haymes, & The Andrews Sisters)	Sepia Records	—	
2013	Christmas with Bing! (Christmas collection)	Sony Music Commercial Music Group, The Bing Crosby Archive	—	
2013	Bing Sings the Johnny Mercer Songbook	Bing Crosby Enterprises	—	
2014	Bing Sings the Irving Berlin Songbook	Bing Crosby Enterprises	—	
2014	American Masters: Bing Crosby Rediscovered - The Soundtrack	Bing Crosby Enterprises	—	
2016	The Twelve Days Of Christmas/Radio Broadcast (Christmas collection)	Sounds Of Yester Year	—	
2017	Among My Souvenirs: More Treasures from the Crosby Archive	UMe	—	
2017	Christmas (Christmas collection)	Newbourne Media, Universal Music Special Markets	—	
2019	Bing at Christmas (Christmas collection)	Decca	9 (UK)	BPI: Silver
2021	The All-Time Best of Bing Crosby	Curb Records	—	
2023	A Valentine from Bing	Primary Wave Music (Worldwide)	—	
2023	Bing Crosby’s Irish Songbook	Primary Wave Music (Worldwide)	—	
2023	Bing & Ella (w/ Ella Fitzgerald)	Primary Wave Music	—	
2023	Bing Crosby's Christmas Gems (Christmas collection)	Primary Wave Music	—	
2023	Bing at the Movies (Volume 1)	Primary Wave Music (Worldwide)	—	
2024	Ultimate Christmas (Christmas collection)	UMG Recordings	2 (US)	

== Singles ==
=== Pre-Decca era ===
Year	Single	Chart positions				
Year	Single	US (Note: Joel Whitburn's methodology for creating pre-1940s chart placings has been criticised, and they should not be taken as definitive.)	US R&B	US AC	US Country	UK
1927	"Muddy Water" (with Paul Whiteman)	11	—	—	—	—
1927	"Side by Side" (The Rhythm Boys with Paul Whiteman)	3	—	—	—	—
1927	"I'm Coming, Virginia" (The Rhythm Boys with Paul Whiteman)	6	—	—	—	—
1927	"My Blue Heaven" (with Paul Whiteman et al.)	1	—	—	—	—
1927	"The Calinda" (with Paul Whiteman et al.)	7	—	—	—	—
1928	"Changes" (with Paul Whiteman et al.)	4	—	—	—	—
1928	"Ol' Man River" (with Paul Whiteman)	1	—	—	—	—
1928	"Make Believe" (with Paul Whiteman)	7	—	—	—	—
1928	"Sunshine" (with Paul Whiteman et al.)	6	—	—	—	—
1928	"Mississippi Mud" (with Paul Whiteman et al.)	6	—	—	—	—
1928	"Mississippi Mud" (with Frankie Trumbauer)	18	—	—	—	—
1928	"From Monday On" (with Paul Whiteman et al.)	14	—	—	—	—
1928	"You Took Advantage of Me" (with Paul Whiteman et al.)	9	—	—	—	—
1928	"Louisiana" (with Paul Whiteman et al.)	12	—	—	—	—
1928	"It Was the Dawn of Love" (with Paul Whiteman et al.)	19	—	—	—	—
1928	"I'm on the Crest of a Wave" (with Paul Whiteman et al.)	6	—	—	—	—
1928	"Out-O'-Town Gal" (with Paul Whiteman et al.)	16	—	—	—	—
1929	"Makin' Whoopee" (with Paul Whiteman et al.)	8	—	—	—	—
1929	"Let's Do It" (with Dorsey Brothers)	9	—	—	—	—
1929	"Louise" (with Paul Whiteman)	6	—	—	—	—
1929	"Little Pal" (with Paul Whiteman)	9	—	—	—	—
1929	"Your Mother and Mine" (with Paul Whiteman et al.)	16	—	—	—	—
1929	"Waiting at the End of the Road" (with Paul Whiteman)	12	—	—	—	—
1929	"I'm A Dreamer, Aren't We All?" (with Paul Whiteman et al.)	6	—	—	—	—
1929	"If I Had a Talking Picture of You" (with Paul Whiteman)	7	—	—	—	—
1929	"Great Day" (with Paul Whiteman)	1	—	—	—	—
1929	"Without a Song" (with Paul Whiteman)	6	—	—	—	—
1929	"A Bundle of Old Love Letters" (with Paul Whiteman)	10	—	—	—	—
1930	"After You've Gone" (with Paul Whiteman)	14	—	—	—	—
1930	"I Like to Do Things for You" (with Paul Whiteman et al.)	19	—	—	—	—
1930	"You Brought a New Kind of Love to Me" (with Paul Whiteman)	3	—	—	—	—
1930	"Livin' in the Sunlight, Lovin' in the Moonlight" (with Paul Whiteman)	16	—	—	—	—
1930	"It Must Be True" (with Gus Arnheim)	4	—	—	—	—
1930	"Three Little Words" (with Duke Ellington et al.)	1	—	—	—	—
1930	"Them There Eyes" (with Gus Arnheim & The Rhythm Boys)	7	—	—	—	—
1931	"The Little Things in Life" (with Gus Arnheim)	4	—	—	—	—
1931	"I Surrender Dear" (with Gus Arnheim)	3	—	—	—	—
1931	"One More Time" (with Gus Arnheim)	4	—	—	—	—
1931	"Just a Gigolo"	12	—	—	—	—
1931	"Out of Nowhere"	1	—	—	—	—
1931	"Ho Hum!" (with Gus Arnheim & Loyce Whiteman)	6	—	—	—	—
1931	"Wrap Your Troubles in Dreams"	4	—	—	—	—
1931	"Just One More Chance"	1	—	—	—	—
1931	"Were You Sincere?"	12	—	—	—	—
1931	"I Found a Million Dollar Baby"	2	—	—	—	—
1931	"I'm Thru with Love"	3	—	—	—	—
1931	"At Your Command"	1	—	—	—	—
1931	"Many Happy Returns of the Day"	3	—	—	—	—
1931	"Stardust"	5	—	—	—	—
1931	"Dancing in the Dark"	3	—	—	—	—
1931	"I Apologize"	3	—	—	—	—
1931	"Sweet and Lovely"	9	—	—	—	—
1931	"Goodnight, Sweetheart"	5	—	—	—	—
1931	"A Faded Summer Love"	8	—	—	—	—
1931	"Gems from George White's Scandals" (with Mills Brothers, The Boswell Sisters & Victor Young)	3	—	—	—	—
1932	"Dinah" (with Mills Brothers)	1	—	—	—	—
1932	"Can't We Talk It Over?" (with Helen Crawford)	10	—	—	—	—
1932	"Where the Blue of the Night (Meets the Gold of the Day)" (Bing's Theme Song)	4	—	—	—	—
1932	"Snuggled on Your Shoulder (Cuddled in Your Arms)"	11	—	—	—	—
1932	"Paradise"	7	—	—	—	—
1932	"Shine" (with Mills Brothers)	7	—	—	—	—
1932	"Lazy Day"	4	—	—	—	—
1932	"Sweet Georgia Brown"	2	—	—	—	—
1932	"Cabin in the Cotton"	11	—	—	—	—
1932	"Love Me Tonight"	4	—	—	—	—
1932	"Some of These Days"	16	—	—	—	—
1932	"Please"	1	—	—	—	—
1932	"Waltzing in a Dream"	6	—	—	—	—
1932	"Here Lies Love"	11	—	—	—	—
1932	"Brother, Can You Spare a Dime?"	1	—	—	—	—
1933	"Just an Echo in the Valley"	2	—	—	—	—
1933	"I Don't Stand a Ghost of a Chance with You"	5	—	—	—	—
1933	"Street of Dreams"	13	—	—	—	—
1933	"You're Getting to Be a Habit with Me"	1	—	—	—	—
1933	"Young and Healthy"	2	—	—	—	—
1933	"You're Beautiful Tonight, My Dear"	12	—	—	—	—
1933	"I've Got the World on a String"	19	—	—	—	—
1933	"You've Got Me Crying Again"	12	—	—	—	—
1933	"Shadow Waltz"	1	—	—	—	—
1933	"I've Got to Sing a Torch Song"	9	—	—	—	—
1933	"Learn to Croon"	3	—	—	—	—
1933	"Down the Old Ox Road"	8	—	—	—	—
1933	"Blue Prelude"	10	—	—	—	—
1933	"My Love"	4	—	—	—	—
1933	"Thanks"	2	—	—	—	—
1933	"The Day You Came Along"	3	—	—	—	—
1933	"The Last Round-Up"	2	—	—	—	—
1933	"Home on the Range"	18	—	—	—	—
1933	"Beautiful Girl"	11	—	—	—	—
1933	"Temptation"	3	—	—	—	—
1933	"Did You Ever See a Dream Walking?"	5	—	—	—	—
1934	"We'll Make Hay While the Sun Shines"	8	—	—	—	—
1934	"Little Dutch Mill"	1	—	—	—	—
1934	"Good Night, Lovely Little Lady"	2	—	—	—	—
1934	"Once in a Blue Moon"	11	—	—	—	—
1934	"Love Thy Neighbor"	2	—	—	—	—
1934	"Ridin' Around in the Rain"	13	—	—	—	—
1934	"May I?"	4	—	—	—	—
1934	"She Reminds Me of You"	10	—	—	—	—
1934	"Love in Bloom"	1	—	—	—	—
1934	"Straight from the Shoulder"	16	—	—	—	—
1934	"Give Me a Heart to Sing To"	12	—	—	—	—

=== Decca and beyond ===
Year	Single	Chart positions				
Year	Single	US	US R&B	US AC	US Country	UK
1934	"Two Cigarettes in the Dark"	5	—	—	—	—
1934	"The Very Thought of You"	11	—	—	—	—
1934	"The Moon Was Yellow"	13	—	—	—	—
1934	"June in January" (from Crosbyana)	1	—	—	—	—
1934	"Love Is Just Around the Corner" (from Crosbyana)	8	—	—	—	—
1934	"With Every Breath I Take" (from Crosbyana)	4	—	—	—	—
1934	"Maybe I'm Wrong Again"	14	—	—	—	—
1935	"Soon" (from Crosbyana)	1	—	—	—	—
1935	"Down by the River" (from Crosbyana)	17	—	—	—	—
1935	"It's Easy to Remember" (from Crosbyana)	1	—	—	—	—
1935	"I Wished on the Moon" (from Crosbyana)	2	—	—	—	—
1935	"Without a Word of Warning" (from Crosbyana)	5	—	—	—	—
1935	"I Wish I Were Aladdin" (from Crosbyana)	7	—	—	—	—
1935	"From the Top of Your Head to the Tip of Your Toes" (from Crosbyana)	10	—	—	—	—
1935	"Red Sails in the Sunset"	1	—	—	—	—
1935	"Silent Night" (gold record) (from Christmas Music)	7	—	—	—	—
1935	"On Treasure Island"	8	—	—	—	—
1936	"Would You?"	20	—	—	—	—
1936	"The Touch of Your Lips"	4	—	—	—	—
1936	"Robins and Roses"	2	—	—	—	—
1936	"It Ain't Necessarily So"	18	—	—	—	—
1936	"I'm an Old Cowhand" (from Cowboy Songs)	2	—	—	—	—
1936	"I Can't Escape from You"	7	—	—	—	—
1936	"Empty Saddles" (from Under Western Skies)	8	—	—	—	—
1936	"Song of the Islands" (from Music of Hawaii)	14	—	—	—	—
1936	"South Sea Island Magic" (from Favorite Hawaiian Songs)	3	—	—	—	—
1936	"Me and the Moon"	9	—	—	—	—
1936	"Pennies from Heaven"	1	—	—	—	—
1936	"Let's Call a Heart a Heart"	10	—	—	—	—
1936	"So Do I"	18	—	—	—	—
1937	"One, Two, Button Your Shoe"	19	—	—	—	—
1937	"Sweet Leilani" (gold record) (from Favorite Hawaiian Songs)	1	—	—	—	—
1937	"Blue Hawaii" (from Favorite Hawaiian Songs)	5	—	—	—	—
1937	"Too Marvelous for Words"	1	—	—	—	—
1937	"What Will I Tell My Heart?"	5	—	—	—	—
1937	"Sweet Is the Word for You"	8	—	—	—	—
1937	"Never in a Million Years"	2	—	—	—	—
1937	"Moonlight and Shadows"	10	—	—	—	—
1937	"My Little Buckaroo" (from Cowboy Songs)	19	—	—	—	—
1937	"Peckin'" (w/ Jimmy Dorsey)	9	—	—	—	—
1937	"The Moon Got in My Eyes"	1	—	—	—	—
1937	"(You Know It All) Smarty"	18	—	—	—	—
1937	"It's the Natural Thing to Do"	2	—	—	—	—
1937	"Remember Me?"	1	—	—	—	—
1937	"I Still Love to Kiss You Goodnight"	6	—	—	—	—
1937	"Can I Forget You?"	8	—	—	—	—
1937	"Bob White (Whatcha Gonna Swing Tonight?)" (w/ Connee Boswell)	1	—	—	—	—
1937	"Basin Street Blues" (w/ Connee Boswell)	12	—	—	—	—
1937	"The One Rose (That's Left in My Heart)"	8	—	—	—	—
1937	"Sail Along, Silv'ry Moon" (from Favorite Hawaiian Songs)	4	—	—	—	—
1938	"When the Organ Played 'O, Promise Me'"	5	—	—	—	—
1938	"There's a Gold Mine in the Sky" (w/ Eddie Dunstedter) (from Cowboy Songs)	6	—	—	—	—
1938	"On the Sentimental Side"	4	—	—	—	—
1938	"The Moon of Manakoora"	10	—	—	—	—
1938	"Let Me Whisper I Love You"	7	—	—	—	—
1938	"When Mother Nature Sings Her Lullaby"	3	—	—	—	—
1938	"Now It Can Be Told"	7	—	—	—	—
1938	"I've Got a Pocketful of Dreams"	1	—	—	—	—
1938	"Small Fry" (w/ Johnny Mercer) (from Small Fry)	3	—	—	—	—
1938	"Mr. Gallagher & Mr. Shean" (w/ Johnny Mercer) (from Bing Crosby Sings with Judy Garland, Mary Martin, Johnny Mercer)	7	—	—	—	—
1938	"Alexander's Ragtime Band" (w/ Connee Boswell)	1	—	—	—	—
1938	"Don't Let That Moon Get Away"	19	—	—	—	—
1938	"Mexicali Rose" (from Cowboy Songs)	3	—	—	—	—
1938	"My Reverie"	3	—	—	—	—
1938	"You Must Have Been a Beautiful Baby"	1	—	—	—	—
1939	"You're a Sweet Little Headache"	3	—	—	—	—
1939	"I Have Eyes"	4	—	—	—	—
1939	"The Funny Old Hills"	5	—	—	—	—
1939	"Someone Stole Gabriel's Horn" (w/ The Dorsey Brothers)	14	—	—	—	—
1939	"It's a Lonely Trail" (from Cowboy Songs)	17	—	—	—	—
1939	"The Lonesome Road" (from Star Dust)	12	—	—	—	—
1939	"I Cried for You" (from Star Dust)	13	—	—	—	—
1939	"Between a Kiss and a Sigh"	15	—	—	—	—
1939	"My Melancholy Baby" (from Star Dust)	14	—	—	—	—
1939	"Ah! Sweet Mystery of Life" (from Victor Herbert Melodies, Vol. 1)	12	—	—	—	—
1939	"East Side of Heaven"	6	—	—	—	—
1939	"Sing a Song of Sunbeams"	8	—	—	—	—
1939	"Deep Purple" (from Star Dust)	14	—	—	—	—
1939	"God Bless America" (from Patriotic Songs for Children)	17	—	—	—	—
1939	"That Sly Old Gentleman (from Featherbed Lane)" (from Small Fry)	10	—	—	—	—
1939	"Little Sir Echo" (from Small Fry)	3	—	—	—	—
1939	"And the Angels Sing"	10	—	—	—	—
1939	"Alla en el rancho grande"	6	—	—	—	—
1939	"Whistling in the Wildwood"	14	—	—	—	—
1939	"An Apple for the Teacher" (w/ Connee Boswell) (from Small Fry)	2	—	—	—	—
1939	"Go Fly a Kite"	10	—	—	—	—
1939	"A Man and His Dream"	4	—	—	—	—
1939	"Start the Day Right" (w/ Connee Boswell) (from Bing and Connee)	12	—	—	—	—
1939	"What's New?"	2	—	—	—	—
1939	"Ciribiribin (They're So in Love)" (w/ The Andrews Sisters) (from Bing Crosby and The Andrews Sisters - EP)	13	—	—	—	—
1939	"Yodelin' Jive" (w/ The Andrews Sisters) (from Bing Crosby and The Andrews Sisters - EP)	4	—	—	—	—
1939	"My Isle of Golden Dreams" (from Favorite Hawaiian Songs)	18	—	—	—	—
1940	"Between 18th & 19th on Chestnut Street" (w/ Connee Boswell) (from Bing and Connee)	12	—	—	—	—
1940	"Sweet Potato Piper"	11	—	—	—	—
1940	"Just One More Chance" (re-recording; see 1931)	16	—	—	—	—
1940	"I'm Too Romantic" (aka "Too Romantic")	3	—	—	—	—
1940	"The Singing Hills" (from Under Western Skies)	3	—	—	—	—
1940	"Tumbling Tumbleweeds" (from Under Western Skies)	12	—	—	—	—
1940	"April Played the Fiddle"	10	—	—	—	—
1940	"I Haven't Time to Be a Millionaire"	13	—	—	—	—
1940	"Meet the Sun Half-Way"	15	—	—	—	—
1940	"Sierra Sue" (from Under Western Skies)	2	—	—	—	—
1940	"Mister Meadowlark" (w/ Johnny Mercer) (from Bing Crosby Sings with Judy Garland, Mary Martin, Johnny Mercer)	18	—	—	—	—
1940	"Trade Winds" (from Hawaii Calls)	2	—	—	—	—
1940	"Can't Get Indiana Off My Mind"	8	—	—	—	—
1940	"That's for Me"	9	—	—	—	—
1940	"Only Forever"	1	—	—	—	—
1940	"When the Moon Comes Over Madison Square"	27	—	—	—	—
1940	"Where the Blue of the Night (Meets the Gold of the Day)" (re-recording; see 1932) (from Drifting and Dreaming)	27	—	—	—	—
1940	"You Made Me Love You"	25	—	—	—	—
1941	"Please" (re-recording; see 1932)	24	—	—	—	—
1941	"Along the Santa Fe Trail" (from Under Western Skies)	4	—	—	—	—
1941	"Lone Star Trail" (from Under Western Skies)	23	—	—	—	—
1941	"New San Antonio Rose" (from Don't Fence Me In)	7	—	—	—	—
1941	"It Makes No Difference Now" (from Don't Fence Me In)	23	—	—	—	—
1941	"Did Your Mother Come From Ireland?" (from St. Patrick's Day)	22	—	—	—	—
1941	"Dolores"	2	—	—	—	—
1941	"Paradise Isle" (from Favorite Hawaiian Songs, Vol. One)	23	—	—	—	—
1941	"You and I"	5	—	—	—	—
1941	"Brahms' Lullaby"	20	—	—	—	—
1941	"'Til Reveille"	6	—	—	—	—
1941	"Be Honest with Me" (from Don't Fence Me In)	19	—	—	—	—
1941	"You Are My Sunshine" (from Don't Fence Me In)	19	—	—	—	—
1941	"The Whistler's Mother-in-law" (w/ Muriel Lane)	9	—	—	—	—
1941	"The Waiter and the Porter and the Upstairs Maid" (w/ Mary Martin & Jack Teagarden)	23	—	—	—	—
1941	"Clementine"	20	—	—	—	—
1941	"Shepherd Serenade"	4	—	—	—	—
1941	"The Anniversary Waltz"	24	—	—	—	—
1942	"Deep in the Heart of Texas"	3	—	—	—	—
1942	"I Don't Want to Walk Without You"	9	—	—	—	—
1942	"Sing Me a Song of the Islands" (from Favorite Hawaiian Songs, Vol. Two)	22	—	—	—	—
1942	"Miss You"	9	—	—	—	—
1942	"The Lamplighter's Serenade"	23	—	—	—	—
1942	"When the White Azaleas Start Blooming"	21	—	—	—	—
1942	"Skylark"	14	—	—	—	—
1942	"The Bombardier Song"	19	—	—	—	—
1942	"Be Careful, It's My Heart" (from Song Hits from Holiday Inn)	2	—	—	—	—
1942	"White Christmas" (gold record) (from Song Hits from Holiday Inn)	1	1	3	—	5
1942	"Moonlight Becomes You"	3	—	—	—	—
1943	"Constantly"	13	—	—	—	—
1943	"Sunday, Monday, or Always" (gold record)	1	3	—	—	—
1943	"If You Please"	17	—	—	—	—
1943	"Mary's a Grand Old Name"	20	—	—	—	—
1943	"People Will Say We're in Love" (from Bing Crosby Sings the Song Hits from Broadway Shows)	2	—	—	—	—
1943	"Oh, What a Beautiful Mornin'" (from Bing Crosby Sings the Song Hits from Broadway Shows)	4	—	—	—	—
1943	"Pistol Packin' Mama" (w/ The Andrews Sisters) (gold record) (from Don't Fence Me In)	2	3	—	1	—
1943	"Vict'ry Polka" (w/ The Andrews Sisters)	5	—	—	—	—
1943	"I'll Be Home for Christmas (If Only in My Dreams)" (gold record) (from Merry Christmas)	3	8	—	—	—
1943	"White Christmas" (gold record) (see 1942)	6	—	—	—	—
1943	"Jingle Bells" (w/ The Andrews Sisters) (from Merry Christmas)	19	—	—	—	—
1943	"Let's Start the New Year Right" (from Song Hits from Holiday Inn)	18	—	—	—	—
1944	"San Fernando Valley"	1	—	—	—	—
1944	"Poinciana"	3	—	—	—	—
1944	"I Love You"	1	—	—	—	—
1944	"I'll Be Seeing You"	1	—	—	—	—
1944	"Swinging on a Star" (gold record) (from Selections from Going My Way)	1	—	—	—	—
1944	"Going My Way" (from Selections from Going My Way)	15	—	—	—	—
1944	"Is You Is or Is You Ain't My Baby" (w/ The Andrews Sisters)	2	—	—	—	—
1944	"Amor"	2	—	—	—	—
1944	"Long Ago (and Far Away)"	5	—	—	—	—
1944	"The Day After Forever"	15	—	—	—	—
1944	"Hot Time in the Town of Berlin" (w/ The Andrews Sisters)	1	—	—	—	—
1944	"It Could Happen to You"	18	—	—	—	—
1944	"Too-Ra-Loo-Ra-Loo-Ral" (gold record) (from Selections from Going My Way)	4	—	—	—	—
1944	"White Christmas" (gold record) (see 1942)	5	—	—	—	—
1944	"Don't Fence Me In" (w/ The Andrews Sisters) (gold record) (from Don't Fence Me In)	1	9	—	—	—
1945	"Evelina" (from Bing Crosby Sings the Song Hits from Broadway Shows)	9	—	—	—	—
1945	"Ac-Cent-Tchu-Ate the Positive" (w/ The Andrews Sisters)	2	—	—	—	—
1945	"The Three Caballeros" (w/ The Andrews Sisters)	8	—	—	—	—
1945	"Sleigh Ride in July"	14	—	—	—	—
1945	"Like Someone in Love"	15	—	—	—	—
1945	"Just a Prayer Away"	4	—	—	—	—
1945	"All of My Life"	12	—	—	—	—
1945	"Yah-ta-ta, Yah-ta-ta (Talk, Talk, Talk)" (w/ Judy Garland) (from Bing Crosby Sings with Judy Garland, Mary Martin, Johnny Mercer)	5	—	—	—	—
1945	"You Belong to My Heart" (from El Bingo – A Collection of Latin American Favorites)	3	—	—	—	—
1945	"Baia" (from El Bingo – A Collection of Latin American Favorites)	6	—	—	—	—
1945	"My Baby Said Yes" (w/ Louis Jordan)	14	—	—	—	—
1945	"On the Atchison, Topeka and the Santa Fe"	3	—	—	—	—
1945	"If I Loved You" (from Bing Crosby Sings the Song Hits from Broadway Shows)	8	—	—	—	—
1945	"Along the Navajo Trail" (w/ The Andrews Sisters) (from Go West Young Man)	2	—	—	—	—
1945	"It's Been a Long, Long Time" (w/ Les Paul Trio) (from Drifting and Dreaming)	1	—	—	—	—
1945	"The Road to Morocco" (w/ Bob Hope) (from Selections from Road to Utopia)	21	—	—	—	—
1945	"I Can't Begin to Tell You" (gold record)	1	—	—	—	—
1945	"White Christmas" (gold record) (see 1942)	1	—	—	—	—
1945	"Aren't You Glad You're You?" (from Selections from The Bells of St. Mary's)	8	—	—	—	—
1945	"In the Land of Beginning Again" (from Selections from The Bells of St. Mary's)	18	—	—	—	—
1945	"Symphony"	3	—	—	—	—
1946	"Give Me the Simple Life"	16	—	—	—	—
1946	"The Bells of St. Mary's" (from Selections from The Bells of St. Mary's)	21	—	—	—	—
1946	"McNamara's Band" (gold record) (from St. Patrick's Day)	10	—	—	—	—
1946	"Day by Day" (w/ Mel Tormé & His Mel-Tones)	15	—	—	—	—
1946	"Sioux City Sue"	3	—	—	—	—
1946	"Personality" (from Selections from Road to Utopia)	9	—	—	—	—
1946	"They Say It's Wonderful" (from Bing Crosby Sings the Song Hits from Broadway Shows)	12	—	—	—	—
1946	"South America, Take It Away" (w/ The Andrews Sisters) (gold record)	2	—	—	—	—
1946	"(Get Your Kicks on) Route 66" (w/ The Andrews Sisters)	14	—	—	—	—
1946	"Night and Day"	21	—	—	—	—
1946	"You Keep Coming Back Like a Song" (from Blue Skies)	12	—	—	—	—
1946	"White Christmas" (gold record) (see 1942)	1	—	—	—	—
1947	"A Gal in Calico"	8	—	—	—	—
1947	"Easter Parade" (from Song Hits from Holiday Inn)	22	—	—	—	—
1947	"That's How Much I Love You"	17	—	—	—	—
1947	"Alexander's Ragtime Band" (w/ Al Jolson) (gold record) (from Bing Crosby Sings with Al Jolson, Bob Hope, Dick Haymes and the Andrews Sisters)	20	—	—	—	—
1947	"Tallahassee" (w/ The Andrews Sisters)	10	—	—	—	—
1947	"There's No Business Like Show Business" (w/ The Andrews Sisters & Dick Haymes) (from Bing Crosby Sings with Al Jolson, Bob Hope, Dick Haymes and the Andrews Sisters)	25	—	—	—	—
1947	"Feudin' and Fightin'" (from Bing and the Dixieland Bands)	9	—	—	—	—
1947	"The Freedom Train" (w/ The Andrews Sisters)	21	—	—	—	—
1947	"You Do"	8	—	—	—	—
1947	"How Soon (Will I Be Seeing You?)"	6	—	—	—	—
1947	"The Whiffenpoof Song" (gold record) (from Auld Lang Syne)	7	—	—	—	—
1947	"White Christmas" (Note: BPI: Platinum 2x) (gold record) (see 1942)	3	—	—	—	—
1947	"Santa Claus Is Comin' to Town" (w/ The Andrews Sisters)	22	—	—	—	—
1947	"Silent Night" (new version)	22	—	—	—	8
1948	"Ballerina"	10	—	—	—	—
1948	"Now Is the Hour" (gold record) (from Auld Lang Syne)	1	—	—	—	—
1948	"You Don't Have to Know the Language" (w/ The Andrews Sisters) (from Selections from Road to Rio)	21	—	—	—	—
1948	"Pass That Peace Pipe"	21	—	—	—	—
1948	"But Beautiful" (from Selections from Road to Rio)	20	—	—	—	—
1948	"Blue Shadows on the Trail" (from Home on the Range)	23	—	—	—	—
1948	"A Fella with an Umbrella"	23	—	—	—	—
1948	"White Christmas" (gold record) (see 1942)	6	—	—	—	—
1948	"A Hundred and Sixty Acres" (w/ The Andrews Sisters) (from Go West Young Man)	23	—	—	—	—
1949	"Far Away Places"	2	—	—	—	—
1949	"Galway Bay" (gold record) (from When Irish Eyes Are Smiling)	3	—	—	—	—
1949	"If You Stub Your Toe on the Moon" (from A Connecticut Yankee in King Arthur's Court)	27	—	—	—	—
1949	"Careless Hands"	12	—	—	—	—
1949	"Riders in the Sky"	14	—	—	—	—
1949	"Some Enchanted Evening" (from South Pacific)	3	—	—	—	—
1949	"Bali Ha'i" (from South Pacific)	12	—	—	—	—
1949	"Dear Hearts and Gentle People" (gold record)	2	—	—	—	—
1949	"Mule Train"	4	—	—	—	—
1949	"Way Back Home" (from Way Back Home)	21	—	—	—	—
1949	"White Christmas" (gold record) (see 1942)	5	—	—	—	—
1950	"Have I Told You Lately That I Love You?" (w/ The Andrews Sisters) (from Go West Young Man)	24	—	—	—	—
1950	"Quicksilver" (w/ The Andrews Sisters) (from Go West Young Man)	6	—	—	—	—
1950	"Chattanoogie Shoe Shine Boy"	4	—	—	—	—
1950	"I Didn't Slip, I Wasn't Pushed, I Fell"	22	—	—	—	—
1950	"Play a Simple Melody" (w/ Gary Crosby) (gold record) (from Gary Crosby and Friend - EP)	4	—	—	—	—
1950	"Sam's Song" (w/ Gary Crosby) (from Gary Crosby and Friend - EP)	4	—	—	—	—
1950	"La Vie en rose"	13	—	—	—	—
1950	"I Cross My Fingers"	18	—	—	—	—
1950	"All My Love"	11	—	—	—	—
1950	"Beyond the Reef"	26	—	—	—	—
1950	"Harbor Lights"	8	—	—	—	—
1950	"White Christmas" (gold record) (see 1942)	13	—	—	—	—
1950	"Rudolph the Red-Nosed Reindeer"	14	—	—	—	—
1950	"A Crosby Christmas" (w/ his sons)	22	—	—	—	—
1951	"A Marshmallow World"	14	—	—	—	—
1951	"Sparrow in the Treetop" (w/ The Andrews Sisters)	8	—	—	—	—
1951	"When You and I Were Young, Maggie Blues" (w/ Gary Crosby) (from Gary Crosby and Friend - EP)	8	—	—	—	—
1951	"Moonlight Bay" (w/ Gary Crosby) (from Gary Crosby and Friend - EP)	14	—	—	—	—
1951	"Gone Fishin'" (w/ Louis Armstrong)	19	—	—	—	—
1951	"In the Cool, Cool, Cool of the Evening" (w/ Jane Wyman)	11	—	—	—	—
1951	"Shanghai"	21	—	—	—	—
1951	"Domino"	15	—	—	—	—
1951	"White Christmas" (gold record) (see 1942)	13	—	—	—	—
1952	"The Isle of Innisfree" (from Themes and Songs from The Quiet Man)	—	—	—	—	3
1952	"Watermelon Weather" (w/ Peggy Lee)	28	—	—	—	—
1952	"Till the End of the World"	16	—	—	10	—
1952	"Zing a Little Zong" (w/ Jane Wyman) (from Selections from the Paramount Picture "Just for You")	18	—	—	—	10
1952	"Silver Bells" (w/ Carol Richards)	20	—	—	—	—
1952	"Keep It a Secret"	28	—	—	—	—
1953	"You Don't Know What Lonesome Is" (from Home on the Range)	23	—	—	—	—
1953	"Open Up Your Heart"	22	—	—	—	—
1953	"Hush-a-bye"	24	—	—	—	—
1953	"White Christmas" (gold record) (see 1942)	21	—	—	—	—
1954	"Changing Partners" (from Bing Sings the Hits)	13	—	—	—	9
1954	"Y'all Come" (from Bing Sings the Hits)	20	—	—	—	—
1954	"Down by the Riverside" (w/ Gary Crosby)	28	—	—	—	—
1954	"Young at Heart"	24	—	—	—	—
1954	"Count Your Blessings Instead of Sheep" (from Selections from Irving Berlin's White Christmas)	27	—	—	—	11
1954	"White Christmas" (gold record) (see 1942) (from Selections from Irving Berlin's White Christmas)	21	—	—	—	—
1955	"Stranger in Paradise" (from Bing Sings the Hits)	—	—	—	—	17
1955	"White Christmas" (gold record) (see 1942)	7	—	—	—	—
1956	"In a Little Spanish Town" (w/ Buddy Cole & his Trio) (from In a Little Spanish Town)	49	—	—	—	22
1956	"True Love" (w/ Grace Kelly) (from High Society)	3	—	—	—	4
1956	"Well, Did You Evah!" (w/ Frank Sinatra) (from High Society)	92	—	—	—	—
1956	"Now You Has Jazz" (w/ Louis Armstrong) (from High Society)	88	—	—	—	—
1956	"White Christmas" (gold record) (see 1942)	65	—	—	—	—
1957	"Around the World" (from Around the World with Bing!)	25	—	—	—	5
1957	"How Lovely Is Christmas" (from A Christmas Story – An Axe, an Apple and a Buckskin Jacket)	97	—	—	—	—
1957	"Silent Night"	54	—	—	—	—
1957	"Silver Bells" (w/ Carol Richards)	78	—	—	—	—
1957	"White Christmas" (gold record) (see 1942)	34	—	—	—	—
1958	"White Christmas" (gold record) (see 1942)	66	—	—	—	—
1959	"White Christmas" (gold record) (see 1942)	59	—	—	—	—
1960	"Adeste Fideles"	45	—	—	—	—
1960	"I'll Be Home for Christmas (If Only in My Dreams)" (gold record)	102	—	—	—	—
1960	"Silent Night"	54	—	—	—	—
1960	"White Christmas" (gold record) (see 1942)	26	—	—	—	—
1961	"White Christmas" (gold record) (see 1942)	12	—	—	—	—
1962	"White Christmas" (gold record) (see 1942)	38	—	—	—	—
1968	"Step to the Rear"	—	—	29	—	—
1975	"That's What Life Is All About" (from That's What Life Is All About)	—	—	35	—	41
1977	"White Christmas" (see 1942)	—	—	—	—	5
1982	"Peace on Earth/Little Drummer Boy" (w/ David Bowie)	—	—	—	—	3
1983	"True Love" (w/ Grace Kelly)	—	—	—	—	70
1985	"White Christmas" (see 1942)	—	—	—	—	69
1998	"White Christmas" (see 1942)	—	—	—	—	29
2018	"White Christmas" (see 1942)	34	—	—	—	61
2019	"White Christmas" (see 1942)	42	—	—	—	31
2020	"White Christmas" (see 1942)	20	—	—	—	49
2020	"Mele Kalikimaka (Merry Christmas)" (w/ The Andrews Sisters)	36	—	—	—	—
2020	"I'll Be Home for Christmas (If Only in My Dreams)"	50	—	—	—	—
2021	"White Christmas" (see 1942)	21	—	—	—	48
2022	"White Christmas" (see 1942)	16	—	—	—	39
2023	"White Christmas" (see 1942)	14	—	—	—	38
2024	"White Christmas" (see 1942)	19	—	—	—	42
2024	"Mele Kalikimaka (Merry Christmas)" (w/ The Andrews Sisters)	—	—	—	—	71
2025	"White Christmas" (see 1942)	16	—	—	—	48
2025	"Mele Kalikimaka (Merry Christmas)" (w/ The Andrews Sisters)	49	—	—	—	—
2025	"I'll Be Home for Christmas (If Only in My Dreams)"	50	—	—	—	—

=== Holiday 100 chart entries ===
Since many radio stations in the US adopt a format change to Christmas music each December, many holiday hits have an annual spike in popularity during the last few weeks of the year and are retired once the season is over. In December 2011, Billboard began a Holiday Songs chart with 50 positions that monitors the last five weeks of each year to "rank the top holiday hits of all eras using the same methodology as the Hot 100, blending streaming, airplay, and sales data", and in 2013 the number of positions on the chart was doubled, resulting in the Holiday 100. Many Crosby recordings have made appearances on the Holiday 100 and are noted below according to the holiday season in which they charted there.

Title	Holiday season peak chart positions															Album
Title	2011	2012	2013	2014	2015	2016	2017	2018	2019	2020	2021	2022	2023	2024	2025	Album
"Adeste Fideles (O Come, All Ye Faithful)"	—	—	—	—	21	—	—	—	—	—	—	—	—	—	—	Merry Christmas
"Do You Hear What I Hear?"	—	—	79	70	38	90	67	70	74	82	70	95	87	76	74	I Wish You a Merry Christmas
"Frosty the Snowman"	—	—	—	—	—	—	—	—	—	—	—	94	89	—	—	I Wish You a Merry Christmas
"I Wish You a Merry Christmas"	—	—	—	—	49	86	—	—	—	—	—	93	92	—	91	I Wish You a Merry Christmas
"I'll Be Home for Christmas"	—	—	—	—	—	—	97	28	37	33	75	82	67	45	45	Merry Christmas
"It's Beginning to Look a Lot Like Christmas" (with Jud Conlon's Rhythmaires) (Note: BPI: Silver)	18	18	30	25	24	22	26	27	31	43	57	47	65	75	67	Merry Christmas
"Let It Snow! Let It Snow! Let It Snow!"	—	—	—	—	—	—	—	—	87	—	—	—	—	—	—	I Wish You a Merry Christmas
"The Little Drummer Boy"	—	—	—	—	—	—	—	46	46	62	81	79	90	89	76	I Wish You a Merry Christmas
"Mele Kalikimaka (Merry Christmas)" (with The Andrews Sisters)	—	—	—	61	87	74	87	73	36	25	56	42	44	39	45	Merry Christmas
"Peace on Earth/Little Drummer Boy" (with David Bowie)	—	—	87	—	—	—	—	—	—	—	—	—	—	—	—	(non-album single)
"Santa Claus Is Coming to Town" (with The Andrews Sisters)	—	—	—	—	—	—	—	90	61	—	—	—	—	—	—	Merry Christmas
"Silent Night"	—	—	—	—	—	—	—	—	88	—	73	76	64	—	—	Merry Christmas
"Silver Bells" (with Carol Richards)	—	—	95	—	—	—	63	—	—	—	—	—	—	—	—	Merry Christmas
"White Christmas"	11	7	7	8	5	12	10	11	16	13	13	13	13	17	15	Merry Christmas
"Winter Wonderland"	—	—	—	—	—	—	—	98	94	86	—	66	74	73	77	I Wish You a Merry Christmas
