= St. Valentine's Day (album) =

Compilation album by Bing Crosby
- Released: 1948 (original 78 album); 1949 (10" LP DL 5039)
- Recorded: 1941–1945
- Genre: Popular
- Length: 23:18
- Label: Decca Records

Bing Crosby chronology
The Emperor Waltz (1948)	St. Valentine's Day (1948)	Bing Crosby Sings with Al Jolson, Bob Hope, Dick Haymes and the Andrews Sisters (1948)

St. Valentine's Day is a 1948 Decca Records compilation album of recordings by Bing Crosby.

== Background ==
Bing Crosby enjoyed unprecedented success during the 1940s, with his output including six No. 1 hits in 1944 alone. His films, such as Going My Way and The Bells of St. Mary's, were huge successes as were the Road films he made with Bob Hope. On radio, his Kraft Music Hall and Philco Radio Time shows were very popular. Decca Records exploited this by issuing a number of 78rpm album sets, some featuring fresh material and others using Crosby's back catalogue. Ten of these sets were released in 1946, nine in 1947 and nine more in 1948. Most of these 78 rpm albums were reissued as 10-inch vinyl LP's in subsequent years.

St. Valentine's Day includes two of Crosby's No. 1 hits from 1944 – "I'll Be Seeing You" and "I Love You" – two other chart entries ("You and I" and "Miss You") plus re-recordings of the singer's first ever recordings for Decca in 1934 "I Love You Truly" and "Just A-Wearyin' for You".

== Reception ==
The album reached No. 8 in the Billboard list of best-selling popular albums in February 1949.

== Track listing ==
These songs were featured on a four 10-inch 78 rpm album set, Decca Album No. A-621.

St. Valentine's Day track listing
Side / Title	Writer(s)	Recording date	Performed with	Time
Disc 1 (23971):
A. "I Love You Truly"	Carrie Jacobs Bond	April 18, 1945	John Scott Trotter and His Orchestra	2:56
B. "Just A-Wearyin' for You"	Carrie Jacobs Bond	April 18, 1945	John Scott Trotter and His Orchestra	3:08
Disc 2 (23482):
A. "The Sweetest Story Ever Told"	R. M. Stults	December 4, 1945	Ethel Smith and The Song Spinners	3:14
B. "Mighty Lak' a Rose"	Frank Lebby Stanton, Ethelbert Nevin	December 4, 1945	Ethel Smith and the Song Spinners	3:19
Disc 3 (24255):
A. "You and I"	Meredith Willson	May 23, 1941	John Scott Trotter and His Orchestra	2:35
B. "Miss You"	Charles Tobias, Harry Tobias, Henry Tobias	January 24, 1942	John Scott Trotter and His Orchestra	2:44
Disc 4 (24256):
A. "I'll Be Seeing You	Sammy Fain, Irving Kahal	February 17, 1944	John Scott Trotter and His Orchestra	2:47
B. "I Love You"	Cole Porter	February 11, 1944	John Scott Trotter and His Orchestra	2:35

== LP release ==
The album was also issued as a 10" vinyl LP in 1949 with the catalogue number DL 5039.

== See also ==
- Valentine's Day
