= Bing Crosby Sings with Judy Garland, Mary Martin, Johnny Mercer =

Compilation album by Bing Crosby, Judy Garland, Mary Martin, Johnny Mercer
- Released: Original 78 album: 1948
- Recorded: 1938–1945
- Genre: Popular
- Length: 27:59
- Label: Decca Records

Bing Crosby chronology
Selections from Road to Rio (w/ The Andrews Sisters) (1948)	Bing Crosby Sings with Judy Garland, Mary Martin, Johnny Mercer (1948)	Bing Crosby Sings with Lionel Hampton, Eddie Heywood, Louis Jordan (1948)

Bing Crosby Sings with Judy Garland, Mary Martin, Johnny Mercer is a Decca Records compilation album of phonograph records by Bing Crosby, Judy Garland, Mary Martin and Johnny Mercer.

== Background ==
Bing Crosby had enjoyed unprecedented success during the 1940s with his discography showing six No. 1 hits in 1944 alone. His films such as Going My Way and The Bells of St. Mary's were huge successes as were the Road films he made with Bob Hope. On radio, his Kraft Music Hall and Philco Radio Time shows were very popular. Decca Records built on this by issuing a number of 78rpm album sets, some featuring freshly recorded material and others utilizing Crosby's back catalogue. Ten of these sets were released in 1946, nine in 1947 and nine more in 1948.

Bing Crosby Sings with Judy Garland, Mary Martin, Johnny Mercer includes several songs which had already been hits – "Small Fry" and "Mr. Gallagher and Mr. Shean" – had charted in 1938 and "Yah-Ta-Ta, Yah-Ta-Ta" reached No. 5 in 1945.

== Reception ==
The reviewer for Billboard said:

Second in series of Decca packages with triple-talent peg featuring der Bingle's former vocal wax compatriots. All disks are former single releases but album as a whole should appeal to all who are Crosby fans (who ain't). Particularly valuable and as rhythmically appealing as when they first came out are the Mercer team-ups with Gallagher-Shean version of "Mr. Crosby and Mr. Mercer"; "Small Fry," "On Behalf of the Visiting Firemen." In fact whole album sparkles with the xairy, wunnerful Crosby touch.

== Track listing ==
These songs were featured on a five-disc 10-inch 78 rpm album set, Decca Album No. A-631.

Side / Title	Writer(s)	Recording date	Performed with	Time
Disc 1 (23410):
A. "Yah-Ta-Ta, Yah-Ta-Ta (Talk, Talk, Talk)"	Johnny Burke, Jimmy Van Heusen	March 9, 1945	Judy Garland and Joseph J. Lilley and His Orchestra	3:06
B. "You've Got Me Where You Want Me"	Johnny Mercer, Harry Warren	July 31, 1944	Judy Garland and Joseph J. Lilley and His Orchestra	2:51
Disc 2 (23804):
A. "Connecticut"	Hugh Martin, Ralph Blane	March 9, 1945	Judy Garland and Joseph J. Lilley and His Orchestra	3:09
B. "Mine"	George Gershwin, Ira Gershwin	July 31, 1944	Judy Garland and Joseph J. Lilley and His Orchestra	2:45
Disc 3 (25091):
A. "Wait 'Till the Sun Shines, Nellie"	Harry Von Tilzer, Andrew B. Sterling	March 13, 1942	Mary Martin and John Scott Trotter and His Orchestra	2:32
B. "Lily of Laguna"	Leslie Stuart	March 13, 1942	Mary Martin and John Scott Trotter and His Orchestra	2:28
Disc 4 (25148):
A. "On Behalf of the Visiting Firemen"	Johnny Mercer, Walter Donaldson	April 15, 1940	Johnny Mercer and Victor Young and His Orchestra	2:27
B. "Mr. Meadowlark"	Johnny Mercer, Walter Donaldson	April 15, 1940	Johnny Mercer and Victor Young and His Orchestra	2:40
Disc 5 (24293):
A. "Small Fry"	Frank Loesser, Hoagy Carmichael	July 1, 1938	Johnny Mercer and Victor Young's Small Fryers	3:06
B. "Mr. Gallagher and Mr. Shean"	Ed Gallagher, Al Shean	July 1, 1938	Johnny Mercer and Victor Young's Small Fryers	2:55
