= Under Western Skies =

Under Western Skies may refer to:

- Under Western Skies (1945 film), an American musical western film
- Under Western Skies (1926 film), an American silent western film
- Under Western Skies (album), a 1941 Bing Crosby album
