= Road to Utopia (disambiguation) =

Road to Utopia is a 1946 musical comedy film.

Road to Utopia may also refer to:

- Selections from Road to Utopia, a 1946 studio album by Bing Crosby released in association with the film
- Road to Utopia (album), a 2018 space-rock album by Hawkwind
- Dystopia: Road to Utopia, a 2021 EP released by girl group Dreamcatcher
