= Bing Crosby Sings with Al Jolson, Bob Hope, Dick Haymes and the Andrews Sisters =

Compilation album by Bing Crosby
- Released: 1948
- Recorded: 1944, 1947
- Genre: Popular
- Length: 16:30
- Label: Decca Records

Bing Crosby chronology
St. Valentine's Day (1948)	Bing Crosby Sings with Al Jolson, Bob Hope, Dick Haymes and the Andrews Sisters (1948)	Selections from Road to Rio (w/ The Andrews Sisters) (1948)

Bing Crosby Sings with Al Jolson, Bob Hope, Dick Haymes and the Andrews Sisters is a Bing Crosby Decca Records studio 78 rpm album of phonograph records featuring Crosby with several of Decca's top artists.

== Background ==
Bing Crosby had enjoyed unprecedented success during the 1940s with his discography showing six No. 1 hits in 1944 alone. His films such as Going My Way and The Bells of St. Mary's were huge successes as were the Road films he made with Bob Hope. On radio, his Kraft Music Hall and Philco Radio Time shows were very popular. Decca Records built on this by issuing a number of 78rpm album sets, some featuring freshly recorded material and others utilizing Crosby's back catalog. Ten of these sets were released in 1946, nine in 1947 and ten more in 1948.

Bing Crosby Sings with Al Jolson, Bob Hope, Dick Haymes and the Andrews Sisters includes several songs which had already enjoyed chart success – "Road to Morocco", "Alexander's Ragtime Band" and "There's No Business Like Show Business".

== Reception ==
Billboard had reviewed the songs as they were issued as singles with mixed results:

Put It There, Pal – Road to Morocco
From the standpoint of merchandise, there is mucho mucho in the mating of Bing Crosby and Bob Hope to introduce the label's new Specialty Series. But as much as one must admire the artistry of both gents in their respective fields, neither Bing nor Bob give a fair sample of their talents in this spinning. As a matter of fact, it's a case where singer Bing tries to turn comic and funny man Hope casts himself as a singer. The net result is a nonentity. Were it not for the names involved, it can all pass off as a home-spun ham on the part of a pair of parlor wits. Crosby and Hope merely have a session of synthetic fun, leaving the listener to wonder what it is all about. Even with the song material, it's much ado over nothing. Both selections are of the novelty genre, scooped up skimpishly by Jimmy Van Heusen and Johnny Burke for movie scores. "Put It There, Pal" is a feeble attempt to create a "Mr. Gallagher and Mr. Shean" pattern. But it never does. "Road to Morocco" displays even less ingenuity as song material for such a high-powered pair. Hope, who needs more expanse than what a confiding platter can afford, signs off with an under-breath murmur—"We can be arrested!" And he ain't kidding, bub! Vic Schoen's musical beats, keeping the spinning bright, should help to bring in some nickels strictly on the novelty strength of the pair of big names involved in this needling.

There's No Business Like Show Business – Anything You Can Do, I Can Do Better
Take two Irving Berlin favorites from an "Annie, Get Your Gun" legiter, give them to Bing Crosby to record, or Dick Haymes or Andrews Sisters—or, hey, wait a minute, give'm to all three and don't you wish you could buy shares of Decca stock. It's a buck platter, we know, but triple talent such as this on one black biscuit won't do until the next thing comes along. Great material…Great recording…should go over solid.

Alexander's Ragtime Band – The Spaniard That Blighted My Life
Bing Crosby and Al Jolson with Morris Stoloff's Ork Decca 40038 It takes no genius to tout the "greatest." But if this pairing by Crosby-Jolson doesn't plough little aisles all over the country for people to lay in, then there are no prophets. Casey didn't strike out and the atom bomb won't work. Without boring you with details, it's simply colossal. Crosby and Jolson (in the same easy informality that has Hooperocketed Bing's Philco show) do two American favorites with charm, humor, grace and, leave us face it, class. With "Alexander" benefiting from exploitation of the same-titled Fox pic revival; with "The Spaniard" a natural for the mass audience that loves it when Bing and Al clown it up, there's no more question. Decca's Jack Kapp can take a fast bow and run for cover before the orders swamp him under.

== Track listing ==
These songs were featured on a three-disc, 78 rpm album set, Decca Album No. A-628.

Side / Title	Writer(s)	Recording date	Performed with	Time
Disc 1 (40039):
A. "Anything You Can Do"	Irving Berlin	March 19, 1947	Dick Haymes, The Andrews Sisters and Vic Schoen and his Orchestra.	3:00
B. "There's No Business Like Show Business"	Irving Berlin	March 19, 1947	Dick Haymes, The Andrews Sisters and Vic Schoen and his Orchestra	2:51
Disc 2 (40000):
A. "Put It There, Pal"	Jimmy Van Heusen, Johnny Burke	December 8, 1944	Bob Hope and Vic Schoen and his Orchestra	2:21
B. "Road to Morocco"	Jimmy Van Heusen, Johnny Burke	December 8, 1944	Bob Hope and Vic Schoen and his Orchestra	2:33
Disc 3 (40038):
A. "Alexander's Ragtime Band"	Irving Berlin	March 25, 1947	Al Jolson and Morris Stoloff and His Orchestra	2:47
B. "The Spaniard That Blighted My Life"	Billy Merson	March 25, 1947	Al Jolson and Morris Stoloff and His Orchestra	2:58
