= Auld Lang Syne (Bing Crosby album) =

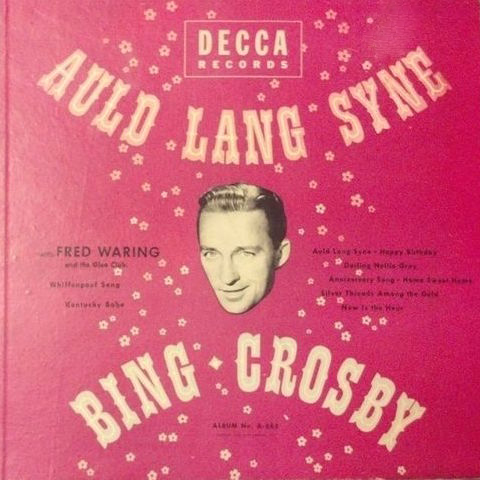

Compilation album by Bing Crosby
- Released: Original 78 rpm album: 1948; 10" LP album: 1949; 45 rpm album: 1950
- Recorded: 1938, 1945, 1947
- Genre: Popular
- Length: 24:14
- Label: Decca

Bing Crosby chronology
Cowboy Songs, Vol. Two (1948)	''Auld Lang Syne'' (1948)	Bing Crosby Sings Cole Porter Songs (1949)

Auld Lang Syne is a compilation album of phonograph records by Bing Crosby released in 1948 featuring songs that were sung by Crosby and also by Fred Waring and his Glee Club. The songs were later presented in 33 1/3 rpm and 45 rpm sets, respectively. This set featured many of Bing's great hits such as: Silver Threads Among the Gold and Now Is the Hour.

== Background ==
Bing Crosby had enjoyed unprecedented success during the 1940s with his discography showing six No. 1 hits in 1944 alone. His films such as Going My Way and The Bells of St. Mary's were huge successes as were the Road films he made with Bob Hope. On radio, his Kraft Music Hall and Philco Radio Time shows were very popular. Decca Records built on this by issuing a number of 78rpm album sets, some featuring freshly recorded material and others utilizing Crosby's back catalogue. Ten of these sets were released in 1946, nine in 1947 and twelve more in 1948.

== Reception ==
Billboard commented:

This, the 12th Decca album of Crosby, shows Bing at his sober sentimental best, doing tunes selected for sacrosanct dignity and hallowed usage. Most of the sides have had field days as singles, but their group character is reasonably certain to insure the package of a wide sale. It’s a family album, with interest for almost anyone who buys pop music, gaffers and youngsters alike. Bing is especially mellow on the quality standards, “Whiffenpoof,” “Babe” and “Nellie,” and plenty good enough on the rest.

== Track listing ==
These previously issued songs were featured on a 4-disc, 78 rpm album set, Decca Album No. A-663.

Side	Title	Recording date	Writer	Performed with	Time
Disc 1 (23273):
A.	"Happy Birthday", "Auld Lang Syne"	March 28, 1947	Traditional	Victor Young and His Orchestra and the Ken Darby Singers	3:04
B.	"Anniversary Song"	March 28, 1947	Al Jolson, Saul Chaplin, Ion Ivanovici	Victor Young and His Orchestra and the Ken Darby Singers	3:12
Disc 2 (23990):
A.	"Whiffenpoof Song"	June 4, 1947	Rudyard Kipling, Guy H. Scull, Meade Minnigerode, George S. Pomeroy	Fred Waring and the Glee Club	3:00
B.	"Kentucky Babe"	June 4, 1947	Adam Geibel, Richard Henry Buck	Fred Waring and the Glee Club	3:15
Disc 3 (24279):
A.	"Now Is the Hour"	November 8, 1947	Clement Scott, Maewa Kaihau, Dorothy Stewart	The Ken Darby Singers	3:01
B.	"Silver Threads Among the Gold"	November 8, 1947	Eben E. Rexford, Hart Pease Danks	The Ken Darby Singers	2:51
Disc 4 (24203):
A.	"Home Sweet Home"	July 30, 1945	John Howard Payne, Henry Bishop	Victor Young and His Orchestra	2:50
B.	"Darling Nellie Gray"	April 25, 1938	Benjamin Hanby	The Paul Taylor Choir	3:01

== Other releases ==
The album with all of the same selections was transferred to a 10" LP in 1949 with the catalog number DL 5028. The set was also released in 1950 on four 45 rpm discs on a set numbered 9-119.
