= Jack Halloran =

American composer and choral director (1916–1997)

- Born: John Thomas Halloran; January 10, 1916; Rock Rapids, Iowa, US
- Died: January 24, 1997 (aged 81) Lancaster, California, US
- Spouse: Ella Wright

Jack Halloran (January 10, 1916 – January 24, 1997) was an American composer and choral director.

== Biography ==
=== Early life ===
John Thomas "Jack" Halloran was born in Rock Rapids, Iowa on January 10, 1916. Halloran earned degrees in music from Morningside College in Sioux City, Iowa, and Northwestern University in Evanston, Illinois.

=== Choral and pop culture involvement ===
Halloran sang with a male quartet called the Cadets on several Chicago-based radio shows, including Don McNeill's Breakfast Club. He later formed the Jack Halloran Quartet, which appeared on the television programs Garroway at Large and The Pat Buttram Show. Relocating to Hollywood, Halloran became a choral director for films, records, and television, working with such entertainers as Roy Rogers, Pat Boone, Ray Charles, Frank Sinatra, and Dean Martin. He landed the job of choral director and arranger on The Dean Martin Show while working with the singer on his recording of "Volare." Halloran also organized the Jack Halloran Singers, which performed throughout Southern California.

In 1957, Halloran arranged and recorded the current version of the now-popular Christmas song "The Little Drummer Boy" (then titled "Carol of the Drum") for the Dot Records album Christmas Is A-Comin'. However, the recording was not released as a single that year. In response to this, Dot producer Henry Onorati, who left Dot to become the new head of 20th Century Fox Records in 1958, introduced the song to Harry Simeone. When 20th Century Fox Records contracted with Simeone to make a Christmas album, Simeone hired many of the same singers that had sung in Halloran's version and made a near-identical recording with his newly-created Harry Simeone Chorale. It was released as a single in 1958, and later on the album Sing We Now of Christmas. This version became very successful, and has since become a popular Christmas song. The only difference between Simeone's version and Halloran's version was that Simeone's contained finger cymbals and had been retitled "The Little Drummer Boy". Simeone and Onorati claimed and received joint composition credits along with Katherine Kennicott Davis, although the two did not actually compose, write, or arrange it. Halloran never received a writing credit for the song, something his family disagrees with. The song has since been covered by hundreds of artists, including multiple re-recordings by Simeone.

Halloran directed the orchestra and chorus for Bing Crosby's 1959 LP Join Bing and Sing Along. He directed the chorus for Crosby's 1962 albums On the Happy Side and I Wish You a Merry Christmas, and his 1971 album A Time to Be Jolly. He was also a member of the Ray Conniff Singers, appearing on such albums as Speak to Me of Love (Columbia, 1963).

Halloran was also a former local president of the American Federation of Television and Radio Artists.

=== Later life and death ===
In the mid-1980s, Halloran taught sight-singing and group harmony classes for vocalists at the Dick Grove School of Music in Southern California.

Halloran died of a stroke in Lancaster, California, on January 24, 1997, at the age of 81. His wife Ella Rose Halloran (née Wright; born 1920) died in 1998. The couple were buried together at Mount Hope Greeley Township Cemetery in Mount Hope, Kansas.

== Arrangements and compositions ==
- America the Beautiful
- Camptown Races
- Christmas Is a Comin'
- Little David, Play on Your Harp
- Nelly Bly
- Pat-A-Pan (Burgundian carol)
- Witness

=== Witness ===
Witness (1986) was first released in an a cappella setting for 8-part mixed voices, and within months had sold over 30,000 copies. The following year it topped 50,000 and continued to climb. It remains a top seller and an industry standard. Veteran arranger Dick Bolks has revoiced and edited Halloran's setting into an SATB edition with optional accompaniment.
