= Small Fry (album) =

Small Fry: A Collection of Songs About Small Fry
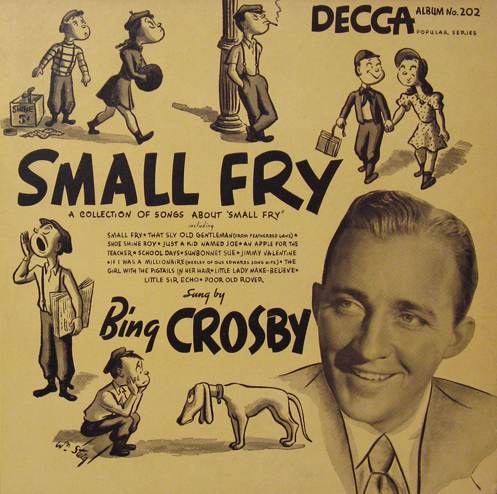

Compilation album by Bing Crosby
- Released: Original 78 album: 1941
- Recorded: 1936, 1938, 1939, 1940
- Genre: Popular
- Length: 30:09
- Label: Decca

Bing Crosby chronology
Hawaii Calls (1941)	Small Fry: A Collection of Songs About Small Fry (1941)	Crosbyana (1941)

Small Fry is a compilation album of phonograph records by Bing Crosby released in 1941 featuring songs centered on the main song, "Small Fry", which was sung by Bing Crosby in the 1938 film Sing You Sinners.

== Track listing ==
These previously issued songs were featured on a 5-disc, 78 rpm album set, Decca Album No. 202.

Side / Title	Writer(s)	Recording date	Performed with	Time
Disc 1 (3600):
A. "Small Fry"	Frank Loesser, Hoagy Carmichael	July 1, 1938	Johnny Mercer and Victor Young's Small Fryers	3:06
B. "That Sly Old Gentleman"	Johnny Burke, James V. Monaco	March 10, 1939	John Scott Trotter and His Orchestra	3:01
Disc 2 (3601):
A. "Shoe Shine Boy"	Sammy Cahn, Saul Chaplin	August 4, 1936	Jimmy Dorsey and His Orchestra	3:03
B. "Just a Kid Named Joe"	Mack David, Jerry Livingston	December 19, 1938	John Scott Trotter and His Orchestra	3:06
Disc 3 (3602):
A. "An Apple for the Teacher"	Johnny Burke, James V. Monaco	June 22, 1939	Connee Boswell	3:03
B. Medley: "School Days", "Sunbonnet Sue", "Jimmy Valentine" "If I Was a Millionaire"	Will D. Cobb, Gus Edwards; Will D. Cobb, Gus Edwards; Edward Madden, Gus Edwards; Will D. Cobb, Gus Edwards	June 30, 1939	the Music Maids and John Scott Trotter and His Orchestra	3:10
Disc 4 (3603):
A. "The Girl with the Pigtails in Her Hair"	Sammy Cahn, Saul Chapin	February 9, 1940	John Scott Trotter and His Orchestra	2:35
B. "Little Lady Make Believe"	Harry Tobias, Nat Simons	April 25, 1938	Eddie Dunstedter	3:15
Disc 5 (2385):
A. "Little Sir Echo"	Laura R. Smith, J. S. Frears	March 31, 1939	the Music Maids and John Scott Trotter and His Orchestra	2:42
B. "Poor Old Rover"	Del Porter, Ray Johnson	March 10, 1939	The Foursome and John Scott Trotter's Frying Pan Five	3:08
