= Bing Crosby Sings the Song Hits from Broadway Shows =

Compilation album by Bing Crosby, Trudy Erwin
- Released: 1948
- Recorded: 1943–1946
- Genre: Popular
- Length: 23:53
- Label: Decca

Bing Crosby chronology
Bing Crosby Sings with Lionel Hampton, Eddie Heywood, Louis Jordan (1948)	Bing Crosby Sings the Song Hits from Broadway Shows (1948)	Cowboy Songs, Vol. Two (1948)

Bing Crosby Sings the Song Hits from Broadway Shows is a Decca Records compilation 78 rpm album of phonograph records by Bing Crosby featuring some of the hits from Broadway musicals.

== Background ==
Bing Crosby had enjoyed unprecedented success during the 1940s with his discography showing six No. 1 hits in 1944 alone. His films such as Going My Way and The Bells of St. Mary's were huge successes as were the Road films he made with Bob Hope. On radio, his Kraft Music Hall and Philco Radio Time shows were very popular. Decca Records built on this by issuing a number of 78rpm album sets, some featuring freshly recorded material and others utilizing Crosby's back catalogue. Ten of these sets were released in 1946, nine in 1947 and eleven more in 1948.
Bing Crosby Sings the Song Hits from Broadway Shows includes several songs which had already enjoyed chart success. The duets with Trudy Erwin, which were recorded during the musicians’ strike, were huge hits in 1943 and “If I Loved You”, "Evelina" and “They Say It’s Wonderful” enjoyed chart success too.

== Reception ==
Billboard reviewed some of the songs when they were first issued as singles.

People Will Say We’re in Love—Oh! What a Beautiful Morning
For sheer vocal beauty and charm, the blended talents of Bing Crosby, Trudy Erwin and the Sportsmen Glee Club make for a real pleasantry on the platters. With the added comfort of two of the top tunes from the smash Oklahoma! musical hit as the vehicle, it adds up to the most ear-caressing of all-vocal recordings to come forth this year. Crosby, sharing the lyrical expressions with Miss Erwin, and with the Glee Club weaving a rhythmic and harmonic background, the interpretation approximates downright purring, it being that purty. Taken at a moderate tempo, and with sustained harmonies of the glee club setting the stage, the boy-belle team of romancing singers split the opening chorus. The glee club gets a second stanza underway and then Crosby jumps to the words of the bridge with Miss Erwin joining him in duet to complete the chorus and carry out the side with an ear-tingling vocal reprise. Unquestionably one of the more beautiful waltz melodies of this day is the lilting 16-bar lullaby for Oh! What a Beautiful Morning. Taking it at a bright and breezy three-quarter tempo, Crosby and company make the morning sound all the more beautiful in song. Sharing wordage with Miss Erwin, whose vocal talents are in high order, the boy-belle team start right off with verse and chorus, followed by a second set of verse lyrics and chorus. The glee club carries a chorus on their own and the two lead voices return for a third verse and chorus. Already going strong in the music boxes with “People Will Say We’re in Love”, it’s a certainty that the disk is going to serve double duty for the operators, with “Oh! What a Beautiful Morning” proving just as strong.

Evelina – The Eagle and Me
In his most persuasive style, Bing Crosby sells it like a million for these two hit ballads from the “Bloomer Girl” stage smash. Spinning drips with magnolias and honeysuckle juice as Crosby chants the “Evelina” love ballad, with pizzicato fiddles creating the flavor of a banjo to accompany the singer. For “The Eagle and Me,” Crosby starts off with the verse, taking liberty with the tempo and then hits into a moderate rhythm tempo for the chorus. A mixed choir breaks in on the second stanza to add vocal force to his singing. Crosby brings out all the emotional appeal of this freedom song, and for both sides, gets excellent musical support from the large studio band directed by Toots Camarata. Both of these show tunes are bound to skyrocket on the strength of Bing Crosby’s song selling, and both sides should bring in a bumper crop of coins for the music ops.

== Track listing ==
These songs were featured on a four-disc, 78 rpm album set, Decca Album No. A-648.

Side / Title	Broadway Show	Writer(s)	Recording date	Performed with	Time
Disc 1 (18364):
A. "People Will Say We're in Love"	Oklahoma!	Rodgers and Hammerstein	August 23, 1943	Trudy Erwin and The Sportsmen Glee Club	2:55
B. "Oh, What a Beautiful Mornin'"	Oklahoma!	Rodgers and Hammerstein	August 23, 1943	Trudy Erwin and The Sportsmen Glee Club	2:46
Disc 2 (18686):
A. "If I Loved You"	Carousel	Rodgers and Hammerstein	April 18, 1945	John Scott Trotter and his Orchestra	2:56
B. "Close As Pages in a Book"	Up in Central Park	Romberg, Fields	April 18, 1945	John Scott Trotter and his Orchestra.	3:06
Disc 3 (18846):
A. "They Say It's Wonderful"	Annie Get Your Gun	Berlin	January 22, 1946	Jay Blackton and His Orchestra	3:00
B. "I Love You"	Song of Norway	Forrest, Wright	December 15, 1944	John Scott Trotter and his Orchestra	3:00
Disc 4 (18635):
A. "Evelina"	Bloomer Girl	Arlen, Harburg	October 13, 1944	Camarata and His Orchestra	2:58
B. "The Eagle and Me"	Bloomer Girl	Arlen, Harburg	October 13, 1944	Camarata and His Orchestra	3:12

== LP release ==
The album was also issued by Decca as a 10-inch vinyl long-playing record in 1949 with catalog number DL 5000.

== 45 rpm release ==
A 4-disc 45 rpm album was also released with the catalog number 9-117.
