= Bing Crosby Sings with Lionel Hampton, Eddie Heywood, Louis Jordan =

Compilation album by Bing Crosby, Lionel Hampton, Eddie Heywood and Louis Jordan
- Released: Original 78 album: 1948
- Recorded: 1944, 1945, 1946
- Genre: Popular
- Length: 23:22
- Label: Decca Records

Bing Crosby chronology
Bing Crosby Sings with Judy Garland, Mary Martin, Johnny Mercer (1948)	Bing Crosby Sings with Lionel Hampton, Eddie Heywood, Louis Jordan (1948)	Bing Crosby Sings the Song Hits from Broadway Shows (1948)

Bing Crosby Sings with Lionel Hampton, Eddie Heywood, Louis Jordan is a Decca Records compilation album of phonograph records by Bing Crosby, Lionel Hampton, Eddie Heywood and Louis Jordan.

== Background ==
Bing Crosby had enjoyed unprecedented success during the 1940s with his discography showing six No. 1 hits in 1944 alone. His films such as Going My Way and The Bells of St. Mary's were huge successes as were the Road films he made with Bob Hope. On radio, his Kraft Music Hall and Philco Radio Time shows were very popular. Decca Records built on this by issuing a number of 78rpm album sets, some featuring freshly recorded material and others utilizing Crosby's back catalogue. Ten of these sets were released in 1946, nine in 1947 and nine more in 1948. Most of these 78 rpm albums were reissued as 10-inch vinyl LPs in subsequent years.

Bing Crosby Sings with Lionel Hampton, Eddie Heywood, Louis Jordan includes only one song which had already been a hit and this was "(Yip Yip De Hootie) My Baby Said Yes" but the album was notable for the accompaniment from several jazz greats.

== Reception ==
The reviewer for Billboard said:

This album would be worth a 90 rating but Decca's pressings, leave us face it, are loaded with surface noise. This deficiency, seemingly aggravated of late, may be minor for routine "singles"; in an album the consumer kickbacks could be important. Apart from bad surface, the material here consists of all old Bing singles on which he doubled. It's great stuff in collection. Outstanding are the Eddie Heywood-Bing pairing on "Who's Sorry Now" and Bing with Jordan on "My Baby Said Yes". (Retail rating 85).

== Track listing ==
The songs were featured on a four 10-inch 78 rpm album set, Decca Album No. A-634.

Side / Title	Writer(s)	Recording date	Performed with	Time
Disc 1 (23843):
A. "On the Sunny Side of the Street"	Jimmy McHugh, Dorothy Fields	January 21, 1946	Lionel Hampton and His Orchestra	2:44
B. "Pinetop's Boogie Woogie"	Pinetop Smith	January 21, 1946	Lionel Hampton and His Orchestra	3:09
Disc 2 (23530):
A. "Who's Sorry Now?"	Ted Snyder, Bert Kalmar, Harry Ruby	September 5, 1945	Eddie Heywood and His Orchestra	2:40
B. "I've Found a New Baby"	Jack Palmer, Spencer Williams	September 5, 1945	Eddie Heywood and His Orchestra	2:48
Disc 3 (23636):
A. "That Little Dream Got Nowhere"	Jimmy Van Heusen, Johnny Burke	August 17, 1945	Eddie Heywood (piano) and rhythm accompaniment	3:11
B. "Baby Won't You Please Come Home"	Charles Warfield, Clarence Williams	August 9, 1945	Eddie Heywood and His Orchestra	3:02
Disc 4 (23417):
A. "(Yip Yip De Hootie) My Baby Said Yes"	Teddy Walters, Sid Robin	July 26, 1944	Louis Jordan and His Tympany Five	2:51
B. "Your Socks Don't Match"	Leon Carr, Leo Corday	July 26, 1944	Louis Jordan and His Tympany Five	2:57
