= Selections from Road to Rio =

Selections from the Paramount Picture Road to Rio
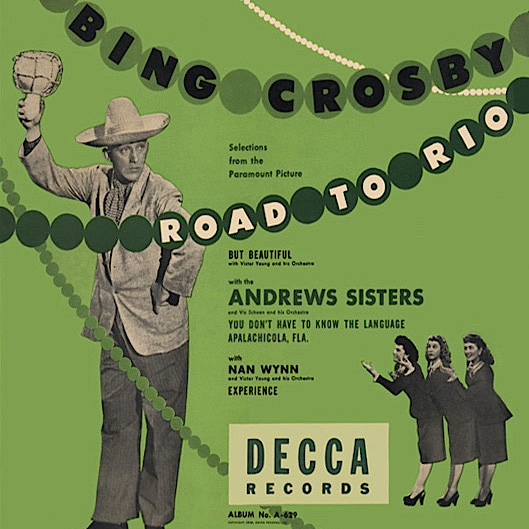

Studio album by Bing Crosby, The Andrews Sisters
- Released: Original 78 album: 1948
- Recorded: 1947
- Genre: Popular
- Label: Decca Records

Bing Crosby chronology
Bing Crosby Sings with Al Jolson, Bob Hope, Dick Haymes and the Andrews Sisters (1948)	Selections from the Paramount Picture Road to Rio (1948)	Bing Crosby Sings with Judy Garland, Mary Martin, Johnny Mercer (1948)

Andrews Sisters chronology
A Collection of Tropical Songs (1947)	Road to Rio (1948)	Go West Young Man (1950)

Selections from Road to Rio is a studio album of phonograph records by Bing Crosby and The Andrews Sisters. It was released in 1948. It features songs that were presented in the American comedy film Road to Rio.

== Reception ==
Billboard reviewed it saying:

Two disk album featuring three novelty tunes and one ballad from the latest Crosby-Hope flicker, Road to Rio, is directly aimed at the film fan market, with release date timed to coincide with national showing of pic. Previously out as single platters, all four tunes enjoyed some success with Crosby's "But Beautiful" ballad easily taking top honors. Bing's "Language" with the Andrews Sisters will probably gain new popularity once public ganders gals and the groaner sell it on the screen.

== Original track listing ==
These recently issued songs were featured on a 2-disc, 78 rpm album set, Decca Album No. A-629. Bing Crosby is on both discs and the Andrews Sisters are on Disc 1. All of the songs were written by Jimmy Van Heusen (music) and Johnny Burke (lyrics).

Side / Title	Recording date	Performed with	Time
Disc 1 (24282):
A. "You Don't Have to Know the Language"	November 25, 1947	Vic Schoen and His Orchestra	2:55
B. "Apalachicola, Fla"	November 25, 1947	Vic Schoen and His Orchestra	2:53
Disc 2 (24294):
A. "But Beautiful"	November 13, 1947	Victor Young and His Orchestra	2:38
B. "Experience"	November 13, 1947	Nan Wynn and Victor Young and His Orchestra	2:38
