= Hawaii Calls (album) =

Hawaii Calls: A Group of Popular Hawaiian Songs
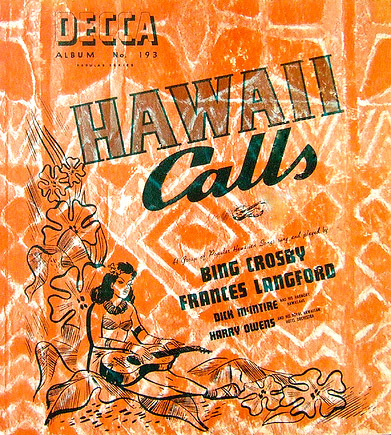

Compilation album by Bing Crosby, Frances Langford, Harry Owens, Dick McIntire
- Released: Original 78 album: 1941
- Recorded: 1937, 1940
- Genre: Popular, Hawaiian
- Label: Decca

Bing Crosby chronology
| Star Dust (1940) | Hawaii Calls: A Group of Popular Hawaiian Songs (1941) | Small Fry (1941) |

Hawaii Calls is a compilation album of phonograph records put together by Decca Records in 1941 featuring Decca's best Hawaiian music. These previously issued songs were featured on a 5-disc, 78 rpm album set, Decca Album No. 193. Harry Owens is the main performer for Disc 1, as Bing Crosby is for Disc 2 and Frances Langford backed by Dick McIntire are for Discs 3 and 4, while Dick McIntire is the main performer for Disc 5.

== Track listing ==
Disc 1: (1265)

1. "King's Serenade", recorded April 17, 1937 with His Hawaiians
2. "Hawaii Calls", recorded April 17, 1937 with His Hawaiians

Disc 2: (3299)

3. "A Song of Old Hawaii", recorded July 1, 1940 with Dick McIntire and His Harmony Hawaiians
4. "Trade Winds", recorded July 1, 1940 with Dick McIntire and His Harmony Hawaiians

Disc 3: (3046)

5. "When Hilo Hattie Does The Hilo Hop", recorded February 19, 1940 with Dick McIntire and His Harmony Hawaiians
6. "Kuu Ipo", recorded February 19, 1940 with Dick McIntire and His Harmony Hawaiians

Disc 4: (3047)

7. "Manuela Boy", recorded February 19, 1940 with Dick McIntire and His Harmony Hawaiians
8. "Moonlight Over Molokai", recorded February 19, 1940 with Dick McIntire and His Harmony Hawaiians

Disc 5: (3048)

7. "Lovely Hula Hands", recorded February 19, 1940
8. "May Day Is Lei Day In Hawaii", recorded February 19, 1940
