= Drifting and Dreaming (album) =

1947 album

Compilation album by Bing Crosby
- Released: 1947 (original 78 rpm album); 1949 (original LP album); 1950 (original 45 rpm album); 1956 (re-release LP album)
- Recorded: 1940, 1942, 1945, 1947
- Genre: Popular
- Length: 24:18 (original release); 35:41 (re-release)
- Label: Decca

Bing Crosby chronology
The Man Without a Country (1947)	Drifting and Dreaming (1947)	Blue of the Night (1948)

Drifting and Dreaming is the compilation album of phonograph records by American singer and actor Bing Crosby with a South Sea Islands flavour. It is one of less than 10 Bing Crosby albums to be featured on all three speeds (LP, 45 rpm and 78 rpm).

== Track listing ==
=== Original release ===
These songs were featured on a four-disc, 78 rpm album set, Decca Album No. A-578.

Disc 1 (25185):
A. "Drifting and Dreaming"
B. "It's Been a Long, Long Time"
Disc 2 (25186):
A. "Where the Blue of the Night (Meets the Gold of the Day)
B. "The Waltz You Saved for Me"
Disc 3 (25187):
A. "When You're a Long, Long Way from Home"
B. "When I Lost You"
Disc 4 (25188):
A. "I'm Drifting Back to Dreamland"
B. "The Singing Sands of Alamosa"

=== Other releases ===
The album was also issued as a 10-inch vinyl LP in 1949 with the catalogue number DL 5119.

In 1950, the album was issued as a set of four 7-inch vinyl 45 rpm discs (catalogue No. 9-113).

A further LP release took place in 1956 when a 12-inch album was released with the title "Drifting and Dreaming" (DL 8268). This took the original eight sides and added four more.

=== Track listing of 12-inch LP ===
Recording dates follow song titles.

Side one
No.	Title	Writer(s)	Performed with	Length
1.	"Drifting and Dreaming" (February 13, 1947)	Haven Gillespie, Loyal Curtis, Edwin R Schmidt, Egbert van Alstyne	Les Paul and his Trio	2:57
2.	"It's Been a Long, Long Time" (July 12, 1945)	Jule Styne, Sammy Cahn	Les Paul and his Trio	2:54
3.	"Where the Blue of the Night (Meets the Gold of the Day)" (July 20, 1940)	Roy Turk, Fred E Ahlert, Bing Crosby	The Paradise Island Trio	2:59
4.	"The Waltz You Saved for Me" (July 20, 1940)	Wayne King, Emil Flindt, Gus Kahn	The Paradise Island Trio	3:16
5.	"When You're a Long, Long Way from Home" (July 20, 1940)	George W. Meyer, Sam M. Lewis	The Paradise Island Trio	3:08
6.	"When I Lost You" (July 20, 1940)	Irving Berlin	The Paradise Island Trio	3:09

Side two
No.	Title	Writer(s)	Performed with	Length
1.	"Beyond the Reef" (September 5, 1950)	Jack Pitman	Lyn Murray and His Orchestra	2:54
2.	"Here Ends the Rainbow (I Found My Love)" (February 9, 1951)	Charles E. King, Johnny Burke	Betty Mullin and Lyn Murray and His Orchestra	2:51
3.	"Sail Along, Silv'ry Moon" (September 11, 1937)	Percy Wenrich, Harry Tobias	Lani McIntire and His Hawaiians	2:44
4.	"My Isle of Golden Dreams" (June 13, 1939)	Walter Blaufuss, Gus Kahn	Dick McIntire and His Harmony Hawaiians	2:54
5.	"The Singing Sands of Alamosa" (January 19, 1942)	Bert Reisfeld, Kim Gannon	Dick McIntire and His Harmony Hawaiians	3:08
6.	"I'm Drifting Back to Dreamland" (January 19, 1942)	Charles F. Harrison, Jack Sadler, Florence Charlesworth	Dick McIntire and His Harmony Hawaiians	2:47
