= On the Happy Side =

Studio album by Bing Crosby
- Released: 1962
- Recorded: April 30, 1962 (vocals)
- Studios: United Recording, Hollywood (vocals)
- Genre: Vocal pop
- Length: 36:32
- Label: Warner Bros.

Bing Crosby chronology
Bing's Hollywood (set of 15 albums) (1962)	On the Happy Side (1962)	I Wish You a Merry Christmas (1962)

On the Happy Side is the twenty-ninth solo studio album by American singer and actor Bing Crosby for his own company, Project Records, and issued by Warner Bros. Records (W1482) in 1962. The album is in a “sing along” style and Crosby over-dubbed his vocals on accompaniment recorded in London earlier in April 1962. The musical arrangements were by Bob Thompson, Jack Halloran, and Peter Matz. The album was issued on CD for the first time in 2017 by Sepia Records.

== Reception ==
Professional ratings
Review scores
Source	Rating
New Record Mirror	4/5 stars

Billboard said: “This is one of Bing’s best albums in some time. He sings a collection of old favorites in straight style, aided by good ork arrangements…Good songs, well sung, and plenty of time, should help this set sell."

== Track listing ==
Side one
No.	Title	Writer(s)	Length
1.	"Singin' in the Rain" / Darktown Strutters' Ball"	Arthur Freed, Nacio Herb Brown / Sheldon Brooks	3:06
2.	"My Little Grass Shack in Kealakekua, Hawaii" / "Around Her Neck She Wore a Yellow Ribbon"	Tommy Harrison, Bill Cogswell, Johnny Noble / George A. Norton	3:12
3.	"Me and My Shadow"	Al Jolson, Billy Rose, Dave Dreyer	2:56
4.	"Five Foot Two, Eyes of Blue" / "Marching Along Together"	Ray Henderson, Sam M. Lewis, Joseph Widow Young / Franz Steininger / Eddie Pola	3:33
5.	"Should I? (Reveal Exactly How I Feel) / "Blue Moon”"	Nacio Herb Brown / Arthur Freed) / Richard Rodgers, Lorenz Hart	3:22
6.	"Cecilia"	Dave Dryer, Harry Ruby	2:51
Total length:			19:00

Side two
No.	Title	Writer(s)	Length
1.	"Gimme a Little Kiss (Will Ya, Huh?) / "When the Red, Red Robin (Comes Bob, Bob, Bobbin' Along)"	Maceo Pinkard, Roy Turk, Jack Smith / Harry M. Woods	3:12
2.	"The Loveliest Night of the Year"	Juventino P. Rosas, Irving Aaronson, Paul Francis Webster	2:09
3.	"Don't Sit Under the Apple Tree (with Anyone Else but Me)" / "My Pony Boy”"	Lew Brown, Charles Tobias	2:36
4.	"The Man on the Flying Trapeze”"	George Leybourne, Gaston Lyle, Alfred Lee	3:09
5.	"A-Tisket, A-Tasket" / "Billy Boy”"	Traditional / Traditional	3:11
6.	"Forever and Ever”"	Franz Winkler, Malia Rosa	3:15
Total length:			17:32
