= Miss You (1929 song) =

"Miss You" is a 1929 song by the Tobias brothers: Charles Tobias, Harry Tobias and Henry Tobias. It was the three brothers' first published song, and their first hit, but one of the few songs where all three collaborated.

The song was revived for the 1942 film Strictly in the Groove when it was sung by The Dinning Sisters and played by Ozzie Nelson and Orchestra.

== Recordings ==
The topical sentiment of the song during World War II produced several hit recordings of the song in 1942.

- Dinah Shore's version reached No. 8 in the Billboard charts in 1942, and others to chart that year were Bing Crosby (#9) (recorded January 24, 1942), Eddy Howard (#21) and Freddy Martin (#22).

Other versions

- Rudy Vallée & His Connecticut Yankees (1929)
- Geraldo and his Orchestra - vocal Beryl Davis (1942)
- Flanagan and Allen a single release by Decca (UK) (1942)
- Bill Haley and His Comets included in the album Rockin' the Oldies (1957).
- The Mills Brothers - included in their album Mmmm ... The Mills Brothers (1958)
- Jaye P. Morgan - charted at #78 on Billboard Hot 100 in February 1959.
- Dinah Washington included in her album Dinah '62 (1962)
- Nat King Cole included in his album Dear Lonely Hearts (1962).
- Vic Damone (2000)
