= Under Western Skies (album) =

Under Western Skies: Songs of the West Sung by Bing Crosby
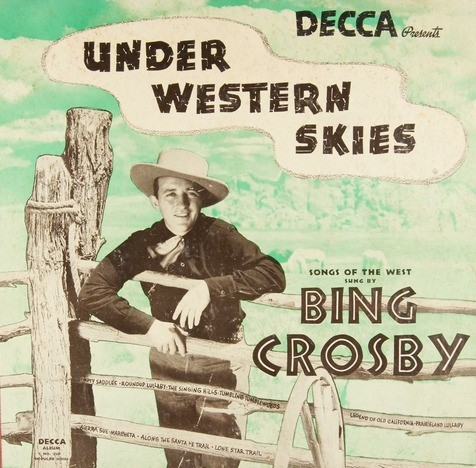

Compilation album by Bing Crosby
- Released: 1941 (original 78 rpm album)
- Recorded: 1936, 1940
- Genre: Popular, Western
- Length: 30:18
- Label: Decca

Bing Crosby chronology
Crosbyana (1941)	Under Western Skies: Songs of the West Sung by Bing Crosby (1941)	Song Hits from Holiday Inn (w/ Fred Astaire) (1942)

Under Western Skies is a compilation album of phonograph records by Bing Crosby released in 1941 featuring songs with western themes such as "Empty Saddles" and "Tumbling Tumbleweeds".

== Track listing ==
These previously issued songs were featured on a 5-disc, 78 rpm album set, Decca Album A-250.

Side / Title	Writer(s)	Recording date	Performed with	Time
Disc 1 (870):
A. "Empty Saddles"	Billy Hill	July 14, 1936	Victor Young and His Orchestra	3:01
B. "Roundup Lullaby"	Gertrude Ross, Charles Badger Clark	July 14, 1936	Victor Young and His Orchestra	3:08
Disc 2 (4200):
A. "The Singing Hills"	Mack David, Sammy Mysels, Dick Sanford	February 25, 1940	John Scott Trotter and His Orchestra	2:54
B. "Tumbling Tumbleweeds"	Bob Nolan	February 9, 1940	John Scott Trotter and His Orchestra	3:05
Disc 3 (3388):
A. "Legend of Old California"	Johnny Mercer, Harry Warren	July 27, 1940	John Scott Trotter and His Orchestra	3:03
B. "Prairieland Lullaby"	Frank Loesser, Victor Young	July 27, 1940	John Scott Trotter and His Orchestra	3:05
Disc 4 (3133):
A. "Sierra Sue"	Joseph Buell Carey	March 22, 1940	John Scott Trotter and His Orchestra	2:59
B. "Marcheta"	Victor Schertzinger	February 9, 1940	John Scott Trotter and His Orchestra	2:48
Disc 5 (4201):
A. "Along the Santa Fe Trail"	Al Dubin, Edwina Coolidge, Will Grosz	December 3, 1940	John Scott Trotter and His Orchestra	3:06
B. "Lone Star Trail"	Cindy Walker	December 3, 1940	John Scott Trotter and His Orchestra	3:09
