= I Wish You a Merry Christmas =

Studio album by Bing Crosby
- Released: October 1962
- Recorded: October 5, 1962
- Studios: Radio Recorders, Hollywood
- Genres: Vocal pop, Christmas
- Length: 31:43
- Label: Warner Bros.

Bing Crosby chronology
On the Happy Side (1962)	I Wish You a Merry Christmas (1962)	Holiday in Europe (1962)

Professional ratings
Review scores
Source	Rating
New Record Mirror	4/5 stars

I Wish You a Merry Christmas is the thirtieth solo studio album by American singer and actor Bing Crosby for his own company, Project Records, and issued by Warner Bros. (W-1484) in 1962.

The tracks were arranged by Bob Thompson, Peter Matz and Jack Halloran and each conducted the orchestra for their own arrangements. The musical accompaniment was recorded on 23 and 25 July 1962 and Crosby over-dubbed his vocals on October 5, 1962.

The album was re-released by Capitol after Crosby's death in 1977 (on LP) and again in 1988 (on CD) as Bing Crosby's Christmas Classics, with a new cover and one track – "Pat-a-Pan/ While Shepherds Watched Their Sheep" – omitted. All the songs from the original album were included on a 1998 EMI CD called Winter Wonderland in the UK and on an updated 1999 Capitol CD of Bing Crosby's Christmas Classics in the US. In 2006, the album was re-released again under the Christmas Classics name, featuring the original cover art and all of the original tracks and several bonus ones, including Crosby and David Bowie's famous duet of "Peace on Earth/Little Drummer Boy."

== Reception ==
Billboard reviewed I Wish You a Merry Christmas in November 1962, saying, "Crosby is a perennial holiday seller, and this LP should prove an important Christmas item for all dealers. The Crosby touch is everywhere evident and the material is drawn from the great Christmas catalog. Chorus and orchestra assist der Bingle on such Christmas standards as "Winter Wonderland", "Hark the Herald Angels Sing" and "Have Yourself a Merry Little Christmas"."

Warners Bros. Records took out a full-page ad advertising the album in Billboard emphasizing that the album was newly recorded. The same magazine wrote in its Nov. 24, 1962, edition: "So far only one Christmas album has really taken off. This is 'The Glorious Sound of Christmas' with the Philadelphia Orchestra and the Mormon Tabernacle Choir. However, a new Bing Crosby Christmas album on Warner Bros. is starting to move, and Bing could add another Christmas best seller to his long list with this one."

In 1965, I Wish You a Merry Christmas ranked 40th on the Billboard list of that year's 60 best-selling Christmas albums. Crosby's Decca compilation Merry Christmas ranked fourth on the same list, and he held four of the 30 spots on that year's list of best-selling Christmas singles, as well.

== Track listing ==
Side one
No.	Title	Writer(s)	Length
1.	"Winter Wonderland"	Felix Bernard, Richard B. Smith	2:27
2.	"Have Yourself a Merry Little Christmas"	Hugh Martin, Ralph Blane	2:52
3.	"What Child Is This?" / "The Holly and the Ivy"	William Chatterton Dix; Traditional	3:23
4.	"The Little Drummer Boy"	Katherine K. Davis, Henry Onorati, Harry Simeone	3:02
5.	"O Holy Night"	Adolphe Adam, John Sullivan Dwight	3:36

Side two
No.	Title	Writer(s)	Length
1.	"The Littlest Angel"	Mack David, Simon Rady	4:03
2.	"Let It Snow! Let It Snow! Let It Snow!"	Sammy Cahn, Jule Styne	2:09
3.	"Hark! The Herald Angels Sing" / "It Came Upon the Midnight Clear"	Felix Mendelssohn; Richard Storrs Willis	3:08
4.	"Frosty the Snowman"	Steve Nelson, Walter E. Rollins	2:16
5.	"Pat-a Pan" / "While Shepherds Watched Their Sheep"	Traditional	2:53
6.	"I Wish You a Merry Christmas"	Traditional	1:54
