= The Happy Prince (Bing Crosby and Orson Welles album) =

Studio album by Bing Crosby, Orson Welles, Lurene Tuttle
- Released: 1946: (original 78 rpm album); 1949 (original LP album)
- Recorded: August 21, 1945
- Genre: Short story
- Length: 12:13
- Label: Decca

Bing Crosby chronology
Don't Fence Me In (w/ The Andrews Sisters) (1946)	The Happy Prince (1946)	Selections from Road to Utopia (1946)

The Happy Prince is a studio album of phonograph records by Bing Crosby and Orson Welles of the Oscar Wilde short story The Happy Prince.

The story had been adapted for radio by Orson Welles in 1944, featuring a musical score by Bernard Herrmann. It was aired on the Philco Radio Hall of Fame broadcast on December 24, 1944 featuring Bing Crosby alongside Orson Welles, with Herrmann's music conducted by Victor Young. Lurene Tuttle played The Swallow.

Decca Records soon signed up the participants to make a commercial recording.

== Reception ==
Down Beat magazine liked the album saying: "If you’ve been getting smothered lately in record stores with scads of children’s’ albums by everybody from Artie Shaw through Ronald Colman by way of Gene Kelly, try this one on your small son. It’s the Oscar Wilde fairy tale with a Bernard Herrmann score, and in very much better taste than anything else being turned out for the Christmas rush."

== Track listing ==
These newly issued songs were featured on a 2-disc, 78 rpm album set, Decca Album No. A-420. Words by Oscar Wilde, music by Bernard Herrmann. Recorded August 21, 1945 with Victor Young and His Orchestra.

Disc 1 (40007): Part 1 (3:08) / Part 2 (3:02)
Disc 2 (40008): Part 3 (2:54) / Part 4 (3:09)

== Other releases ==
Decca released a dual 10” LP of The Happy Prince and The Small One on Decca DL6000 in 1949.
