= Crosbyana =

Decca Presents Crosbyana: 12 Favorite Songs From Bing Crosby’s Paramount Picture
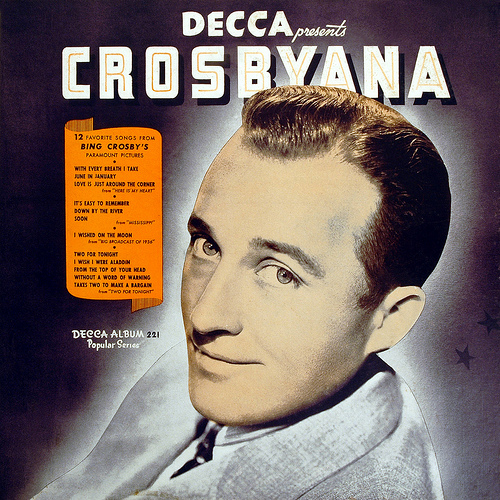

Compilation album by Bing Crosby
- Released: Original 78 album: 1941
- Recorded: 1934, 1935
- Genre: Popular
- Length: 36:17
- Label: Decca

Bing Crosby chronology
Small Fry (1941)	Decca Presents Crosbyana: 12 Favorite Songs From Bing Crosby’s Paramount Picture (1941)	Under Western Skies (1941)

Crosbyana is a compilation album of phonograph records by Bing Crosby released in 1941 featuring songs that were sung in some of Crosby's motion pictures such as Mississippi, Here is My Heart, and The Big Broadcast of 1936.

== Track listing ==
These previously issued songs were featured on a 6-disc, 78 rpm album set, Decca Album DA-221.

Side / Title	Writer(s)	Recording date	Performed with	Time
Disc 1 (3731):
A. "With Every Breath I Take"	Ralph Rainger, Leo Robin	November 9, 1934	Georgie Stoll and His Orchestra	3:15
B. "It's Easy to Remember"	Richard Rodgers, Lorenz Hart	February 21, 1935	The Rhythmettes, The Three Shades of Blue, and Georgie Stoll and His Orchestra	3:15
Disc 2 (310):
A. "June in January"	Ralph Rainger, Leo Robin	November 9, 1934	Georgie Stoll and His Orchestra	3:13
B. "Love Is Just Around the Corner"	Lewis E. Gensler, Leo Robin	November 9, 1934	Georgie Stoll and His Orchestra	3:00
Disc 3 (392):
A. "Down by the River"	Rodgers and Hart	February 21, 1935	Georgie Stoll and His Orchestra	2:50
B. "Soon"	Rodgers and Hart	February 21, 1935	Georgie Stoll and His Orchestra	3:01
Disc 4 (543):
A. "I Wished on the Moon"	Ralph Rainger, Dorothy Parker	August 14, 1935	The Dorsey Brothers Orchestra	2:50
B. "Two for Tonight"	Mack Gordon, Harry Revel	August 14, 1935	The Dorsey Brothers Orchestra	2:56
Disc 5 (547):
A. "I Wish I Were Aladdin"	Mack Gordon, Harry Revel	August 14, 1935	The Dorsey Brothers Orchestra	2:59
B. "From the Top of Your Head to the Tip of Your Toes"	Mack Gordon, Harry Revel	August 14, 1935	The Dorsey Brothers Orchestra	3:03
Disc 6 (548):
A. "Without a Word of Warning"	Mack Gordon, Harry Revel	August 14, 1935	The Dorsey Brothers Orchestra	3:07
B. "Takes Two to Make a Bargain"	Mack Gordon, Harry Revel	August 14, 1935	The Dorsey Brothers Orchestra	2:48
