= Song Hits from Holiday Inn =

Decca Presents: Song Hits from the Paramount Picture Holiday Inn
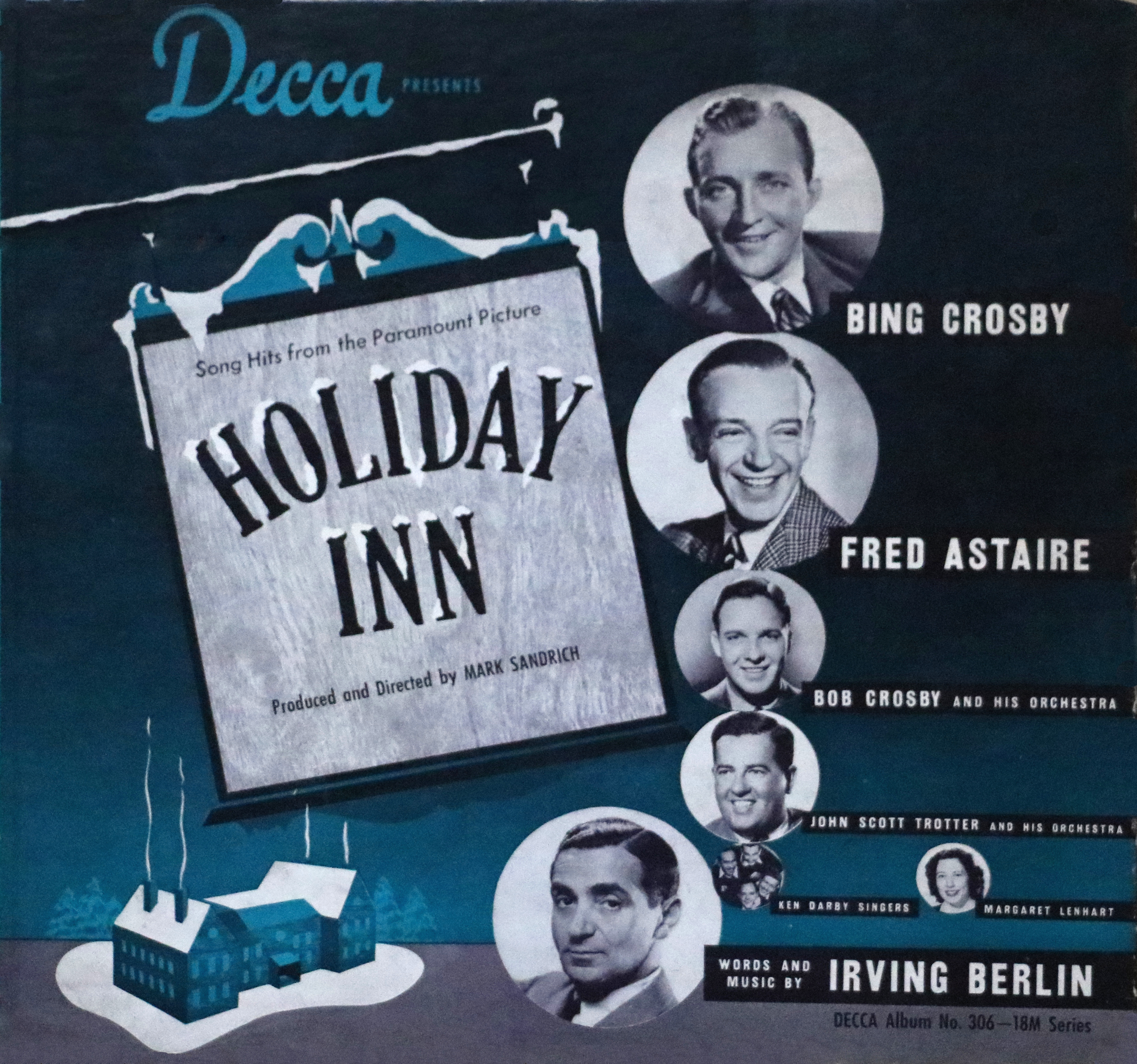

Studio album by Bing Crosby, Fred Astaire
- Released: 1942 (original 78 rpm album); 1946 (re-release 78 rpm album); 1949 (original LP album)
- Recorded: 1942
- Genre: Yearly holidays
- Length: 32:08 (original 78 rpm album); 21:02 (re-release 78 rpm album)
- Label: Decca

Bing Crosby chronology
Under; Western; Skies (1941)	Decca Presents: Song Hits from the Paramount Picture Holiday Inn (1942)	Merry Christmas (1945)

Fred Astaire chronology
Song Hits from Holiday Inn (1942)	Blue Skies (1946)

Song Hits from Holiday Inn is a studio album of phonograph records by Bing Crosby and Fred Astaire released in July 1942 featuring songs presented in the American musical film Holiday Inn. These are the longer studio recorded versions of the songs presented in the film. For the songs that were actually in the film, see Holiday Inn (soundtrack). This album is not only notable because it is one of the greatest works of the highly regarded songwriter Irving Berlin, but it is only Crosby's third studio album. This was also the first release of Crosby's signature song "White Christmas" on shellac disc record. The 1942 version would be released only one more time, in 1945's compilation album, Merry Christmas, before the song was re-recorded in 1947 (because the original master recording wore out). The later version became the standard.

== Reception ==
Billboard was very enthusiastic saying:

Decca has scored a terrific scoop in packaging 12 songs from the Irving Berlin score for Fred Astaire and Bing Crosby's movie Holiday Inn, which is already flashing on the country's screens. The album is the entire weekly release from the wax factory—and apart the music it contains, it's more than just another album, it's almost a transposition on wax of the screen score all capably executed by Bing Crosby and Fred Astaire....Plattermate is the ballad hit from the picture Be Careful It's My Heart, Crosby singing it softly and rhythmically. Trotter's soft strings and woodwinds paint the orchestral background…Album finishes in a blaze of vocal glory, most impressive in Bing Crosby's plaintive appeal for a White Christmas, assisted by the Ken Darby Singers and Trotter's music…"

== Original track listing ==
These newly issued songs were featured on a 6-disc, 78 rpm album set, Decca Album No. A-306. Discs 1, 2, 3, 4 and 6 are sung by Bing Crosby while Disc 5 is sung by Fred Astaire. On Disc 4, both sing on the track "I'll Capture Your Heart".

All songs by Irving Berlin.

Side / Title	Recording date	Performed with	Time
Disc 1 (18424):
A. "Happy Holiday"	June 1, 1942	the Music Maids and Hal, and John Scott Trotter and His Orchestra	2:46
B. "Be Careful, It's My Heart"	June 1, 1942	John Scott Trotter and His Orchestra	2:42
Disc 2 (18425):
A. "Abraham"	May 29, 1942	the Ken Darby Singers and John Scott Trotter and His Orchestra	2:45
B. "Easter Parade"	June 1, 1942	John Scott Trotter and His Orchestra	2:42
Disc 3 (18426):
A. "I've Got Plenty to Be Thankful For"	May 25, 1942	Bob Crosby and His Orchestra	2:57
B. "Song of Freedom"	May 29, 1942	the Ken Darby Singers and John Scott Trotter and His Orchestra	2:22
Disc 4 (18427):
A. "I'll Capture Your Heart"	May 27, 1942	Margaret Lenhart and Bob Crosby and His Orchestra	2:23
B. "Lazy"	May 25, 1942	Bob Crosby and His Orchestra	2:28
Disc 5 (18428):
A. "You're Easy to Dance With"	May 27, 1942	Bob Crosby and His Orchestra	2:51
B. "I Can't Tell a Lie"	May 27, 1942	Bob Crosby and His Orchestra	2:40
Disc 6 (18429):
A. "White Christmas"	May 29, 1942	Ken Darby Singers and John Scott Trotter and His Orchestra	2:59
B. "Let's Start the New Year Right"	May 25, 1942	Bob Crosby and His Orchestra	2:33

== Re-issue track listing ==
In 1946, a set was released with some of the songs from the movie. It featured all of songs except for "White Christmas" and a few others because they would sell more as a single than with a set. These reissued songs were featured on a 4-disc, 78 rpm album set, Decca Album No. A-534.

Disc 1 (23820): "Happy Holiday" / "Be Careful, it's My Heart"
Disc 2 (23821): "Abraham" / "Song of Freedom"
Disc 3 (23822): "You're Easy to Dance With" / "I Can't Tell A Lie"
Disc 4 (23823): "I'll Capture Your Heart" / "Let's Start the New Year Right"

The titles "White Christmas", "Easter Parade", "I've Got Plenty to Be Thankful For" and "Lazy", were available separately as 78 rpm discs for US$0.75 each, during this period.

== LP track listing ==
The 1949 10-inch LP album issue Decca DL 5092 consisted of eight songs on one 33 1/3 rpm record, and did not include four of the songs. All were reissues of earlier recordings.

Side 1

1. "Happy Holiday"
2. "Be Careful, it's My Heart"
3. "Abraham"
4. "Song of Freedom"

Side 2

1. "You're Easy to Dance With"
2. "I Can't Tell A Lie"
3. "I'll Capture Your Heart"
4. "Let's Start the New Year Right"

== Other releases ==
In 1962, Decca released Selections from Holiday Inn on Decca DL 4256 with a new pinkish look for the set Bing's Hollywood. It included all of the recorded songs.

In 1998, MCA released a CD re-issue of the Selections from Holiday Inn.

In 2008 UMG released a CD edition of the original version with the DVD release of Holiday Inn.
