= Don't Fence Me In (Decca album) =

Don't Fence Me In: Songs of the Wide Open Spaces
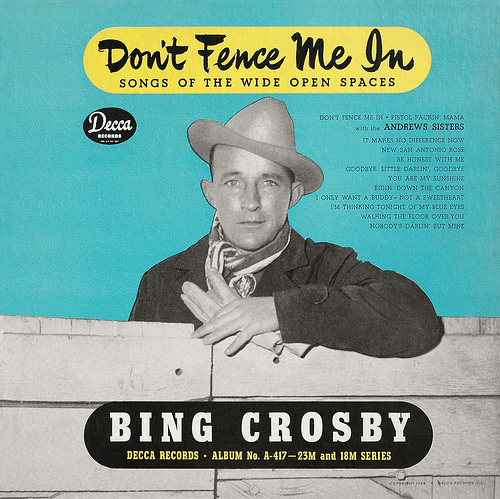

Compilation album by Bing Crosby, The Andrews Sisters
- Released: 1946
- Recorded: 1940–1943
- Genre: Traditional pop
- Length: 33:56 (original release)
- Label: Decca

Bing Crosby chronology
Selections from The Bells of St. Mary's (1946)	Don't Fence Me In: Songs of the Wide Open Spaces (1946)	The Happy Prince (1946)

Andrews Sisters chronology
Don't Fence Me In (1946)	The Andrews Sisters (1946)

Don't Fence Me In is a compilation album of phonograph records by Bing Crosby and The Andrews Sisters released in 1946 featuring Country and Western songs. This album contained the enormously popular record "Pistol Packin' Mama", which sold over a million copies and became the first number one hit on the then-new Juke Box Folk Song Records Chart that was later renamed the Hot Country Songs Chart.

== Chart performance ==
The original 78 rpm album peaked at number two on the Billboard Best-Selling Popular Record Albums chart in April 1946.

== Original track listing ==
These previously released songs were featured on a 6-disc, 78 rpm album set, Decca Album No. A-417. The Andrews Sisters appear on Disc 1.

Side / Title	Writers	Recording date	Performed with	Time
Disc 1 (23484):
A. "Don't Fence Me In"	Cole Porter	July 25, 1944	Vic Schoen and His Orchestra	3:04
B. "Pistol Packin' Mama"	Al Dexter	September 27, 1943	Vic Schoen and His Orchestra	2:59
Disc 2 (18766):
A. "New San Antonio Rose"	Bob Wills	December 16, 1940	Bob Crosby and His Orchestra	3:14
B. "It Makes No Difference Now"	Jimmie Davis, Floyd Tillman	December 16, 1940	Bob Crosby and His Orchestra	2:38
Disc 3 (18767):
A. "Be Honest with Me"	Gene Autry, Fred Rose	May 23, 1941	The John Scott Trotter Eight	2:36
B. "Goodbye, Little Darlin', Goodbye"	Johnny Marvin, Gene Autry	May 23, 1941	The John Scott Trotter Eight	2:47
Disc 4 (18768):
A. "You Are My Sunshine"	Jimmie Davis, Charles Mitchell	July 8, 1941	Vic Schoen and His Orchestra	2:33
B. "Ridin' Down the Canyon"	Gene Autry, Smiley Burnette	July 8, 1941	Vic Schoen and His Orchestra	2:46
Disc 5 (18769):
A. "I'm Thinking Tonight of My Blue Eyes"	Alvin Pleasant Carter	January 18, 1942	Woody Herman and His Woodchoppers	3:11
B. "I Only Want a Buddy, Not a Sweetheart"	Eddie Jones	December 30, 1940	Victor Young and His Orchestra	2:41
Disc 6 (18770):
A. "Walking the Floor Over You"	Ernest Tubb	May 27, 1942	Bob Crosby and His Bob Cats	3:08
B. "Nobody's Darlin' But Mine"	Jimmie Davis	January 26, 1942	Bob Crosby and His Bob Cats	2:19

== Re-issue track listing ==
In 1947, another set was released. It excluded two of the songs from the original album. The only design difference is that the text cylinder at the bottom was turned white. You can see the black one on the original album above. These previously released songs were featured on a 4-disc, 78 rpm album set, Decca Album No. A-559.

Disc 1 (23848): "Don't Fence Me In" / "Pistol Packin' Mama"
Disc 2 (23968): "New San Antonio Rose"/ "It Makes No Difference Now"
Disc 3 (23969): "You Are My Sunshine" / "Ridin' Down the Canyon"
Disc 4 (23970): "Walking the Floor Over You" / "Nobody's Darlin' But Mine"

== LP track listing ==
The 1949 10-inch LP album issue Decca DL 5063 consisted of eight songs on one 33 1/3 rpm record. All were reissues of earlier recordings:

Side 1

1. "Don't Fence Me In", recorded July 25, 1944 with Vic Schoen and His Orchestra
2. "Pistol Packin' Mama", recorded September 27, 1943 with Vic Schoen and His Orchestra
3. "New San Antonio Rose", recorded December 16, 1940 with Bob Crosby and His Orchestra
4. "It Makes No Difference Now", recorded December 16, 1940 with Bob Crosby and His Orchestra

Side 2

5. "You Are My Sunshine", recorded July 8, 1941 with Vic Schoen and His Orchestra
6. "Ridin' Down the Canyon", recorded July 8, 1941 with Vic Schoen and His Orchestra
7. "Walking the Floor Over You", recorded May 27, 1942 with Bob Crosby and His Bob Cats
8. "Nobody's Darlin' But Mine", recorded January 26, 1942 with Bob Crosby and His Bob Cats
