= Selections from Road to Utopia =

Studio album by Bing Crosby
- Released: Original 78 album: 1946
- Recorded: 1944, 1946
- Genre: Popular
- Length: 16:36
- Label: Decca

Bing Crosby chronology
The Happy Prince (1946)	Selections from Road to Utopia (1946)	Bing Crosby – Stephen Foster (1946)

Selections from Road to Utopia is the fourth solo studio album by American singer and actor Bing Crosby released in 1946 as a Phonograph record, featuring songs that were presented in the American musical comedy film Road to Utopia. However, the song "Road to Morocco" came from the film of the same name and was not actually used in Road to Utopia. Another song - "Goodtime Charlie" - was sung by Crosby and Bob Hope in the film but was not commercially recorded. The songs "Would You?" and "Personality" were sung by Dorothy Lamour in the film, not Crosby.

== Track listing ==
These newly issued songs were featured on a 3-disc, 78 rpm album set, Decca Album No. A-423. All songs written by Jimmy Van Heusen (music) and Johnny Burke (lyrics).

Side / Title	Recording date	Performed with	Time
Disc 1 (40000):
A. "Put It There, Pal"	December 8, 1944	Bob Hope and Vic Schoen and His Orchestra	2:21
B. "Road to Morocco"	December 8, 1944	Bob Hope and Vic Schoen and His Orchestra	2:56
Disc 2 (18743):
A. "Welcome to My Dream"	July 17, 1944	John Scott Trotter and His Orchestra	2:24
B. "It's Anybody's Spring"	July 17, 1944	John Scott Trotter and His Orchestra	2:39
Disc 3 (18790):
A. "Personality"	January 16, 1946	Eddie Condon and His Orchestra	3:30
B. "Would You?"	July 19, 1944	John Scott Trotter and His Orchestra	2:46
