= Empty Saddles (in the Old Corral) =

Record label for Bing Crosby's 1936 Decca recording of "Empty Saddles"

"Empty Saddles (in the Old Corral)" is a classic American cowboy song written by Billy Hill. He based the song on a poem by J. Keirn Brennan, grieving for lost companions. The song became widely known to the public in July 1936, when Bing Crosby sang it with deep emotion in the Paramount musical Rhythm on the Range, and his Decca recording of it, made on July 14, 1936, with Victor Young and his Orchestra, reached the Top 10 that September.

Crosby's recording of this and other "country" songs gave them a legitimacy by showing that they could appeal to pop sophisticates, as well as rural audiences. He performed them with integrity and did not "look down his nose" at the music.

"Empty Saddles" was later recorded by many artists, including the Sons of the Pioneers, Johnny Bond, and Sons of the San Joaquin. Particularly notable recordings were by Roy Rogers (1947), Burl Ives (1961), Dean Martin (1966), and Jimmie Rodgers (1983).

Members of the Western Writers of America chose it as one of their Top 100 Western songs of all time.
