= Personality (Jimmy Van Heusen and Johnny Burke song) =

1946 song

Single by Johnny Mercer and the Pied Pipers with Paul Weston and His Orchestra
- B-side: "If I Knew Then"
- Released: December 1945
- Genre: Traditional pop
- Length: 2:49
- Label: Capitol
- Composer: Jimmy Van Heusen
- Lyricist: Johnny Burke

"Personality" is a popular song with lyrics by Johnny Burke and music by Jimmy Van Heusen. It was written for the 1946 film Road to Utopia, and Dorothy Lamour performed it in the movie. Van Heusen said that he wrote the song with a limited vocal range to accommodate Lamour.

In a slightly longer version, the song became a number one Billboard hit for Johnny Mercer and the Pied Pipers with Capitol Records in 1946. Dinah Shore also recorded it around that time and her version charted at #10. Lamour was between record contracts at the time of the film's release, so she did not record the song herself until years later.

The song employs tongue-in-cheek, slightly bawdy lyrics and an ironic use of the word "personality." The lyrics suggest that men are often attracted to a woman because of her shapely figure (called euphemistically her “personality”) rather than other beauty traits or any other admirable qualities she might possess.

== Cover versions ==
- Bing Crosby recorded the song with Eddie Condon and His Orchestra in January 1946 and it reached the No. 9 spot in the Billboard charts in April 1946.
- Al Hirt and Ann-Margret released a version on their 1964 album, Beauty and the Beard.

== Song in popular culture ==
- Rewritten versions of the song have been used as commercial jingles. The most notable was "Wessonality," an advertisement for Wesson cooking oil sung by Florence Henderson.
- The Johnny Mercer version features in the 2015 videogame Fallout 4 on the in-game radio station Diamond City Radio.
- The song plays on the soundtrack during the screen test preparation montage in episode 4 of Ryan Murphy’s Hollywood miniseries.
