= Henry Tobias =

American songwriter (1905–1997)

Henry Tobias (Worcester, Massachusetts, 23 April 1905 – 5 December 1997) was an American songwriter. He was the youngest of the three brothers, Charles Tobias, Harry Tobias Tobias wrote the 1974 song "Hang In There, Mr. President" in support of Richard Nixon, recorded by Bernie Knee with Frank Yankovic and his Orchestra and released on Telemark.
