= Small Fry (song) =

Single by Bing Crosby & Johnny Mercer
- Released: 1938
- Recorded: 1 July 1938
- Genre: Pop
- Length: 3:06
- Label: Decca DLA1297
- Songwriters: Frank Loesser, Hoagy Carmichael

"Small Fry" is an American popular song written in 1938 by Hoagy Carmichael and Frank Loesser. It was first sung and introduced by Bing Crosby, in the film Sing You Sinners (1938). In the film, Crosby sings it in a musical sequence with a young Donald O'Connor and Fred MacMurray.

Crosby recorded the song on July 1, 1938 with Johnny Mercer dueting and this reached the No. 3 spot in the charts of the day. He also recorded a solo version of the song for V-Disc in 1944.

Other versions have been recorded by Mildred Bailey (she reached #9 in the charts in 1938), Al Bowlly (recorded on October 14, 1938 - see Al Bowlly Discography), June Christy (1960), Matt Monro (1962),and Crystal Gayle (used in her 1999 album Crystal Gayle Sings the Heart and Soul of Hoagy Carmichael).

A fish-themed Fleischer Studios (direction by Dave Fleischer) animated cartoon in 1939, Small Fry, used the song to convey a warning to youngsters to not want to grow up too quickly.
