= Around the World with Three Dog Night =

Live album by Three Dog Night
- Released: February 13, 1973
- Studios: Pye Mobile Recording Unit; ABC, Los Angeles, California
- Genre: Pop rock
- Length: 67:50
- Label: Dunhill
- Producer: Richard Podolor

Three Dog Night chronology
Seven Separate Fools (1972)	Around the World with Three Dog Night (1973)	Cyan (1973)

Professional ratings
Review scores
Source	Rating
AllMusic	2/5 stars

Around the World with Three Dog Night is a double live album by American rock band Three Dog Night, released in 1973.

== Track listing ==
No.	Title	Original album	Length
1.	"One Man Band" (Billy Fox, January Tyme, Thomas Jefferson Kaye)	Naturally (1970)	2:33
2.	"Never Been to Spain" (Hoyt Axton)	Harmony (1971)	3:33
3.	"Going in Circles" (Jaiananda, Ted Myers)	Seven Separate Fools (1972)	2:44
4.	"The Family of Man" (Jack Conrad, Paul Williams)	Harmony (1971)	2:50
5.	"Midnight Runaway" (Gary Itri)	Seven Separate Fools (1972)	5:51
6.	"Liar" (Russ Ballard)	Naturally (1970)	3:49
7.	"Good Feeling 1957" (Alan Brackett, John Merrill)	It Ain't Easy (1970)	4:36
8.	"Organ Solo" (Greenspoon)	Live performance	4:36
9.	"Eli's Coming" (Laura Nyro)	Suitable for Framing (1969)	4:23
10.	"Joy to the World" (Axton)	Naturally (1970)	2:40
11.	"Black and White" (David I. Arkin, Earl Robinson)	Seven Separate Fools (1972)	2:56
12.	"Pieces of April" (Dave Loggins)	Seven Separate Fools (1972)	4:07
13.	"Out in the Country" (Roger Nichols, Paul Williams)	It Ain't Easy (1970)	3:25
14.	"Mama Told Me (Not to Come)" (Randy Newman)	It Ain't Easy (1970)	2:59
15.	"Drum Solo" (Sneed)	Live performance	5:53
16.	"An Old Fashioned Love Song" (Paul Williams)	Harmony (1971)	3:51
17.	"Jam" (Three Dog Night)	Live performance	7:04

== Personnel ==
=== Musicians ===
- Cory Wells - vocals
- Chuck Negron - vocals
- Danny Hutton - vocals
- Mike Allsup - guitar
- Joe Schermie - bass
- Floyd Sneed - drums
- Jimmy Greenspoon - keyboards

=== Production ===
- Producer: Richard Podolor
- Recording engineer: Alan Perkins (Pye Mobile Recording Unit)

== Charts ==
Album - Billboard (United States)

Year	Chart	Position
1973	Canada	21
1973	US Top 200	18
1973	Japan Oricon	9

== Certifications ==
Region	Certification	Certified units/sales
United States (RIAA)	Gold	500,000^{^}
^{^} Shipments figures based on certification alone.
