= Seven Separate Fools =

Studio album by Three Dog Night
- Released: July 1972
- Studios: American Recording Co., Studio City, California
- Genres: Pop; rock
- Length: 41:07
- Label: Dunhill
- Producer: Richard Podolor

Three Dog Night chronology
Harmony (1971)	Seven Separate Fools (1972)	Around the World with Three Dog Night (1973)

Singles from Seven Separate Fools
- 1. "Black and White" Released: August 1972; 2. "Pieces of April" Released: November 1972

Seven Separate Fools is the sixth studio album by American rock band Three Dog Night. Released in 1972, the album reached number six on the US Billboard 200, becoming the band's highest-charting album. The LP version of the album was released with seven large playing cards (each nearly 12 inches in height) as an extra bonus.

Beach Boys founder Brian Wilson, who contributed "Time to Get Alone" to the pre-TDN vocal trio Redwood, placed the LP at No. 3 among his all-time Top Ten favorite records in a 2016 conversation with Esquire's Middle East branch. Wilson succinctly stated, "Danny Hutton’s vocals are truly on point."

Professional ratings
Review scores
Source	Rating
Rolling Stone	(not rated) link
Christgau's Record Guide	C
Tom Hull	C+

== Track listing ==
1. "Black and White" (David I. Arkin, Earl Robinson) – 3:51
2. "My Old Kentucky Home (Turpentine and Dandelion Wine)" (Randy Newman) – 3:08
3. "Prelude to Morning" (Jimmy Greenspoon) – 2:04
4. "Pieces of April" (Dave Loggins) – 4:10
5. "Going in Circles" (Jaiananda, Ted Myers) – 3:06
6. "Chained" (Russ Ballard) – 5:14
7. "Tulsa Turnaround" (Larry Collins, Alex Harvey) – 3:41
8. "In Bed" (Tom Baird, Lynn Henderson, Wes Henderson) – 3:58
9. "Freedom for the Stallion" (Allen Toussaint) – 3:41
10. "The Writing's on the Wall" (Domenic Troiano) – 3:17
11. "Midnight Runaway" (Gary Itri) – 5:28

== Personnel ==
- Mike Allsup – guitar
- Jimmy Greenspoon – keyboards
- Danny Hutton – lead vocals (tracks 1, 5, 6, 8, 9, 10), background vocals
- Chuck Negron – lead vocals (tracks 4, 5, 6, 9, 11), background vocals
- Joe Schermie – bass guitar
- Floyd Sneed – drums
- Cory Wells – lead vocals (tracks 2, 5, 7, 8, 9), background vocals

with:

- Patrick Sullivan – cello on "Pieces of April"
- Gary Itri – acoustic guitar on "Midnight Runaway"

== Production ==
- Producer: Richard Podolor
- Ed Caraeff – art direction, photography, design concept
- David Larkham – graphics, typography, design concept

== Charts ==
Chart (1972)	Peak position
Australia (Kent Music Report)	21
US Pop Albums	6

Singles – Billboard (United States)

Year	Single	Chart	Position
1972	"Black and White" (3:24 edit)	Pop Singles	1
1972	"Black and White" (3:24 edit)	Adult Contemporary	1
1972	"Pieces of April"	Pop Singles	19
1972	"Pieces of April"	Adult Contemporary	6

== Certifications ==
Region	Certification	Certified units/sales
United States (RIAA)	Gold	500,000^{^}
^{^} Shipments figures based on certification alone.
