= What Did You Expect? (Michael Cohen album) =

Studio album by Michael Cohen
- Released: 1973
- Genre: Folk rock
- Label: Folkways
- Producer: Judith Sherman

Michael Cohen chronology
Mike Cohen (1972)	What Did You Expect? (1973)

What Did You Expect? is an album by the American singer-songwriter Michael Cohen which was released on Folkways Records (FS 8582 Folkways Records, 1973). The album was re-released by Smithsonian Folkways Records as a compact disc (FW0852 Smithsonian Folkways Records).

It is Cohen's second album, following his self released debut Mike Cohen (1972). The original LP carried a sticker on the front cover which stated, Songs sensitively and honestly dealing with the experiences of being gay, written and sung by this brilliant young artist Solos and group. This album, along with Steven Grossman's Caravan Tonight (1974) and Chris Robison's Chris Robison and His Many Hand Band (1973), is one of the first to deal with openly gay themes and issues within the song lyrics. The style of the album is very much within the folk-rock genre and it includes the song "Bitterfeast" which adapts a poem by Cohen's namesake and fellow singer-songwriter Leonard Cohen.

Musicians who played on the album include the drummer Kevin Kelley.

== Track listing ==
1. "The Last Angry Young Man"(5.04)
2. "Gone"(4.55)
3. "Pray To Your God"(4.30)
4. "Bitter Beginning"(3.37)
5. "Praised Be"(3.59)
6. "Bitterfeast"(3.20)
7. "When I Grow Cold"(4.35)
8. "Orion"(4.40)
9. "Couldn't Do Without"(5.08)

== Personnel ==
- Michael Cohen - guitar, organ, vocals
- Michael Lobel - electric guitar, flute
- John Henry Curry, Jordan Kaplan - bass
