= Steven Grossman =

Steven Grossman or Steve Grossman may refer to:

- Steve Grossman (saxophonist) (1951–2020), American jazz saxophonist
- Steven Grossman (musician) (1951–1991), American singer-songwriter from the early 1970s
- Steven Grossman (politician) (born 1946), American politician and former Treasurer and Receiver-General of Massachusetts
