= Twiggy (album) =

Studio album by Twiggy
- Released: July 1976
- Recorded: 1976
- Studios: Phonogram (London, UK)
- Genres: Country; pop
- Label: Mercury
- Producer: Tony Eyers

Twiggy chronology
| Twiggy (1976) | Please Get My Name Right (1977) |

Singles from Twiggy
- 1. "Here I Go Again"

Twiggy is the self-titled debut album from British model and singer Twiggy. It was released in 1976 in the UK and mainland Europe. The album featured the top-20 single "Here I Go Again". The album peaked at number 33 on the UK albums chart, receiving a silver certification.

== Album information ==
After four years of modelling, Twiggy retired in 1970, and embarked on an acting and singing career. Twiggy spoke of her debut album, "My first real album after my record deal with Phonogram - I'd always absolutely adored country music, I guess it was always my 'thing'. This album was slightly more country than 'Please Get My Name Right', which was more pop I suppose. The first album did rather well, earning me a silver disc, although they both did very well. This album was produced by Tony Eyers, who was a hot record producer at the time.".

The album included the UK top-20 hit, "Here I Go Again", which peaked at number 17.

== Critical reception ==
The album was warmly received by Rolling Stone, with reviewer Billy Altman opining, "Her voice, which at alternate times recalls Olivia Newton-John and Melanie (but without the former's calculated submissiveness or the latter's hyperextended vulnerability) is strong and self-assured". Also commenting, "she has a fine sense of where the heart of a song lies (...) There is a delicateness and vitality in Twiggy's music that is well above the usual MOR fare and one wishes her good luck in a field that is, if anything, more volatile and fickle than the modeling and fashion world".

== Track listing ==
| No. | Title | Writer(s) | Length |
|---|---|---|---|
| 1. | "Vanilla Olay" | Jackie DeShannon | 3:24 |
| 2. | "Good for You Too" | Toni Brown | 3:15 |
| 3. | "Just Bidin' My Time" | Gene MacLellan | 3:08 |
| 4. | "Pieces of April" | Dave Loggins | 4:17 |
| 5. | "Appalachian Boy" | Dianne Davidson | 3:15 |
| 6. | "Rain on the Roof" | John Sebastian | 2:26 |
| 7. | "Here I Go Again" | Country Joe McDonald | 3:31 |
| 8. | "Vaudeville Man" | Wendy Waldman | 2:42 |
| 9. | "Caravan Tonight" | Steven Grossman | 3:40 |
| 10. | "Done My Cryin' Time" | Toni Brown | 3:54 |
| 11. | "Everything Comes in Time" | Toni Brown | 4:24 |
| Total length: | | | 37:56 |

== Charts ==
| Chart (1976) | Peak position |
|---|---|
| UK Albums Chart | 33 |

== Certifications ==
| Region | Certification | Certified units/sales |
|---|---|---|
| United Kingdom (BPI) | Silver | 60,000^{^} |
^{^} Shipments figures based on certification alone.

== Personnel ==
- Twiggy: Vocal
- Gerry Butler: Arrangement
- Steve Brown: Engineer
