= Caravan Tonight =

Studio album by Steven Grossman
- Released: 1974
- Recorded: December 1973 7 January 1974 at Sound Ideas Studios N.Y.C
- Genre: Folk rock
- Label: Mercury
- Producer: Bobby Flax & Lanny Lambert for Very Very Productions LTD

Steven Grossman chronology
Caravan Tonight (1974)	Something In The Moonlight (2011)

Professional ratings
Review scores
Source	Rating
Christgau's Record Guide	B

Caravan Tonight is the first album by American singer-songwriter Steven Grossman. Released in 1974, it was the first album dealing with openly gay themes and subject matter within its lyrics to be released on a major label (Mercury Records). At the time of its release, Stephen Holden in Rolling Stone described it as, "...staggering, its appeal to the finest human values universal." Grossman himself said of the album, "The songs on the album came from a time when I was flipping out. Really confused... But for the first time I could write about what I felt not what I thought other people wanted to hear."

English model, actress, and singer Twiggy recorded a cover of the title track "Caravan Tonight" on her 1976 self-titled album.

Singer/songwriter Mark Weigle covered "Out" on his 2002 album Out of the Loop; it was a digital duet with Grossman.

== Track listing ==
Side one

1. Caravan Tonight
2. Out
3. Five O'Clock Song
4. Christopher's Blues
5. Song to Bonnie
6. Song to That M&M Man

Side two

1. You Don't Have to Be Ashamed
2. Many Kinds of Love
3. Can't...Papa Blues
4. Circle Nine Times
5. Dry Dock Dreaming

== Musicians ==
- Acoustic guitar and vocals – Steven Grossman
- Acoustic lead and electric guitar – Vinny Fuccella
- Bass – Andy Munson
- Drums – Jimmy Young
- Keyboards and recorder – Chris Dedrick
- Congas and percussion – George Devens
- Mandolin, banjo, pedal steel guitar – Eric Weissberg
- Background vocals – Steven, Bobby, Lanny and The Free Design
- Horns and strings arranged and conducted by Chris Dedrick
