= What Did You Expect? =

What Did You Expect? may refer to:

- What Did You Expect? (Jackie Martling album), 1979
- What Did You Expect? (Michael Cohen album), 1973
- "What Did You Expect?", a song by Neck Deep from Rain in July
- What Did You Expect? (film), 2012
