= Supersonic (TV series) =

- Genre: Pop music show
- Country of origin: United Kingdom
- Original language: English

Production
- Camera setup: Multi-camera
- Running time: 25 minutes

Original release
- Network: ITV
- Release: 1975 – 1976

Supersonic is a British television music show, which featured pop music artists of the day, one of the many attempts by ITV to equal the success of the BBC's Top of the Pops. Launched in 1975, the show typically lasted 25 minutes (excluding commercials) and was produced by London Weekend Television for the ITV network, running for two years.

The programme was rarely, if ever, seen at the same time in all ITV regions. Although initially planned for LWT's Saturday morning schedule, the first series was broadcast by Anglia, Border, Grampian, Tyne-Tees, Ulster and Yorkshire on Thursdays at 5.20pm from 4 September 1975; ATV transmitted it on Fridays at 5.20pm from 5 September 1975; LWT and Westward showed it at 11.05am from Saturday 6 September 1975; Granada at 5.20pm from Monday 8 September 1975; and Scottish Television started showing it a week later, from Saturday 13 September. The Supersonic Christmas Show 1975 (Series 1, Show 18) was broadcast on 26 December 1975 at 5.30pm in 7 of the ITV regions, and on 27 December 1975 in 3 regions (including LWT). By the beginning of 1976, LWT had moved transmissions to early Saturday evening but this was mainly in London, the other regions continuing to schedule the series at different times or days, or not broadcasting it at all. The programme was devised and created by David Deyong and presented by film and music producer Mike Mansfield and the main theme was composed and sung by Andy Bown.

Although the show featured performers with songs in the music charts, the show, unlike Top of the Pops, was not chart-based. Whilst Top of the Pops ran all year, Supersonic had a limited run with season one consisting of 30 editions and season two consisting of 28.

The show was recorded in front of an audience at London Weekend's studios, then known as the South Bank Television Centre, and used a style of production in which television cameras were highly visible, and areas such as the production gallery were featured. Its producer and director also doubled as host, cueing in performances from the studio gallery instead of presenting conventional links to camera.

The original series had some limited American broadcast syndication at the time. Later, musical performances from this show were repackaged for U.S. television, under the title Twiggy's Jukebox, hosted by model-turned-actor/singer Twiggy, which ran for one season from 1978 to 1979.

In 2019, Elbow frontman Guy Garvey narrated From The Vaults – a six-part series on UK TV channel Sky Arts which featured Supersonic performances from 1975 including the Electric Light Orchestra, Rod Stewart, Status Quo and Roxy Music. The series returned for a second season the following year.
