= Twiggy's Jukebox =

American television series

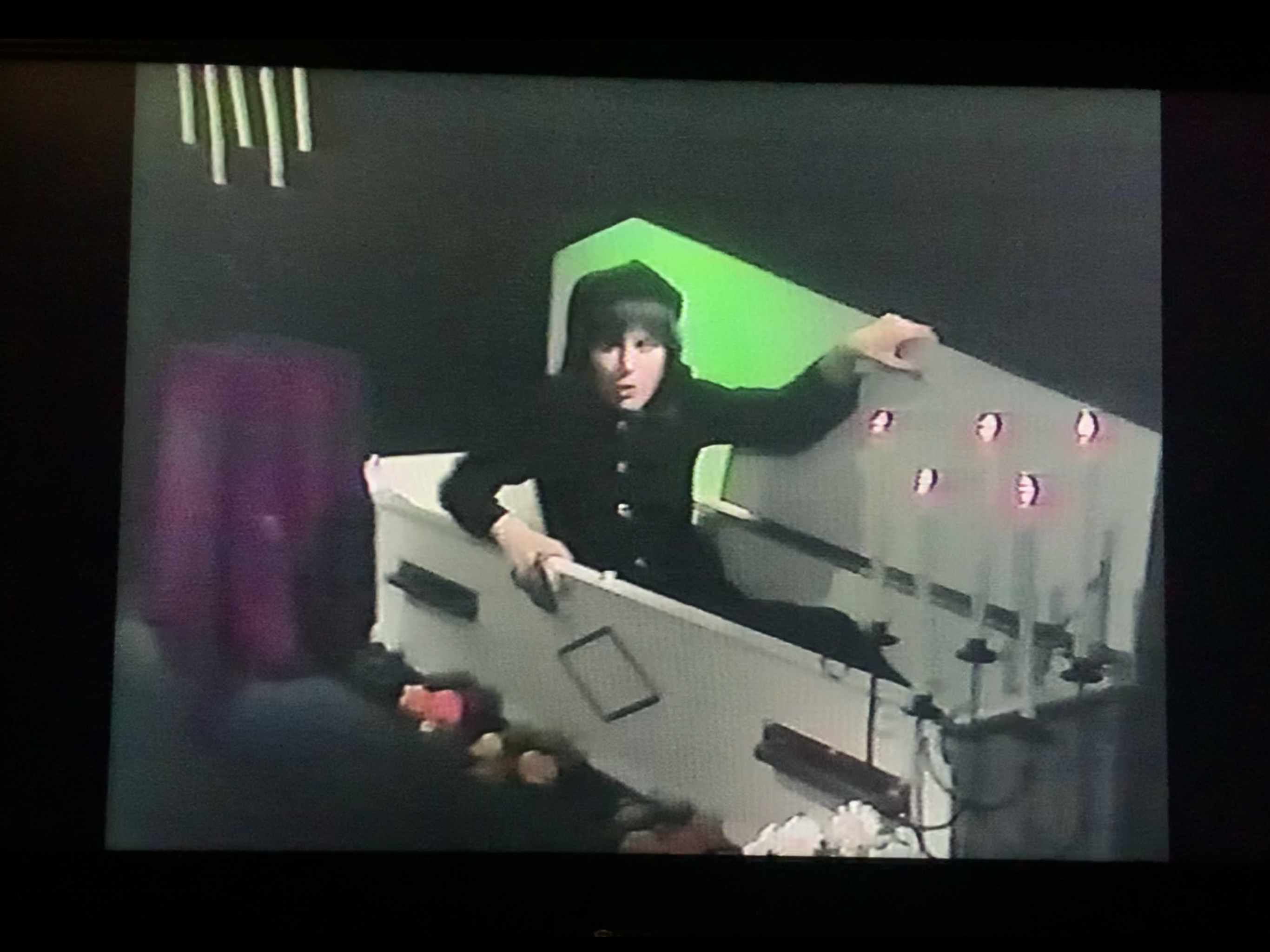
"Monster Mash," once banned by the BBC, later was performed on Twiggy’s Jukebox in 1978.

Twiggy's Jukebox was a weekly glam rock music TV series seen throughout the United States during the 1978-1979 television season. It took musical performances from the 1975-1976 British series Supersonic and recut them with content featuring host Twiggy. The program was distributed by American International Television (AITV) to local stations throughout the United States.

After one season, Twiggy left the series, and AITV restructured the property for the 1979–1980 season into a notably different program, titled Jukebox and starring Britt Ekland, who introduced standard music videos. The Ekland version of the series lasted only one season. Twenty-six total episodes were produced. The series was produced by Paul Flattery and directed by Bruce Gowers for Jon Roseman Productions International.
