= That Certain Feeling =

1925 song composed by George Gershwin

Song
- Language: English
- Released: 1925
- Genre: Jazz
- Composer: George Gershwin
- Lyricist: Ira Gershwin

"That Certain Feeling" is a 1925 song composed by George Gershwin, with lyrics by Ira Gershwin.

It was introduced by Allen Kearns and Queenie Smith in the 1925 musical Tip-Toes. It has since endured as the most popular song from the musical, and one of only two songs from Tip Toes which became a jazz standard, the other being "Sweet and Low Down". It was later used as the title of a 1956 Bob Hope film when it was performed during the opening credits by Pearl Bailey and later reprised by Bob Hope

Musicologist Philip Furia describes the song as one of George Gershwin's "trickiest melodies ... [laced] with surprising syncopations". The song was praised by Furia as an innovative departure from conventional Tin Pan Alley songs with "simple five note phrase[s]". Alec Wilder extensively analysed the melody of "That Certain Feeling" in his 1972 book American Popular Song. Wilder described the song as "mint Gershwin" characterised by the "rarefied elements" of "boldness", "wit" and "unexpectedness". Wilder felt it was the first of a "long line of songs" that demonstrated George Gershwin's "obsession with repeated notes".

Howard Pollack described the song as the "most insouciant" of foxtrots with "whimsical rhymes".

Regarding Ira Gershwin's lyrics, Furia felt that they showed his flair for "comic effects" in their imitation of the use of fused syllables common in American speech. Ira Gershwin himself complained that singers missed the "rhythmic point" of the song by giving "equal value to the first three notes and words". Furia felt that this was due to their failure to appreciate the intricate "interplay between words, notes and rests". Furia described Gershwin's lyrics as "wittily [refreshing] the formula of romantic euphoria".

== Notable recordings ==
- George Gershwin - rec. 1926
- Layton & Johnstone - rec. November 1926 - released as Columbia WA 4530
- Dorothy Dickson and Allen Kearns, Jack Clarke, G. Myddleton - rec. September 9, 1926 - released as Columbia 91298, matrix WA 1887
- Paul Whiteman and His Orchestra - recorded on December 24, 1925, for Victor Records, catalog No. 19920. A popular version in 1926.
- Josephine Baker - rec. 1926 - released as Odeon 49.171
- Shirley Ross - for the Decca 78 rpm album George Gershwin Songs, Vol. 1 (1939).
- Les Brown and Jo Ann Greer - recorded May 18, 1956 - released as Capitol 3463.
- Ella Fitzgerald - rec. 1959 - from Ella Fitzgerald Sings the George and Ira Gershwin Songbook
