= George Gershwin Songs, Vol. 1 =

1939 compilation album

Decca Presents an Album of George Gershwin Songs, Vol. 1

Compilation album by Bing Crosby, Jacques Fray, Anne Jamieson, The Merry Macs, Shirley Ross
- Released: Original 78 album: 1939
- Recorded: 1939
- Genre: Popular
- Label: Decca

Bing Crosby chronology
Victor Herbert Melodies, Vol. Two (1939)	Decca Presents an Album of George Gershwin Songs, Vol. 1 (1939)	Ballad for Americans (1940)

George Gershwin Songs, Vol. 1 is a Decca Records studio album (No. A-96) of five 78 rpm phonograph records celebrating the music of George Gershwin.

== Track listing ==
Disc 1: (2874)

1. "Somebody Loves Me", recorded on June 14, 1939, by Bing Crosby with Victor Young and His Orchestra. (B. G. DeSylva, George Gershwin, Ballard MacDonald) − 2:44
2. "Maybe", recorded on June 14, 1939, by Bing Crosby with Victor Young and His Orchestra. (G. Gershwin, Ira Gershwin) − 2:44

Disc 2: (2875)

3. "'S Wonderful / My One and Only", recorded on September 18, 1939, by Jacques Fray with Mario Braggiotti.
4. "Who Cares? / Wintergreen for President", recorded on August 3, 1939, by Jacques Fray with Mario Braggiotti.

Disc 3: (2876)

5. "Summertime", recorded on July 14, 1939, by Anne Jamieson.
6. "Looking for a Boy", recorded on July 14, 1939, by Anne Jamieson.

Disc 4: (2877)

7. "Clap Yo' Hands", recorded on September 5, 1939, by The Merry Macs.
8. "I Got Rhythm", recorded on September 5, 1939, by The Merry Macs.

Disc 5: (2878)

9. "Mine", recorded on July 5, 1939, by Shirley Ross and The Foursome.
10. "That Certain Feeling", recorded on July 5, 1939, by Shirley Ross with Victor Young and His Orchestra.
