= Skott Freedman =

American singer, songwriter and musician (born 1983)

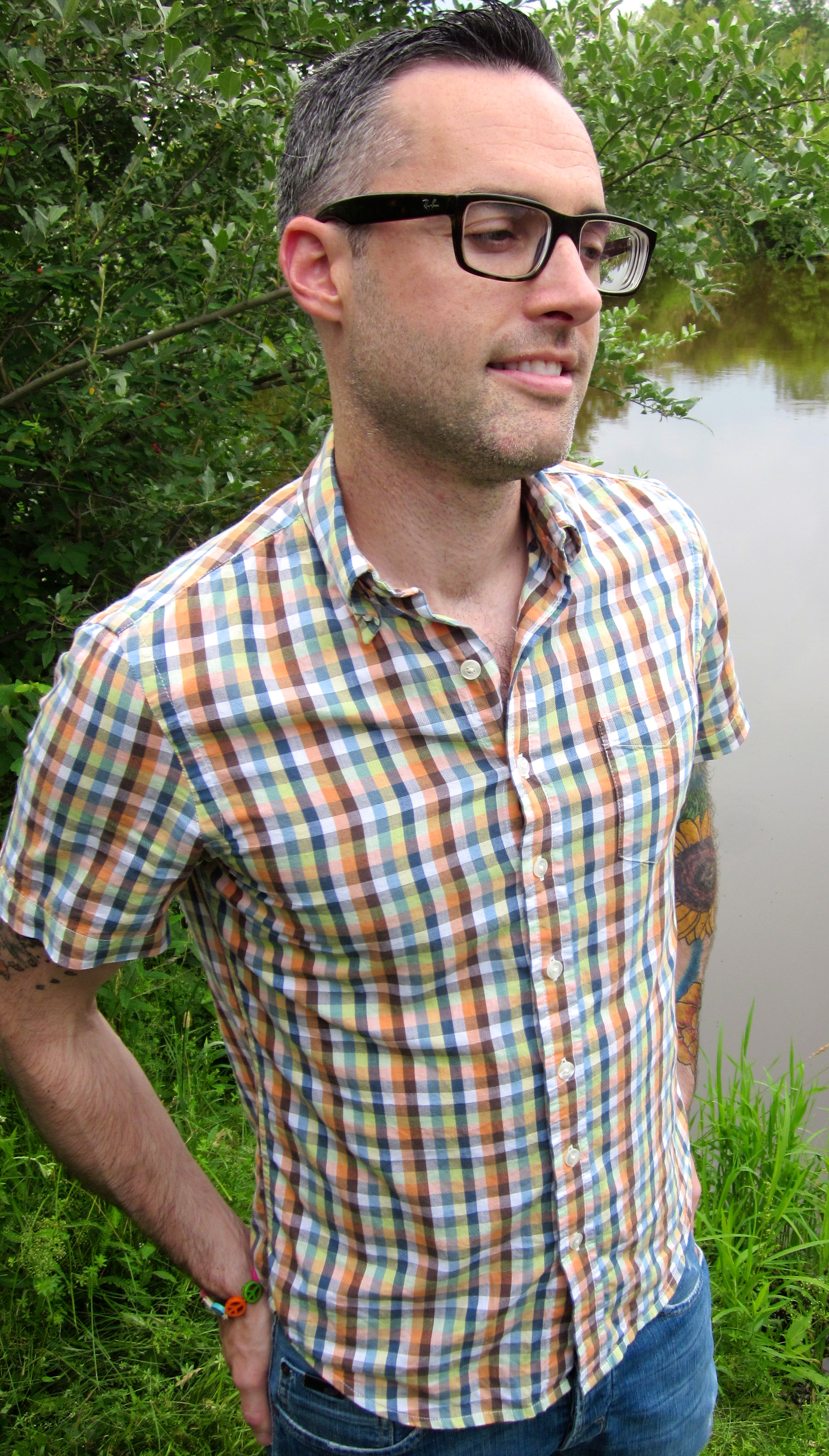
- Photo courtesy of Violent Yodel Records

Background information
- Born: Skott Elliot Freedman; March 22, 1983 (age 43); New Jersey, U.S.
- Origin: East Brunswick, New Jersey, U.S.
- Genres: Folk, pop
- Occupation: Musician
- Instruments: Vocals, piano, banjo
- Years active: 1996–present (solo career)
- Label: Violent Yodel Records
- Website: facebook.com/skottfreedman

Skott Freedman (born March 22, 1983) is an American singer, songwriter, and musician.

== Background ==
Freedman was born and raised in New Jersey. His music makes heavy use of the piano, which has led to regular comparisons with chanteuse Tori Amos. Similar to Amos, Freedman was a child piano prodigy and won statewide competitions while growing up. Freedman has said that repeated bouts of depression during his adolescence inspired him to write his first songs. He cites Joni Mitchell, Cat Stevens, Paula Cole, and Beethoven as major influences. Freedman's music blends pop and folk influences with a confessional lyrical style. His hallmark rapid staccato style is classically influenced (audio sample below). Freedman's first public performance was at the Butterfield Beanery in New Brunswick, NJ on April 26, 1996. He went on to formally study piano at Ithaca College in Ithaca, NY. Freedman has since been based out of Chicago, Boston, Charleston, and San Diego.

== Music ==
In 1999, Freedman released his first album Swimming After Dark on the independent label Violent Yodel Records. The debut was met with rave reviews, including a feature on Indie-music.com. "I've never heard anything like this. It's heartbreaking, passionate, and unabashedly honest. He [Freedman] lives in a beautiful world, even when it's painful, and I'm finding it hard to leave."

Following the success of his first album, Freedman released a follow-up album in 2001, Anything Worth Mentioning. His second release strayed from the intimate quality of Swimming After Dark and featured full-band arrangements, including an enigmatic banjo solo during the opening number. Critics hailed Freedman's sophomore release as proof the songwriter was maturing. Billboard Magazine gave Freedman a full page profile, dubbing the young pianist "a star-in-waiting." Freedman began nationally touring at that time, performing at colleges, festivals, and coffeehouses across the country.

Freedman returned to the studio in 2003 to record a third album, Some Company. Along with 10 new original numbers, the album included a popularly downloaded version of Marc Cohn's Walking in Memphis. Some Company was reminiscent of Freedman's early roots and consisted solely of vocal-piano numbers. Freedman's fan base began to expand about that time, spreading as far as Australia where Freedman toured for three months promoting the album. Billboard Magazine featured Freedman for the second time, and The Village Voice and The New York Times both wrote about Freedman's unique vocal and musical stylings. "In a husky voice similar to Marc Cohn's, he croons childhood memories and hopes of true love while the arpeggios ripple."

After the release of Some Company, Freedman began to field the idea of a cover album. In response to fan suggestions, Freedman posted 30 songs on his website where fans voted on which tracks to record. In 2005, the aptly titled Judge a Book was released featuring the top-voted tracks. Collaborations appeared for the first time including the controversial "Soldiers of Christ" by "I Kissed a Girl"'s Jill Sobule (who also sings on the track). A spin on The Magnetic Fields' "Papa Was a Rodeo" was recorded with singer-songwriter Mark Weigle, and indie singer-songwriter Edie Carey lent vocals to the pop-tinged "Good Morning Baby". A bonus track of The Cranberries' "Zombie", recorded on an old church organ in Charleston, SC, also appeared on the cover album. "Zombie" was subsequently released as a single in 2009, and featured in the 2016 finale of the popular Italian talent show, Amici di Maria De Filippi.

Freedman disappeared from the music scene between 2006 and 2010 in order to earn his Doctor of Philosophy in Language and Communicative Disorders from San Diego State University and the University of California, San Diego. At the urging of fans, Freedman released a fifth album in June 2009, The Cottage Sessions. The album was a collection of deeply personal songs including the final track "Stay", which bared Freedman's religious side for the first time.

Between 2011 and 2014, Freedman uploaded home video performances to his YouTube channel in order to maintain a connection to his fanbase.

== Discography ==
- Swimming After Dark (1999)
- Best Little Boy ep (2000)
- Anything Worth Mentioning (2001)
- Some Company (2003)
- Some Company single (2003)
- Judge a Book (2005)
- Zombie single (2009)
- The Cottage Sessions (2009)

== Personal life ==
Freedman received his Doctor of Philosophy in Language and Communicative Disorders from San Diego State University and the University of California, San Diego. He is currently an associate professor at his undergraduate alma mater, Ithaca College. Freedman is Jewish.
