= Ballad for Americans (album) =

Decca Presents Ballad for Americans Sung by Bing Crosby
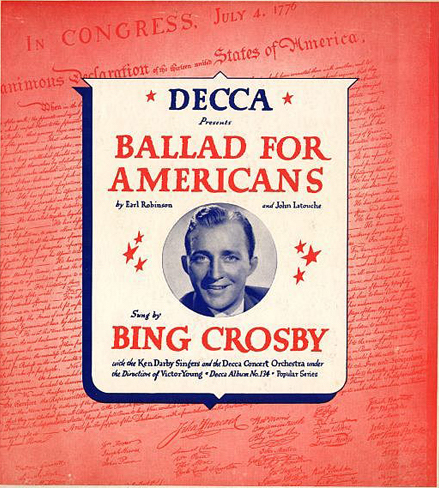

Studio album by Bing Crosby
- Released: 1940
- Recorded: 1940
- Genres: Popular, patriotic
- Label: Decca

Bing Crosby chronology
| George Gershwin Songs, Vol. One (1939) | Decca Presents Ballad for Americans Sung by Bing Crosby (1940) | Favorite Hawaiian Songs (1940) |

Ballad for Americans is debut solo studio album by American singer and actor Bing Crosby released in 1940 as a Phonograph record, featuring the popular "Ballad for Americans" sung by Crosby in an American-type patriotic style. In 1946, the two records in this album were put into a new album called What We So Proudly Hail. This was Crosby's first studio album that was not a reissue of earlier singles.

== Production ==
Crosby biographer Gary Giddins discussed the recording in his book Bing Crosby, A Pocketful of Dreams, The Early Years, 1903–1940:

Bing did not approach the project lightly. He studied the work before the session, and his concentration in the studio was painstaking; everything had to be right. In contrast to his usual speed (five tunes in two hours, rarely more than two takes), he devoted an hour to each of the four segments. If the reviews were not overtly political, political righteousness fueled the cheers of latecomers to the world of popular music.

== Track listing ==
These newly issued songs were featured on a 2-disc, 78 rpm album set, Decca Album No. A-134. "Ballad for Americans" was written by John Treville Latouche and Earl Robinson. Crosby's recordings were made on July 6, 1940, with the Ken Darby Singers and Victor Young's Decca Concert Orchestra.

Disc 1 (3297): "Part One" (2:26) / "Part Four" (3:06)
Disc 2 (3298): "Part Two" (2:16) / "Part Three" (2:24)
