= Michael Witney =

American actor (1931–1983)

- Born: November 21, 1931; Ticonderoga, New York, U.S.
- Died: November 30, 1983 (aged 52); New York City, New York, U.S.
- Occupations: Film and television actor: The Travels of Jaimie McPheeters
- Years active: 1963–1981
- Spouses: Donna (JoJo) Collette Bailey (m. 1956; div. 1976) Twiggy (m. 1977)
- Children: 1

Michael Witney (born Whitney Michael Moore Armstrong; November 21, 1931 – November 30, 1983) was an American film and television actor.

== Career ==
In 1963–64, Witney's first screen-acting role was a recurring part as the first wagon master, Buck Coulter, in the first 14 episodes of the ABC Western television series The Travels of Jaimie McPheeters. He guest-starred in other Western series, including four appearances between 1965 and 1971 on NBC's Bonanza and once on Daniel Boone, starring Fess Parker. He guest-starred as a cavalry captain in the 1965 episode "South Wind" of CBS's Gunsmoke.

In 1966, he appeared as Sergeant MacDonald in "Muted Fifes, Muffled Drums" of ABC's A Man Called Shenandoah, starring Robert Horton, and as Jared Hobson in the 1967 episode, "The Execution", of Dale Robertson's ABC Western series, The Iron Horse. He was cast as Wild Bill Hickok in the 1965 episode, "No Gun Behind His Badge", of the syndicated anthology series, Death Valley Days, with host Ronald Reagan playing Thomas J. "Bear River" Smith. Witney portrayed pioneer Peter Lassen in a 1968 Death Valley Days episode, "The Other Side of the Mountain", hosted by Robert Taylor.

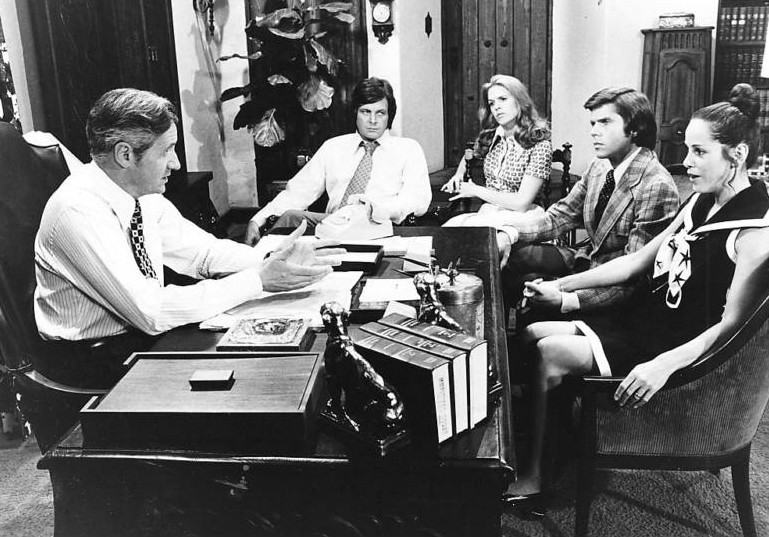
From left: Arthur Hill, Witney, Sharon Gless, John Davidson and Louise Sorel on ABC's Owen Marshall, Counselor at Law (1972)

In 1975, Witney was cast as Frank Ward in 10 of the 11 episodes of the BBC television series, Oil Strike North, a drama about the Triumph Oil Company and its attempt to extract petroleum from the North Sea. On December 30, 1965, Witney made a brief appearance as a sailor named Johnny who helped Zsa Zsa Gabor, who guest-starred in the #15 episode of the second season of Gilligan's Island entitled, "Erica Tiffany Smith to the Rescue". He also appeared in NBC's Star Trek episode "A Private Little War", playing Tyree, a friend of Kirk from years earlier and current leader of a band of Hill People. His last screen appearances were from 1978–1981 in different roles in three episodes of ABC's Charlie's Angels.

== Personal life ==
Witney married Donna (JoJo) Collette Bailey in 1956 in Helena, Montana. They divorced in 1976. He married the British model Twiggy in 1977; they had a daughter, Carly. Witney died in New York on November 30, 1983, nine days after his 52nd birthday. He died of a heart attack in a McDonald's where he had taken Carly to celebrate her fifth birthday.

Before his move to Los Angeles to pursue acting, Witney was a minor league pitcher for the Hornell Dodgers and the Great Falls Electrics.

== Filmography ==
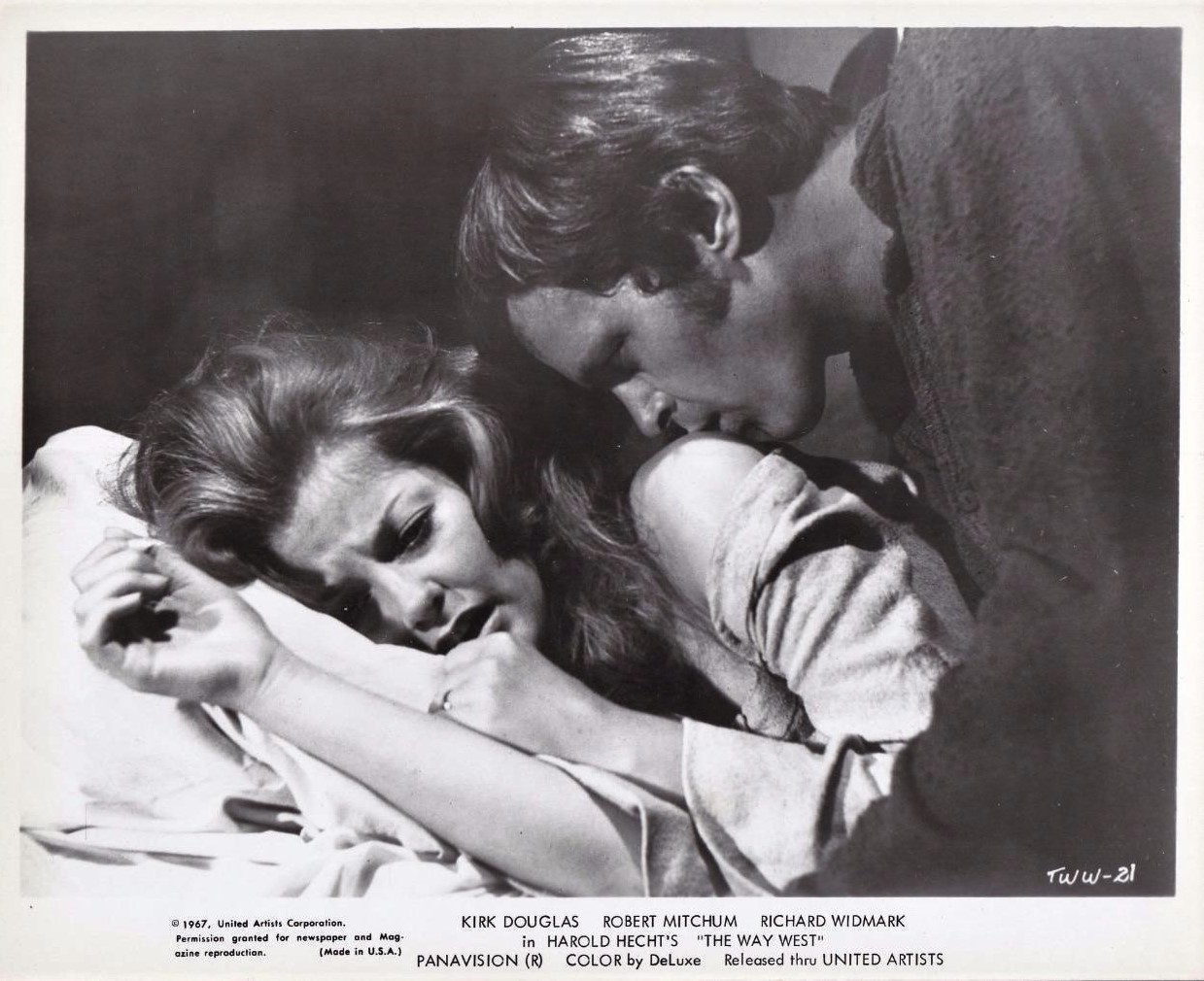
Katherine Justice and Michael Witney in The Way West, 1967

| Year | Title | Role | Notes |
|---|---|---|---|
| 1967 | The Way West | Johnnie Mack | |
| 1970 | Darling Lili | Lt. Youngblood Carson | |
| 1971 | Doc | Ike Clanton | |
| 1971 | Head On | Steve | |
| 1972 | The Catcher | Noah | TV movie |
| 1974 | W | Ben Lewis | |
| 1980 | There Goes the Bride | Bill Shorter | |
