= Ballad for Americans =

1939 cantata

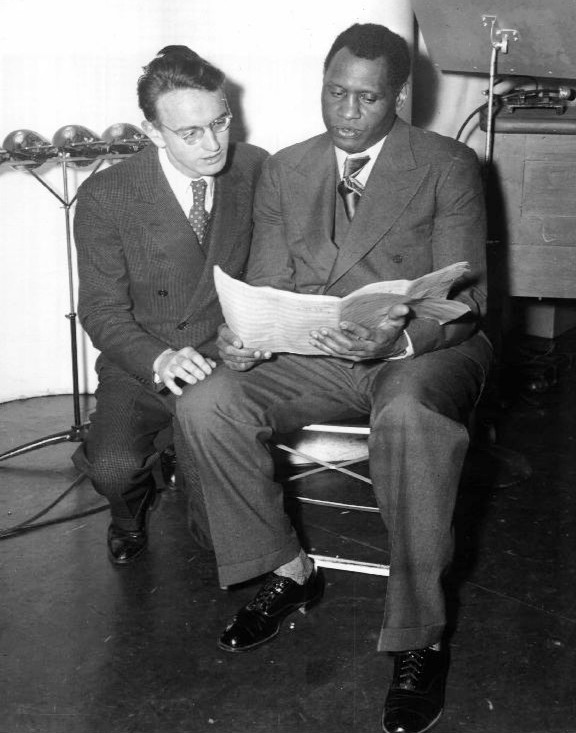
Earl Robinson and Paul Robeson at rehearsal for the song's performance.

"Ballad for Americans" (1939), originally titled "The Ballad for Uncle Sam", is an American patriotic cantata with lyrics by John La Touche and music by Earl Robinson. It was written for the Federal Theatre Project production, Sing for Your Supper that opened on April 24, 1939. Congress abolished the project on June 30, 1939. The "Ballad of Uncle Sam" had been performed 60 times.

Producer Norman Corwin then had Robinson sing "Ballad of Uncle Sam" for the CBS brass. CBS was impressed and hired Paul Robeson to perform the song. Corwin retitled the song "Ballad for Americans". Robeson and Robinson rehearsed for a week. On Sunday, November 5, 1939, on the 4:30 pm CBS radio show The Pursuit of Happiness, Robeson sang "Ballad for Americans". Norman Corwin produced and directed, Mark Warnow conducted, Ralph Wilkinson did the orchestration (in Robeson's key), and Lyn Murray handled the chorus. Robeson subsequently began to perform the song, beginning with a repeat on CBS on New Year's Eve. Robbins Music Corporation published the sheet music.

In 1940, RCA Victor recorded and released the song. Robinson recommended the American People's Chorus for the recording and he re-rehearsed them in Robeson's key. (Robinson had written the song to the key of E.) The recording was made on February 9, 1940, under the direction of RCA Victor music director Nathaniel Shilkret and issued as record album P-20. It was inducted into the Grammy Hall of Fame in 1980. Time magazine mentioned the album in the May 6, 1940, issue. On May 14, 1940, a full page ad for the records (a four-sided album on 78 rpm records) appeared in the New York Daily News. Each side of the album ended with the lyrics "You know who I am". By the end of 1940, the album had sold more than 40,000 copies.

On July 6, 1940, Bing Crosby recorded the song for Decca Records and it was also issued as a 2-disc set. MGM included the song as the finale of the 1942 movie Born to Sing (choreographed by Busby Berkeley and sung by Douglas McPhail). Jules Bledsoe, James Melton and others also performed the song. Lawrence Tibbett performed it on NBC for the Ford Hour. The British premiere was in September 1943 with the London Symphony Orchestra conducted by Hugo Weisgall.

In the 1940 presidential campaign it was sung at both the Republican National Convention (by baritone Ray Middleton) and that of the Communist Party. Its popularity continued through the period of World War II — in autumn 1943, 200 African American soldiers performed the piece in a benefit concert at London's Royal Albert Hall. After the war, Robeson transferred from Victor to Columbia Records. Victor responded by withdrawing Robeson's ballad from their catalogue. In 1966, Vanguard Records released Robeson's recording on a 33 1/3 rpm record. It has been periodically revived, notably during the United States Bicentennial (1976). There is also a well-known recording by Odetta, recorded at Carnegie Hall in 1960. Robeson's recording is currently available on CD.

Invoking the American Revolution (it names several prominent revolutionary patriots and quotes the preamble of the Declaration of Independence), and the freeing of the slaves in the American Civil War (there is a brief lyrical and musical quotation of the spiritual "Go Down Moses"), as well as Lewis and Clark, the Klondike Gold Rush, and Susan B. Anthony, the piece draws an inclusive picture of America: "I'm just an Irish, Negro, Jewish, Italian, French and English, Spanish, Russian, Chinese, Polish, Scotch, Hungarian, Litwak, Swedish, Finnish, Canadian, Greek and Turk and Czech and double-check American — I was baptized Baptist, Methodist, Congregationalist, Lutheran, Atheist, Catholic, Eastern Orthodox, Jewish, Presbyterian, Seventh-day Adventist, Mormon, Quaker, Christian Scientist — and lots more."

The lyrics periodically point at elite skepticism toward its inclusive American vision ("Nobody who was anybody believed it") before coming back to its refrain:

For I have always believed it,
And I believe it now,
And now you know who I am.
(Who are you?)
America! America!

Many performers of the ballad have made minor changes in the lyrics. For example, in the passage quoted above, the NYC Labor Chorus make several changes, including changing "Negro" to "African" and substituting "Jamaican" for "Litvak". Similarly, they add "Moslem" to the list of religions. In a passage near the end that begins "Out of the cheating, out of the shouting", Robeson in his 1940 recording adds "lynchings" to the list; the NYC Labor Chorus attempt to bring the piece up to date with:

Out of the greed and polluting,
Out of the massacre at Wounded Knee,
Out of the lies of McCarthy,
Out of the murders of Martin and John
