= Michael Cohen (American musician) =

American singer-songwriter

- Mike Cohen (1972) LP front cover picture
- Born: 1951
- Died: 1997 (aged 45–46)

Michael Cohen (1951 – November 1997) was an American singer-songwriter from New York City. He released three albums in the 1970s which were among the first to deal with explicitly gay themes. Cohen was licensed as a cab driver in New York City in 1972.

== Work and influences ==
Cohen self-released his first album, eponymously titled Mike Cohen, in 1972. This was followed by two albums on Folkways Records, What Did You Expect? (Folkways Records FS 8582, 1973) and Some of Us Had to Live (Folkways Records FS 8582, 1976). The latter two are available from Smithsonian Folkways. Cohen was influenced by Bob Dylan and Leonard Cohen. "The Last Angry Young Man", which opens What did You Expect?, deals with the misconceptions around homosexuality of the older generation while "Gone", from the same album, deals sensitively with the death of a gay friend. Frieze Magazine describes Cohen's "Bitterfeast" from the same album as a "raw and chokingly emotional" ballad based on a poem by Leonard Cohen. After releasing Some of Us Had to Live in 1976, Cohen "dropped off the radar" until his death in November 1997, following a decade-long battle with AIDS.

== Discography ==
1. Mike Cohen (1972)
2. What Did You Expect? (1973)
3. Some of Us Had To Live (1976)
