= Greyhound (band) =

- Origin: United Kingdom
- Genres: Reggae, pop
- Years active: 1968–1976
- Labels: Trojan, Mercury, Transatlantic

Greyhound were a British reggae band.

Greyhound began as the Rudies in the late 1960s, with core members Danny Smith and Freddie Notes. They also released material as the Tillermen and Des All Stars. Under the name the Rudies, they issued covers of "Patches" by Clarence Carter and "Montego Bay" by Bobby Bloom. Billed as Freddie Notes and the Rudies, "Montego Bay" peaked at number 45 on the UK Singles Chart in October 1970. After Notes's departure, Glenroy Oakley joined the band and they changed their name to Greyhound in 1970. Their first single was an Earl Robinson/David I. Arkin composition, "Black & White", which was a top ten hit on the UK Singles Chart. The song was also recorded by artists as diverse as the Maytones, Sammy Davis Jr and Three Dog Night. Two more singles, including a cover of Henry Mancini's "Moon River" followed, before the group's fame faded.

== Discography ==
=== Albums ===
- Black and White (Trojan, 1972)
- Leave the Reggae to Us (Mercury, 1975)
  - Mango Rock (retitled UK release of Leave the Reggae to Us) (Transatlantic, 1976)

=== Charting singles ===
- "Black and White" (1971) - UK No. 6, AUS No. 88
- "Moon River" (1971) - UK No. 12, AUS No. 95
- "I Am What I Am" (1972) - UK No. 20
- "Dream Lover" (1973) - UK No. 53, AUS No. 24
