= W (1974 film) =

1974 American suspense film directed by Richard Quine

- Directed by: Richard Quine
- Written by: Gerald Di Pego; James Kelley
- Story by: James Kelley; Ronald Shusett
- Produced by: Mel Ferrer
- Starring: Twiggy; Dirk Benedict; Michael Witney; Eugene Roche; John Vernon; Michael Conrad
- Cinematography: Gerald Hirschfeld
- Edited by: Gene Milford
- Music by: Johnny Mandel
- Production company: Bing Crosby Productions
- Distributed by: Cinerama Releasing Corporation
- Release date: June 27, 1974
- Running time: 95 minutes
- Country: United States
- Language: English

W (also titled I Want Her Dead and W Is the Mark of Death) is a 1974 American psychological thriller film directed by Richard Quine and starring Twiggy, Dirk Benedict and Michael Witney. It was produced by Mel Ferrer.

== Plot ==
Within 24 hours, three near-fatal accidents have occurred. At the scene of each, the letter "W" is scrawled over the injured person. Katie Lewis (Twiggy) and her husband Ben (Michael Witney) discover that these accidents are in fact the work of a mysterious killer, and that they are the real targets. While trying to avoid death, the couple must struggle to discover the source of these attacks.

== Cast ==
- Twiggy as Katie Lewis
- Michael Witney as Ben Lewis
- Eugene Roche as Charles Jasper
- Dirk Benedict as William Caulder
- John Vernon as Arnie Felson
- Michael Conrad as Lt. Whitfield
- Alfred Ryder as Investigator

== Filming ==
W was filmed at San Pedro Harbor and Trancas Beach, California, from April 30 to mid-June 1973.

== See also ==
- List of American films of 1974
