= Pieces of April (song) =

Single by Three Dog Night

from the album Seven Separate Fools
- B-side: "The Writing's on the Wall"
- Released: November 1972
- Genre: Soft rock
- Length: 4:09
- Label: Dunhill 4331
- Songwriter: Dave Loggins
- Producer: Richard Podolor

Three Dog Night singles chronology
"Black and White" (1972)	"Pieces of April" (1972)	"Shambala" (1973)

"Pieces of April" is a ballad written by Dave Loggins which became a top 20 hit for rock band Three Dog Night in January 1973.

== Three Dog Night version ==
First recorded by Loggins for his 1972 debut album Personal Belongings, "Pieces of April" was recorded for the 1972 Three Dog Night album Seven Separate Fools produced and arranged by Richard Podolor with Three Dog Night themselves credited as co-arrangers. According to Three Dog Night vocalist Chuck Negron, the group's two other vocalists Danny Hutton and Cory Wells left London where the Seven Separate Fools album was being recorded before the album was complete, necessitating Negron recording the album's final two tracks - which included "Pieces of April" - without them. As a result, "Pieces of April" became the second of two Three Dog Night singles not to feature all three of the group's vocalists, at least on background vocals, with the first being their inaugural Hot 100 single, 1969's "Try a Little Tenderness" sung by Wells.

Released in October 1972 as the follow-up to the No. 1 hit "Black and White", "Pieces of April" was an atypically delicate Three Dog Night track, being particularly distinct from the rollicking "Black and White", and "Pieces of April" would not become one of Three Dog Night's biggest hits, rising no higher than No. 19 on the Hot 100 in Billboard magazine whose Easy Listening hit ranking afforded "Pieces of April" a No. 6 peak. In Canada, "Pieces of April" ranked as high as No. 13 on the national hit parade featured in RPM magazine, whose Easy Listening survey ranked the track as high as No. 9. On the New Zealand Listener chart, it reached No. 12.

== Other versions ==
- The song's composer Dave Loggins had recorded "Pieces of April" for his 1972 debut album Personal Belongings from which it was released as a single in January 1973. That was the same month the Three Dog Night version reached the top 20, with Loggins' single release evidently being an attempt to generate a C&W hit. Loggins would remake "Pieces of April" for his final album, the 1979 release Dave Loggins, which was also released as a single and became an Easy Listening hit, ranking as high as No. 22 on the Billboard Adult Contemporary chart.
- Andy Williams recorded "Pieces of April" for his 1972 album Alone Again (Naturally).
- Johnny Mathis recorded "Pieces of April" in the 1972 sessions for his album Me and Mrs. Jones. The track was shelved and not released until 2017 when it was issued as a bonus track on the CD release of Me and Mrs. Jones, as well as on the box set entitled The Voice of Romance: The Columbia Original Album Collection.
- Twiggy recorded "Pieces of April" for her 1976 self-titled album.

== Legacy ==
The 2003 feature film Pieces of April starring Katie Holmes as the title character, was named after the song.
