= BBC Elstree Studios =

BBC Elstree Studios may refer to two facilities in Borehamwood, Hertfordshire:

- BBC Elstree Centre on Clarendon Road
- Elstree Studios (Shenley Road) former film studios used by the BBC
