= The Maytones =

The Maytones (sometimes known as The Mighty Maytones) are a Jamaican reggae vocal duo who were active between the late 1960s and until 1980.

== History ==
The Maytones formed in the late 1960s, and comprised Vernon Buckley and Gladstone Grant, both of whom lived in May Pen in Clarendon, which inspired the group's name. After recording two rocksteady tracks for Studio One which were not released, they recorded much of their early material for Alvin Ranglin, having local hits with "Loving Reggae" and "Funny Man", and released a version of Greyhound's "Black and White" (written by Earl Robinson and David I. Arkin) in 1971. They had further Jamaican hits with love songs such as "Preaching Love", "If Loving You Was Wrong", and "Brown Girl", before adopting a roots reggae style for tracks such as "Judas", "Babylon a Fall", and "Run Babylon". They had a major success with "Madness", recorded again for Ranglin, which was followed by an album of the same name. The success of the Mighty Diamonds prompted the group and producers Ranglin and Clement Bushay to promote the duo as the Mighty Maytones. The Boat to Zion album followed in 1978, although it did not meet with the success they had hoped for, and were overlooked by the British record labels that were signing up much of Jamaica's talent at the time, with their non-Rasta image identified as a factor. They contributed the track "Money Worries" to the Rockers soundtrack in 1979.

The duo came to an end in 1980 when Buckley moved to Canada. They reunited in the 2000s. Vernon issued a solo album, Raw, and has performed and recorded with Bedouin Soundclash.

== Discography ==
=== Albums ===
- Madness (1976), Burning Sounds
- Boat to Zion (1978), Burning Sounds
- The Mighty Maytones Album Showcase (1978), Funky Hut
- One Way (1979), GG's
- Tune In and Rock (Showcase Album), Pioneer International
- Keep the Fire Burning (1980), Third World
- Only Your Picture (1984), Vista Sounds
- Madness 2 (1995), Pioneer International

=== Compilations ===
- Best of the Mighty Maytones (1983), Burning Sounds
- Funny Man (1990), GG's
- Brown Girl in the Ring (1995), Trojan
- Lover Man (1997), Rhino
- Loving Reggae (2001), Charly
- Their Greatest Hits (2003), Heartbeat
