= Steven Grossman (musician) =

American singer-songwriter

- Born: September 1, 1951; Brooklyn, New York, United States
- Died: June 23, 1991 (aged 39) San Francisco, California, United States
- Occupation: Singer-songwriter
- Label: Mercury

Steven D Grossman (September 1, 1951 – June 23, 1991) was an American singer-songwriter. His debut album, Caravan Tonight (1974), is distinguished as being the first album dealing with openly gay themes and subject matter to be released on a major label (Mercury Records). Stephen Holden of Rolling Stone hailed it as "one of the most auspicious singer-songwriter debuts of the '70s."

Grossman was heavily influenced by Joni Mitchell and the album is very much in the style of singer-songwriter Cat Stevens, as opposed to the then-current glam Bowiesque fashion of openly gay artists such as Jobriath. Performers on the album included Eric Weissberg, best known for his recording "Dueling Banjos" for the 1972 movie Deliverance.

Grossman died in 1991, aged 39, of an AIDS-related illness. Caravan Tonight has yet to be released on CD although a cover version of the title track by model and occasional singer Twiggy has. Singer-songwriter Mark Weigle created a duet of "Out" with Steven Grossman on his Out of the Loop CD in 2002.

Grossman recorded a second album shortly before his death. The album, Something in the Moonlight, was released on CD in 2011.

== Discography ==
- Caravan Tonight (1974)
- Something in the Moonlight (2011)
