= EMI 2001 =

EMI 2001s on their last day in BBC Elstree Centre Studio C in July 1991. The last programme in the world to use EMI 2001s to record images was EastEnders

The EMI 2001 broadcast studio camera was an early, very successful British made Plumbicon studio camera that included the lens within the body of the camera. Four 30 mm tubes allowed one tube to be dedicated solely to producing a relatively high resolution monochrome signal, with the other three tubes each providing red, green and blue signals. Even though semiconductors were used in most of the camera, the highly sensitive head amplifiers still used thermionic valves in the first generation of the design.

== Design ==
Integrating the lens within the body of the camera had both positive and negative effects. On the positive side, it meant the optical nodal point of the camera was close to the centre of gravity, which could make operation easier and more instinctive when used on movable camera mounts such as pedestals. The downside was that lens manufacturers were limited to which lenses they could adapt to fit to the camera. This made the 2001 less attractive for outside broadcasts.

The 2001 was both heavy and large. The pull-out handles at each corner needed four people to safely move the camera with the lens in place. It also required a separate remote camera control unit and the cable connecting the two was over 2 inches thick. The standard servo-controlled studio zoom lens had a 5 to 50° horizontal angle of view, with a minimum focus distance of either 36 inches (J type) or 18 inches (K type).

=== Four-tube prism optics ===
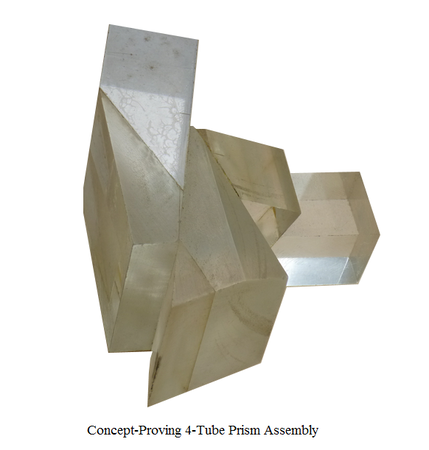
Early 'concept prism assembly', where the individual prisms were machined from Perspex

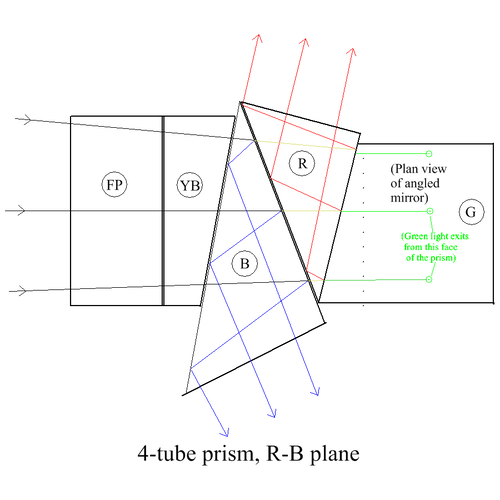
Plan view of the system in the plane of the Red-Blue channels

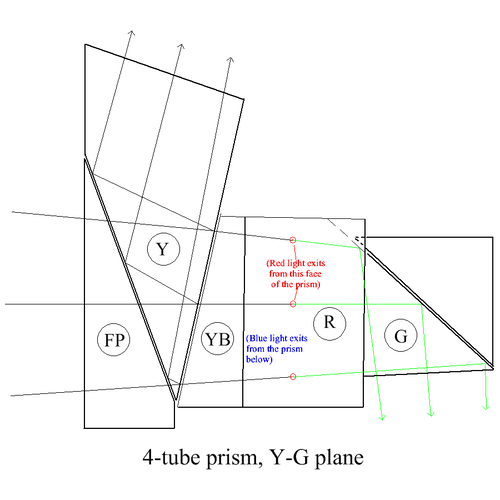
Plan view of the system in the plane of the Luminance-Green channels

The EMI 2001 used a four-way prism assembly to split the light into its components, using the same novel principles that had been developed by Philips for its three-way splitter. These new assemblies used the property of total internal reflection, within the prisms, to direct the light to the pick-up tubes. The techniques were described in a patent first filed in 1961. The three-way prism was also described in a description of the LDK3 camera.

The technique of using a prism assembly in this way was far superior to the earlier light-splitting arrangements, since the prism assembly was neat and compact and reproducibility in manufacture was much improved. The problems previously experienced with double imaging (common with plate glass dichroic mirrors) were also eliminated. Furthermore, because of the near-normal incidence of light onto the dichroic surfaces, sensitivity to polarised light was reduced.

Consequently, EMI chose to use a four-tube version of the prism splitter for its new colour camera, in order to retain all the advantages of the method. However, devising a single prism arrangement for four tubes was less easy than for three and several alternatives were initially considered.

In an early configuration of the prism block, shown in the thumbnail, three of the pick-up tubes were envisaged to be in a common plane, but with the fourth (red) tube sticking up, nearly at right angles to the other three. (This configuration was to be used in the Russian four-tube camera type KT-116M.)

For the final optical arrangement in the EMI 2001, the green prism was changed to have a fully silvered mirror at about 45 degrees, to deflect the green light sideways, resulting in the final four-spoke arrangement. (When viewed from the back of a camera the four tubes were seen as a diagonal cross). This optical arrangement defined the cross-section dimensions of the camera (which was not small – 380 × 380 mm), but it did allow the zoom lens to be located within the camera body. Also the removal of individual pick-up tubes was possible without any need to remove the scanning coils, as the tube bases were easily accessible at the outer corners.

=== Generating the image ===
The composite signals of the NTSC, PAL and SECAM systems are made up of a wideband luminance signal and two narrow-band colour difference signals containing B-Y and R-Y. If a band-limited version of the signal from the luminance tube is used to derive the colour difference signals, without modification, then colour errors would occur. This is because the luminance characteristic expected by the colour processing must be made up in a particular way, using specific proportions of red, green and blue, whereas the signal from the luminance tube has a more general monochromatic characteristic akin to that from a conventional black and white camera. In addition, the application of gamma correction to the signals further complicates the situation (display tubes have, approximately, a square law characteristic with γ ≈ 2.2).

As shown below, it is beneficial, but not sufficient, to shape the luminance response to simulate that of the NTSC (PAL or SECAM) luminance characteristic (by, for example, placing an optical filter in front of the luminance tube to pass light with the required luminosity function, or by a special dichroic surface which reflects light to the luminance tube with the required luminosity function).

For a basic 3-colour system the wideband luminance signal (Y'), for NTSC, PAL and SECAM, is given by:

$$Y' = 0.3R^{\frac{1}{\gamma}} + 0.59G^{\frac{1}{\gamma}} + 0.11B^{\frac{1}{\gamma}}$$

In the case of a separate luminance tube, with appropriate spectral shaping, the output signal (Y) is given by:

$$Y = 0.3R + 0.59G + 0.11B$$

which when gamma-corrected gives:

$$Y^{\frac{1}{\gamma}} = (0.3R +0.59G + 0.11B)^{\frac{1}{\gamma}}$$
$Y^{\frac{1}{\gamma}}$ does not equal $Y'$ except when R = G = B, which corresponds to neutral (grey) tones.

When deriving the two narrowband colour difference signals containing R_{N} and B_{N}, a bandlimited version of the luminance signal (y') is required, namely:

$$y' = 0.3R_N^{\frac{1}{\gamma}} + 0.59G_N^{\frac{1}{\gamma}} + 0.11B_N^{\frac{1}{\gamma}}$$

but the band limited signal from the luminance tube is:

$$y^{\frac{1}{\gamma}} = (0.3R_N +0.59G_N + 0.11B_N)^{\frac{1}{\gamma}}$$

As before, $y^{\frac{1}{\gamma}}$ does not equal $y'$. If the gamma corrected luminance signal $y^{\frac{1}{\gamma}}$ is simply used instead of y' then colour errors result which can be appreciable for saturated colours.

In the EMI 2001 a process known as Delta-L Correction is used to overcome this problem.

A band-limited luminance difference correction signal, ΔL is formed, where:

$$\Delta L = y^{\frac{1}{\gamma}}- y'$$

This narrowband signal is used to correct the wideband luminance channel at low frequencies, so the monochrome signal transmitted becomes:

$$Y^{\frac{1}{\gamma}} - \Delta L = Y^{\frac{1}{\gamma}} - (y^{\frac{1}{\gamma}}- y')$$

With this corrected luminance signal, the correct colour rendition is obtained, whilst still retaining the sharp luminance detail of a 4-tube camera. The narrowband R, G and B signals are gamma corrected and applied to a suitable matrixing circuit, to derive the correction. With grey scale scenes $y^{\frac{1}{\gamma}}$ = $y'$ and the signal reverts to that of the luminance tube only.

=== Transistor circuits – the ring-of-three ===
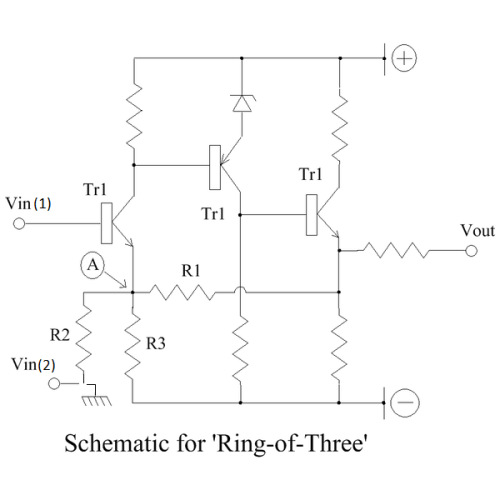
Ring-of-three amplifier circuit

The circuitry in the 2001 was all solid state apart from the pick-up tubes and, in the early cameras, the first stage of the head amplifiers. The circuitry made extensive use of the 'ring-of-three' amplifier configuration, shown simplified in the figure. This circuit was easily adapted for various uses.

In the normal, non-inverting mode, the bottom of resistor R2 is grounded and the input is via V_{in}(1). In this mode, the amplifier behaves somewhat like a 'current feedback amplifier'. The circuit maintains its bandwidth as the gain is increased (by reducing R2), unlike a conventional voltage feedback op. amp.

The circuit has a 'virtual earth' point at 'A' so that inverting or summing amplifiers are possible. In this mode, the base of TR1 is grounded and the input is via V_{in}(2) and the series resistor R2.

=== Band defining linear phase filters ===
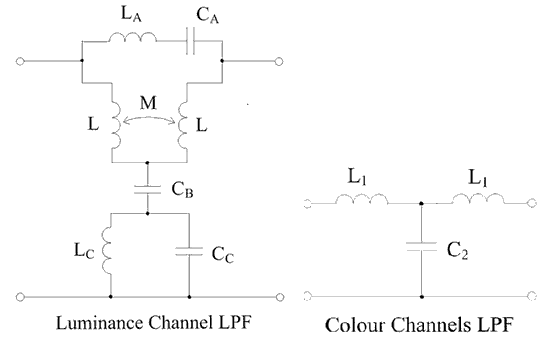
Band defining filter circuits

The EMI 2001 used band defining filters in all four channels. For the colour channels and narrow-band luminance, the low-pass filters had a Gaussian shaped pass-band and, although such filters were not 'sharp-cut', they were linear phase and gave negligible overshoots on transients. The wide-band luminance channel had its bandwidth defined by a linear phase low pass filter with a 3 dB cut-off at 6.8 MHz. Its design follows the lattice filter methods of Bode.

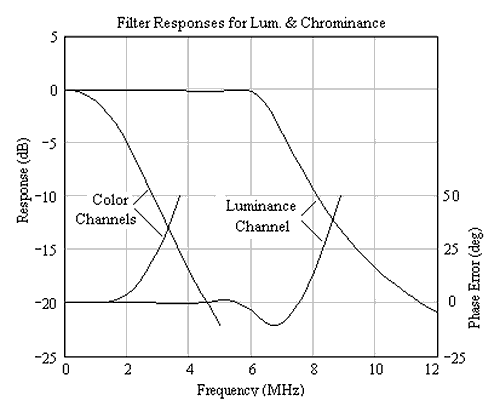
Band defining filter responses

The amplitude responses of the two filters are shown below. Also shown are the phase deviations of the two filters from the linear phase/frequency characteristic, given by:

$$\phi (f) = -6.36 \times 10^{-5} \times f$$

where f is the frequency in Hz and φ(f) is in degrees. At low frequencies, the propagation delays of the two filters are both the same (177 ns, approximately).

=== Comet tails and blooming ===
"Blooming" refers to the situation where bright areas in a picture 'bleed' into adjacent dark areas, with a consequential loss of picture sharpness and detail. The condition leads to "comet-tails" which streak across a picture, following moving highlights.

The pictures from early Plumbicon cameras were susceptible to comet tails and blooming and, although these effects had not been a major concern in the previous generation of cameras, which employed vidicon or image orthicon tubes, they were an annoying feature of Plumbicon tubes.

The problems arose when the beam current of a pick-up tube was insufficient to fully discharge the target in very bright areas of an image. Reducing the target voltage and increasing the beam current of the pick-up tube helped to mitigate the problem but, with early Plumbicons, this resulted in loss of resolution and increased lag.

This problem with Plumbicon tubes was already of concern in the early 1960s and all the early plumbicon cameras suffered from it, including the EMI 2001. With separate mesh tubes there was some improvement, because higher beam currents could be used without loss of resolution. Some cameras introduced anti comet-tail circuits to provide dynamic correction, when an overload was sensed (ACT circuits), but these were not used in the EMI 2001.

The problem was not satisfactorily resolved until the late 1960s when an extra 'anti-comet-tail' gun was introduced into Plumbicon tubes. New camera designs, produced in the 1970s, were able to include the new improved tubes, and usually did so. Some 2001 cameras were modified to take the new tubes, but it was a difficult retrofit procedure, because of the complexity of the additional circuitry.

=== ACT and the EMI 2001/1 ===
As supplied by EMI, the 2001 and the later 2001/1, did not have any form of ACT (anti-comet tail) or HOP (highlight overload protection). This is why its performance was poor in this respect, when compared with the next generation of cameras supplied in the 1970s. None of the first generation of true broadcast cameras in the middle to late 1960s had ACT, so the EMI 2001 was not unusual.

When observing old recordings, such as those from the 2001, it is very easy to tell if a programme used EMI 2001s (or any other first-generation PAL colour camera) to capture the images as the comet tails would often be coloured "blobs" or "splodges" (usually caused by a light source or light reflecting off a highly reflective or polished surface) simply because the camera did not have ACT circuits.

Some broadcasters modified their cameras to have ACT, but retrofitting ACT/HOP was not an easy modification as four new HOP camera tubes would be needed, the tube bases, wiring harness, four head amplifiers and four video amplifiers and the tube beam current boards would all have needed work done to them. ACT and HOP works by using an extra electrode in the tube to 'flood discharge' the target during the flyback period. Great care was needed in setting up the HOP voltages as damage to the tube's emission could occur. Once fitted, the ACT circuits were adjusted so that the comet tail didn't appear as a "blob".

Even when ACT circuits had been retro-fitted, comet tails would sometimes occur, consisting of either a mix of two separate colours, one colour inside the other (e.g. a comet tail that is red with a smaller comet tail inside that one that may be green), or the comet tail may be a non-primary colour, such as pink. The problems occurred when the settings of the ACT circuits were not well matched.

== Development ==
In 1963, prior to the development of the 2001, an experimental four tube camera was constructed by EMI engineers. This experimental camera had been inspired by RCA's new four tube camera, the TK-42, and used the same tube arrangement, i.e. a 4 1/2-inch (110 mm) image Orthicon tube in the luminance channel and three 1-inch (25 mm) Vidicon tubes in the colour channels. In addition, the experimental camera had an integrally mounted Varotal III zoom lens. It was demonstrated to the BBC in 1964 where it received a mixed reception. Pictures from the camera had disappointing colorimetry, but sharp luminance detail.

A production version of this camera was planned, the EMI 2000, but this camera was never built after the BBC had initially specified Vidicon tubes. Before production, the BBC changed policy to adopt the newly available Plumbicon tubes supplied by Philips, in the new camera, the EMI 2001, which delayed production as design revisions were necessary to accommodate the performance parameters of the new tubes in the circuits that they would be integrated with. After development delays, production quantities of this camera were not ready for the launch of the BBC's colour television service in 1967 and Marconi Mk VII four-tube cameras were urgently ordered. When the EMI 2001 was ready for production in early 1968, the Marconi Mk VII cameras the BBC ordered were moved to the weather, news and presentation studios in Television Centre (where movement would be less of an issue as camera operators had complained of discomfort from operating them with unusual postures). The BBC had also ordered Philips LDK3 three-tube cameras, mainly used for outside broadcasts and in some regional studios.

=== EMI's experimental 4-tube camera ===
EMI engineers visited the United States in 1963, in order to view RCA's new four-tube colour camera, the TK42. Immediately following this visit, EMI Research Labs. embarked on a program to build an experimental camera using the same format. The construction took only six weeks of intensive effort, aided by the cannibalization of parts from existing EMI cameras. Items were taken from an EMI Type 203 image Orthicon monochrome studio camera, for the luminance channel, and a Type 204 industrial colour camera, for the colour channels. This camera contained three Vidicon tubes and a colour-splitting system using plate glass dichroic mirrors. In addition, a Varotal III zoom lens was integrated into the body of the experimental camera. The camera was housed in a simple box-shaped structure with ribs of extruded aluminium and plain side panels.

The experimental camera was demonstrated to the BBC in 1963 where it received a mixed reception. At that time, the BBC was evaluating an early Philips three-tube camera which used some newly available Plumbicon pick-up tubes. (Note: The Plumbicon tube gave softer, less sharp, pictures than the image orthicon, but it was much smaller. To give acceptable results, this early Philip's camera used a low-pass filter in each channel, to reduce noise, together with crispening circuits to improve apparent sharpness.) It had been set up by BBC engineers to give highly saturated colour pictures and they were unimpressed by the 'tinted' pictures of the EMI camera.

In order to better judge the performance of the then existing cameras, the BBC organised comparison tests between the experimental EMI camera, a Philips camera and a Marconi three I.O. camera. In these tests, the colorimetry of the pictures from the EMI camera compared unfavourably with the other two, but it did give the sharpest pictures.

=== The development of the EMI 2001 ===
In spite of the BBC's lukewarm reception of the experimental camera EMI persisted with the four-tube concept, but now using Plumbicon tubes, as suggested by Wood although there was some delay before the work started. There were several reasons for the delay. Firstly, EMI's board hesitated to provide the financial investment needed for the project. Secondly, there was indecision regarding where to place the work but, eventually, the Colour TV Department of the Research Labs. was chosen in preference to the Broadcast Equipment Division (the existing supplier of EMI's monochrome cameras and studio equipment). Thirdly, there was concern regarding the reliability of supply of Plumbicon tubes, as Philips was the only supplier. (Note: A concern that had some merit because, originally, Philips' management planned to restrict the supply of Plumbicons solely to Philip's own camera group.) Fourthly, there were concerns regarding the variable quality standards of the early Plumbicon pick-up tubes, as some tubes were found to produce unstable pictures. Although most issues with tube quality were quickly resolved by Philips, there remained concerns regarding 'comet tails' and 'blooming'.

After the EMI board granted approval for the new camera, in late 1964, work on it progressed rapidly. The camera was to use four Plumbicon pick-up tubes and solid state circuitry, include a zoom lens as standard and to use prism optics. After the late start, the first fully operational prototype was shown to the BBC and others in 1966, only just in time to meet BBC time-scales for the introduction of its new colour service.

Early cameras used thermionic valves (vacuum tubes) in the first stages of the head amplifiers but later FET amplifiers were introduced, such cameras being designated type 2001/1. All other circuitry in the cameras, apart from the pick-up tubes, was solid state.

Sales of the Type 2001 were very successful in the UK. The BBC and many of the independent TV companies installed the cameras in their studios during the rapid expansion of the UK colour services after 1967. However, by the time EMI had fulfilled its UK orders (towards the end of the decade), the boom in the US market had been missed and the European market had yet to fully develop or was already dominated by Philips cameras. In addition, rival companies were already bringing out new designs and EMI now found only a limited market for a camera with a four-tube configuration.

== Operational history ==
First produced in 1966, by the early 1970s almost all of BBC Television's studios and many outside broadcast (OB) units were equipped with the 2001. Several ITV companies purchased or leased the camera including Thames Television, Yorkshire Television, Associated Television/Central Independent Television, Granada, HTV, Anglia, London Weekend Television and Independent Television News. Independent outfits such as the early cable television stations Rediffusion Cablevision, Sheffield Cablevision and the educational television arm of the Inner London Education Authority also purchased the camera.

When sold abroad, the EMI 2001 was carried under the Thomson SA brand – hence "Thomson TH.T 2001". How this came about is unknown as EMI and Thomson SA did not have business links.

The Thomson 2001s, like the EMIs, also used Plumbicons; however, due to a brochure which was printed in French, it was presumed that they used Vidicon tubes. But, apart from the silver viewfinder squares (instead of white) and the brand name change on the front and sides, the cameras were the same.

In the United States, the cameras were marketed by International Video Corporation as the IVC/EMI 2001-B (four tubes), with another version, the IVC/EMI 2001-C, consisting of three tubes. Only one U.S. station is known to have purchased the 2001: WSNS-TV in Chicago, in the early years of its operation.

Although there was no predicted lifespan for the camera, the heavy hot-running four-tube design was considered somewhat outdated even when it was new, which contributed to the camera's near-total failure to sell to broadcasters outside the UK. Furthermore, when EMI closed-down the Broadcast Equipment Division in the late 1970s, studios were deprived of technical and spares support for their cameras. Consequently, several ITV companies began replacing them in the late-1970s with the last commercial operators (Yorkshire & Central) both phasing them out in 1986 (in the main, Central had disposed of them in 1984, however they were used for continuity and presentation from its Birmingham operation until 1986). However the BBC kept a number of such cameras in operation at BBC Television Centre, its various regional outposts and its BBC Elstree Centre for some years afterwards, the last being at Elstree until July 1991; they were kept running by "cannibalising" identical cameras left behind by Central when the BBC purchased Elstree from it in 1984 as well as BBC EMI 2001s disposed of in previous years.

== Zoom lenses for the 2001 ==
Rank Taylor Hobson declined to offer a zoom lens for EMI's new camera, claiming it was fully committed elsewhere, but Angenieux (see Pierre Angenieux) expressed its interest in supplying zoom lenses for the project. The French company offered two zoom lenses for the camera; the first was a 10:1 zoom for studio use and the second a larger unit for outside broadcasts. Both could be accommodated within the body of the camera, although the O.B. lens did protrude a little.

To accommodate a four-way prism splitter, extra distance was needed from the back of the lens to the image focal plane, when compared with a three-tube splitter. This set severe demands for the lens designer, but Angenieux was able to achieve EMI's requirements, provided that field flattening lenses were fitted in front of each pick-up tube. Early cameras used this arrangement, but with later zoom designs these lenses became unnecessary.

The servo motors and the servo amplifiers were supplied by Evershed Power Optics. The driver amplifiers for the servo motors were mounted in the camera body alongside the lens. The servo-driven zoom lens and the associated amplifier circuitry added considerably to the weight of the camera. In addition, incorporating the servo drivers within the camera body precluded the use of other makes of zoom lens.

=== Benefits of an integral zoom lens ===
The integral zoom lens was a popular feature of the EMI 2001, which was liked by camera operators, and it was sometimes referred to within the television industry as "the cameraman's camera". With no protruding zoom lens, the studio camera was only 537mm long enabling it to be used in small spaces and to be panned very easily (it had a low moment of inertia). In addition, pictures produced while panning had a more natural look. The operational flexibility of the camera was demonstrated in training videos.

Although the integral zoom lens camera was popular within the UK, this concept had little influence on designs or sales of cameras elsewhere. Only Marconi with its small neat Mk VIII and the cameras from Link a few years later followed the concept. Most camera manufacturers claimed that a format where the lens protrudes out in front of the camera gave a greater choice of lens supplier and, of course, it was a format that made life easier for camera designers, so the enthusiasm of camera operators for the integral zoom concept was found to have little long term influence on designers. Even EMI abandoned the notion of having an integral zoom lens, with its new camera, the Type 2005, which had a format reminiscent of the very earliest Philips experimental camera, with its three horizontally configured tubes.

== See also ==
Four-tube television camera
