= Black and White (Pete Seeger song) =

Song by Three Dog Night

Single by Three Dog Night

from the album Seven Separate Fools
- B-side: "Freedom for the Stallion"
- Released: August 1972
- Genre: Pop
- Length: 3:51 (album); 3:24 (single)
- Label: Dunhill
- Songwriters: David I. Arkin, Earl Robinson
- Producer: Richard Podolor

Three Dog Night singles chronology
"The Family of Man" (1972)	"Black and White" (1972)	"Pieces of April" (1972)

"Black and White" is a song written in 1954 by David I. Arkin (lyricist and father of actor Alan Arkin) and Earl Robinson (music). It was first recorded by Pete Seeger featuring a black child, in 1956 from the album Love Songs for Friends & Foes.

The most successful recording of the song was the pop version by Three Dog Night in 1972, when it reached number one on both the Billboard Hot 100 and Billboard Easy Listening charts. Billboard ranked it as the number 63 song for 1972. Danny Hutton sang the lead vocals with a children's chorus adding their voices to the song. This was the opening theme to the pilot episode of Mrs. Munger's Class.

== Early recordings ==
Following Seeger's version, the song's co-writer Earl Robinson released his own recording in 1957, on the Folkways album A Walk in the Sun and other Songs and Ballads. (The album title refers to a song written for the 1945 film A Walk in the Sun.) Sammy Davis Jr. released his version also in 1957.

Reggae groups the Maytones, from Jamaica, and Greyhound, from the UK, both recorded the song in 1971, the latter achieving a top ten hit on the UK Singles Chart at No. 6.

Having heard the Greyhound version, Three Dog Night covered the song and included it on their 1972 album Seven Separate Fools. Their version, which featured a group of children, peaked at number one on the U.S. Pop chart on September 16, 1972, and topped the Easy Listening chart on October 7. Billboard ranked it as the number 63 song for 1972. The album version featured a freely spoken recitation by Danny Hutton in the coda section of the song.

=== Other versions ===
Inner Circle recorded a cover for their 1989 album Identified.

== Meaning ==
The song was inspired by the United States Supreme Court decision of Brown v. Board of Education (1954), which outlawed racial segregation of public schools.

The original lyrics of the song opened with this verse, in reference to the court:

Their robes were black, their heads were white,
The schoolhouse doors were closed so tight,
Nine judges all set down their names,
To end the years and years of shame.

However, the versions of the song recorded by Greyhound and subsequently by Three Dog Night did not include this verse, making the song more universal and less historically specific.

== Charts ==
=== Weekly charts ===
Three Dog Night version

Chart (1972–73)	Peak position
Australia Kent Music Report	21
Austria (Ö3 Austria Top 40)	8
Canada Top Singles (RPM)	1
Canada RPM Adult Contemporary	1
New Zealand (Listener)	1
US Billboard Hot 100	1
US Billboard Adult Contemporary	1
US Cash Box Top 100	1

=== Year-end charts ===
Chart (1972)	Rank
Canada (RPM)	12
US Billboard Hot 100	63
US Cash Box Top 100	42

== Certifications ==
Region	Certification	Certified units/sales
United States (RIAA)	Gold	1,000,000^{^}
^{^} Shipments figures based on certification alone.

== See also ==
- List of Hot 100 number-one singles of 1972 (U.S.)
- List of number-one adult contemporary singles of 1972 (U.S.)
