= Earl Robinson =

American folk singer and songwriter (1910–1991)

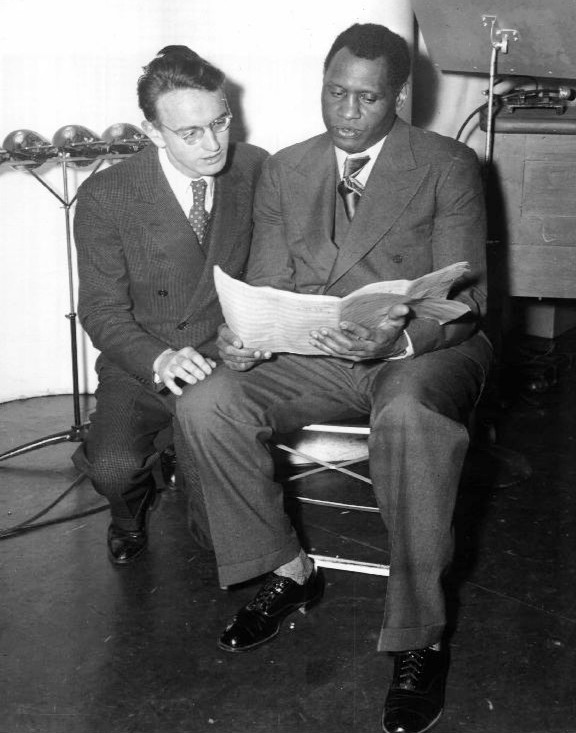
- Robinson (left) and Paul Robeson rehearsing for the first performance of "Ballad for Americans", 1939
- Born: July 2, 1910; Seattle, Washington, U.S.
- Died: July 20, 1991 (aged 81); Seattle, Washington, U.S.
- Education: University of Washington (BM)
- Occupations: composer; arranger; singer-songwriter
- Years active: 1930s–1991
- Notable work: "Ballad for Americans"; "Joe Hill"; "Black and White"
- Style: Folk
- Children: Perry Robinson

Earl Hawley Robinson (July 2, 1910 – July 20, 1991) was an American composer, arranger, and folk singer-songwriter from Seattle, Washington. Robinson is remembered for his music, including the cantata "Ballad for Americans" and songs such as "Joe Hill" and "Black and White", which expressed his left-leaning political views. He wrote many popular songs and music for Hollywood films, including his collaboration with Lewis Allan on the 1940s hit "The House I Live In" from the Academy Award–winning film of the same name. He was a member of the Communist Party from the 1930s to the 1950s.

The jazz clarinetist Perry Robinson (1938–2018) was his son.

== Career in music ==
Robinson studied the violin, viola, and piano as a child and studied composition at the University of Washington, receiving a BM and teaching certificate in 1933. While at Washington, Robinson was a member of Phi Mu Alpha Sinfonia, a men's music fraternity. In 1934, he moved to New York City where he studied with Hanns Eisler and Aaron Copland. He was also involved with the Depression-era WPA Federal Theatre Project, was actively involved in the anti-fascist movement, and was the musical director at the communist-run Camp Unity in upstate New York. In the 1940s, he worked on film scores in Hollywood until he was blacklisted for being a communist. Unable to work in Hollywood, he moved back to New York, where he headed the music program at Elisabeth Irwin High School, directing the orchestra and chorus.

== Musical works ==
Robinson's musical influences began with both classical music and American folk music and included individuals such as Carl Sandburg, Woody Guthrie, Lead Belly, Paul Robeson, and Pete Seeger. He composed "Ballad for Americans" (lyrics by John La Touche), which became a signature song for Robeson after it was broadcast on CBS in November 1939. It was also recorded by Bing Crosby, Lawrence Tibbett, and Odetta. In 1936, Robinson wrote and performed "Joe Hill", also known as "I Dreamed I Saw Joe Hill Last Night", a setting of a poem by Alfred Hayes, a fellow staff member at Camp Unity. The song became a popular labour anthem and was recorded by Robeson, Pete Seeger, and Joan Baez, among others. It was used in the 1971 film Joe Hill, directed by Bo Widerberg.

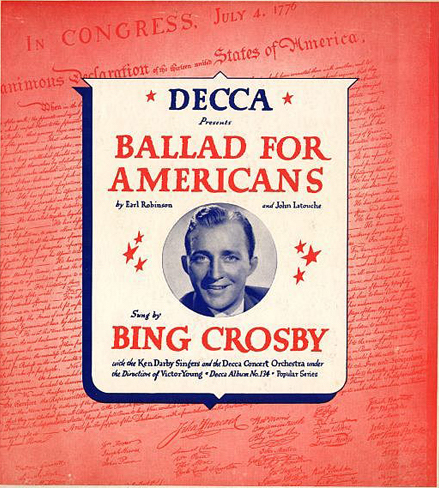
Bing Crosby, Ballad for Americans (Decca, 1940)

In 1942, Robinson wrote the music for a cantata (or "ballad opera") on the life and death of Abraham Lincoln, entitled The Lonesome Train (text by Millard Lampell). It was recorded in 1944 by Burl Ives and performed live in 2009 for the first time since the spring of 1974, when it was performed publicly at Mesabi Community College in Virginia, Minnesota, as the headliner for the Mesabi Creative Arts Festival. The 2009 performance was in celebration of the 200th anniversary of Lincoln's birth. Also with Lampell, he wrote the ongoing ballad that accompanied the 1945 Lewis Milestone film A Walk in the Sun. With Lewis Allan, in 1942, Robinson wrote "The House I Live In", a hit recorded by Frank Sinatra in 1945 and later by others.

During the blacklist period, Robinson wrote the music for and sang in the short documentary film Muscle Beach (1948), directed by Joseph Strick and Irving Lerner. Robinson co-wrote the folk musical Sandhog with blacklisted screenwriter Waldo Salt. It is based on St. Columbia and the River, a story by Theodore Dreiser about the tunnel workers, known as "sandhogs", who built the first tunnel under the Hudson River. The musical debuted at the Phoenix Theatre in New York on November 23, 1954. In 1954, Robinson also wrote "Black and White" with David I. Arkin, the late father of actor Alan Arkin, a celebration of that year's Brown v. Board of Education decision. The song was first recorded by Sammy Davis Jr. in 1957 and later by Pete Seeger, the folk-rock group Three Dog Night, the Jamaican reggae band The Maytones, and the UK reggae band Greyhound. The Three Dog Night version was a No. 1 pop hit in 1972.

Robinson's late works included a concerto for banjo, as well as a piano concerto entitled The New Human. His cantata "Preamble to Peace", based on the preamble to the United Nations Charter, was first performed in October 1960 by the Greater Trenton Symphony Orchestra and a chorus, with Eleanor Roosevelt in attendance; it was also performed by the Elisabeth Irwin High School Chorus and the Greenwich Village Orchestra.

He was killed at the age of 81 in a car accident in his hometown of Seattle in 1991.
