= David I. Arkin =

American teacher and lyricist (1906–1980)

David Arkin
- Born: December 19, 1906; New York, U.S.
- Died: October 8, 1980 (aged 73); Los Angeles, California, U.S.
- Known for: "Black and White"
- Children: 3, including Alan Arkin
- Relatives: Adam Arkin and Matthew Arkin (grandsons)

David I. Arkin (December 19, 1906 – October 8, 1980) was an American teacher, painter, writer, lyricist, and the father of actor Alan Arkin.

== Early life ==
Arkin was born in New York, the son of Russian-Jewish immigrants, Arthur Eleazer and Fannie Krinsky Arkin.

== Career ==
In 1945, Arkin moved his family to Los Angeles, California to take a teaching job. Arkin attempted to obtain work in the entertainment industry, but was unsuccessful. An eight-month Hollywood strike cost Arkin a set designer job, but the greater blow was as a result of the McCarthy "witch hunt". Arkin, a leftist, was accused of being a communist but refused to answer questions regarding his political affiliation. As a result, he was fired from his teaching job and was unable to gain work in Hollywood. Arkin challenged his dismissal, but did not achieve vindication until after his death, when a judge ruled that though the firing was legal at time, Arkin should have been considered for reinstatement when the school board changed its policy in 1968. He died of cancer in October, 1980, at the age of 73 at his home in Silverlake, California.

Arkin's most memorable song-writing contribution was in creating the lyrics to the song "Black and White", with music by Earl Robinson in 1954. The song was written to celebrate the United States Supreme Court decision of Brown v. Board of Education striking down racial segregation in public schools.

"Black and White" has been recorded by Pete Seeger, Sammy Davis Jr, Greyhound, The Maytones and Three Dog Night. The lyric has been the basis of an illustrated book by Arkin, which was first published in 1966. More recent editions feature a new introduction by Pete Seeger.

== Personal life ==
Arkin and his wife, Beatrice Wortis, had two sons, actor Alan Arkin and bass musician Bobby Arkin, and a daughter, author Bonnie Cordova.
