= Mark Weigle =

American singer-songwriter

Mark Weigle (born 1967 in Annandale, Minnesota) is an American singer/songwriter. At the 2003 Outmusic Awards, Weigle received five Outmusic nominations and won in three categories, including: "Outsong of the Year", "Outstanding New Recording", and "Outstanding Producer".

His 1998 debut album, The Truth Is, included low-key compositions in a country/folk style, such as "The Two Cowboy Waltz". His 2003 album, Different and the Same, included adaptations of others' songs, such as "867-5309/Jenny" (Weigle's version changed the name and gender of the song's subject to "867-5309/Jimmy"), and "Love Song To A Stranger".

== Discography ==
- 1998 - The Truth Is
- 2000 - All That Matters
- 2002 - Out of The Loop
- 2003 - Different and the Same
- 2005 - SoulSex (Wrestling the Angel/Versatile)
- 2007 - Mark Weigle

== Collaborations ==
In 2004, Weigle sang a duet with indie singer-songwriter Skott Freedman on the Magnetic Fields' song "Papa Was a Rodeo". The version appears on Freedman's 2004 release, Judge a Book.
