= Twiggy =

British model, actress and singer (born 1949)

Dame Lesley Lawson DBE
- Twiggy
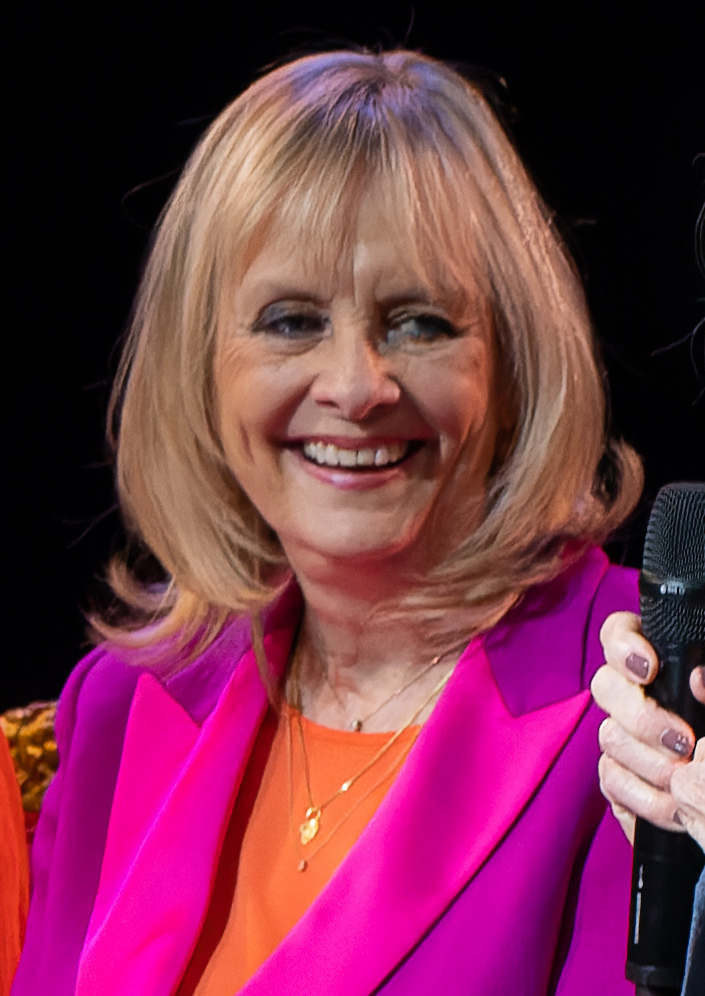
- Twiggy in 2023
- Born: Lesley Hornby; 19 September 1949 (age 77); Neasden, Middlesex, England
- Occupations: Model; actress; singer
- Years active: 1966–present
- Spouses: Michael Witney (m. 1977; died 1983) Leigh Lawson (m. 1988)
- Children: 1
- Modelling information
- Height: 5 ft 6 in (168 cm)
- Hair colour: Blonde
- Eye colour: Blue
- Agency: Models 1

Dame Lesley Lawson (née Hornby; born 19 September 1949), known professionally as Twiggy, is an English model, actress, and singer. Regarded as a British cultural icon, she rose to fame as a teenage model during London's Swinging Sixties and became one of the first international supermodels. In the following decades, she successfully expanded her career into acting and singing.

As a model Twiggy was known for her thin build and androgynous appearance, her big eyes, long eyelashes, and short hair. She was named "The Face of 1966" by the Daily Express and voted British Woman of the Year; her fame had spread worldwide by 1967, notably modelling in France, Japan, and the United States. She became disillusioned with the industry and temporarily retired in 1970, shifting focus onto her ongoing entertainment career.

Twiggy is one of the first international supermodels and a fashion icon of the 1960s. Her greatest influence is Jean Shrimpton, whom Twiggy considers to be the world's first supermodel. She has said she based her "look" on Pattie Boyd. Twiggy herself has been described as the successor to Shrimpton.

Twiggy's first leading role in the musical comedy The Boy Friend (1971) won her two Golden Globes for Best Actress and New Star of the Year. She recorded material across the late 1960s, but it was her self-titled debut album (1976) that yielded chart success, peaking at number 33 on the UK Albums Chart. Three of her singles entered the UK Singles Chart, including her cover of "Rings". She made her Broadway debut in the musical My One and Only (1983), for which she received a Tony nomination for Best Actress in a Musical.

Twiggy worked on several autobiographies and exhibits, including Twiggy in Black and White (1998), which entered the best-seller lists. She served as a judge on the reality show America's Next Top Model (2005–2007) and concurrently returned to modelling, working for Marks and Spencer and attributing to the company's successful revival.

== Early life ==
Lesley Hornby was born on 19 September 1949 and raised in Neasden (originally in Middlesex, now a suburb of north-west London). She was the third daughter of Nellie Lydia (née Reeman), a factory worker for a printing firm, and William Norman Hornby, a carpenter and joiner from Lancashire. Their first daughter, Shirley, had been born 15 years earlier; their second, Vivien, had been born 7 years earlier. According to Twiggy, her maternal grandfather was Jewish. However, her mother's genealogy, which was examined on the series Who Do You Think You Are? in 2014, does not contain Jewish ancestry.

Twiggy's mother taught her to sew from an early age. She used this skill to make her own clothing. She attended the Brondesbury and Kilburn High School.

== Modelling career ==
=== 1966–1970 ===
In January 1966, aged 16, she had her hair coloured and cut short in London by Leonard of Leonard of Mayfair. The hair stylist was looking for models on whom to try out his new crop haircut and he styled her hair in preparation for a few test head shots. A professional photographer Barry Lategan took several photos for Leonard, which the hairdresser hung in his salon. Deirdre McSharry, a fashion journalist from the Daily Express, saw the images and asked to meet the young girl.

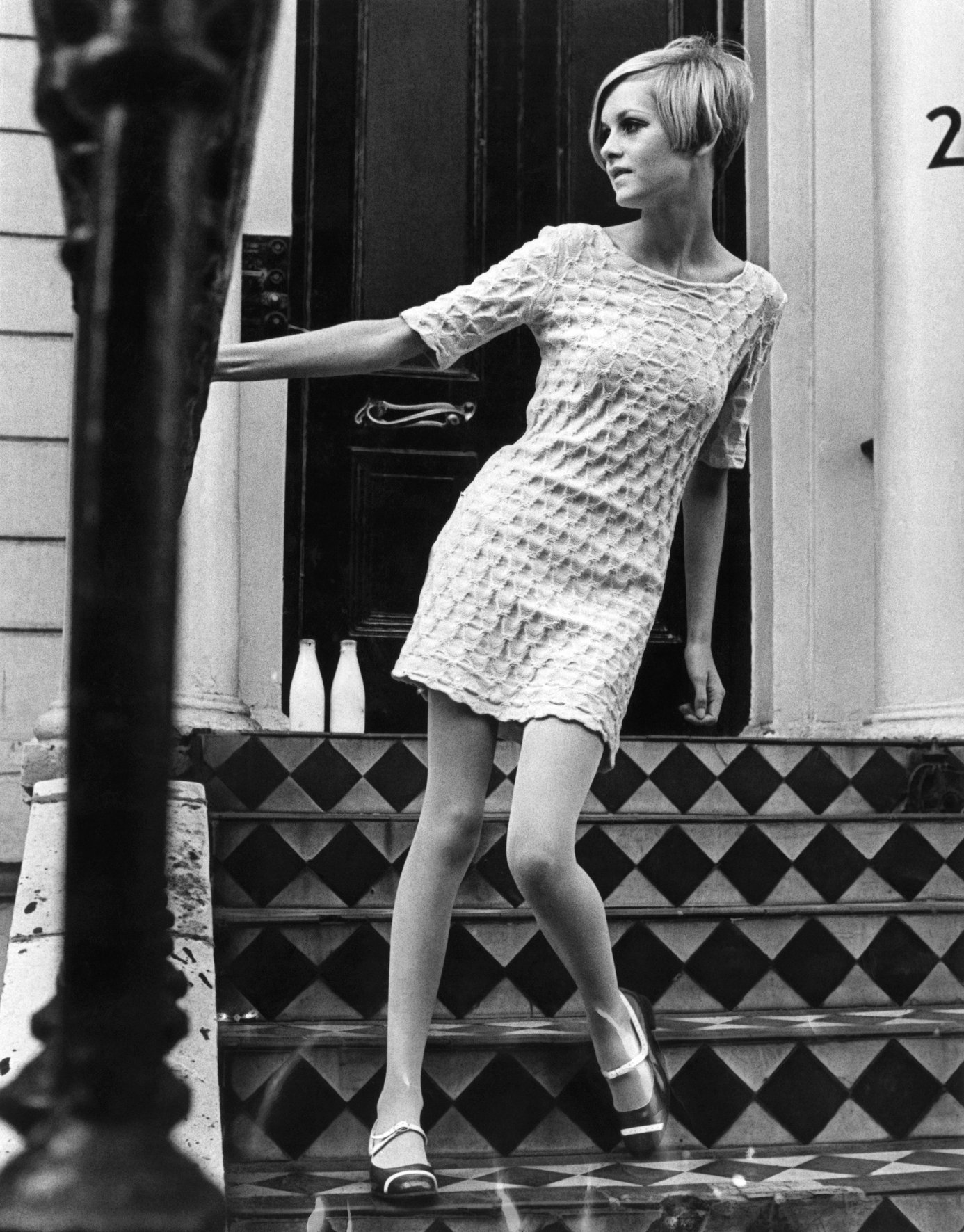
Twiggy outside her North London home, 1966.

McSharry arranged to have more photos taken. A few weeks later, the publication featured an article and images of Hornby, declaring her "The Face of '66". In it, the copy read: "The Cockney kid with a face to launch a thousand shapes... and she's only 16".

Hornby's career quickly took off. She was short for a model at 5 ft 6 in (1.68 m), weighed six point five stone (41 kg; 91 lb) and had a 31–23–32 (79–58–81 cm) figure, "with a new kind of streamlined, androgynous sex appeal".

Her hairdresser boyfriend, Nigel Davies, became her manager, changed his name to Justin de Villeneuve, and persuaded her to change her name to Twiggy (from "Twigs", her childhood nickname). De Villeneuve credits himself for Twiggy's discovery and her modelling success, and his version of events is often quoted in other biographies. In her 1998 book Twiggy In Black and White, she says that she met Justin through his brother, when she worked as a Saturday girl at a hairdressers in London. This is where she began to see the models in the magazines, but never thought she could do something like that. Jean Shrimpton was her idol, so she grew her hair long to look like her, before having to have it cut off for her headshots by Barry Lategan. Ten years her senior, De Villeneuve managed her lucrative career for seven years, overseeing her finances and enterprises during her heyday as a model.

One month after the Daily Express article, Twiggy posed for her first shoot for Vogue. Since then she has appeared on the cover of Vogue (and numerous international editions) 14 times.

Twiggy was soon seen in all the leading fashion magazines, commanding fees of £80 an hour, bringing out her own line of clothes called "Twiggy Dresses" in 1967, and taking the fashion world by storm. "I hated what I looked like," she said once, "so I thought everyone had gone stark raving mad." Twiggy's look centred on three qualities: her stick-thin figure, a boyishly short haircut and strikingly dark eyelashes. Her signature look was achieved in part by applying three layers of false eyelashes.

Twiggy in 1967, at the height of her early modelling career, showing the look that made her famous.

Twiggy arrived in New York City in March 1967 at Kennedy Airport, an event covered by the press. The New Yorker, Life and Newsweek reported on the Twiggy "phenomenon" in 1967, with the New Yorker devoting nearly 100 pages to the subject. An editorial in the edition of 15 March of Vogue described her as an "extravaganza that makes the look of the sixties". Twiggy was, according to feminist critic Linda Delibero, "the most visible commodity Britain produced that year, and [America] generously complied with the hype, scarfing up skinny little Twiggy pens, Twiggy lunch boxes, Twiggy lashes, an assortment of Twiggy-endorsed cosmetics". That year she became an international sensation, modelling in France, Japan and America, and landing the cover of Paris Vogue in May, the cover of US Vogue three times, in April, July and November, and the cover of British Vogue in October.

Twiggy has been photographed by such noted photographers as Cecil Beaton, Richard Avedon, Melvin Sokolsky, Ronald Traeger, Bert Stern, Norman Parkinson, Annie Leibovitz and Steven Meisel.

On 10 December 1969, despite being 20 years old, Twiggy was selected as the subject for one of the first editions produced by Thames Television of the television series This Is Your Life. After four years of modelling, Twiggy retired in 1970, stating, "You can't be a clothes hanger for your entire life!" She has stated several times that she is only really remembered for her modelling career although it was "only a short part of my life".

==== Reception ====
Twiggy and the magazines featuring her image polarised critics from the start. Her boyishly thin appearance was criticised by some for promoting an unhealthy body ideal for women. Fashion correspondent Su Dalgleish of the Daily Mail said that "Twiggy came along at a time when teen-age spending power was never greater. With that underdeveloped, boyish figure, she is an idol to the 14- and 15-year-old kids. She makes virtue of all the terrible things of gawky, miserable adolescence." The Metropolitan Museum of Art's 2009 catalogue for its exhibition The Model as Muse: Embodying Fashion noted that "Twiggy's adolescent physique was the perfect frame for the androgynous styles that began to emerge in the 1960s."

During Twiggy's March 1967 visit to New York, Women's Wear Daily characterised the intense publicity surrounding her, describing her as a "Paper Girl" manufactured by the fashion industry. At a reception in her honor, Diana Vreeland, editor-in-chief of Vogue remarked, "She has beautiful bones. She will age well," while designer Bill Blass said she represented "our infatuation with youth." Former Warhol superstar Edie Sedgwick quipped, "Twiggy copied me two years ago." Some prominent photographers also rejected Twiggy's look: Irving Penn refused to photograph her, while David Bailey, Terence Donovan, and Brian Duffy reportedly boycotted her.

In the 10 April 1967 edition of Newsweek, opinions on Twiggy remained sharply divided. Mark Cohen, president of Leeds Women's Shop in Boston, called her "the most obnoxious thing that ever came on the horizon," adding, "Her legs remind me of two painted worms." By contrast, Vreeland remained one of her strongest supporters, stating, "She's no flash in the pan. She is the mini-girl in the mini-era. She's delicious looking. I love Twiggy and intend to use her in the future." Nancy White, editor-in-chief of Harper's Bazaar, similarly endorsed her, stating, "I'm all for Twiggy. She's youth and freshness. We all need a lift and she's come along to give it to us."

In recent years, Twiggy has spoken out against the trend of waif-thin models, explaining that her own thin weight as a teenager was natural: "I was very skinny, but that was just my natural build. I always ate sensibly – being thin was in my genes."

=== 2005–present ===
Twiggy returned to modelling in 2005, fronting a major television, press, and billboard campaign for Marks & Spencer, the British department-store chain. Her involvement in the advertising campaign has been credited for Marks and Spencer's successful revival. She remains in the forefront of fashion for women of her age. She was one of the few celebrities to avoid being cut from the Marks & Spencer fashion team in 2009–2010, when Dannii Minogue joined her for the spring/summer women's wear campaign. She appeared in Marks & Spencer's 2008 Christmas ad campaign alongside Myleene Klass, Lily Cole, and others.

In the summer of 2009, the beauty products company Olay debuted its "Definity Eye Cream" campaign depicting Twiggy. Accusations of airbrushing created a stir with the media and public. A website campaign set up by Jo Swinson, the Scottish Liberal Democrat MP, attracted 700 individual complaints. Procter & Gamble admitted to minor retouching and replaced the image. The Advertising Standards Authority (ASA) announced that the ad gave a "misleading" impression, but that no further action was required because the image had already been withdrawn. Its announcement said:

However, we considered that the post-production re-touching of this ad, specifically in the eye area, could give consumers a misleading impression of the effect the product could achieve. We considered that the combination of references to "younger looking eyes", including the claim "reduces the look of wrinkles and dark circles for brighter, younger looking eyes", and post-production re-touching of Twiggy's image around the eye area, was likely to mislead.

In 2012, she worked alongside Marks & Spencer's designers to launch an exclusive clothing collection for the M&S Woman range. In 2016, archive images of Twiggy, alongside images of Shrimpton and Jane Birkin, were used for Tod's Fall/Winter campaign.

== Acting and music career ==
=== 1970–1979 ===
Twiggy began to develop a film interest through her weekly visits to Ken Russell's house; they would watch old films together, which featured Greta Garbo, Clark Gable, and other Hollywood actors and actresses. This began to give Twiggy a new outlook on the way she dressed and the way she wore her hair; she began wearing a beret, longer skirts, and flowers as the hippie look was beginning to take over London. Ken and Twiggy worked on a film together, called The Boy Friend (1971), after watching a performance of the original musical, staged by Ken's mother's amateur dramatics group.

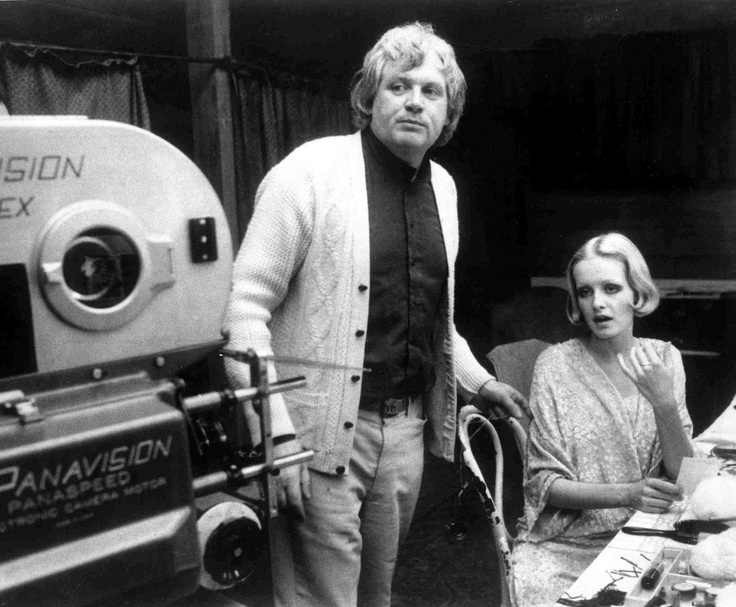
Twiggy with film director Ken Russell on set of The Boy Friend (1971)

Twiggy then embarked on an acting and singing career, starring in a variety of roles on stage and screen, and recording albums. In 1971 she made her film debut as an extra, dressed as a male courtier, in Ken Russell's The Devils. The same year, she performed her first leading role as Polly Browne in Russell's adaptation of Sandy Wilson's pastiche of 1920s hit musicals, The Boy Friend (1971). This marked her initial collaboration with Tommy Tune and won her two Golden Globe Awards in 1972 (New Star of the Year – Actress and Best Actress in a Musical or Comedy).

She broke off with Justin de Villeneuve, who had been overseeing her business affairs since 1966, and released him from his duties as her manager, claiming in later years that "her career had more to do with that famous picture of her with those funny painted eyelashes, which appeared in the Daily Express under the headline 'The Face of '66'" than with his promotional efforts.

Also in 1971, Twiggy released the single "Zoo de Zoo Zong", written by Roger Cook and Roger Greenaway and credited to Twiggy and Friends. In 1974, she made her West End stage debut in Cinderella; made a second feature, the thriller W (co-starring with her future husband Michael Witney); and hosted her own British television series Twiggs (later renamed Twiggy).

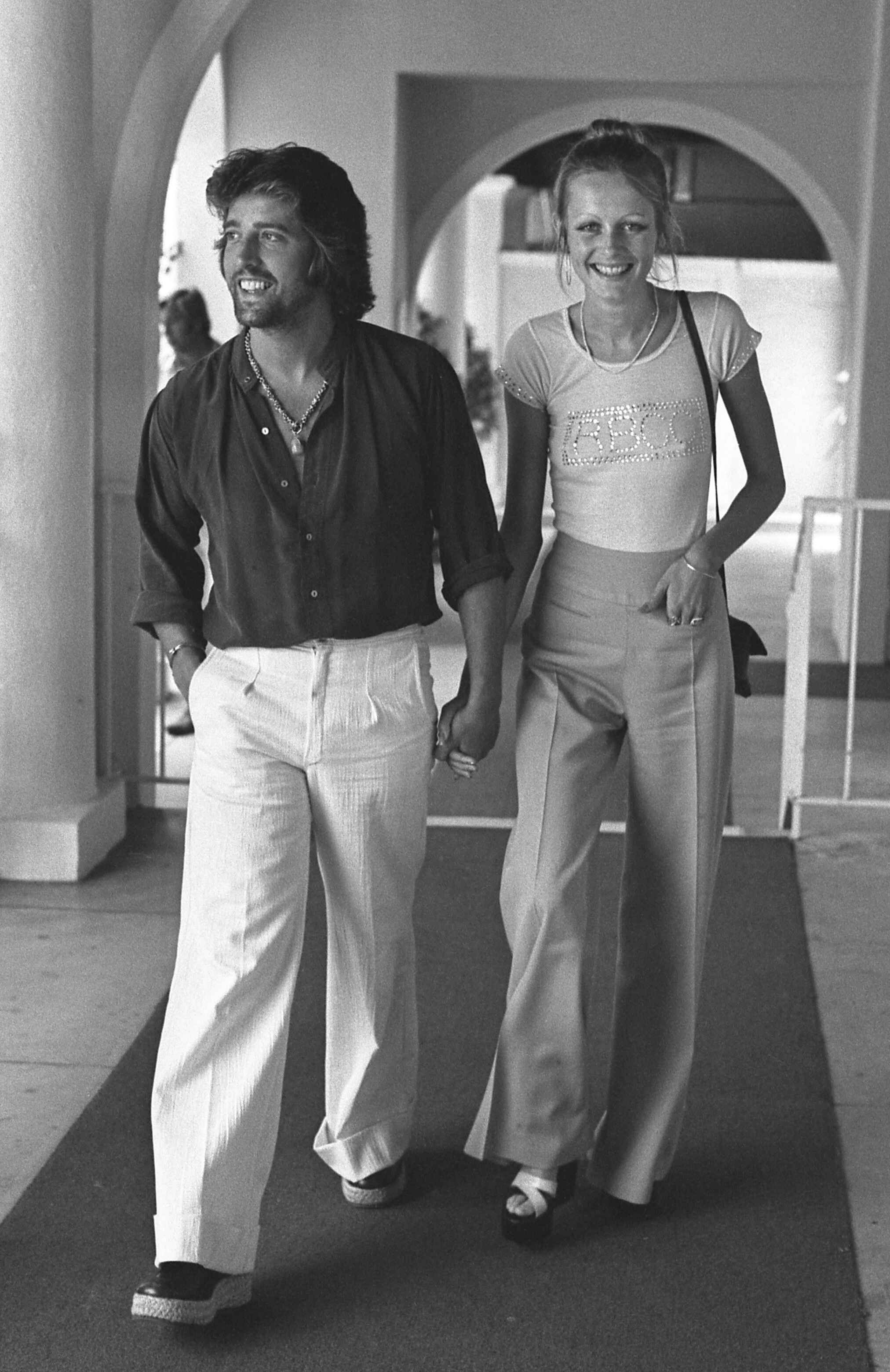
Twiggy with Justin de Villeneuve, her manager, in Los Angeles (1973)

In 1973, she appeared with David Bowie on the cover of his seventh album, Pin Ups. which entered the UK chart on 3 November 1973 and stayed there for 21 weeks, peaking at No. 1. She was also name-checked ("She'd sigh like Twig the wonder kid") in Bowie's song "Drive-In Saturday" for his Aladdin Sane album.

In October 1975, she sang at the live performance of Roger Glover's The Butterfly Ball and the Grasshopper's Feast album at the Royal Albert Hall in London. The concert was filmed and produced by Tony Klinger and released to cinemas in 1976. In November 1976, she made an appearance on The Muppet Show, in which she sang the Beatles song, "In My Life". In 1976, she signed to Mercury Records and released the albums Twiggy and Please Get My Name Right, that contained both pop and country tunes. Twiggy sold very well, peaking on the UK charts at No. 33, and gave Twiggy a silver disc for good sales. The album contains Twiggy's top-20 hit single, "Here I Go Again". "Please Get My Name Right" made it to No. 35 in 1977. The single, "A Woman in Love", failed to chart for Twiggy in 1977 but was a hit for the Three Degrees in 1979. Twiggy also sang some of the songs in the first volume of Captain Beaky and His Band in 1977.

In 1978, the television distribution arm of American International Pictures, in an effort to gain additional syndication value in the United States to the LWT rock music series Supersonic, repackaged the musical performances with Twiggy replacing Mike Mansfield's introductions. The new series, titled Twiggy's Jukebox, ran in most of the major television markets in the United States during the 1978–79 TV season. Coincidentally, Twiggy had performed "Here I Go Again" and "Vanilla Olay" on Supersonic in September 1976, and these performances were included in the refurbished programme. After the initial season, Twiggy left the series, and American International Television continued Jukebox with Britt Ekland as host, using standard music videos rather than clips from Supersonic. Twiggy appeared in "There Goes the Bride" with Tom Smothers in 1979.

=== 1980–1999 ===
In 1980, Twiggy made a cameo appearance in The Blues Brothers. She starred as Eliza Doolittle in 1981, opposite Robert Powell, in the Yorkshire TV production of Pygmalion. In 1983, she made her Broadway debut in the musical My One and Only, starring and co-staged by Tommy Tune, for which she earned a Tony nomination. She played opposite Robin Williams in the 1986 comedy Club Paradise. In 1987, she played a vaudeville performer in the British television special The Little Match Girl, and in 1988, she appeared in a supporting role in Madame Sousatzka opposite her second husband, Leigh Lawson. In 1989, she was cast as Hannah Chaplin, mother to Charles, in the British television movie Young Charlie Chaplin, aired in the United States on PBS' WonderWorks.

In 1991, she co-starred in her first American network dramatic television series, the short-lived CBS sitcom Princesses. Of eight episodes completed, only five aired. (Her Princesses co-star, Fran Drescher, later spent some time with Twiggy and her family in England while developing Drescher's hit series The Nanny, and modelled the character Maxwell Sheffield on Twiggy's husband Leigh Lawson.)

In 1993, Twiggy appeared alongside Mark Hamill in the short segment "Eye" from the made-for-cable horror anthology Body Bags. In 1994, Twiggy guest-starred in the first ever Heartbeat Christmas special (in series 4), playing Lady Janet Whitley.

In 1997, Twiggy acted in the Chichester Festival Theatre revival of Noël Coward's Blithe Spirit. A year later, she played Gertrude Lawrence in the biographical stage revue Noel and Gertie at Bay Street Theatre in Sag Harbor, Long Island. In 1999, she returned to the New York stage in an off-Broadway production, If Love Were All, a revised version of Noel and Gertie, written and directed by Leigh Lawson; what set this edition apart were its tap numbers in period style. She starred as Gertrude Lawrence opposite Harry Groener's Noël Coward.

In 1998, Twiggy teamed up with Marilyn Manson guitarist Twiggy Ramirez on a cover of Dusty Springfield's "I Only Want to Be with You" for the Dead Man on Campus soundtrack.

=== 2000–2009 ===
In 2001, Twiggy co-hosted the British magazine programme This Morning. In 2003, she released another album, Midnight Blue. Seventeen of the CD's 20 tracks had previously unreleased material from 1982 to 1990, including a duet with Leo Sayer, "Save the Last Dance for Me", and a cover of the Rolling Stones' "Ruby Tuesday". Two of the tracks ("Feel Emotion" and "Diamond") had been issued as singles in the mid-1980s.

In 2006, she portrayed herself as a 19-year-old in the radio play Elevenses with Twiggy, for BBC Radio 4's The Afternoon Play series. In 2007, Sepia Records released a previously shelved album, Heaven in My Eyes ["Discotheque"], that Twiggy recorded in 1979, produced by Donna Summer and Juergen Koppers.

In 2005, she joined the cast of the television show America's Next Top Model for Cycles 5–9 as one of four judges, and a year later, she appeared on the cover of the "Icons" issue of Swindle magazine. She did not return to America's Next Top Model in its tenth season due to scheduling conflicts. Her replacement was model Paulina Porizkova. In 2010, she started a Home Shopping Network fashion line called the "Twiggy London" collection.

On 21 November 2011, she released an album, Romantically Yours, through EMI. A collection of pop and easy listening standards spanning several generations, the album features versions of such compositions as "Bewitched, Bothered and Bewildered", "Blue Moon", "My Funny Valentine", "Someone to Watch Over Me" and "They Can't Take That Away from Me", and London anthem "Waterloo Sunset". The album also includes a guest vocal appearance by Twiggy's daughter, Carly Lawson, on Neil Young's "Only Love Can Break Your Heart", a guitar solo by Bryan Adams, and a version of Richard Marx's "Right Here Waiting" featuring duet vocals with the American songwriter himself.

On 22 November 2022, actress and filmmaker Sadie Frost teamed up with Twiggy to create an interactive virtual documentary about Twiggy's life. On 16 May 2023, the documentary's final scene was produced live at Cannes Marché du Film Festival (the Cannes Film Festival) 2023, in just 48 hours, using the on-site virtual production stage of film studio, Film Soho. Alongside this, a live virtual experience by metaverse company, Hadean, and live event visualisation solutions provider, disguise, made use of Unreal Engine to create a photo-realistic recreation of London's Carnaby Street in the 1960s, engaging users with interactive elements based on Twiggy's memories of the time.

Sadie Frost's documentary about Twiggy's life was released in UK and Ireland cinemas on 7 March 2025.

A jukebox musical based on Twiggy's life titled Twiggy The Musical was written and directed by Ben Elton and had its world premiere at the Menier Chocolate Factory, London in September 2023 (originally as Close-Up: The Twiggy Musical). It will tour the UK from September 2025.

== Honours ==
She was appointed a Dame Commander of the Order of the British Empire (DBE) in the 2019 New Year Honours for services to fashion, to the arts and to charity. Her appointment appeared in The London Gazette under her married name, Lesley Lawson.

== Personal life ==
Twiggy married American actor Michael Witney in 1977. Their daughter Carly was born in 1978. They remained married until his death in 1983 from a heart attack. She met Leigh Lawson in 1984. In 1988, they worked on the film Madame Sousatzka and married that year in Sag Harbor, New York. In 2014, the couple were living in Kensington, London. They have also owned a home in Southwold, Suffolk.

On Twiggy's official website, she states she is a supporter of breast cancer research, animal welfare, and anti-fur campaigns. She was one of the celebrities, including Tom Hiddleston, Jo Brand, E. L. James, Benedict Cumberbatch, and Rachel Riley, to design and sign her own card for the UK-based charity Thomas Coram Foundation for Children. The campaign was launched by crafting company Stampin' Up! UK, and the cards were auctioned off on eBay during May 2014.

== Filmography ==
=== Film ===
Year	Title	Role	Notes
1971	The Devils	Woman	Uncredited
1971	The Boy Friend	Polly	
1974	W	Katie Lewis	
1980	The Blues Brothers	Chic Lady	
1980	There Goes the Bride	Polly Perkins	
1985	The Doctor and the Devils	Jennie Bailey	
1986	Club Paradise	Phillipa Lloyd	
1986	The Little Match Girl	Josie Roberts	TV movie
1988	Madame Sousatzka	Jenny	
1988	The Diamond Trap	Det. Sgt. Charlie Lawson	TV movie
1988	Sun Child	Fen Harris	TV movie
1990	Istanbul (Keep Your Eyes Open)	Maud	
1993	Body Bags	Cathy Matthews	
1997	Something Borrowed, Something Blue	Eve Hamel	TV movie
1998	Brand New World	Viv	TV movie

=== Television ===
- Twiggs (1974)
- Twiggy (1975)
- The Muppet Show (1976) (episode 21)
- Victorian Scandals (1976)
- Bing Crosby's Merrie Olde Christmas (1977)
- The Hanna-Barbera Happy Hour (1978)
- Twiggy's Jukebox (1978–1979)
- The Donna Summer Special (1980)
- A Gift of Music (1981)
- Pygmalion, Eliza Doolittle. Celebrity Playhouse, Yorkshire Television (December 1981)
- Young Charlie Chaplin (1989)
- Princesses (1991)
- Tales from the Crypt (1992) (1 episode)
- The Nanny (1994) (1 episode)
- Heartbeat (1994) (1 episode)
- Absolutely Fabulous (2000–2001)
- This Morning (presenter) (2001)
- Take Time With Twiggy (host) (2001)
- America's Next Top Model (judge, cycles 5–9) (2005–2007)
- ShakespeaRe-Told: The Taming of the Shrew (2005)
- Friday Night with Jonathan Ross (guest) (2008)
- Twiggy's Frock Exchange (2008)
- Alan Titchmarsh's Walks of Fame (2010)
- Who Do You Think You Are? (episode 100) (2014)
- The People's History Of Pop (host, 1 episode) (2016)
- RuPaul's Drag Race UK (judge, 1 episode) (2019)

== Stage ==
- Cinderella, Casino Theatre, London, (1974)
- The Butterfly Ball and the Grasshopper's Feast, the Royal Albert Hall, London (1975)
- Captain Beaky and His Musical Christmas (pantomime), Apollo Victoria Theatre, London (1981)
- My One and Only, St. James Theatre, New York (1983–1984)
- Blithe Spirit, Chichester Festival Theatre, (1997)
- Noel and Gertie, Bay Street Theatre, Long Island, New York, (1998)
- If Love Were All, Lucille Lortel Theatre, New York City (1999)
- Blithe Spirit, Bay Street Theatre, Long Island, New York (2002)
- Mrs. Warren's Profession, on tour, England (2003)

== Discography ==
Albums

- The Boyfriend (Original Soundtrack) (1971)
- Twiggy and the Girlfriends (1972)
- Twiggy (1976)
- Please Get My Name Right (1977)
- Captain Beaky and His Band (1977)
- My One and Only (with Tommy Tune) (1983)
- Midnight Blue (2003)
- Heaven In My Eyes – Discotheque (2007)
- Gotta Sing Gotta Dance (2009)
- Romantically Yours (2011)

Singles

- 1966: "Some Do Some Don't (Some Will Some Won't)" (with Anne) (Columbia)
- 1967: "Beautiful Dreams" (Ember Records)
- 1967: "When I Think of You" (Ember Records)
- 1971: "Zoo De Zoo Zong" (with Friends) (Bell Records)
- 1972: "A Room in Bloomsbury" (with Christopher Gable) (Columbia)
- 1976: "Here I Go Again" (Mercury Records) (UK #17)
- 1976: "Vanilla Olay" (Mercury Records)
- 1977: "Rings" ((UK #35) from her album Please Get My Name Right)
- 1977: "Please Get My Name Right" (Mercury Records)
- 1977: "I Hope We Get to Love in Time" (Mercury Records)
- 1977: "A Woman in Love" (Mercury Records)
- 1977: "Tomorrow is Another Day" (Mercury Records)
- 1978: "Falling Angel" (Mercury Records)
- 1985: "Feel Emotion" (Arista Records) (UK #81)
- 1986: "Diamond" (Arista Records)
- 1989: "Winter Wonderland" (Object)

== Books and exhibits ==
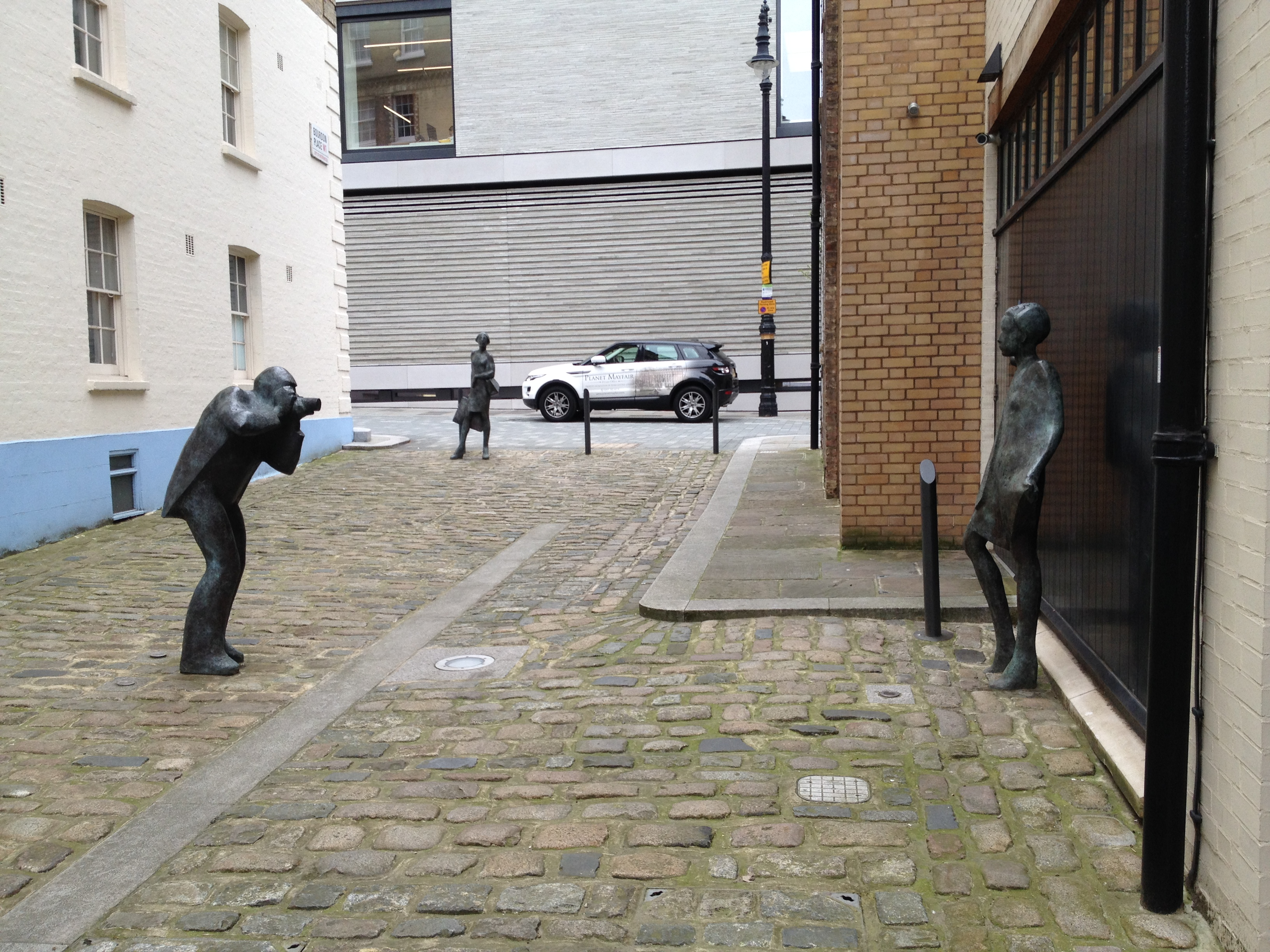
Sculpture (2012) by Neal French. Three Figures, Bourdon Place, London W1. A passing shopper stumbles upon Terence Donovan photographing the model Twiggy near to his studio in 1960s Mayfair.

- Twiggy, Twiggy: An Autobiography (1975), ISBN 978-0-246-10895-1
- Twiggy, Twiggy's Guide to Looking Good (1986), ISBN 978-0-00-636672-0
- Twiggy, Twiggy in Black and White (1997), ISBN 978-0-671-51645-1
- Emma Midgley, "London Swings Again With Ossie Clark Show At The V&A" (22 July 2003), Culture24
- Twiggy, Twiggy: Please Get My Name Right (2004), Word Power Books, ISBN 9784939102578
- Iain R Webb, Bill Gibb: Fashion and Fantasy (2008), foreword by Twiggy, ISBN 978-1-85177-548-4
- Twiggy, A Guide to Looking and Feeling Fabulous Over Forty (2008), ISBN 978-0-7181-5404-2
- The Model as Muse: Embodying Fashion, Metropolitan Museum of Art, May–August 2009
- Twiggy: A Life in Photographs, Terence Pepper, Robin Muir, and Melvin Sokolsky (2009), ISBN 978-1-85514-414-9
- Twiggy: A Life in Photographs, National Portrait Gallery (2009–2010)

Preceded by Richard and Judy	Host of This Morning with Coleen Nolan; 2001	Succeeded by John Leslie and Fern Britton
