= List of Decca albums =

This is a list of albums produced by Decca Records.

== 78 rpm ==
Album No.	Title	Artist(s)	Year	Source
1	Moussorgsky Songs	Vladimir Rosing	1938	
10	Music of Hawaii	Bing Crosby, Ted Fio Rito, Harry Owens, Ray Kinney	1939	
15	Decca Presents a Collection of Stephen Foster Melodies	Frank Luther and Lyn Murray Quartet	1939	
17	Decca Presents Vicente Gomez in a Guitar Recital	Vicente Gomez	1938	
19	Decca Offers a Collection of Old Time Dance Music	Freddie "Schnickerfritz" Fisher and His Orchestra	1939 ?	
22	Sousa Marches	American Legion Band of Hollywood California	1939	
38	Victor Herbert Melodies, Vol. 1	Bing Crosby, Frances Langford, Rudy Vallée, Florence George	1939	
47	Songs of Old New York	Frank Luther, Zora Layman, The Century Quartet	1939	
49	Songs of Old California	Frank Luther, Zora Layman, The Century Quartet	1939	
50	Patriotic Songs for Children	Bing Crosby, Frank Luther	1939	
69	Cowboy Songs	Bing Crosby	1939	
72	Victor Herbert Melodies, Vol. 2	Bing Crosby, Frances Langford, Rudy Vallée, Florence George	1939	
76	Judy Garland - Souvenir Album	Judy Garland	March 1940	
96	George Gershwin Songs, Vol. 1	Bing Crosby, Jacques Fray, Anne Jamieson, The Merry Macs, Shirley Ross	1940	
97	George Gershwin Songs, Vol. 2	Judy Garland, Connie Boswell and others	1940	
134	Ballad for Americans	Bing Crosby	1940	
137	Boogie Woogie Music	Bob Crosby, Woody Herman, Teddy Powell, Andy Kirk, Honey Hill, Mary Lou Williams, Albert Ammons, Pete Johnson	1940?	
140	Favorite Hawaiian Songs	Bing Crosby	1940	
159	Christmas Music	Bing Crosby, Kenny Baker, Men About Town, Eddie Dunstedter	1940	
181	Star Dust	Bing Crosby	1940	
193	Hawaii Calls	Bing Crosby, Frances Langford, Dick McIntire, Harry Owens	1941	
194	Hilo Hattie	Hilo Hattie	1941	
200	Gems of Jazz, Vol. 1	Mildred Bailey and others	1941	
202	Small Fry	Bing Crosby, Johnny Mercer, Connee Boswell	1941	
207	The Quintet of the Hot Club of France	Quintet featuring Diango Reinhardt, Stephane Grappelly	1941	
211	Kansas City Jazz	Count Basie, and others	1941	
212	Swinging the Classics	Hazel Scott	1941	
221	Decca Presents Crosbyana	Bing Crosby	1941	
250	Under Western Skies	Bing Crosby	1941	
251	School Days	Moylan Sisters	1941	
A-306	Song Hits from Holiday Inn	Bing Crosby, Fred Astaire	1942	
A-347	Christmas Candle	Judy Garland, Tony Martin, and others	November 1942	
A-349	Second Souvenir Album	Judy Garland, Gene Kelly	May 20, 1943	
A-371	Favorite Hawaiian Songs	Dorothy Lamour	1944	
A-380	Meet Me in St. Louis	Judy Garland	1944	
A-388	Selections from The Harvey Girls	Judy Garland, Kenny Baker, Virginia O'Brien	1945	
A-403	Merry Christmas	Bing Crosby, The Andrews Sisters	1945	
A-405	Selections from Going My Way	Bing Crosby	1945	
A-410	Selections from The Bells of St. Mary's	Bing Crosby	1945	
A-417	Don't Fence Me In	Bing Crosby, The Andrews Sisters	1946	
A-420	The Happy Prince	Bing Crosby, Orson Welles	1946	
A-423	Selections from Road to Utopia	Bing Crosby	1946	
A-432	Rip Van Winkle	Walter Huston	1946	
A-440	Bing Crosby - Stephen Foster	Bing Crosby	1946	
A-453	What We So Proudly Hail	Bing Crosby	1946	
A-460	Favorite Hawaiian Songs, Vol. One	Bing Crosby	1946	
A-461	Favorite Hawaiian Songs, Vol. Two	Bing Crosby	1946	
A-469	In Songs He Made Famous	Al Jolson	1946	
A-480	'Twas the Night Before Christmas	Fred Waring	1946	
A-481	Blue Skies	Bing Crosby, Fred Astaire, Trudy Erwin	1946	
A-482	Bing Crosby - Stephen Foster	Bing Crosby	1946	
A-485	Bing Crosby - Jerome Kern	Bing Crosby	1946	
A-495	St. Patrick's Day	Bing Crosby	1947	
A-499	Cole Porter Songs	Fred Waring	1947	
A-505	Bing Crosby – Victor Herbert	Bing Crosby, Frances Langford	1947	
A-512	Guy Lombardo	Guy Lombardo	1947	
A-514	Cowboy Songs, Vol. One	Bing Crosby	1947	
A-526	Polka	Lawrence Welk	1947	
A-531	Selections from Welcome Stranger	Bing Crosby	1947	
A-536	Our Common Heritage	Bing Crosby, Brian Donlevy, Walter Huston, Fredric March, Agnes Moorehead, Pat O'Brien	1947	
A-541	Souvenir	Hildegarde	1947	
A-547	El Bingo - Latin American Favorites	Bing Crosby	1947	
A-550	Merry Christmas	Bing Crosby, The Andrews Sisters	1947	
A-551	A Collection of Tropical Songs	The Andrews Sisters	1947	
A-553	The Small One	Bing Crosby	1947	
DAU3	The Man Without a Country	Bing Crosby	1947	
A-559	Don't Fence Me In	Bing Crosby	1947	
A-575	Al Jolson - Souvenir Album	Al Jolson	1947	
A-578	Drifting and Dreaming	Bing Crosby	1948	
A-580	Program Time	Fred Waring and his Pennsylvanians	1948	
A-602	Dancing in the Dark	Carmen Cavallaro	1948	
A-603	Boogie Woogie Album	Woody Herman, Bob Crosby	1948	
A-615	Blue of the Night	Bing Crosby	1948	
A-619	Selections from Showboat	Bing Crosby, Frances Langford, Tony Martin, Kenny Baker, Lee Wiley	1948	
A-620	Bing Crosby – The Emperor Waltz	Bing Crosby	1948	
A-621	St. Valentine's Day (Bing Crosby album)	Bing Crosby	1948	
A-628	Bing Crosby Sings with Al Jolson, Bob Hope, Dick Haymes and the Andrews Sisters	Bing Crosby, Al Jolson, Bob Hope, Dick Haymes and the Andrews Sisters.	1948	
A-629	Selections from Road to Rio	Bing Crosby, The Andrews Sisters, Nan Wynn Bing Crosby Sings with Al Jolson, Bob Hope, Dick Haymes and the Andrews Sisters	1948	
A-631	Bing Crosby Sings with Judy Garland, Mary Martin, Johnny Mercer	Bing Crosby, Judy Garland, Mary Martin, Johnny Mercer	1948	
A-634	Bing Crosby Sings with Lionel Hampton, Eddie Heywood, Louis Jordan	Bing Crosby, Lionel Hampton, Eddie Heywood, Louis Jordan	1948	
A-648	Bing Crosby Sings the Song Hits from Broadway Shows	Bing Crosby, Trudy Erwin	1948	
A-649	Al Jolson - Vol. 3	Al Jolson Bing Crosby Sings the Song Hits from Broadway Shows	1948	
A-658	Cowboy Songs, Vol. Two	Bing Crosby	1948	
A-663	Auld Lang Syne	Bing Crosby	1948	
A-678	Star Dust	Bing Crosby	1949	
A-691	Bing Crosby Sings Cole Porter Songs	Bing Crosby	1949	
A-699	A Connecticut Yankee In King Arthur's Court	Bing Crosby, Rhonda Fleming, Cedric Hardwicke, William Bendix	1949	
A-702	Bing Crosby Sings Songs by George Gershwin	Bing Crosby	1949	
A-714	South Pacific (Decca album)	Bing Crosby, Danny Kaye, Ella Fitzgerald, Evelyn Knight	1949	
A-715	Christmas Greetings	Bing Crosby, The Andrews Sisters	1949	
A-716	Jolson Sings Again	Al Jolson	1949	
DAU-725	Ichabod - The Legend of Sleepy Hollow (Decca album)	Bing Crosby	1949	
A-762	Guy Lombardo - Silver Jubilee	Guy Lombardo	1949	
A-783	College Marching Songs	Russ Morgan	1949	
A-790	Songs from Mr. Music	Bing Crosby, The Andrews Sisters, Dorothy Kirsten	1950	
A-805	Bing Crosby Sings the Song Hits from...	Bing Crosby, Patty Andrews	1951	
A-822	Stephen Foster Songs	Al Jolson	1950	
A-826	Bing Crosby – Way Back Home	Bing Crosby	1951	
A-831	Al Jolson - Souvenir Album Vol. 6	Al Jolson	1951	
A-852	Bing and the Dixieland Bands	Bing Crosby	1951	
A-956	Selections from Irving Berlin's White Christmas	Bing Crosby, Danny Kaye, Peggy Lee, Trudy Stevens	1954	

== 10" vinyl LPs ==
Album No.	Title	Artist(s)	Year	Source
DL 5000	Bing Crosby Sings the Song Hits from Broadway Shows	Bing Crosby, Trudy Erwin	1949	
DL 5001	Bing Crosby - Jerome Kern	Bing Crosby	1949	
DL 5010	Bing Crosby Sings Stephen Foster Songs	Bing Crosby	1949	
DL 5011	El Bingo – A Collection of Latin American Favorites	Bing Crosby	1949	
DL 5019	Merry Christmas (Bing Crosby album)	Bing Crosby, The Andrews Sisters	1949	
DL 5020	Christmas Greetings	Bing Crosby, The Andrews Sisters	1949	
DL 5028	Auld Lang Syne	Bing Crosby	1949	
DL 5037	St. Patrick's Day (Bing Crosby album)	Bing Crosby	1949	
DL 5039	St. Valentine's Day (Bing Crosby album)	Bing Crosby	1949	
DL 5042	Blue Skies	Bing Crosby	1949	
DL 5052	Going My Way/The Bells of St. Mary's	Bing Crosby	1949	
DL 5060	Selections from Showboat	Bing Crosby, Frances Langford, Kenny Baker, Lee Wiley	1949	
DL 5063	Don't Fence Me In	Bing Crosby, The Andrews Sisters	1949	
DL 5064	Bing Crosby Sings Cole Porter Songs	Bing Crosby	1949	
DL 5081	Bing Crosby Sings Songs by George Gershwin	Bing Crosby	1949	
DL 5092	Song Hits from Holiday Inn	Bing Crosby, Fred Astaire	1949	
DL 5105	Blue of the Night	Bing Crosby	1949	
DL 5107	Cowboy Songs, Volume 1	Bing Crosby	1950	
DL 5119	Drifting and Dreaming	Bing Crosby	1950	
DL 5122	Favorite Hawaiian Songs, Vol. One	Bing Crosby	1950	
DL 5126	Stardust	Bing Crosby	1950	
DL 5129	Cowboy Songs, Vol. Two	Bing Crosby	1951	
DL 5207	South Pacific	Bing Crosby, Danny Kaye, Ella Fitzgerald, Evelyn Knight	1951	
DL 5272	Top o' the Morning / Emperor Waltz	Bing Crosby, Ann Blyth	1950	
DL 5284	Songs from Mr. Music	Bing Crosby, The Andrews Sisters, Dorothy Kirsten	1950	
DL 5298	Bing Crosby Sings the Song Hits from...	Bing Crosby, Patty Andrews	1951	
DL 5299	Favorite Hawaiian Songs, Vol. Two	Bing Crosby	1951	
DL 5302	Go West Young Man (Bing Crosby album)	Bing Crosby, The Andrews Sisters	1951	
DL 5310	Bing Crosby – Way Back Home	Bing Crosby	1951	
DL 5316	Al Jolson and Bing Crosby	Bing Crosby, Al Jolson	1951	
DL 5323	Bing and the Dixieland Bands	Bing Crosby	1951	
DL 5326	Yours Is My Heart Alone	Bing Crosby	1951	
DL 5331	Country Style	Bing Crosby, The Andrews Sisters	1951	
DL 5340	Down Memory Lane - Vol. 1	Bing Crosby	1951	
DL 5340	Down Memory Lane - Vol. 2	Bing Crosby	1951	
DL 5351	Beloved Hymns	Bing Crosby	1951	
DL 5355	Bing Crosby – Victor Herbert	Bing Crosby, Frances Langford	1951	
DL 5390	Bing and Connee	Bing Crosby, Connee Boswell	1952	
DL 5403	When Irish Eyes Are Smiling	Bing Crosby	1952	
DL 5411	The Quiet Man	Bing Crosby	1952	
DL 5417	Just for You	Bing Crosby, The Andrews Sisters, Jane Wyman	1952	
DL 5444	Road to Bali (album)	Bing Crosby, Bob Hope, Peggy Lee	1952	
DL 5499	Le Bing: Song Hits of Paris	Bing Crosby	1953	
DL 5508	Some Fine Old Chestnuts	Bing Crosby	1953	
DL 5520	Bing Sings the Hits	Bing Crosby	1954	
DL 5556	The Country Girl / Little Boy Lost	Bing Crosby	1955	
DL 6000	The Happy Prince / The Small One	Bing Crosby, Orson Welles	1949	
DL 6001	Ichabod - The Legend Of Sleepy Hollow / Rip Van Winkle	Bing Crosby, Walter Huston	1949	
DL 6008	Bing Crosby, Collectors' Classics - Vol. 1	Bing Crosby	1950	
DL 6009	Bing Crosby, Collectors' Classics - Vol. 2	Bing Crosby	1950	
DL 6010	Bing Crosby, Collectors' Classics - Vol. 3	Bing Crosby	1950	
DL 6011	Bing Crosby, Collectors' Classics - Vol. 4	Bing Crosby	1950	
DL 6012	Bing Crosby, Collectors' Classics - Vol. 5	Bing Crosby	1950	
DL 6013	Bing Crosby, Collectors' Classics - Vol. 6	Bing Crosby	1950	
DL 6014	Bing Crosby, Collectors' Classics - Vol. 7	Bing Crosby	1950	
DL 6015	Bing Crosby, Collectors' Classics - Vol. 8	Bing Crosby	1950	

== 12" vinyl LPs ==
Album No.	Title	Artist(s)	Year	Source
DL 4450	Marching Along Together	The Goldman Band	1963	
DL 4453	Golden March Favorites	The Goldman Band	1960	
DL 5546	On Parade!	The Goldman Band	1955	
DL 8185	Here Comes the Band	The Goldman Band	unknown	
DL 8445	I Love to Hear a Band	The Goldman Band	1957	
DL 8489	Horn of Plenty	James F. Burke	1957	
DL 8633	Band Masterpieces	The Goldman Band	1958	
DL 8807	Sousa Marches in Hi Fi	The Goldman Band	1960	
DL 8931	The Sound of the Goldman Band	The Goldman Band	1960	
