= The Emperor Waltz (disambiguation) =

The Emperor Waltz or Emperor Waltz may refer to:

- Kaiser-Walzer, Op. 437 (also known as Emperor Waltz), a waltz composed by Johann Strauss II in 1889
- The Emperor Waltz, 1948 American musical film directed by Billy Wilder and starring Bing Crosby and Joan Fontaine
- The Emperor Waltz (1953 film), Austrian drama
- The Emperor's Waltz (1933 film), German film directed by Frederic Zelnik
- The Emperor Waltz (album), 1948 Bing Crosby album of 78 rpm singles from the film
- Top o' the Morning / Emperor Waltz, 1950 Bing Crosby LP album by combining the 1948 recordings with others from the 1949 film Top o' the Morning
