= What We So Proudly Hail =

What So Proudly We Hail
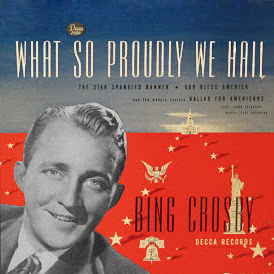

Compilation album by Bing Crosby
- Released: Original 78 rpm album: 1946; Original LP album: 1950
- Recorded: 1939, 1940
- Genre: Popular, patriotic
- Length: 16:10
- Label: Decca

Bing Crosby chronology
Bing Crosby – Stephen Foster (1946)	What So Proudly We Hail (1946)	Favorite Hawaiian Songs, Vol. One (1946)

What So Proudly We Hail is a compilation album of phonograph records by Bing Crosby released in 1946 featuring songs that were sung by Crosby in an American-type patriotic style. This album featured Bing singing patriotic songs such as: "Ballad for Americans", "God Bless America" and "The Star-Spangled Banner". The songs were later presented in a 33 1/3 rpm split set with The Man Without a Country.

== Background to "Ballad for Americans" recording ==
Crosby did not approach the project lightly. He studied the work before the session, and his concentration in the studio was intense. Usually, Crosby would record up to five tunes in two hours or so, rarely taking more than two takes, but with "Ballad for Americans", he devoted an hour to each of the four segments. New York Post critic Michael Levin wrote:

This is the finest recorded performance Bing had done to date and shows that in the last few years he has gone beyond binging and has really learned how to sing.

Levin made a comparison with Paul Robeson’s Victor set that would have pleased Decca chief Jack Kapp’s team:

For all of Robeson’s magnificent voice, we prefer the Crosby version. The recording is better, the orchestration is better, and the chorus is better trained.

== Track listing ==
These previously issued songs were featured on a 3-disc, 78 rpm album set, Decca Album No. DA-453.

Side / Title	Writer(s)	Recording date	Performed with	Time
Disc 1 (23579):
A. "The Star-Spangled Banner"	Francis Scott Key, John Stafford Smith	March 22, 1939	John Scott Trotter and His Orchestra and Max Terr's Mixed Chorus	2:46
B. "God Bless America"	Irving Berlin	March 22, 1939	John Scott Trotter and His Orchestra and Max Terr's Mixed Chorus	3:12
Disc 2 (23580):
A. "Ballad for Americans – Part One"	John La Touche, Earl Robinson	July 6, 1940	The Ken Darby Singers and Victor Young's Decca Concert Orchestra	2:26
B. "Ballad for Americans – Part Four"	John La Touche, Earl Robinson	July 6, 1940	The Ken Darby Singers and Victor Young's Decca Concert Orchestra	2:16
Disc 3 (23581):
A. "Ballad for Americans – Part Two"	John La Touche, Earl Robinson	July 6, 1940	The Ken Darby Singers and Victor Young's Decca Concert Orchestra	2:24
B. "Ballad for Americans – Part Three"	John La Touche, Earl Robinson	July 6, 1940	The Ken Darby Singers and Victor Young's Decca Concert Orchestra	3:06

== Other releases ==
The album with all of the same selections was transferred to a Dual 10" LP along with The Man Without a Country 78 rpm set in 1950 with the catalogue number DL 8020.
