= Victor Herbert (album) =

Compilation album by Bing Crosby
- Released: Original 78 album: 1947; Original LP album: 1951
- Recorded: 1946
- Genre: Popular
- Length: 24:23
- Label: Decca

Bing Crosby chronology
St. Patrick's Day (1947)	Victor Herbert (1947)	Cowboy Songs, Vol. One (1947)

Victor Herbert is a compilation album of phonograph records by Bing Crosby and Frances Langford of songs written by Victor Herbert.

== Track listing ==
These songs were featured on a 3-disc, 78 rpm album set, Decca Album No. A-505.

Disc 1 (23814):
A. "I'm Falling in Love with Someone"
B. "Gypsy Love Song"
Disc 2 (23815):
A. "Ah! Sweet Mystery of Life"
B. "Sweethearts"
Disc 3 (23816):
A. "When You're Away"
B. "Thine Alone"

== LP track listing ==
Decca released a 45 rpm set of 7-inch vinyl titled Bing Crosby Sings Victor Herbert Songs Decca 9-111 in 1951 containing the same songs with the addition of "I Might Be Your Once-in-a-While" and "Indian Summer" and a 10-inch vinyl LP Bing Crosby Sings Victor Herbert Songs Decca DL 5355 with the same track listing. Recording dates follow song titles.

All music is composed by Victor Herbert. Recording dates follow song titles.

Side one
No.	Title	Lyrics	Performed with	Length
1.	"I'm Falling in Love with Someone" (December 9, 1938)	Rida Johnson Young	Frances Langford and Victor Young and His Orchestra	3:08
2.	"Gypsy Love Song" (December 9, 1938)	Harry B. Smith	Frances Langford and Victor Young and His Orchestra	3:02
3.	"Ah! Sweet Mystery of Life" (December 2, 1938)	Rida Johnson Young	Victor Young and His Orchestra	2:53
4.	"Sweethearts" (December 2, 1938)	Robert Bache Smith	Victor Young and His Orchestra	3:16

Side two
No.	Title	Lyrics	Performed with	Length
1.	"When You're Away" (December 2, 1938)	Henry Blossom	Victor Young and His Orchestra	3:05
2.	"Thine Alone" (December 2, 1938)	Henry Blossom	Victor Young and His Orchestra	2:55
3.	"I Might Be Your Once-in-a-While" (February 7, 1951)	Robert Bache Smith	John Scott Trotter and His Orchestra	3:02
4.	"Indian Summer" (February 7, 1951)	Al Dubin	John Scott Trotter and His Orchestra	3:02
