= Martland =

Martland is a surname. Notable people with the surname include:

- Clive Martland (born 1968), British Royal Air Force officer
- Harrison Stanford Martland (1883–1954), American pathologist
- Peter Martland (born 1947), historian
- Ronald Martland (1907–1997), Canadian judge
- Steve Martland (1959–2013), English classical composer
- Christopher Martland (1989), Swedish pop artist
