= Stephen Foster (album) =

1946 compilation album by Bing Crosby

Compilation album by Bing Crosby
- Released: Original 78 album: 1946; Re-release 78 album: 1946; Original LP album: 1949
- Recorded: 1935; 1940; 1941
- Genre: Popular
- Length: 23:36
- Label: Decca

Bing Crosby chronology
Selections from Road to Utopia (1946)	Stephen Foster (1946)	What We So Proudly Hail (1946)

Stephen Foster is a compilation album of phonograph records by Bing Crosby of songs by Stephen Foster released in 1946.

== Background ==
Bing Crosby had enjoyed unprecedented success during the 1940s with his discography showing six No. 1 hits in 1944 alone. His films such as Going My Way and The Bells of St. Mary's were huge successes as were the Road films he made with Bob Hope. On radio, his Kraft Music Hall and Philco Radio Time shows were very popular. Decca Records built on this by issuing a number of 78rpm album sets, some featuring freshly recorded material and others utilizing Crosby's back catalogue. Ten of these sets were released in 1946, nine in 1947 and nine more in 1948. Most of these 78 rpm albums were reissued as 10-inch vinyl LP's in subsequent years.

== Reception ==
Billboard liked the album saying: "It was expected that sooner or later Bing Crosby would make an album of Stephen Foster tunes. Crosby does full justice to the popular composer's music."

== Original track listing ==
The songs were featured on a 4-disc, 78 rpm album set, Decca Album No. A-440.

Disc 1 (18801): "Jeanie with the Light Brown Hair" / "Nell and I"
Disc 2 (18802): "Beautiful Dreamer" / "Sweetly She Sleeps, My Alice Fair"
Disc 3 (18803): "My Old Kentucky Home" / "De Camptown Races"
Disc 4 (18804): "Old Folks at Home" / "Old Black Joe"

== Re-issue track listing ==
The same songs were issued on another 4-disc, 78 rpm album set, Decca Album No. A-482 later in 1946, although the actual discs had different numbers.

Disc 1 (25127): "Jeanie with the Light Brown Hair" / "Nell and I"
Disc 2 (25128): "Beautiful Dreamer" / "Sweetly She Sleeps, My Alice Fair"
Disc 3 (25129): "My Old Kentucky Home" / "De Camptown Races"
Disc 4 (25130): "Old Folks at Home" / "Old Black Joe"

== LP track listing ==
The same songs were issued on a Decca 10-inch album DL 5010 in 1949.

All tracks are written by Stephen Foster. Recording dates follow song titles.

Side one
No.	Title	Performed with	Length
1.	"Jeanie with the Light Brown Hair" (March 22, 1940)	John Scott Trotter and His Orchestra	2:46
2.	"Nell and I" (July 5, 1941)	John Scott Trotter and His Orchestra	2:51
3.	"Beautiful Dreamer" (March 22, 1940)	John Scott Trotter and His Orchestra	2:51
4.	"Sweetly She Sleeps, My Alice Fair" (June 16, 1941)	John Scott Trotter and His Orchestra	3:13

Side two
No.	Title	Performed with	Length
1.	"My Old Kentucky Home" (December 9, 1940)	Victor Young and His Orchestra	3:10
2.	"De Camptown Races" (December 9, 1940)	Victor Young and His Orchestra	2:42
3.	"Old Folks at Home" (February 21, 1935)	Georgie Stoll and His Orchestra	3:05
4.	"Old Black Joe" (June 16, 1941)	John Scott Trotter and His Orchestra	2:58
