= Patriotic Songs for Children =

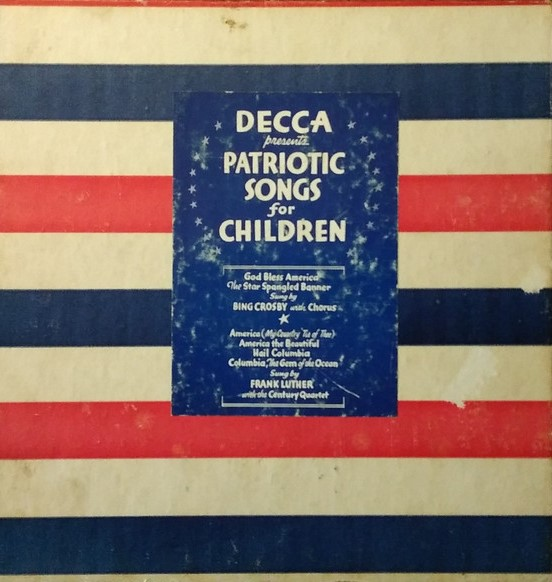

Compilation album by Bing Crosby, Frank Luther
- Released: Original 78 album: 1939
- Recorded: 1939
- Genre: Popular
- Label: Decca

Bing Crosby chronology
Victor Herbert Melodies, Vol. One (1939)	Patriotic Songs for Children (1939)	Cowboy; Songs (1939)

Patriotic Songs for Children is a compilation album of three 78 rpm phonograph records. The recordings are all of American patriotic songs sung by Bing Crosby and Frank Luther.

== Background ==
Historically, the term "album" was applied to a collection of various items housed in a book format. In musical usage the word was used for collections of short pieces of printed music from the early 19th century. Later, collections of related 78 rpm records were bundled in book-like albums (one side of a 78 rpm record could hold only about 3.5 minutes of sound). The only way an “album” could be put together was to sell three or four 78s in a bound set of sheathes. These sets, known as folios were increasingly popular. Whilst they had originally been neutral – blank albums into which the distributor could insert whatever 78s he liked – the idea of using a theme to link the records in the folio was catching on. By the late 1930s, this trend had developed to the point where artists were going into studios to record six or eight titles with a folio set in mind. This in effect was the birth of the concept album, although it would not be until LPs became commonplace that the phrase gained any currency.

The first album issued by Decca, probably in 1938, was Moussorgsky Songs by Vladimir Rosing, on catalogue number A-1. (List of Decca albums). Patriotic Songs for Children was one of the first concept albums of 78 rpm recordings issued by Decca Records.

== Track listing ==
These previously issued songs were featured on a 3-disc, 78 rpm album set, Decca Album No. A-50.

Disc 1: (2400)

1. "God Bless America", recorded on March 22, 1939 by Bing Crosby with Max Terr's Mixed Chorus.
2. "The Star-Spangled Banner", recorded on March 22, 1939 by Bing Crosby with Max Terr's Mixed Chorus.

Disc 2: (2476)

3. "America", recorded on May 1, 1939 by Frank Luther and Century Quartet.
4. "America the Beautiful”, recorded on May 1, 1939 by Frank Luther and Century Quartet.

Disc 3: (2477)

5. "Hail, Columbia", recorded on May 1, 1939 by Frank Luther and Century Quartet.
6. "Columbia, the Gem of the Ocean“ recorded on May 1, 1939 by Frank Luther and Century Quartet.
