= Jerome Kern (album) =

1946 compilation album by Bing Crosby

Compilation album by Bing Crosby
- Released: 1946 (original 78 rpm album); 1949 (10-inch LP album)
- Recorded: 1936, 1944, 1945
- Genre: Popular
- Length: 22:45
- Label: Decca

Bing Crosby chronology
Blue Skies (w/ Fred Astaire and Irving Berlin) (1946)	Jerome Kern (1946)	St. Patrick's Day (1947)

Jerome Kern is a compilation album of phonograph records by Bing Crosby of songs written by Jerome Kern.

== Track listings ==
=== Original release ===
These songs were featured on a 4-disc, 78 rpm album set, Decca Album No. A-485.

- Disc 1 (23678): "Till the Clouds Roll By" / "Ol' Man River"
- Disc 2 (23679): "I've Told Ev'ry Little Star" / "Dearly Beloved"
- Disc 3 (23680): "Long Ago (and Far Away)" / "All Through the Day"
- Disc 4 (23681): "A Fine Romance" / "The Way You Look Tonight"

=== LP reissue ===
The 1949 10-inch LP album issue Decca DL 5001 consisted of eight songs on one 33 1/3 rpm record. All were reissues of earlier recordings.

All music is composed by Jerome Kern. Recording dates follow song titles.

Side one
No.	Title	Lyrics	Performed with	Length
1.	"Till the Clouds Roll By" (December 18, 1945)	Guy Bolton, P. G. Wodehouse	Camarata and His Orchestra	2:35
2.	"Ol' Man River" (December 31, 1945)	Oscar Hammerstein II	Camarata and His Orchestra	3:03
3.	"I've Told Ev'ry Little Star" (December 31, 1945)	Oscar Hammerstein II	Camarata and His Orchestra	2:46
4.	"Dearly Beloved" (May 3, 1944)	Johnny Mercer	John Scott Trotter and His Orchestra	2:42

Side two
No.	Title	Lyrics	Performed with	Length
1.	"Long Ago (and Far Away)" (May 3, 1944)	Ira Gershwin	John Scott Trotter and His Orchestra	2:53
2.	"All Through the Day" (December 31, 1945)	Oscar Hammerstein II	Camarata and His Orchestra	3:05
3.	"A Fine Romance" (August 19, 1936)	Dorothy Fields	Dixie Lee and Victor Young and His Orchestra	3:04
4.	"The Way You Look Tonight" (August 19, 1936)	Dorothy Fields	Dixie Lee and Victor Young and His Orchestra	2:37
