= Collectors' Classics, Vols. 1–8 =

Compilation album by Bing Crosby
- Released: 1951
- Recorded: 1934–1940
- Genre: Popular
- Length: 3:09:29 (total of all 8 albums)
- Label: Decca

Bing Crosby chronology
Go West Young Man (w/ The Andrews Sisters) (1950)	Collectors' Classics, Vols. 1–8 (1951)	Way Back Home (1951)

Collectors' Classics, Vols. 1–8 are a set of Decca Records compilation albums by Bing Crosby featuring songs from his various films over the years. The albums were issued as 10-inch LPs numbered DL6008 to DL6015 and 4-disc 45 rpm sets numbered 9–194 to 9–201.

== Background ==
In January 1951, Bing Crosby was honoured with various awards and special radio programs on what was described as his 20th anniversary as a single in show business. Decca celebrated by issuing this comprehensive set of the commercial recordings of songs from his films.

== Track listings ==
Track listings from Bing Crosby discography. Recording dates follow song titles.

=== Bing Crosby, Collectors' Classics – Vol. 1 ===
Track listing (DL 6008)

Side one (tracks 1–3 from Here Is My Heart; track 4 from The Big Broadcast of 1936)
No.	Title	Writer(s)	Performed with	Length
1.	"June in January" (November 9, 1934)	Ralph Rainger, Leo Robin	Georgie Stoll and His Orchestra	3:13
2.	"Love Is Just Around the Corner" (November 9, 1934)	Lewis E. Gensler, Leo Robin	Georgie Stoll and His Orchestra	3:00
3.	"With Every Breath I Take" (November 9, 1934)	Ralph Rainger, Leo Robin	Georgie Stoll and His Orchestra	3:09
4.	"I Wished on the Moon" (August 14, 1935)	Dorothy Parker, Ralph Rainger	The Dorsey Brothers Orchestra	3:05

Side two (from Mississippi)
No.	Title	Writer(s)	Performed with	Length
1.	"Soon"" (February 21, 1935)	Richard Rodgers, Lorenz Hart	Georgie Stoll and His Orchestra	3:01
2.	"Down by the River"" (February 21, 1935)	Richard Rodgers, Lorenz Hart	Georgie Stoll and His Orchestra	2:50
3.	"It’s Easy to Remember" (February 21, 1935)	Richard Rodgers, Lorenz Hart	The Rhythmettes, The Three Shades of Blue, and Georgie Stoll and His Orchestra	3:15
4.	"Swanee River (The Old Folks At Home)" (February 21, 1935)	Stephen Foster	Georgie Stoll and His Orchestra, and The Crinoline Choir	3:05
Total length:				24:38

=== Bing Crosby, Collectors' Classics – Vol. 2 ===
Track listing (DL 6009)

Side one (from Two for Tonight)
No.	Title	Writer(s)	Performed with	Length
1.	"Without a Word of Warning" (August 14, 1935)	Harry Revel, Mack Gordon	The Dorsey Brothers Orchestra	3:07
2.	"Takes Two to Make a Bargain" (August 14, 1935)	Harry Revel, Mack Gordon	The Dorsey Brothers Orchestra	2:48
3.	"I Wish I Were Aladdin" (August 14, 1935)	Harry Revel, Mack Gordon	The Dorsey Brothers Orchestra	2:59
4.	"From the Top of Your Head to the Tip of Your Toes" (August 14, 1935)	Harry Revel, Mack Gordon	The Dorsey Brothers Orchestra	3:03

Side two (track 1 from Two for Tonight; tracks 2–4 from Anything Goes)
No.	Title	Writer(s)	Performed with	Length
1.	"Two for Tonight" (August 14, 1935)	Harry Revel, Mack Gordon	The Dorsey Brothers Orchestra	2:56
2.	"Moonburn" (November 13, 1935)	Edward Heyman, Hoagy Carmichael	Georgie Stoll and His Orchestra	3:10
3.	"My Heart and I" (November 13, 1935)	Frederick Hollander, Leo Robin	Georgie Stoll and His Orchestra	3:22
4.	"Sailor Beware" (November 13, 1935)	Richard Whiting, Leo Robin	Georgie Stoll and His Orchestra	2:52
Total length:				24:17

=== Bing Crosby, Collectors' Classics – Vol. 3 ===
Track listing (DL 6010)

Side one (from Rhythm on the Range)
No.	Title	Writer(s)	Performed with	Length
1.	"I’m an Old Cowhand" (July 17, 1936)	Johnny Mercer	Jimmy Dorsey and His Orchestra	2:40
2.	"Empty Saddles" (July 14, 1936)	Billy Hill	Victor Young and His Orchestra	3:01
3.	"I Can't Escape from You" (July 17, 1936)	Leo Robin, Richard A. Whiting	Jimmy Dorsey and His Orchestra	3:12
4.	"The House That Jack Built for Jill" (July 17, 1936)	Frederick Hollander, Leo Robin,	Jimmy Dorsey and His Orchestra	2:45

Side two (from Pennies from Heaven)
No.	Title	Writer(s)	Performed with	Length
1.	"Pennies from Heaven" (July 24, 1936)	Arthur Johnston, Johnny Burke	Georgie Stoll and His Orchestra	3:08
2.	"Let's Call a Heart a Heart" (July 29, 1936)	Arthur Johnston, Johnny Burke	Georgie Stoll and His Orchestra	3:04
3.	"One, Two, Button Your Shoe" (July 29, 1936)	Arthur Johnston, Johnny Burke	Georgie Stoll and His Orchestra	2:50
4.	"So Do I" (July 24, 1936)	Arthur Johnston, Johnny Burke	Georgie Stoll and His Orchestra	3:10
Total length:				23:50

=== Bing Crosby, Collectors' Classics – Vol. 4 ===
Track listing (DL 6011)

Side one (from Waikiki Wedding)
No.	Title	Writer(s)	Performed with	Length
1.	"Sweet Leilani" (February 23, 1937)	Harry Owens	Lani McIntire and His Hawaiians	2:40
2.	"Blue Hawaii" (February 23, 1937)	Ralph Rainger, Leo Robin	Lani McIntire and His Hawaiians	3:07
3.	"In a Little Hula Heaven" (February 28, 1937)	Ralph Rainger, Leo Robin	Jimmy Dorsey and His Orchestra	3:10
4.	"Sweet Is the Word for You" (March 5, 1937)	Ralph Rainger, Leo Robin	Victor Young and His Orchestra	3:13

Side two (from Double or Nothing)
No.	Title	Writer(s)	Performed with	Length
1.	"The Moon Got in My Eyes" (July 12, 1937)	Arthur Johnston, Johnny Burke	John Scott Trotter and His Orchestra	3:13
2.	"(You Know It All) Smarty" (July 12, 1937)	Burton Lane, Ralph Freed	John Scott Trotter and His Orchestra	2:35
3.	"It’s the Natural Thing to Do" (July 12, 1937)	Arthur Johnston, Johnny Burke	John Scott Trotter and His Orchestra	3:13
4.	"All You Want to Do Is Dance" (July 12, 1937)	Arthur Johnston, Johnny Burke	John Scott Trotter and His Orchestra	2:51
Total length:				24:02

=== Bing Crosby, Collectors' Classics – Vol. 5 ===
Track listing (DL 6012)

Side one (from Sing You Sinners)
No.	Title	Writer(s)	Performed with	Length
1.	"Small Fry" (July 1, 1938)	Hoagy Carmichael, Frank Loesser	Johnny Mercer and Victor Young’s Small Fryers	3:06
2.	"Laugh and Call It Love" (July 11, 1938)	James V. Monaco, Johnny Burke	John Scott Trotter and His Orchestra	2:47
3.	"I've Got a Pocketful of Dreams" (July 11, 1938)	James V. Monaco, Johnny Burke	John Scott Trotter and His Orchestra	2:38
4.	"Don't Let That Moon Get Away" (July 11, 1938)	James V. Monaco, Johnny Burke	John Scott Trotter and His Orchestra	2:36

Side two (from Paris Honeymoon)
No.	Title	Writer(s)	Performed with	Length
1.	"You're a Sweet Little Headache" (November 4, 1938)	Ralph Rainger, Leo Robin	John Scott Trotter and His Orchestra	2:50
2.	"Joobalai" (November 4, 1938)	Ralph Rainger, Leo Robin	John Scott Trotter and His Orchestra	2:52
3.	"I Have Eyes" (November 4, 1938)	Ralph Rainger, Leo Robin	John Scott Trotter and His Orchestra	3:00
4.	"The Funny Old Hills" (November 4, 1938)	Ralph Rainger, Leo Robin	John Scott Trotter and His Orchestra	2:44
Total length:				22:33

=== Bing Crosby, Collectors' Classics – Vol. 6 ===
Track listing (DL 6013)

Side one (tracks 1–3 from Doctor Rhythm; track 4 from The Star Maker)
No.	Title	Writer(s)	Performed with	Length
1.	"On the Sentimental Side" (January 21, 1938)	James V. Monaco, Johnny Burke	John Scott Trotter and His Orchestra	2:51
2.	"My Heart Is Taking Lessons" (January 21, 1938)	James V. Monaco, Johnny Burke	John Scott Trotter and His Orchestra	2:45
3.	"This Is My Night to Dream" (January 21, 1938)	James V. Monaco, Johnny Burke	John Scott Trotter and His Orchestra	3:08
4.	"Schooldays" / "Sunbonnet Sue" / "Jimmy Valentine" / "If I Were a Millionaire" (medley) (July 30, 1938)	Gus Edwards, Will D. Cobb / Edwards, Cobb / Edwards, Edward Madden / Edwards, Cobb	John Scott Trotter and His Orchestra, and The Music Maids	3:10

Side two (from The Star Maker)
No.	Title	Writer(s)	Performed with	Length
1.	"An Apple for the Teacher" (June 22, 1939)	James V. Monaco, Johnny Burke	Connee Boswell and John Scott Trotter and His Orchestra	3:03
2.	"Still the Bluebird Sings" (June 9, 1939)	James V. Monaco, Johnny Burke	John Scott Trotter and His Orchestra	3:37
3.	"A Man and His Dream" (June 9, 1939)	James V. Monaco, Johnny Burke	John Scott Trotter and His Orchestra	3:02
4.	"Go Fly a Kite" (June 9, 1939)	James V. Monaco, Johnny Burke	John Scott Trotter and His Orchestra	2:39
Total length:				24:15

=== Bing Crosby, Collectors' Classics – Vol. 7 ===
Track listing (DL 6014)

Side one (from East Side of Heaven)
No.	Title	Writer(s)	Performed with	Length
1.	"East Side of Heaven" (March 10, 1939)	James V. Monaco, Johnny Burke	John Scott Trotter and His Orchestra	3:01
2.	"Sing a Song of Sunbeams" (March 10, 1939)	James V. Monaco, Johnny Burke	John Scott Trotter and His Orchestra	2:50
3.	"That Sly Old Gentleman" (March 10, 1939)	James V. Monaco, Johnny Burke	John Scott Trotter and His Orchestra	3:01
4.	"Hang Your Heart on a Hickory Limb" (March 10, 1939)	James V. Monaco, Johnny Burke	John Scott Trotter and His Orchestra	2:32

Side two (from Rhythm on the River)
No.	Title	Writer(s)	Performed with	Length
1.	"Only Forever" (July 3, 1940)	James V. Monaco, Johnny Burke	John Scott Trotter and His Orchestra	3:07
2.	"When the Moon Comes over Madison Square" (July 3, 1940)	James V. Monaco, Johnny Burke	John Scott Trotter and His Orchestra	2:38
3.	"That's For Me" (July 3, 1940)	James V. Monaco, Johnny Burke	John Scott Trotter and His Orchestra	3:05
4.	"Rhythm on the River" (July 3, 1940)	James V. Monaco, Johnny Burke	John Scott Trotter and His Orchestra	3:01
Total length:				23:15

=== Bing Crosby, Collectors' Classics – Vol. 8 ===
Track listing (DL 6015)

Side one (from If I Had My Way)
No.	Title	Writer(s)	Performed with	Length
1.	"I Haven’t Time to Be a Millionaire" (April 12, 1940)	James V. Monaco, Johnny Burke	John Scott Trotter and His Orchestra	3:09
2.	"April Played the Fiddle" (April 12, 1940)	James V. Monaco, Johnny Burke	John Scott Trotter and His Orchestra	3:00
3.	"The Pessimistic Character" (April 12, 1940)	James V. Monaco, Johnny Burke	John Scott Trotter and His Orchestra	2:28
4.	"Meet the Sun Half-Way" (April 12, 1940)	James V. Monaco, Johnny Burke	John Scott Trotter and His Orchestra	2:34

Side two (track 1 from If I Had Way; tracks 2–4 from Road to Singapore)
No.	Title	Writer(s)	Performed with	Length
1.	"If I Had My Way" (March 31, 1939)	James Kendis, Lou Klein	John Scott Trotter and His Orchestra	2:49
2.	"Sweet Potato Piper" (December 15, 1939)	James V. Monaco, Johnny Burke	John Scott Trotter’s Frying Pan Five, and The Foursome	2:22
3.	"Too Romantic" (December 15, 1939)	James V. Monaco, Johnny Burke	John Scott Trotter and His Orchestra	3:09
4.	"The Moon and the Willow Tree" (December 15, 1939)	Victor Schertzinger, Johnny Burke	John Scott Trotter and His Orchestra	3:08
Total length:				22:39
