= Top o' the Morning (1949 film) =

1949 film by David Miller

- Theatrical release poster
- Directed by: David Miller
- Written by: Edmund Beloin; Richard L. Breen
- Produced by: Robert L. Welch
- Starring: Bing Crosby; Ann Blyth; Barry Fitzgerald
- Cinematography: Lionel Lindon
- Edited by: Arthur P. Schmidt
- Music by: Robert Emmett Dolan
- Production company: Bing Crosby Productions
- Distributed by: Paramount Pictures
- Release date: August 31, 1949 (US)
- Running time: 100 minutes
- Country: United States
- Language: English
- Box office: $2.6 million

Top o' the Morning is a 1949 American romantic comedy film directed by David Miller and starring Bing Crosby, Ann Blyth, and Barry Fitzgerald.

== Plot ==
The famous Blarney Stone vanishes from a small Irish town and Joe Mulqueen, a singing American insurance investigator, arrives to recover it. In town Mulqueen meets Conn McNaughton, a local policeman's daughter, who says that Mulqueen's arrivial is part of an old legend prophesying the Blarney Stone's theft. Mulqueen later finds out that the theft of the stone was not the only crime that was committed.

== Cast ==
- Bing Crosby as Joe Mulqueen
- Ann Blyth as Conn McNaughton
- Barry Fitzgerald as Sergeant Briny McNaughton
- Hume Cronyn as Hughie Devine
- Eileen Crowe as Biddy O'Devlin
- John McIntire as Inspector Fallon
- Tudor Owen as Cormac Gillespie
- Jimmy Hunt as Pearse O'Neill
- Morgan Farley as Edwin Livesley
- John Eldredge as E. L. Larkin
- John "Skins" Miller as Dowdler
- John Costello as Village Gossip
- Dick Ryan as Clark O'Ryan
- Bernard Cauley as Boy
- Paul Connelly as Boy

== Reception ==
Bosley Crowther of The New York Times commented, "All things being considered, especially the memorable success of Paramount’s “Welcome Stranger” and its incomparable “Going My Way,” it naturally stood to reason that Bing Crosby and Barry Fitzgerald would eventually drift together in another sentimental comedy... And all those band-wagon Hibernians who like to picture Ireland as a land of eloquent talk and superstitions, bright-eyed colleens and Mr. Fitzgeralds, plus a great lot of singing and dancing, should find it entirely to their taste... Mr. Crosby wends a happy and comfortable course through the whole incredible proceedings, taking complacently in stride the fitful abuse of Mr. Fitzgerald and the romantic rue of Ann Blyth... Likewise, Mr. Fitzgerald is deliciously humorous in his busy displays of self-importance and police authority. And of course, he is simply stunning when he comes within range of a pint of ale..."

Variety said, "Bing Crosby, after two lush Technicolored musicals, has been handed a light, frothy and more moderately budgeted picture by Paramount to cavort in, which should put him once more at the top of that studio’s breadwinning list... Under David Miller’s light-handed direction, Crosby and the rest of the cast fall right into the spirit of the story. Groaner, despite his having to play to a gal (Ann Blyth) who is so obviously younger, is socko. His easy way with a quip, combined with his fine crooning of some old Irish tunes and a couple of new ones, is solid showmanship."

== Soundtrack ==
- "Top o' the Morning" (Jimmy Van Heusen / Johnny Burke): sung three times by Bing Crosby
- "When Irish Eyes Are Smiling": sung by Bing Crosby
- "Kitty of Coleraine" (Traditional Irish Air - Edward Lysaght): sung by Bing Crosby
- "The Donovans" (Alicia Adélaide Needham / Walter Kent / Francis Fahy): sung by Bing Crosby and group
- "You're in Love with Someone" (Jimmy Van Heusen / Johnny Burke): sung by Bing Crosby, and again by Bing Crosby and Ann Blyth
- "Oh, 'Tis Sweet to Think" (Thomas Moore): sung by Bing Crosby and Ann Blyth
- "Believe Me, If All Those Endearing Young Charms"

Bing Crosby recorded four of the songs for Decca Records. They were all issued on a 10" LP titled "Top o' the Morning / Emperor Waltz". Crosby's songs were also included in the Bing's Hollywood series.

== Radio adaptation ==
Lux Radio Theatre presented Top o' the Morning March 17, 1952. The one-hour episode featured Barry Fitzgerald, Dennis Day, and Ann Blyth.
