= St. Patrick's Day (album) =

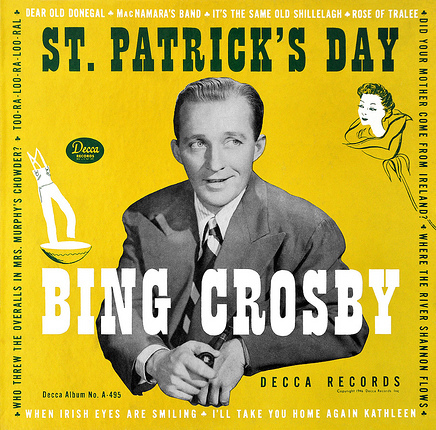

Compilation album by Bing Crosby
- Released: 1947 (original 78 rpm album); 1949 (10-inch LP album); 1949 (45 rpm album)
- Recorded: 1940, 1945, 1946
- Genre: Popular, Irish
- Length: 28:54 (original 78 rpm release); 22:49 (10-inch LP release); 22:47 (45 rpm release)
- Label: Decca

Bing Crosby chronology
Bing Crosby – Jerome Kern (1946)	St. Patrick's Day (1947)	Bing Crosby – Victor Herbert (1947)

St. Patrick's Day is a compilation album of phonograph records by Bing Crosby released in 1947 featuring songs with an Irish theme. This includes one of Crosby's most-beloved songs, "Too-Ra-Loo-Ra-Loo-Ral" which was number four on the Billboard Hot 100 for 12 weeks, and topped the Australian charts for an entire month, on shellac disc record. This version, the 1945 re-recording, was released earlier in another Crosby album, Selections from Going My Way.

== Reception ==
Billboard liked it:

Aiming at maximum holiday sales, this package of five platters brings together 10 Erin faves cut at varying times by Bing Crosby, getting vocal assist on some of the sides from the Jesters and the King's Men, while the music making belongs to Bob Haggart, Victor Young and John Scott Trotter. Der Bingle in good Erin form for each of the sides and song selections are tops ... Photo of the smiling Bing on the album cover, with notes on the singer and the songs in the accompanying booklet.

Down Beat was not impressed however saying:

Bing's album, despite his usual graceful ease of interpretation, lacks his old fullness of voice. If Crosby is going to keep on making records with his evident sloppiness and lack of interest, it would be better if he would stop now and let his millions of fans remember him by his older and far better discs.

The album quickly reached No. 3 in Billboard's best-selling popular record albums chart in March 1947 and was still selling well the following year when it reached No. 1 in the same chart on 20 March 1948. It was 18th in the annual chart of top selling record albums for 1948.

== Original track listing ==
These previously issued songs were featured on a 5-disc, 78 rpm album set, Decca Album No. A-495.

Side / Title	Writer(s)	Recording date	Performed with	Time
Disc 1 (23495):
A. "McNamara's Band"	Shamus O'Connor and John J. Stamford	December 6, 1945	the Jesters, and Bob Haggart and His Orchestra	2:40
B. "Dear Old Donegal"	Steve Graham	December 6, 1945	the Jesters, and Bob Haggart and His Orchestra	2:35
Disc 2 (23786):
A. "Who Threw the Overalls in Mrs. Murphy's Chowder?"	George L. Giefer	December 6, 1945	the Jesters, and Bob Haggart and His Orchestra	2:27
B. "It's the Same Old Shillelagh"	Pat White	December 6, 1945	the Jesters, and Bob Haggart and His Orchestra	2:44
Disc 3 (23787):
A. "Did Your Mother Come From Ireland?"	Jimmy Kennedy, Michael Carr	December 9, 1940	The King's Men and Victor Young and His Orchestra	3:10
B. "Where the River Shannon Flows"	James J. Russell	December 9, 1940	The King's Men and Victor Young and His Orchestra	3:06
Disc 4 (23788):
A. "The Rose of Tralee"	Charles W. Glover, E. Mordaunt Spencer	July 17, 1945	John Scott Trotter and His Orchestra	3:15
B. "When Irish Eyes Are Smiling"	Chauncey Olcott, George Graff Jr.	May 7, 1946	John Scott Trotter and His Orchestra	2:52
Disc 5 (23789):
A. "Too-Ra-Loo-Ra-Loo-Ral"	James Royce Shannon	July 17, 1945	John Scott Trotter and His Orchestra	3:17
B. "I'll Take You Home Again, Kathleen"	Thomas P. Westendorf	July 17, 1945	John Scott Trotter and His Orchestra	2:48

== LP track listing ==
The 1949 10-inch LP album issue Decca DL 5037 consisted of eight songs on one 33 1/3 rpm record. It left out two of the songs, "I'll Take You Home Again, Kathleen" and "Too-Ra-Loo-Ra-Loo-Ral". The album reached the No. 3 spot in Billboard's album charts in March 1951.

Side 1

1. "McNamara's Band"
2. "Dear Old Donegal"
3. "Who Threw the Overalls in Mrs. Murphy's Chowder?"
4. "It's the Same Old Shillelagh"

Side 2

5. "Did Your Mother Come From Ireland?"
6. "Where the River Shannon Flows"
7. "The Rose of Tralee"
8. "When Irish Eyes Are Smiling"

== Other releases ==
In 1949, the album along with the LP, was released on a set of four 45 rpm records on Decca 9–49. This version left out the songs "When Irish Eyes Are Smiling" and "The Rose of Tralee" Many of Crosby's Irish songs have been released on other newer albums, but no further incarnations of this album were produced.
