= Cowboy Songs (Bing Crosby album) =

Decca Presents: Bing Crosby in an Album of Cowboy Songs
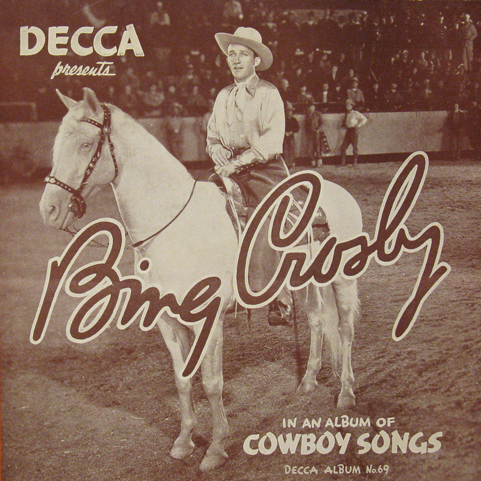

Compilation album by Bing Crosby
- Released: Original 78 album: 1939
- Recorded: 1935, 1936, 1937, 1938, 1939
- Genres: Popular, Western
- Label: Decca

Bing Crosby chronology
Patriotic Songs for Children (1939)	Decca Presents: Bing Crosby in an Album of Cowboy Songs (1939)	Victor Herbert Melodies, Vol. 2 (1939)

Cowboy Songs is a compilation album of phonograph records by Bing Crosby released in 1939 featuring Western songs.

== Background ==
Crosby had recorded cowboy songs for the first time in 1933 and he had a huge hit with "The Last Round-Up" that year on the Brunswick label. He recorded "Home on the Range" for the first time then also. Commenting on these early recordings, the writer Gary Giddins said "…it anticipated the golden age of gentle-voiced singing cowboys and the Irish sentiment of John Ford westerns that followed on their heels."

Moving on to the Decca label, Crosby had huge hits with "I’m an Old Cowhand", "Empty Saddles" and "Mexicali Rose". He also charted with "My Little Buckaroo" and "There’s a Gold Mine in the Sky". Giddins considered Bing's recordings in his book saying: "The most impressive of his new cowboy songs (including "We’ll Rest at the End of the Trail", "A Roundup Lullaby", "Empty Saddles") was "Twilight on the Trail", a lament introduced that year by Fuzzy Knight in The Trail of the Lonesome Pine and sung by Bing as though it were an old western hymn. That's how it may have sounded to President Roosevelt, who declared it his favorite song after "Home on the Range"; Mrs. Roosevelt requested Bing's record for the Roosevelt Library."

== Original track listing ==
These previously issued songs were featured on a 6-disc, 78 rpm album set, Decca Album No. 69.

Disc 1: (2676)

1. "Home on the Range", recorded June 14, 1939 with John Scott Trotter and His Orchestra (3:09)
2. "Missouri Waltz", recorded June 9, 1939 with Victor Young and His Orchestra (2:46)

Disc 2: (2677)

3. "Take Me Back to My Boots and Saddle", recorded November 10, 1935 with Victor Young and His Orchestra (2:42)
4. "Twilight on the Trail", recorded March 24, 1936 with Victor Young and His Orchestra (3:08)

Disc 3: (2678)

5. "We'll Rest at the End of the Trail", recorded March 24, 1936 with Victor Young and His Orchestra (2:53)
6. "There's a Gold Mine in the Sky", recorded October 14, 1938 with Eddie Dunstedter (2:57)

Disc 4: (2679)

7. "I'm an Old Cowhand (From the Rio Grande)", recorded July 17, 1936 with Jimmy Dorsey and His Orchestra (2:40)
8. "My Little Buckaroo", recorded March 8, 1937 with Victor Young and His Orchestra (3:00)

Disc 5: (2237)

9. "When the Bloom is on the Sage", recorded December 12, 1938 with the Foursome and John Scott Trotter's Frying Pan Five (2:52)
10. "It's A Lonely Trail", recorded December 19, 1938 with John Scott Trotter and His Orchestra (2:50)

Disc 6: (2001)

11. "Silver on the Sage", recorded July 11, 1938 with John Scott Trotter and His Orchestra (3:05)
12. "Mexicali Rose", recorded July 11, 1938 with John Scott Trotter and His Orchestra (2:48)
