= Bing and the Dixieland Bands =

Compilation album by Bing Crosby
- Released: 1951
- Recorded: 1942–1950
- Genre: Popular, Dixieland
- Length: 23:15
- Label: Decca

Bing Crosby chronology
Bing Crosby Sings the Song Hits from... (1951)	Bing and the Dixieland Bands (1951)	Yours Is My Heart Alone (1951)

Bing and the Dixieland Bands is a Decca Records album by Bing Crosby featuring songs with a Dixieland flavour which was issued as a 10” LP with catalog No. DL5323 and as a 4-disc 78 rpm box set (A-852) and as a 4-disc 45 rpm set (9–232).

== Background ==
Crosby biographer Gary Giddins quotes Artie Shaw in his book who said “(Bing) really is the first American jazz singer in the white world.” However his record producer Jack Kapp gradually moved Crosby away from his jazz influences into the mainstream. Every now and again though, he would have the opportunity to return to his jazz roots at a recording session and this album picks up a selection of such tracks.

Newsweek magazine covered the January 1946 session when two of the songs in the album were recorded and it sounds like a good time was had by all concerned. ‘“Blue and Broken-Hearted”, the first number to be waxed, didn’t go so well. A large blue screen-like sound absorber stood between Bing and the boys. Kicking it aside, he commented: “Got to see if anybody’s alive out there.” Another run-through or two and, at his question: “Will this be the deathless disk? Shall we, men?” the side joined history. “After You’ve Gone,” went rather quickly. Although trouble loomed when Jack Kapp, president of Decca and Crosby-adviser-extraordinary on record policy, walked in and asked if “Wild Bill” Davison’s trumpet ought to stay so dirty. “You go back to the board of directors if you make one more remark,” Crosby said. “I’ve flown these boys in at great expense. Eddie flew in without a plane.”

== Reception ==
The sides had all been previously issued as singles and “Feudin’ and Fightin’” reached No. 9 in the charts in 1947. Reviewers’ comments include:
Walking the Floor Over You – Again brother Bing goes on a Western kick with Bob Crosby’s Bob Cats. And for this trip he has picked a classic that for many weeks has been the top tune favorite at all the grange halls and hoe-down temples along the cattle trails. .. The charm, of course, lies in its naturalness and simplicity, which makes it just right for Crosby.
Feudin’ and Fightin’ – In high order in striking rhythmic style is his vocal fancying for the catchy mountain novelty “Feudin’ and Fightin’,” bringing out all the mountain humor of the lively ditty. The Jesters join their voices with Crosby on the chant with Bob Haggart’s music providing pert rhythmic beats...“Feudin’ and Fightin’” will find its way into jukes.
Jamboree Jones – Wonderfully gay and light-hearted Crosby effort on this collegiate paean of Johnny Mercer’s with superb support from The Tattlers and the Haggart backing.
The Dixieland Band – Another easy-flowing, happy rhythm novelty slicing which falls into the two-beat revival trend. Der Bingle delivers a completely relaxed job to an excellent Haggart backing.

== Track listing for 10" LP ==
Side one
No.	Title	Writer(s)	Performed with	Length
1.	"The Dixieland Band" (April 8, 1950)	Bernie Hanighen, Johnny Mercer	Bob Haggart and His Orchestra	2:36
2.	"Jamboree Jones" (April 8, 1950)	Johnny Mercer	Bob Haggart and His Orchestra, and The Tattlers	3:02
3.	"Walking the Floor Over You" (May 27, 1942)		Bob Crosby’s Bob Cats	3:08
4.	"When My Dream Boat Comes Home" (May 27, 1942)	Dave Franklin, Cliff Friend	Bob Crosby’s Bob Cats	2:24

Side two
No.	Title	Writer(s)	Performed with	Length
1.	"Blue (and Broken Hearted)" (January 16, 1946)	Lou Handman, Grant Clarke, Edgar Leslie	Eddie Condon and His Orchestra	3:03
2.	"After You’ve Gone" (January 16, 1946)	Turner Layton, Henry Creamer	Eddie Condon and His Orchestra	3:10
3.	"Feudin’ and Fightin’" (May 8, 1947)	Burton Lane, Al Dubin	Bob Haggart and His Orchestra, and The Jesters	3:15
4.	"Goodbye, My Lover, Goodbye" (May 8, 1947)	T. H. Allen	Bob Haggart and His Orchestra, and The Jesters	2:37

== Personnel ==
Bob Crosby’s Bob Cats Yank Lawson (trumpet); Floyd O'Brien (trombone); Matty Matlock (Clarinet); Eddie Miller (tenor sax); Jess Stacy (piano); Nappy Lamare (guitar); Bob Haggart (string bass); Ray Bauduc (drums).
Eddie Condon and His Orchestra Wild Bill Davison (trumpet); Brad Gowans (trombone); Joe Dixon (clarinet); Bud Freeman (tenor sax); Gene Schroeder (pianist on “Blue (and Broken Hearted)”); Joe Sullivan (pianist on “After You’ve Gone”); Eddie Condon (guitar).
