= Music of Hawaii (album) =

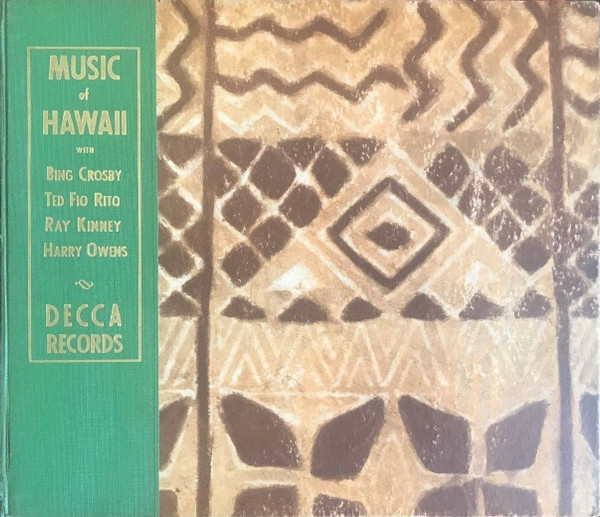

Compilation album by Bing Crosby, Ted Fio Rito, Harry Owens, Ray Kinney
- Released: 1939
- Recorded: 1936, 1938
- Genres: Popular, Hawaiian
- Label: Decca

Bing Crosby chronology
Music of Hawaii (1939)	Victor Herbert Melodies, Vol. One (1939)

Music of Hawaii is a compilation album containing five 78 rpm records of Hawaiian music issued by Decca Records.

== Background ==
Historically, the term "album" was applied to a collection of various items housed in a book format. In musical usage the word was used for collections of short pieces of printed music from the early 19th century. Later, collections of related 78 rpm records (singles) were bundled in book-like albums (one side of a 78 rpm record could hold only about 3.5 minutes of sound). The only way an "album" could be put together was to sell three or four 78s in a bound set of sheathes. These sets, known as folios were increasingly popular. Whilst they had originally been neutral – blank albums into which the distributor could insert whatever 78s he liked – the idea of using a theme to link the records in the folio was catching on. By the late 1930s, this trend had developed to the point where artists were going into studios to record six or eight titles with a folio set in mind. This in effect was the birth of the concept album, although it would not be until LPs became commonplace that the phrase gained any currency.

The first album issued by Decca Records, probably in 1938, was Moussorgsky Songs by Vladimir Rosing, on catalogue number A-1. Another early concept album was Music of Hawaii and eight songs were recorded for this in 1938. Possibly to boost its commercial appeal, two Hawaiian songs by Bing Crosby, which had been recorded two years earlier, were added to the album.

== Track listing ==
These reissued songs were featured in a 5-disc, 78 rpm album set, Decca Album No. A-10.

Disc 1: (880)

1. "Song of the Islands”, recorded July 23, 1936 by Bing Crosby, with Dick McIntire and His Harmony Hawaiians
2. "Aloha Oe (Farewell to Thee)” recorded July 23, 1936 by Bing Crosby, with Dick McIntire and His Harmony Hawaiians

Disc 2: (1908)

3. "Hawaiian Paradise” recorded April 13, 1938 by Harry Owens and His Orchestra
4. "My Isle of Golden Dreams” recorded April 4, 1938 by Harry Owens and His Orchestra

Disc 3: (1909)

5. "My Little Grass Shack in Kealakekua, Hawaii” recorded April 20, 1938 by Ted Fio Rito and His Orchestra
6. "King Kamehameha” recorded April 20, 1938 by Ted Fio Rito and His Orchestra

Disc 4: (1910)

7. "Across the Sea” recorded June 1, 1938 by Ray Kinney and His Hawaiians
8. "Ho‘onanea Hula” recorded June 1, 1938 by Ray Kinney and His Hawaiians

Disc 5: (1911)

9. "Old Plantation” recorded June 1, 1938 by Ray Kinney and His Hawaiians
10. "King's Serenade” recorded June 1, 1938 by Ray Kinney and His Hawaiians
