= Victor Herbert Melodies, Vol. 2 =

1939 compilation album

Decca Presents an Album of Victor Herbert Melodies, Vol. 2

Compilation album by Bing Crosby, Frances Langford, Florence George, Rudy Vallée
- Released: Original 78 album: 1939
- Recorded: 1938, 1939
- Genre: Popular
- Label: Decca

Bing Crosby chronology
Cowboy; Songs (1939)	Decca Presents an Album of Victor Herbert Melodies, Vol. 2 (1939)	George Gershwin Songs, Vol. One (1939)

Victor Herbert Melodies, Vol. 2 is a compilation album of phonograph records, recorded by Bing Crosby, Frances Langford, Florence George and Rudy Vallee celebrating the music of Victor Herbert. Most of the recordings were made in December 1938 by Decca Records, who were probably aware that a film called The Great Victor Herbert was being made by Paramount Pictures. An album titled Victor Herbert Melodies, Vol. 1 had been issued earlier in 1939. Victor Young and His Concert Orchestra provided the musical accompaniment to all of the tracks.

== Track listing ==
These newly issued songs were featured in a 5-disc 78 rpm album set, Decca Album No. A-72.

Disc 1: (2680)

1. "When You're Away", recorded on December 2, 1938 by Bing Crosby.
2. "Thine Alone", recorded on December 2, 1938 by Bing Crosby.

Disc 2: (2681)

3. "A Kiss in the Dark", recorded on December 9, 1938 by Frances Langford.
4. "Neath the Southern Moon”, recorded on December 9, 1938 by Frances Langford.

Disc 3: (2682)

5. "Kiss Me Again", recorded on July 14, 1939 by Florence George.
6. "I Want You to Marry Me", recorded on December 16, 1938 by Victor Young and His Concert Orchestra.

Disc 4: (2683)

7. "Moonbeams", recorded on December 19, 1938 by Rudy Vallée.
8. "To the Land of My Own Romance", recorded on December 16, 1938 by Victor Young and His Concert Orchestra.

Disc 5: (2684)

7. "Punchinella", recorded on December 13, 1938 by Victor Young and His Concert Orchestra.
8. "Pan America", recorded on December 13, 1938 by Victor Young and His Concert Orchestra.
