= Victor Herbert Melodies, Vol. 1 =

Decca Presents A Collection Of Victor Herbert Melodies, Vol. 1

Studio album by Bing Crosby, Frances Langford, Florence George, Rudy Vallée
- Released: Original 78 album: 1939
- Recorded: 1938
- Genre: Popular
- Label: Decca

Bing Crosby chronology
Music of Hawaii (1939)	Decca Presents A Collection Of Victor Herbert Melodies, Vol. 1 (1939)	Patriotic Songs for Children (1939)

Victor Herbert Melodies, Vol. 1 is a studio album featuring five 78 rpm phonograph records recorded by artists Bing Crosby, Frances Langford, Florence George and Rudy Vallee celebrating the music of Victor Herbert. The recordings were made in December 1938 by Decca Records, who were probably aware that a film called The Great Victor Herbert was being made by Paramount Pictures. Victor Young and His Orchestra provided the musical accompaniment to all of the tracks. The album was followed by a sequel Victor Herbert Melodies, Vol. 2

== Track listing ==
These newly issued songs were featured on a 5-disc, 78 rpm album set, Decca Album No. A-38.

Disc 1: (2315)

1. "Ah! Sweet Mystery of Life", recorded on December 2, 1938 by Bing Crosby
2. "Sweethearts", recorded on December 2, 1938 by Bing Crosby

Disc 2: (2316)

3. "I'm Falling in Love with Someone", recorded on December 9, 1938 by Bing Crosby and Frances Langford
4. "Gypsy Love Song”, recorded on December 9, 1938 by Bing Crosby and Frances Langford

Disc 3: (2317)

5. "Italian Street Song", recorded on December 17, 1938 by Florence George
6. "Selection from The Fortune Teller", recorded on December 13, 1938 by Victor Young and His Orchestra

Disc 4: (2318)

7. "Toyland", recorded on December 17, 1938 by Rudy Vallée
8. "March of the Toys", recorded on December 13, 1938 by Victor Young and His Orchestra

Disc 5: (2319)

9. "Indian Summer", recorded on December 13, 1938 by Victor Young and His Orchestra
10. "Yesterthoughts", recorded on December 13, 1938 by Victor Young and His Orchestra
