= Way Back Home (Bing Crosby album) =

Compilation album by Bing Crosby
- Released: 1951
- Recorded: 1944, 1949–1950
- Genre: Popular
- Length: 24:12
- Label: Decca

Bing Crosby chronology
Collectors' Classics (1950)	Way Back Home (1951)	Bing Crosby Sings the Song Hits from... (1951)

Way Back Home is a Decca Records compilation 78 rpm album of phonograph records by Bing Crosby, featuring sentimental and homely songs.

== Background ==
Bing Crosby had enjoyed unprecedented success during the 1940s, but his discography indicates that the hits were becoming less frequent. His record company — Decca — had enthusiastically embraced the relatively new vinyl long-playing discs by putting out many albums of his songs to counter the reduction in hit singles. This particular album was one of the last to be issued in all three formats of 78 rpm and 45 rpm albums as well as a 10-inch (250 mm) LP. Two of the songs had already been hits with "Just a Prayer Away" reaching the No. 4 spot and "Way Back Home" also charting.

== Reception ==
Billboard did not review the album, but it had reviewed many of the separate single issues.

'Way Back Home If it hadn't been for "Mule Train," this one would have swept at once. As it is, its success has only been delayed a bit. Song, an oldie, is a natural, and the Bing-Waring team do it mightily.

The Iowa Indian Song Bing makes strong medicine, with the Waring council whooping and tom-toming.

My Own Bit of Land Bing spreads warmth and a homey flavor in warbling this pleasing chunk of homespun philosophy. Fine for the family trade.

Just a Prayer Away — My Mother's Waltz There is plenty of vocal and instrumental embellishment to the spinning of these sides. But it's still to the credit of Bing Crosby that it is entirely his chanting that makes this couplet a desired one. For "Just a Prayer Away," singing the ballad at a moderately slow tempo, the Ken Darby Singers blend their voices with the organology of Ethel Smith and Victor Young's orchestra. Miss Smith's organ playing is pronounced throughout, and the entire company adds up to a simple setting that heightens Bing's simplicity in selling a song. Just as fitting and attractive is the setting created for Crosby's chanting of Dave Franklin's "My Mother's Waltz," rich in sentimental melodic and lyrical content, and sure to find immediate response among the three-quarter-time fans. For the phonos, "Just a Prayer Away" packs most of the nickel appeal where the fans are content to give a listen.

The Last Mile Home Bing evokes plenty of nostalgia with this warm rendition of a sentimental tune. Fine production backing.

The Meadows of Heaven Crosby and a chorus work over a pretty plug melody for attractive results.

== Track listing ==
The songs were featured on a four-disc, 78 rpm album set, Decca Album No. A-826.

Side	Title	Recording date	Writer	Performed with	Time
Disc 1: (24800)
A.	"'Way Back Home"	June 17, 1949	Tom Waring, Al Lewis	Fred Waring and His Pennsylvanians	3:11
B.	"The Iowa Indian Song (I-O-WUH)"	June 17, 1949	Meredith Willson	Fred Waring and His Pennsylvanians	3:13
Disc 2: (27441)
A.	"My Own Bit of Land"	December 22, 1949	Alex Kramer, Joan Whitney	The Ken Darby Singers and rhythm accompaniment	3:09
B.	"Early American"	June 23, 1950	Jimmy Van Heusen, Johnny Burke	Victor Young and his Orchestra	2:44
Disc 3: (27442)
A.	"Just a Prayer Away"	July 24, 1944	Dave Kapp, Charles Tobias	Ethel Smith (organ), Victor Young and his Orchestra, and the Ken Darby Singers	3:00
B.	"My Mother's Waltz"	July 24, 1944	Dave Franklin	Ethel Smith (organ), Victor Young and his Orchestra, and the Ken Darby Singers	2:48
Disc 4: (27443)
A.	"The Meadows of Heaven"	May 11, 1949	Joseph Meyer, Joseph McCarthy	Victor Young and his Orchestra, and the Ken Lane Singers	3:14
B.	"The Last Mile Home"	May 11, 1949	Walter Kent, Walton Farrar	Victor Young and his Orchestra, and the Ken Lane Singers	2:53

The songs were also featured on a four-disc, 45 rpm album set, catalog number 9-204.

== LP release ==
The songs were also featured on a 10" LP album, Decca DL 5310 issued in 1951. Side 1

1. "'Way Back Home"
2. "The Iowa Indian Song (I-O-WUH)"
3. "My Own Bit of Land"
4. "Early American"

Side 2

5. "Just a Prayer Away"
6. "My Mother's Waltz"
7. "The Meadows of Heaven"
8. "The Last Mile Home"
