= Bing Crosby Sings the Song Hits from... =

Studio album by Bing Crosby
- Released: 1951
- Recorded: 1949–1950
- Genre: Popular
- Length: 24:25
- Label: Decca Records

Bing Crosby chronology
Way Back Home (1951)	Bing Crosby Sings the Song Hits from... (1951)	Bing and the Dixieland Bands (1951)

Bing Crosby Sings the Song Hits from... is the twelfth solo studio album by American singer and actor Bing Crosby featuring songs from recent Broadway musicals issued as a 10” LP issued as catalog No. DL5298 and as a 4-disc 78 rpm box set (A-805) and as a 4-disc 45 rpm set (9–144).

== Reception ==
The sides were issued as singles also and received warm reviews from Billboard. Looking at "The Big Movie Show in the Sky" they said "Pretentious production number from “Texas L’il Darlin’” is performed impressively by Crosby and the Morgan organization." and for "The Yodel Blues" "Bing is especially convincing with this “Texas L’il Darlin’” lilt. He’s brilliantly supported by Morgan and vocal group." "If I Were a Bell" was highlighted by the magazine in their review. "Remarkably light and happy treatment of a cleverly carved rhythm item from “Guys and Dolls” should bring in heavy returns. Patti and Bing's adroit sense of humor make this one of high spot diskings of the day."

Variety commented: "Stay Well / The Little Gray House - Bing Crosby endows this coupling from the B’way musical hit, “Lost In The Stars,” with one of his better, more relaxed and tonally rich baritonings."

The writer Will Friedwald discussing Crosby's recordings of show tunes said that "My particular favorites are a pair of songs from Kurt Weill and Maxwell Anderson’s Lost in the Stars, “Stay Well” and “The Little Gray House.”... Of all the many lesser known Crosby performances, particularly from the postwar era, these are the ones that most deserve to be heard again."

== Track listing for 10" LP ==
Recording dates follow track titles.

Side one
No.	Title	Writer(s)	Performed with	Length
1.	"Marrying for Love" (from Call Me Madam) (September 21, 1950)	Irving Berlin	Sonny Burke and His Orchestra	2:54
2.	"The Best Thing for You (Would Be Me)" (from Call Me Madam) (September 21, 1950)	Berlin	Sonny Burke and His Orchestra	3:20
3.	"If I Were a Bell" (from Guys and Dolls) (September 7, 1950)	Frank Loesser	Patty Andrews and Vic Schoen and His Orchestra	3:08
4.	"I've Never Been in Love Before" (from Guys and Dolls) (September 7, 1950)	Frank Loesser	Axel Stordahl and his Orchestra	2:54

Side two
No.	Title	Writer(s)	Performed with	Length
1.	"The Little Gray House" (from Lost in the Stars) (November 16, 1949)	Anderson, Weill	John Scott Trotter and His Orchestra, and the Jud Conlon Singers	3:00
2.	"Stay Well" (from Lost in the Stars) (November 16, 1949)	Anderson, Weill	John Scott Trotter and His Orchestra, and the Jud Conlon Singers	2:53
3.	"The Yodel Blues" (December 23, 1949)	Dolan, Mercer	Russ Morgan and his Orchestra, and The Morganaires	3:17
4.	"The Big Movie Show in the Sky" (from Texas, Li'l Darlin) (December 23, 1949))	Dolan, Mercer	Russ Morgan and his Orchestra, and The Morganaires	2:59
