= It's the Same Old Shillelagh =

Song by Pat White
- Released: 1927
- Genre: Novelty song
- Label: Yorkville
- Songwriter: Pat White

"It's the Same Old Shillelagh" is an Irish novelty song written by Pat White. Its subject is a young Irish-American who inherits his father's shillelagh. The composer himself recorded this song on May 25, 1927 for Victor Records (No. 20760), and the record was distributed through the Yorkville Phonograph Shop in New York City. RCA Victor pressed the record, but it carried a custom "Yorkville" label.

It was recorded by various artists of Irish-American ancestry, such as Billy Murray (recorded with Harry's Tavern Band, Bluebird 10811, 1940) and most notably Bing Crosby (recorded December 6, 1945 and included in his album St. Patrick's Day), typically with an affected Irish accent.

Dennis Day included the song on his album Shillelaghs & Shamrocks! (1961).

Glen Daly included the song on his album It's Glen Again - "Live" at the Ashfield, Glasgow (1970).

== Lyrics ==
An early, public version:

Sure it's the same old shillelagh
Me father brought from Ireland.
And divil a man prouder than He,
As he walked with it in his hand.
He'd lead the band on Paddy's Day
And twirle it round his mitt
And divil a bit we'd laught at it
Or Dad would have a fit
Sure with the same old shillelagh
Me father could lick a dozen men
As fast as they'd get up be gorry,
He'd knock'em down again
And many's the time he used it on me
To make me understand
The same old shillelagh
Me father brought from Ireland.

The Bing Crosby version:

Oh, 50 years ago, me father left old Erins shore
He landed here, a Shillelagh in hand and devil a little more
He got a job, then got a wife, then a family
And then he died and left his old shillelagh stick to me

Sure it's the same old shillelagh me father brought from Ireland
And devil a man prouder than he, as he walked with it in his hand
He'd lead the band on Paddy's Day and twirl it 'round his mitt
And devil a bit, we'd laughted at it, poor dad would have a fit.

Sure with the same old shillelagh, me father could lick a dozen men
As fast as they'd get up be gory, he'd knock 'em down again
And many's the time he used it on me to make me understand
The same old shillelagh, me father brought from Ireland

I'm going on the police force, it's the only thing to do
Instead of having one night stick, be gory, I'll have two
If there's a fight I'll be alright, nobody bothers me
Because I have the old Shillelagh me father gave to me

Sure it's the same old shillelagh me father brought from Ireland
And devil a man prouder than he, as he walked with it in his hand
He'd lead the band on Paddy's Day and twirl it 'round his mitt
And devil a bit, we'd laughed at it or Dad would have a fit

Sure with the same old shillelagh me father could lick a dozen men
As fast as they'd get up be gory, he'd knock 'em down again
And many's the time he used it on me to make me understand
The same old shillelagh me father brought from Ireland

Sure it's the same old shillelagh me father brought from Ireland
And devil a man prouder than he, as he walked with it in his hand
He'd lead the band on Paddy's Day and twirl it 'round his mitt
And devil a bit, we'd laughed at it or Dad would have a fit

Sure with the same old shillelagh me father could lick a dozen men
As fast as they'd get up be gory, he'd knock 'em down again
And many's the time he used it on me to make me understand
The same old shillelagh me father brought from Ireland
The same old shillelagh he brought from Ireland
