= Selections from Showboat =

1948 compilation album

Compilation album by Bing Crosby, Frances Langford, Tony Martin, Kenny Baker, Lee Wiley
- Released: Original 78 album: 1948; 10” LP DL 5060: 1949; 7” 45rpm box set 1949
- Recorded: 1939–1947
- Genre: Popular
- Label: Decca Records

Bing Crosby chronology
Blue of the Night (1948)	Selections from Showboat (1948)	The Emperor Waltz (1948)

Selections from Showboat is a Decca Records compilation album of phonograph records featuring songs from the Jerome Kern / Oscar Hammerstein II musical Show Boat.

== Track listing ==
These songs were featured on a four 10-inch 78 rpm album set, Decca Album No. A-619.

Disc 1: (25259)

1. “Ol’ Man River”, recorded by Bing Crosby on December 31, 1945 with Camarata and His Orchestra.
2. ““I Still Suits Me”, recorded by Bing Crosby and Lee Wiley on March 17, 1947 with Victor Young and His Orchestra.

Disc 2: (25260)

3. “Make Believe”, recorded by Kenny Baker on June 26, 1942 with Harry Sosnik and His Orchestra.
4. ”You Are Love”, recorded by Kenny Baker on June 26, 1942 with Harry Sosnik and His Orchestra.

Disc 3: (25261)

5. “Can't Help Lovin' Dat Man”, recorded by Frances Langford on June 14, 1942 with Harry Sosnik and His Orchestra.
6. “Bill” recorded by Frances Langford on June 14, 1942 with Harry Sosnik and His Orchestra

Disc 4: (25262)

7. “Why Do I Love You?” recorded by Frances Langford and Tony Martin on July 19, 1942 with Victor Young and His Orchestra.
8. “All the Things You Are”, recorded by Tony Martin on December 19, 1939 with Ray Sinatra and His Orchestra. (This song is from the musical "Very Warm for May", not “Show Boat”.)

== LP release ==
The album was also issued as a 10-inch vinyl LP in 1949 with the catalogue number DL 5060.

== LP track listing ==
SIDE ONE

1. “Ol’ Man River”
2. “I Still Suits Me”
3. “Make Believe”
4. “You Are Love”

SIDE TWO

1. “Can't Help Lovin' Dat Man”
2. “Bill”
3. “Why Do I Love You?”
4. “All the Things You Are”

== Other release ==
The album was also issued as a 4-disc 45 rpm box set in 1949 (Catalogue No. 9-14).
