= Top o' the Morning / Emperor Waltz =

Top o' the Morning / Emperor Waltz: Selections from the Paramount Pictures

Studio album by Bing Crosby. Ann Blyth
- Released: 1950
- Recorded: 1947, 1949
- Genre: Popular
- Length: 23:41
- Label: Decca

Bing Crosby chronology
Ichabod – The Legend of Sleepy Hollow (1949)	Top o' the Morning / Emperor Waltz: Selections from the Paramount Pictures (1950)	Songs from Mr. Music (w/ The Andrews Sisters and Dorothy Kirsten) (1950)

Top o' the Morning / Emperor Waltz is a Decca Records studio album of phonograph records by Bing Crosby of songs from his movies Top o' the Morning and The Emperor Waltz, catalog number DL 5272.

== Background ==
Bing Crosby had recorded the songs from his film Top o' the Morning in May and June 1949 and these were released on two separate 78 records to tie in with the film’s premiere on August 31, 1949. Following the development of the vinyl LP record by Columbia Records in 1948, Decca issued a plethora of Crosby albums in that format. Many were simply reissues of earlier 78 rpm albums but Top o' the Morning / Emperor Waltz appears to be the first 10-inch LP not to have been issued as a 78 rpm album. As the four songs from Top o' the Morning only filled one side of the LP, Decca added the four songs from the successful Bing Crosby – The Emperor Waltz 78 rpm album to complete the record.

== Reception ==
Billboard reviewed the songs from “Top o’ the Morning” when they were issued as singles, saying:

Oh, ‘Tis Sweet to Think
Bing and the fem lead from “Top o’ the Morning” do an art song—lyrics by Thomas Moore—charmingly. Not for the masses.
The Donovans
More from the score—and as Irish as Barry Fitzgerald’s phiz. Special stuff—may appeal in the Gaelic nabes.
You’re in Love with Someone
A Burke-Van Heusen pop from “Top o’ the Morning” gets the tender treatment from Bing.
Top o’ the Morning
Irish and quaint as all get-out is the title tune, a small lesson in Gaelic a la Berlitz.

== Track listing ==
Recording dates follow song titles.

Side one
No.	Title	Writer(s)	Performed with	Length
1.	"You're in Love with Someone" (May 10, 1949)	Jimmy Van Heusen, Johnny Burke	Victor Young and His Orchestra, and the Jeff Alexander Chorus	2:38
2.	"Top o' the Morning" (June 21, 1949)	Jimmy Van Heusen, Johnny Burke	Victor Young and His Orchestra, and the Jeff Alexander Chorus	2:48
3.	"Oh, 'Tis Sweet to Think" (May 31, 1949)	Thomas Moore	Ann Blyth and Simon Rady and His Orchestra	3:23
4.	"The Donovans" (June 21, 1949)	Alicia Adélaide Needham, Walter Kent, Francis Fahy	Victor Young and His Orchestra, and the Jeff Alexander Chorus	3:00

Side two
No.	Title	Writer(s)	Performed with	Length
1.	"Friendly Mountains" (March 17, 1947)	Johnny Burke	Victor Young and His Orchestra	3:04
2.	"The Kiss in Your Eyes" (January 17, 1947)	Richard Heuberger, Johnny Burke	Victor Young and His Orchestra	3:01
3.	"I Kiss Your Hand, Madame" (January 17, 1947)	Sam M. Lewis, Joe Young, Ralph Erwin	Victor Young and His Orchestra	3:09
4.	"Emperor Waltz" (March 17, 1947)	Johann Strauss, Johnny Burke	Victor Young and His Orchestra	2:38
