= The Emperor Waltz =

1948 film by Charles Brackett, Billy Wilder

- Theatrical release poster
- Directed by: Billy Wilder
- Written by: Billy Wilder; Charles Brackett
- Produced by: Charles Brackett
- Starring: Bing Crosby; Joan Fontaine; Richard Haydn; Sig Ruman
- Cinematography: George Barnes
- Edited by: Doane Harrison
- Music by: Victor Young
- Production company: Paramount Pictures
- Distributed by: Paramount Pictures
- Release dates: May 26, 1948 (Hollywood, Los Angeles, premiere)
- Running time: 106 minutes
- Country: United States
- Language: English
- Budget: $3.8 million
- Box office: $4 million (U.S. and Canada rentals)

The Emperor Waltz (German: Ich küsse Ihre Hand, Madame) is a 1948 American musical film directed by Billy Wilder, and starring Bing Crosby and Joan Fontaine. Written by Wilder and Charles Brackett, the film follows a brash American gramophone salesman in Austria at the turn of the twentieth century who tries to convince Emperor Franz Joseph to buy a gramophone so the product will gain favor with the Austrian people. The Emperor Waltz was inspired by a real-life incident involving Franz Joseph I of Austria. Filmed in Jasper National Park in Canada, The Emperor Waltz premiered in London, Los Angeles, and New York in the spring of 1948, and was officially released in the United States on July 2, 1948. In 1949, the film received Academy Award nominations for Best Costume Design and Best Music, as well as a Writers Guild of America Award nomination for Best Written American Musical.

== Plot ==
At the turn of the twentieth century, traveling salesman Virgil Smith (Bing Crosby) takes multiple journeys to Vienna, Austria, hoping to sell a gramophone to Emperor Franz Joseph, whose purchase of the recent American invention could spur its popularity with the Austrian people. At the same time, Countess Johanna Augusta Franziska von Stolzenberg-Stolzenberg (Joan Fontaine) and her father, Baron Holenia, are celebrating the fact their black poodle Scheherazade has been selected to mate with the emperor's poodle. As they depart from the palace, they meet Virgil and his white Fox Terrier Buttons, whose scuffle with Scheherazade leads to a discussion about class distinctions.

When Scheherazade experiences a nervous breakdown, she is treated by veterinarian Dr. Zwieback, who practices Freudian psychology, and he advises Johanna to force her dog to face Buttons in order to dissipate her fear. When the dogs are reunited, romantic sparks begin to fly between not only the animals but their owners as well. They begin to spend a great deal of time together, during which Scheherazade and the salesman's dog mate, unbeknownst to their owners.

Virgil eventually convinces Johanna true love can overcome their social differences, and he asks the emperor for her hand in marriage. This is the crucial scene in the picture, and brings the otherwise lightweight movie plot to a higher level. The Emperor is cordial and fatherly with Virgil, and treats him with respect and even a bit of admiration. But he is certain Johanna could never be happy living in Newark, New Jersey. "We are not better than you", explains the Emperor sadly, "I think perhaps you are better than us. But we are like snails: If you take us out of our majestic shells, we die."

Finally, the Emperor tells Virgil of the disastrous end to several similar matches he has seen in his long life, and makes him an offer: He will endorse the gramophone—which will lead to enormous sales and profits for Virgil—only if he breaks up with Johanna. Virgil refuses, highly insulted, but the Emperor asks him one more question: Are you sure you will be enough for her?

The question strikes home, and Virgil decides he loves Johanna too much to take a chance on ruining her life. He lies to her, saying he used her only in order to gain access to the emperor to sell his wares, and walks out apparently uncaring, making himself the villain.

Several months later when Scheherazade gives birth to a litter of white puppies with black patches, it is obvious they were sired by Buttons and not, as everyone thought, by the Emperor's poodle. Fearing the Emperor's reaction, Baron Holenia tells the Emperor they were stillborn, and secretly orders them drowned. However, Virgil, who has sneaked into the palace to see Johanna one last time and set the record straight before he leaves for America, rescues the puppies and confronts the Emperor, who he thinks has ordered the drowning. The Emperor demands an explanation from Holenia, chastises him severely, and asks Virgil to give him the puppies.

But Virgil is still furious, and continues to berate the Emperor about class snobbery which he sees as the reason Holenia tried to drown the pups. He is so angry that he forgets Johanna is standing there listening and tells the Emperor he never should have agreed to give up Johanna to save her from a commoner's life with him. Johanna realises what Virgil has done and forgives him, and tells the Emperor that better she take one chance in a million of a happy life with Virgil, than no chance at all with someone she cannot love. The Emperor agrees to let Virgil and Johanna wed.

== Cast ==
- Bing Crosby as Virgil Smith
- Joan Fontaine as Countess Johanna Augusta Franziska
- Roland Culver as Baron Holenia
- Lucile Watson as Princess Bitotska
- Richard Haydn as Emperor Franz Joseph
- Sig Ruman as Dr. Zwieback
- Harold Vermilyea as Chamberlain
- Julia Dean as Archduchess Stephanie
- Bert Prival as Chauffeur
- Alma Macrorie as Inn Proprietress
- Roberta Jonay as Chambermaid
- John Goldsworthy as Obersthofmeister
- Cyril Delevanti as Diplomat (uncredited)
- Frank Mayo as Politician (uncredited)

== Production ==
Following the release of The Lost Weekend in late 1945, Billy Wilder and Charles Brackett began to collaborate on a film about the problems faced by American military personnel stationed in Europe following World War II. Wilder went to Europe to research the project, but his visits to the concentration camps so disturbed him he returned to Hollywood determined to write and direct a musical comedy instead. He had known Bing Crosby since the crooner's days with Paul Whiteman, and he and Brackett had contributed to Crosby's film Rhythm on the River (1940). Since Crosby was Paramount's leading star and Wilder was the studio's top director, it was easy to convince executives to greenlight a collaboration between the two men. Wilder recalled reading about Valdemar Poulsen, a Danish inventor who had demonstrated a magnetic recording device for Franz Joseph I of Austria in the hope the Emperor would help finance his invention, and he and Brackett used this bit of historical fact as the starting point for their screenplay, which initially was titled Viennese Story.

Principal photography began in Jasper National Park in the Canadian Rockies in the province of Alberta in June 1946. It cost the studio $20,000 to have pines shipped from California and planted on location because Wilder was unhappy with the look of the native trees. He also planted 4,000 white daisies dyed blue so they would photograph better.

Working with Bing Crosby proved to be problematic from the start. Between scenes he barely interacted with leading lady Joan Fontaine, on loan from RKO Radio Pictures, who later recalled: "Crosby wasn't very courteous to me ... There was never the usual costar rapport. I was a star at that time, but he treated me like he'd never heard of me." The singer tended to ignore his director as well. According to Fontaine: "It wasn't that he had anything against Mr. Wilder. He just didn't pay much attention to him. He told me once that he had some trouble understanding his funny accent." Worst of all, Crosby tended to alter his dialogue, saying it "as he felt it at the moment", and Wilder was known for insisting his lines be delivered exactly as written. "Bing Crosby operated for himself, not for the group or the film", Wilder recalled. "He was a big star, the biggest, and he thought he knew what was good for him. He sensed what his audience expected and he knew how to deliver that. The picture didn’t come out what I wanted, but that wasn’t Crosby’s fault. It was mine.” Another book has an opposing view stating "Contradicting other accounts, Wilder also claims a good working relationship with Crosby."

The Canadian weather proved to be uncooperative, Fontaine was ill for a period of time, and at one point Wilder underwent minor surgery. As a result, the film ran over schedule and budget, and Wilder ran into problems during post-production. It was his first color film, and he was dissatisfied with the way the exteriors had been photographed in Technicolor. He had much of the flora native to the area hand-painted to give it a more authentic look. Although principal photography was completed in September 1946, it wasn't until April 30, 1948, that the film premiered in London. It opened in Los Angeles on May 26, at Radio City Music Hall in New York City on June 17, and went into wide theatrical release in the United States on July 2.

Wilder later confessed, "The picture didn't come out what I wanted ... I was looking back at my childhood in Austria—waltzes, Tyrolean hats, cream puffs—shutting out what came later", a reference to the war-torn Vienna he visited prior to the film's start. "I would like to have done the picture as a tribute to Lubitsch. A tribute to Lubitsch, it was not."

== Score ==
The film's underscore was composed by Victor Young. Bing Crosby had some success with "The Kiss in Your Eyes", with lyrics by Johnny Burke and a melody from the operetta Der Opernball by Richard Heuberger. Burke also contributed lyrics to "Friendly Mountains", based on two Austrian yodeling songs, and "The Emperor Waltz", with music by Johann Strauss II, and he and Jimmy Van Heusen collaborated on "Get Yourself a Phonograph". The latter song was not used in the final version of the film."I Kiss Your Hand, Madame" was by Fritz Rotter and Ralph Erwin, and Arthur Pryor wrote "Whistler and His Dog". Also heard in the film is "Santa Lucia", a barcarolle from Naples popularized by Venetian gondoliers. Crosby recorded four of the songs for Decca Records in January and March 1947 and they were issued as a 2-disc 78 rpm album. Crosby's songs were also included in the Bing's Hollywood series.

== Reception ==
The film was placed in 14th in the list of top-grossing films in the US in 1948 taking $3,209,000.

Bosley Crowther of The New York Times observed while the movie premiered at the Radio City Music Hall: "Picture it all in Technicolor, with the courtiers in flashing uniforms, the ladies in elegant dresses and Bing in an old straw hat, and you have a fair comprehension of the prospect and atmosphere ... Brackett and Wilder have made up with casualness and charm—and with a great deal of clever sight-humor—for the meagerness of the idea. And Bing has provided the substance which the farcical bubble may lack ... Set against gorgeous mountain scenery and richly palatial rooms, The Emperor Waltz is a project which should turn the blue Danube to twinkling gold."

Variety said the film "has a free-and-easy air that perfectly matches the Crosby style of natural comedy. Co-star Joan Fontaine, better known for heavy, serious roles, demonstrates adaptability that fits neatly into the lighter demands and she definitely scores with charm and talent as the Crosby foil."

John McCarten of The New Yorker called the film "a pleasant bit of spoofing", adding, "This is ancient stuff, all right, but Bing Crosby, in the role of the phonograph salesman, makes everything seem effortless and diverting, and Joan Fontaine, as the countess, reveals a nice talent for farce." A later assessment by Channel 4 states, "This sweet and sickly fare might just remain as a forgettable little trifle, were it not for the pen and lens of Wilder, one of the greats. There are so few bad Wilder films that one this awful and irredeemable is heart-breaking."

== Awards and nominations ==
Edith Head and Gile Steele were nominated for the Academy Award for Best Color Costume Design but lost to Dorothy Jeakins and Barbara Karinska for Joan of Arc. It was the first year an award in this category was presented. Victor Young was nominated for the Academy Award for Best Scoring of a Musical Picture but lost to Johnny Green and Roger Edens for Easter Parade.

Wilder and Brackett were nominated for the Writers Guild of America Award for Best Written American Musical, but lost to Sidney Sheldon, Frances Goodrich, and Albert Hackett for Easter Parade.
