= Edward Lewis (Decca) =

English businessman, founder of Decca Records (1900–1980)

Sir Edward Lewis
- Sir Edward Lewis, pictured around 1970
- Born: Edward Roberts Lewis; 19 April 1900; Derby, England
- Died: 29 January 1980 (aged 79); Chelsea, London, England
- Education: Rugby School; Trinity College, Cambridge
- Occupation: Business entrepreneur
- Known for: Decca Records

Sir Edward Roberts Lewis (19 April 1900 – 29 January 1980) was an English businessman, best known for leading the Decca recording and technology group for five decades from 1929. He built the company up from nothing to one of the major record labels of the world.

A financier by profession, Lewis was professionally engaged by the fledgling Decca company. Having failed to persuade its directors to diversify from making record-players to making records, he raised the capital to take the company over, and ran it until his death. Among the ground-breaking achievements of Decca under Lewis were the Decca Navigator System (the leading maritime and aviation navigation system prior to GPS), the Decca "ffrr" recording technology, and the first release on record of Wagner's Ring cycle.

== Biography ==
=== Early years ===
Lewis was born in Derby, the only son of four children of Sir Alfred Edward Lewis (1868–1940) and his wife, May née Roberts. Alfred Lewis was a senior official, and later head, of the National Provincial Bank. Lewis was educated at Rugby School and Trinity College, Cambridge.

After leaving Cambridge, Lewis worked in the financial sector, joining the London Stock Exchange. In 1923, he married Margaret Mary ('Masie') Hutton. There were two sons of the marriage, one of whom died, while still a boy, in a drowning accident. The other son later became the senior partner in Lewis's stockbroking firm. The firm, E. R. Lewis & Co, was founded when Lewis was 28, and was still trading after his death. Lewis also had a much younger daughter, Pat.

Lewis's firm acted as brokers for a company that had recently changed its name to The Decca Gramophone Company. It manufactured recording and play-back equipment and had developed the world's first portable gramophone. With Lewis's help, Decca was successfully floated as a public company. The share issue was oversubscribed twenty times over.

=== Decca ===
Despite the success of the public offering, Lewis had reservations about Decca's future. He remarked that "a company manufacturing gramophones but not records is rather like one making razors but not consumable blades". He proposed that Decca, which already had a global reputation and distribution network, should use them to expand into making and selling records, potentially a much more profitable activity than merely making equipment.

The Duophone Record Company, with its record factory in the London suburb of New Malden, was in difficulties, and Lewis tried to persuade the directors of Decca to buy it. They did not wish to do so, and so Lewis formed a syndicate and proceeded with the purchase, not only of Duophone, but of Decca itself. The new Decca Record Company came under the management of Lewis's reconstituted Decca Gramophone Company in 1929. That year, however, was the year of the Wall Street crash and the collapse of financial markets. The record industry suffered along with most others. Within a year, Decca's bankers were threatening to withdraw credit, and Lewis insisted on bold moves to keep the new company competitive with its huge, established rival, EMI, formed by the merger of the Gramophone Company and Columbia. He cut the retail price of Decca records to less than half that of EMI's and secured the resignation of Decca's managing director, S. C. Newton, whose role Lewis effectively took over, though he was never officially more than a member of the board of directors until 1957 when he took the title of chairman.

At this point, Decca was primarily a popular music label. Lewis secured new artists for the label, including Gertrude Lawrence and Jack Hylton, and Decca took over the UK manufacture and distribution of the American Brunswick Records, which brought leading popular American artists, such as Bing Crosby and Al Jolson, to the Decca group. On the classical side, Decca issued some Handel Concerti Grossi, conducted by Ernest Ansermet, as early as December 1929, but most of its classical releases came from the Polydor catalogue, to which Lewis had acquired the British rights for Decca. By the mid-1930s, Decca was enlarging its domestic classical catalogue with artists such as Sir Henry Wood, Clifford Curzon, Sir Hamilton Harty and Boyd Neel. Despite Lewis's financial skill, and rigorous economies throughout the company, Decca's survival remained at risk until 1934, when the company began to make inroads into the profitable American market. When World War II broke out in 1939, Lewis sold his interest in Decca's American subsidiary.

=== World War II and post-war years ===
Having narrowly survived the 1930s, Decca flourished during the war. Record sales went up, which Lewis attributed to the demand for entertainment at home rather than in theatres. The success of the record division of the group was mirrored by that of the technical division, which played a crucial and remunerative part in the development of radar and other navigational equipment. From this sprang Decca's revolutionary new recording technique known as "ffrr" (full frequency range recording), introduced in 1944, which put Decca far ahead of its rivals in the realism of sound on its discs. At the end of the war, Lewis authorised the expansion of Decca's classical programme to make it international, with recordings in Paris, Amsterdam, Zurich, Geneva, Bayreuth and Vienna. The producer John Culshaw wrote, "Within five years of the end of the war Decca was well and truly in the big league." In 1947, Lewis established a new American subsidiary of British Decca, London Records.

Lewis was a shrewd picker of employees and associates. His choice of Culshaw, the pioneering engineer Arthur Haddy, and the international manager Maurice Rosengarten were crucial to Decca's success. Lewis kept Decca ahead of the British competition by launching the long-playing record in Europe in June 1950, following the example of American Columbia, and encouraging the development of stereophony as early as 1954. In the early 1960s, Decca rejected The Beatles at an audition, but did sign The Rolling Stones and other successful groups. On the classical side, Lewis took the risk of backing Culshaw's hugely expensive plan to make a high-quality studio recording of Wagner's Ring cycle which, to the amazement and envy of Decca's rivals, proved to be a best-seller.

=== Later years ===
In the Oxford Dictionary of National Biography, Peter Martland writes of Lewis: "Like many who create, build, and retain close personal control over large enterprises, Lewis was unable to appoint a successor or relinquish control of the business. As a consequence, in 1980, days before his death, the business, then in the grip of a serious financial crisis, was sold." (Note: The sale was to PolyGram.) In his memoirs, John Culshaw recorded the missed opportunities of Lewis's later years, when his entrepreneurial flair and his instincts for the market had been overtaken by a cautious conservatism.

Lewis gave large sums of money to Rugby School and the Middlesex Hospital. He was uninterested in high living, despite his large personal fortune. He bought Bridge House Farm in Felsted as their weekend holiday home. His first wife died in 1968, and in 1973 he married Jeanie Margaret Smith. He died of cancer at his London house, in Chelsea, on 29 January 1980 at the age of 79.

== Notes and references ==
Notes

== Sources ==
- Culshaw, John (1967). Ring Resounding. London: Secker & Warburg. ISBN 0-436-11800-9.
- Culshaw, John (1981). Putting the Record Straight. London: Secker & Warburg. ISBN 0-436-11802-5.
- Talevsky, Nick (2010). Rock Obituaries – Knocking on Heaven's Door. London: Omnibus. ISBN 978-0857121172.
