= The Emperor Waltz (album) =

The Emperor Waltz: Selections from Paramount’s Technicolor Picture

Studio album by Bing Crosby
- Released: Original 78 album: 1948
- Recorded: January / March 1947
- Genre: Popular
- Length: 11:52
- Label: Decca Records

Bing Crosby chronology
Selections from Showboat (1947)	The Emperor Waltz: Selections from Paramount’s Technicolor Picture (1948)	St. Valentine's Day (1948)

The Emperor Waltz is the eighth solo studio album by American singer and actor Bing Crosby, released in 1948 as a Phonograph record of songs featured in his film The Emperor Waltz.

== Background ==
This was not a soundtrack recording as Crosby recorded the songs separately some months after completing the film in September 1946. A song called "Get Yourself a Phonograph" had been recorded for the film but was eventually omitted. Crosby had previously recorded "I Kiss Your Hand, Madame" on May 24, 1929 with a trio giving support but this time he has the benefit of a full orchestral backing. The song "The Kiss in Your Eyes" was adapted from a slow waltz called "Im Chambre séparée" ("Separate Rooms") written by Richard Heuberger. "Friendly Mountains" was arranged by Joseph J. Lilley based on original Swiss airs and the music for "Emperor Waltz" was written by Johann Strauss the younger in 1888. Johnny Burke wrote the lyrics for the last three mentioned tunes.

== Reception ==
The album reached the No. 2 spot in the Billboard best-selling popular record albums chart on August 7, 1948. It was 9th in the year's top-selling popular record albums listing.

== Track listing ==
These songs were featured on a 2-disc, 78 rpm album set, Decca Album No. A-620.

The Emperor Waltz (album) track listing
Side / Title	Writer(s)	Recording date	Performed with	Time
Disc 1 (24204):
A. "Friendly Mountains"	Johnny Burke	March 17, 1947	Victor Young and His Orchestra	3:04
B. "The Kiss in Your Eyes"	Richard Heuberger, Johnny Burke	January 17, 1947	Victor Young and His Orchestra	3:01
Disc 2 (24170):
A. "I Kiss Your Hand, Madame"	Sam M. Lewis, Joe Young, Ralph Erwin	January 17, 1947	Victor Young and His Orchestra	3:09
B. "Emperor Waltz"	Johann Strauss, Johnny Burke	March 17, 1947	Victor Young and His Orchestra	2:38

== LP releases ==
The songs from A-620 were included in the 10" vinyl LP Top o' the Morning / Emperor Waltz issued by Decca Records in 1950 with catalog No. DL 5272. In 1962, the songs were also included in the Decca 12" LP But Beautiful (DL 4260) in the 15 part Bing's Hollywood series.
