= Peter Martland =

British historian

Peter Martland (born July 1947) is a historian at Corpus Christi College, Cambridge. He began studying at Corpus Christi College in 1982, receiving an MA and PhD in history before becoming a fellow of the college after completion of his PhD in 1992. He is a specialist in the history of the music industry, and in British and American intelligence history. He was one of the researchers for the official history of Britain's domestic intelligence service, MI5, which was published in 2009 by Christopher Andrew as In defence of the realm: The authorised history of the British Security Service (London, 2009).

In December 2016, the Financial Times stated that, along with Sir Richard Dearlove, Martland had quit the Cambridge Intelligence Seminar after concerns that it might be under infiltration by the KGB.

== Selected publications ==
- Since Records Began: EMI – the first 100 years. London, 1997.
- The Future of the Past. London, 2002.
- Corpus Lives. Cambridge, 2003.
- Lord Haw Haw: the English voice of Nazi Germany. London, 2003.
- Footprints on the sands of time. California, 2005.
- Recording history: the British record industry, 1888–1931. Lanham, 2013.
