= Jack Kapp =

Record company executive (1901–1949)

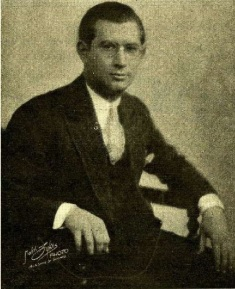
- Kapp, c. 1926–28
- Born: Jacob Kaplitzky; June 15, 1901; Chicago, Illinois, U.S.
- Died: March 25, 1949 (aged 47); New York City, U.S.
- Occupation: Record company executive
- Employer: Brunswick Records
- Known for: Co-founder of Decca Records
- Spouse: Frieda Lutz (m. 1922)

Jack Kapp (born Jacob Kaplitzky; June 15, 1901 – March 25, 1949) was a record company executive with Brunswick Records who founded the American Decca Records in 1934 along with the British Decca founder Edward Lewis, and later the American Decca head Milton Rackmil. Kapp oversaw Bing Crosby's rise to success as a recording artist in the early 1930s, and, four decades later, Crosby still gave appreciation to Kapp for diversifying his song catalogue into various styles and genres, saying, "I thought he was crazy, but I just did what he told me." Kapp could not read or sing music, but to his talent, he stressed the credo, "Where's the melody?"

== Biography ==
Kapp was born in Chicago, Illinois, to a Jewish family of immigrants from Russia. His father, Myer Kaplitzky, was a distributor for Columbia Records in 1905 and the founder of the Imperial Talking Machine Shop in Chicago. Kapp worked at the store after high school and was known for having memorized the catalog numbers of every record in the inventory as well as the addresses and phone numbers of his father's best customers. After marrying his childhood sweetheart, Frieda Lutz, in 1922, he opened the Kapp Record Store with his younger brother, Dave Kapp. In 1926, Kapp joined Brunswick Records and was put in charge of their "race" label (Brunswick 7000 and Vocalion Records 1000 series), where he scouted, signed, or produced artists including, King Oliver, Jelly Roll Morton, Pinetop Smith, Leroy Carr, Frankie Jaxon, and Cow Cow Davenport, among others.

Kapp also worked with artists on the Brunswick label; it was over the company's objection that he had Al Jolson record "Sonny Boy", which became a huge success for Jolson. The artists signed by Kapp included Bing Crosby, Cab Calloway, the Mills Brothers, the Boswell Sisters, and Mildred Bailey. Kapp sold Brunswick's British franchises to stockbroker Edward R. Lewis, who owned the English Decca Company. Two years later, when a deal to buy Columbia Records fell through, the pair instead started Decca Records. Crosby's deal with Brunswick had an escape clause that allowed him to follow Kapp to the new company. Other artists followed, including the Mills Brothers, the Boswell Sisters, Earl Hines, Ted Lewis, Isham Jones and the Dorsey Brothers. Kapp also signed new performers such as Chick Webb, Art Tatum, Jimmie Lunceford, Ethel Waters, and a year after the company's founding, Louis Armstrong. Dave Kapp was instrumental in building the company's extensive hillbilly catalogue, allowing Decca to corner the market on country music for years.

Record sales had plunged during the Great Depression, and Kapp decided that Decca discs would sell for 50 cents instead of the usual 75 cents to a dollar. When Brunswick shifted its back catalogue to a 25-cent subsidiary label in an effort to sink the fledgling company, Kapp further reduced the price to 35 cents per disc. Crucially, he also pursued the then-new jukebox market. In 1938, Decca began releasing record sleeves with cover artwork; other innovations such as liner notes and Broadway cast albums followed (although Kapp pioneered this practice in 1933 by recording the entire Blackbirds of 1928 and Show Boat scores and issuing them in album sets). By 1939, the company was on its feet; 18 million of the 50 million records sold in the U.S. that year were issued by Decca.

Jack Kapp died due to a cerebral hemorrhage in 1949, aged 47, in New York City. After his death, his brother, Dave Kapp, took over American Decca. Dave Kapp later founded Kapp Records, based in New York.
