= John Scott Trotter =

American arranger, composer and orchestra leader (1908–1975)

- Born: John Scott Trotter Jr. June 14, 1908; Charlotte, North Carolina, U.S.
- Died: October 29, 1975 (aged 67) Los Angeles, California, U.S.
- Genres: Classical music, big band
- Occupations: Arranger, composer, orchestra leader
- Years active: 1925–1975

John Scott Trotter Jr. (June 14, 1908 – October 29, 1975), also known as "Uncle John", was an American arranger, composer and orchestra leader.

Trotter was best known for conducting the John Scott Trotter Orchestra which backed singer and entertainer Bing Crosby on record and on his radio programs from 1937 to 1954. He also worked with Vince Guaraldi on the score for Peanuts animated television specials and feature films between 1966 and 1975.

== Early life ==
Trotter was born John Scott Trotter, Jr. on June 14, 1908, in Charlotte, North Carolina. He was born to parents John Scott Trotter and Lelia Trotter (née Bias).

Trotter attended local schools in Charlotte. He studied piano under Ida Moore Alexander. In 1925, Trotter entered the University of North Carolina, where he began his career as a professional musician playing piano for a college band led by Hal Kemp. Kemp had entered the university in 1922 and graduated in 1926. Trotter withdrew near the end of his first year to join Kemp's band as pianist and arranger, a position he held until 1936.

== Career ==
After leaving Kemp's band, Trotter did some work in Hollywood where he handled the orchestrations for Columbia Pictures Pennies from Heaven which was his first work with Bing Crosby. This would start a 17-year professional association with Crosby, although Trotter and Crosby had first met in 1930 in New York City at the Manger Hotel while Crosby was working with Paul Whiteman's orchestra.

Trotter recalled the background to his involvement with Pennies from Heaven in an interview with Canadian broadcaster Gord Atkinson. He had been asked by Johnny Burke if he wanted to do the orchestrations for the film. This was one of the first independent film productions. Crosby was then under contract to Paramount but Pennies from Heaven was done at Columbia as an independent and nobody was set to do the music. Trotter told Burke that he hadn't come out to work and that seemed to be that. A week later, Burke asked, 'Would you help Arthur Johnston with the piano parts?' After much persuasion, Trotter helped Johnston with the piano parts and fell in love with the score which included Pennies from Heaven, So Do I, and One, Two, Button Your Shoe, and also the Skeleton in the Closet. He then decided to complete the orchestrations as the offer was still open. Trotter recalled that the day Pennies from Heaven was recorded, the cameras were rolling with the orchestra on stage; it was not prerecorded as would be usual today. John Scott Trotter considered that Crosby was a past master of lip syncing but it wasn't done in those days. After completing Pennies from Heaven Trotter went back east."

In July 1937, Trotter replaced Jimmy Dorsey as the musical director for Crosby on NBC's radio program Kraft Music Hall. That same year, Trotter began arranging and conducting songs for Crosby's records for Decca. Their first recording together, It's the Natural Thing to Do, reached the No. 2 spot in the charts of the day and they had many hits over the ensuing years. Trotter would remain Crosby's musical director until 1954.

The involvement with the Kraft Music Hall came about when Larry Crosby, Bing's brother and public relations director, sent Trotter a wire asking if he could be in Hollywood on June 28, 1937 to take over the orchestra of the Kraft Music Hall on July 8. Although Trotter had rehearsed and directed orchestras, he had never had an orchestra of his own, with his own name. The first time he appeared under his own name 'John Scott Trotter and his Orchestra' was on the Kraft Music Hall with Bing Crosby. The Kraft Music Hall went fifty weeks a year and Trotter did one hundred and forty consecutive Thursdays without missing one.

Bing Crosby talked very warmly about Trotter in his 1953 autobiography Call Me Lucky and commented about Trotter's remarkable self-control.

Trotter also had orchestra related responsibilities. Jerry Colonna was a trombonist for the band and future entertainer Spike Jones served as a drummer.

Trotter moved on to television, becoming musical director for The George Gobel Show from 1954 to 60. He served as musical director of several of Crosby's television specials as well as his 1964-65 ABC situation comedy, The Bing Crosby Show.

=== Peanuts ===
Beginning with It's the Great Pumpkin, Charlie Brown in 1966, Trotter arranged and directed music scores for 11 Peanuts television specials and one feature film in conjunction with composer Vince Guaraldi. His final work, You're a Good Sport, Charlie Brown, was broadcast on October 28, 1975—one day before his death. Trotter was nominated for an Oscar award and a Grammy Award for his musical score for the 1969 feature film, A Boy Named Charlie Brown.

== Death ==
Trotter died of cancer on October 29, 1975, at Cedars-Sinai Medical Center in Los Angeles, California. He was buried in Sharon Memorial Park in Charlotte. Surviving him were a sister, Margaret Kinghorn, and two brothers, William and Robert Trotter.

== Legacy and criticism ==
Carroll Carroll, who was the chief writer of Kraft Music Hall, recalled Trotter's massive volume and appetite when it came to his everyday life;

Trotter, a monolith of a man, stood astride pop and 'long hair' music, as it was then called, like a colossus, and occasionally flew from Hollywood to New Orleans for the weekend (something not done often in the thirties) just to cater to his gourmet tastes with a decent plate of oysters Rockefeller. During the war, when food writer M. F. K. Fisher was a guest on the show to plug her wartime conservation cookbook, How to Cook a Wolf, she told Bing that her book explained how to use leftovers. The heartily-fed Trotter stepped to the mike and, in his most polite and gentle North Carolina drawl, asked, 'Pardon me, ma'am, but what are left-overs?

Trotter, along with Jack Kapp, has been criticized for mainstreaming Crosby's style away from his jazz roots. The reality is that Crosby himself chose the songs he performed on his radio shows and had ultimate approval for anything he recorded to disc. Crosby could have worked with any musical arranger he chose, but he preferred working with Trotter for 17 years. Crosby once said of Trotter;

I'm not musically educated enough to really describe what he was in music terms. I just knew he was very good and he had marvelous taste.
