= Decca Records =

British record label

- Parent company: Universal Music Group (1999–present); Previously; UK: PolyGram (1980–1998); US: MCA (1962-1972)
- Founded: 7 February 1929; 97 years ago
- Founder: Edward Lewis
- Distributors: Decca Music Group (UK); Verve Label Group (US); Universal Music Group (International)
- Genre: Various
- Country of origin: United Kingdom
- Location: Kensington, London, United Kingdom
- Official website: Decca Records

Decca Records is a British-American record label established in 1929 by Edward Lewis after his acquisition of a gramophone manufacturer, The Decca Gramophone Company. It set up an American subsidiary under the Decca name, which became an independent company just before the Second World War. The American spin-off became a subsidiary of MCA Inc. in 1962. Known for its technical innovations, the British parent company grew to become the second most successful recording company in Britain and celebrated fifty years of existence in 1979, shortly before being sold to PolyGram. Both Decca and its former subsidiary were subsequently acquired by Universal Music.

Decca and its American spin-off both built up strong catalogues of popular music. In their first two decades, their artists included Gertrude Lawrence, George Formby, Jack Hylton and Vera Lynn in Britain and Bing Crosby, Al Jolson, the Andrews Sisters and the Mills Brothers in the US. Later performers in their popular catalogues included in the US Bill Haley & His Comets and Buddy Holly plus in the UK Elvis Presley (licensed from RCA Records), Tommy Steele, Lonnie Donegan, Chuck Berry (licensed from Chess Records), Johnny Cash (licensed from Sun Records), Eddie Cochran (licensed from Liberty Records), and the Rolling Stones.

In the classical sphere, Decca became a major player after the Second World War, building up a large catalogue of symphonic, operatic, chamber and other music. Between 1958 and 1965 the company made what has been widely described as the gramophone's greatest achievement – the first complete recording to be released of Wagner's operatic tetralogy, Der Ring des Nibelungen (The Ring of the Nibelung). Decca's advanced technological expertise offered recorded sound of unprecedented realism in the mid-20th century, and it was an early adopter of digital technology.

== History ==
=== Foundation ===
1914 advertisement for Decca Dulcephone

The origins of the Decca Record Company were not in making records but in making the gramophones on which to play them. Shortly before the First World War the first Decca product was offered to the public: the "Decca Dulcephone" a portable gramophone, retailing at two guineas (£2.10 in decimal currency, and equivalent to about £250 in 2023 terms). It was manufactured by the musical instrument makers Barnett Samuel and Sons Ltd, a company founded in 1869. There are various theories about the derivation of the name "Decca", but the musicologist Robert Dearling describes it as "a word whose origins are lost".

In the 1920s the company changed its name to "The Decca Gramophone Company" and it was floated on the stock market in 1928. Edward Lewis, a London stockbroker, acted for the company, despite his reservations about its business model:

A company manufacturing gramophones but not records was rather like one making razors but not the consumable blades ... I was not particularly excited at the prospect, for having seen the tremendous activity and great rise in the shares of Columbia Graphophones and the Gramophone Company, based on the boom in records, I felt that whilst the gramophone was a dull affair marketwise, records were like magic on the Stock Exchange.

Lewis tried to convince Decca's board that the way forward was to expand into record production and manufacture, and recommended buying out the struggling Duophone Record Company in south London, arguing that "with the well-known Decca trademark and ... distributing organization ... a Decca record would surely succeed where others were failing". The Decca directors were unpersuaded and Lewis raised enough capital to acquire not only Duophone but Decca itself.

On 7 February 1929 the Decca Record Company's first discs were recorded: dance music performed by Ambrose and the May Fair Orchestra. The first classical recording took place four days later at the Chenil Galleries in Chelsea, and featured the violist Cecil Bonvallot in an arrangement of J. S. Bach's Komm, süßer Tod. Among the fledgling company's releases in its first year were a set of numbers from William Walton and Edith Sitwell's Façade conducted by the composer and recited by Sitwell and Constant Lambert, and a set of Handel Concerti grossi conducted by Ernest Ansermet, who made more than a hundred recordings for Decca between then and 1968. A premiere recording of Delius's Sea Drift conducted by Julian Clifford was in less than ideal sound, but marked Decca's first association with the baritone Roy Henderson which lasted for the rest of his career.

=== 1930s ===
The Great Depression of the 1930s hit Decca hard. Lewis, although he remained nominally merely a board member, effectively took over the direction of the company and at his instigation Decca made substantial cuts in the prices of its records. In 1930, Decca acquired the British rights to the German Polydor label, gaining access to a wide range of classical recordings. During the decade Decca also bought the British rights to the Fonit and Ultraphon catalogues, but sold its French subsidiary to Edison Bell. Decca bought a majority shareholding in the American Brunswick Record Company from the Warner Brothers film studios; its catalogue contained recordings by leading popular artists such as Bing Crosby, Guy Lombardo and Al Jolson. Decca established an American subsidiary, Decca Records US, in 1934, funded and chaired by Lewis and led by Jack Kapp, Milton Rackmil and E. F. Stevens. American Decca boosted its presence in the popular market by signing the Andrews Sisters and the Mills Brothers. As the Second World War loomed, Lewis, foreseeing a freeze of his overseas assets, sold his holdings in the US company.

In 1934 Jack Kapp established a country & western line for the new Decca American subsidiary by signing Frank Luther, Sons of the Pioneers, Stuart Hamblen, The Ranch Boys, and other popular acts based in both New York and Los Angeles. Louisiana singer/composer Jimmie Davis began recording for Decca the same year, joined by western vocalists Jimmy Wakely and Roy Rogers in 1940.

In 1935, the Compo Company became the Canadian distributor of American Decca recordings.

Between 1929 and 1938, record sales in Britain fell by eighty-five per cent, and Lewis sought new ways of keeping Decca afloat. He signed popular artists such as the singers Gertrude Lawrence and George Formby, the best-selling dance-band leader Jack Hylton and the singer Vera Lynn, who later became the first non-American singer to top the Billboard charts. In 1935, Decca made the first recording of Walton's First Symphony and in the same year lured Sir Henry Wood away from EMI, although he later returned there. Other classical artists recruited by the company included the newly formed Boyd Neel Orchestra in 1934, followed by the Griller Quartet in 1935 and Clifford Curzon in 1937. Lewis's biographer Peter Martland writes that "through a combination of Lewis's adroitness, good luck, and a gradual upturn in the global economy, by the time the Second World War broke out in 1939, it appeared that Decca had weathered the storm".

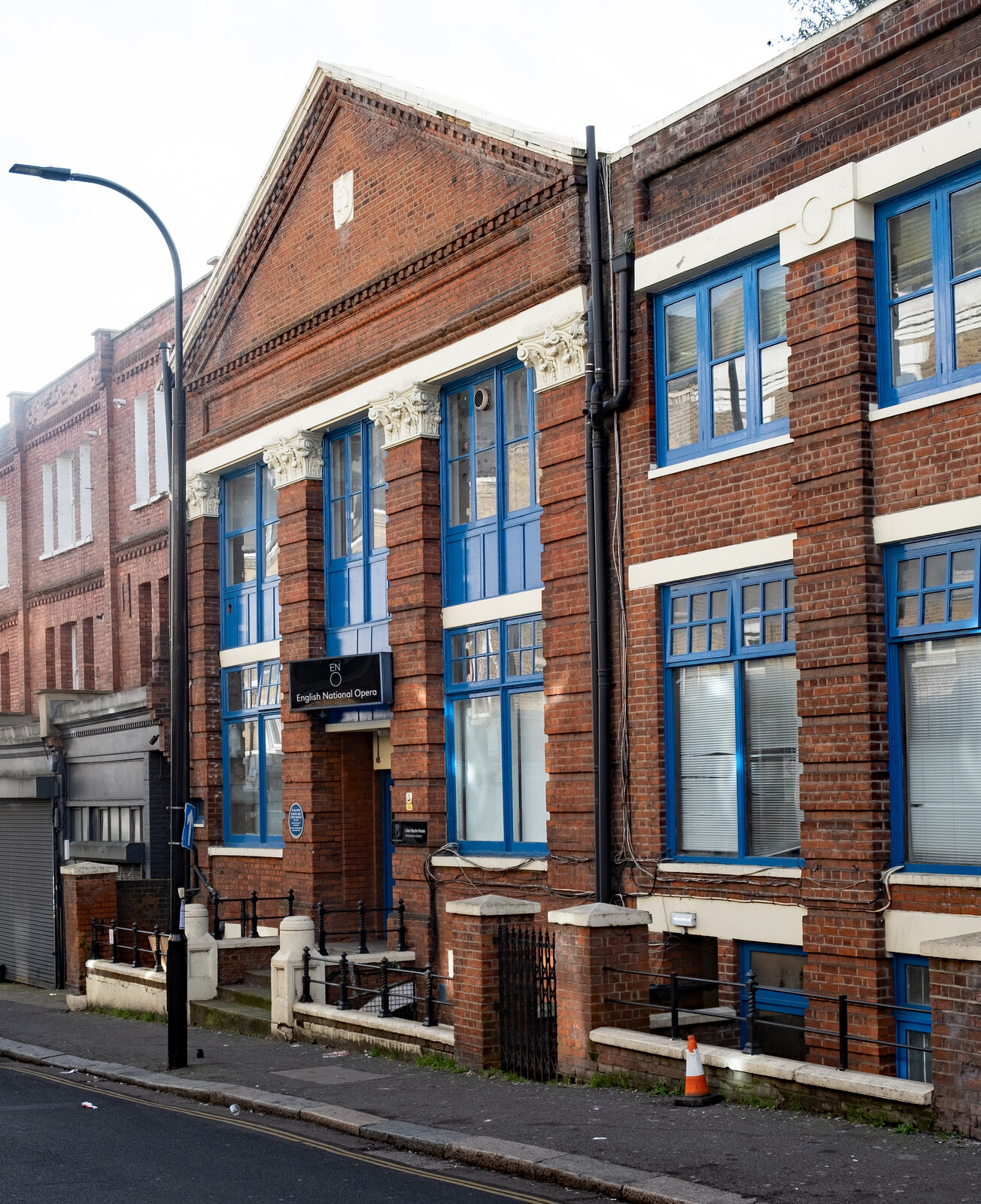
Decca Studios, London (now Lilian Baylis House)

=== Second World War ===
Decca had acquired the small Crystalate record company in the late 1930s, and with it its sound engineers Arthur Haddy and Kenneth Wilkinson, as well as its studios in West Hampstead. Recording continued at the studios throughout the Second World War. Although production was hampered by a shortage of the shellac from which records were made, (Note: Decca got around restrictions on shellac supplies by offering customers a discount on new purchases if they returned unwanted old records, which could then be recycled.) for Decca the positive results of the war far outweighed the disadvantages. Haddy and his team were moved from making commercial recordings to developing vital technology for the war effort. They were tasked with making recording equipment to detect the sonic differences in the water movement around German and British submarine propellers. As the relevant differences were at the high end of the frequency range, unprecedently sensitive equipment had to be invented, and this the Decca engineers did. This was not only an important contribution to the war effort, but made possible greatly enhanced gramophone recordings when the war ended. "We'd got the goods", Haddy later recalled.

The American offshoot of Decca was less affected by the war than the British company. It bought out Warner Brothers' residual stake in Brunswick and floated as an independent company on the New York Stock Exchange in 1942. The company's popular music catalogue now included recordings by, among others, the Ink Spots, Jimmy Dorsey, Judy Garland, Count Basie, Louis Armstrong and Ella Fitzgerald. In 1942, the company released the first recording of "White Christmas" by Bing Crosby. He recorded another version of the song in 1947, also for US Decca; it became and has remained the world's best-selling single. American Decca pioneered original cast albums of musicals with the Broadway cast of Oklahoma! in 1943, and other shows followed, including Carousel, Annie Get Your Gun, Guys and Dolls and The King and I.

=== Post-war ===
Decca's ffrr logo

On 8 June 1945 Decca announced that its ffrr (full frequency range recording) system had been "in daily use for the past twelve months". The company's publicity manager, Francis Attwood, suggested a new trademark consisting of the letters "ffrr" coming out of a human ear. This was adopted and Lewis later observed that Attwood's design was "to become of immense value". The dramatically enhanced frequency range now possible prompted Decca to move its main London recording venue from the West Hampstead studios to the acoustically superb Kingsway Hall in 1944. Ansermet conducted what Dearling calls "the first important ffrr release", Stravinsky's Petrushka, recorded there in February 1946.

Another technical advance that greatly benefited Decca was the invention of the long-playing record (LP), pressed on vinyl rather than shellac and playing for five times longer than 78 r.p.m. discs. The technology was pioneered in the US by Columbia Records, and in Europe by Decca. From 1948 to 1950, Decca concentrated its efforts on exporting LPs for the American market, and it was not until June 1950 that Decca LPs became available in Britain. The playing time of LP made recordings of complete operas considerably more viable than hitherto, and Decca recorded Mozart's Die Entführung aus dem Serail (The Seraglio) in Vienna in June 1950 and Wagner's four-and-a-half-hour Die Meistersinger (The Mastersingers) in 1951–52. Decca's main British rival, EMI, comprising the Columbia, His Master's Voice and Parlophone labels, lagged behind, having initially reached the conclusion that there was no future in LP, devoting itself instead to an unsuccessful two-year attempt to perpetuate the 78 format.

Most recording contracts had expired or lapsed during the war, and consequently many eminent artists, previously exclusive to rival labels, could be enticed by Decca's technical edge. The company instituted an ambitious programme of international classical recordings in many European centres, building up an artist roster comparable with those of its pre-war competitors. For the first time since the 1930s, Decca was able to resume full-price releases. A mainstay of the orchestral catalogue was provided by Ansermet and his Suisse Romande Orchestra in Geneva, who recorded for Decca from 1949 to 1968. Peter Pears signed with the company in 1944, Kathleen Ferrier in 1946, Julius Katchen in 1947 and the D'Oyly Carte Opera Company – hitherto exclusive to EMI – in 1949. In 1950, the Vienna Philharmonic, also contracted to EMI until then, entered into an exclusive contract with Decca. Other former EMI artists who joined Decca were Wilhelm Backhaus and Wilhelm Kempff.

From the late 1940s onward the American Decca had a sizeable roster of country artists. The main architect of American Decca's success in country music was Owen Bradley, who joined American Decca in 1947, and was later promoted to vice president and head of A&R for the Nashville operations in 1958.

In 1947, Lewis, finding the now independent US Decca uncooperative in distributing British recordings, set up a new American subsidiary, London Records.

=== 1950s ===
Despite having the Vienna Philharmonic under contract, Decca began the decade at a disadvantage to EMI so far as orchestral recordings were concerned. On the His Master's Voice label EMI had Sir Thomas Beecham's Royal Philharmonic and on Columbia Walter Legge's Philharmonia. The London orchestras available to Decca were the London Symphony Orchestra and London Philharmonic Orchestra (LPO), described by Decca's discographer Philip Stuart as "in rather run-down condition in the post-war years". Among the Decca recordings with the LPO is a cycle of Vaughan Williams's symphonies, conducted by Sir Adrian Boult in the presence of the composer between 1952 and 1956. (Note: The Decca cycle comprised all eight Vaughan Williams symphonies to date; his Ninth and last was premiered in 1958 and recorded by Boult and the LPO for Everest Records.) The Vienna Philharmonic recording of Die Entführung aus dem Serail conducted by Josef Krips with singers from the Vienna State Opera was the first of a long series of opera recordings.

After I had heard music in stereo for the first time, I did not need to be convinced of its potential: quite apart from its purely directional qualities there was a sense of spaciousness never before heard in recorded sound, and the creative opportunities it offered – especially in opera – seemed unlimited.

— John Culshaw, producer of the Decca Ring

Stereophony – a system for recording and reproducing sound using separate microphones feeding separate loudspeakers in playback to give a spatial effect – had been known for many years and had been used in the cinema from the 1930s. (Note: According to the Cambridge Companion to Film Music, in film sound reproduction the term "stereo" has usually differed from the two-channel stereophony used in audio hi-fi (the Greek root stereos (στερεός) actually means "solid" or "firm") and normally indicates a minimum of three channels. An early example of film stereo is in Disney's 1940 Fantasia.) When the prospect emerged in the mid-1950s that domestic equipment could be manufactured to reproduce stereophonic recordings, Decca began recording in stereo, first in Geneva on 13 May 1954, experimentally in London from December 1954, and in Vienna from April 1955. Decca's first stereo recording, produced by James Walker, was Rimsky-Korsakov's Antar symphonic suite.

The producer John Culshaw was a strong advocate of stereophony, but not all his Decca colleagues agreed. Launching stereophonic recordings only five or so years after the introduction of LPs would require considerable fresh outlay by record producers and purchasers alike: the former needing to re-record all their back catalogues and the latter to buy new playback equipment. It was not until 1958 that Decca began issuing stereo recordings, both in Britain and in the US.

In popular music American Decca assembled a substantial list of performers in the 1950s, including Bill Haley & His Comets – whose 1954 "Rock Around The Clock" was a big success, and Buddy Holly. British Decca had Tommy Steele and Lonnie Donegan. British Decca also licensed from independent record companies Chuck Berry, Johnny Cash, Eddie Cochran and Jerry Lee Lewis which were issued in the UK on the London label. In June and July 1957 American Decca released the soundtracks from Hecht-Hill-Lancaster Productions' film Sweet Smell of Success, which, exceptionally, had two separate soundtracks, each featuring completely different music. (Note: The first soundtrack LP featured the jazz score composed by Elmer Bernstein; the second soundtrack LP featured music composed and performed by the Chico Hamilton Quintet, a band that appears in the film.) The acts from American Decca and its Coral Records subsidiary were issued by British Decca on Brunswick Records and Coral. British Decca also issued licensed American records on the London label.

Beginning in 1951 the independent American Decca, led by Rackmil, bought shares in Universal Pictures, holding a controlling interest by 1954. The two companies merged with MCA in 1959. The American RCA label severed its long affiliation with EMI in 1957, and entered into an alliance with Decca, which took over the British marketing and distribution of RCA recordings, including top selling popular recordings by artists including Elvis Presley. An agreement between the two companies allowed artists exclusive to one label to record for the other, and Decca producers and engineers made nearly 200 recordings in Europe to be sold under the RCA label. Artists thus recorded included Pierre Monteux, Arthur Rubinstein, Leopold Stokowski, Jascha Heifetz, Joan Sutherland, Birgit Nilsson and André Previn. Decca production teams also worked on recording sessions for the company's subsidiary but largely autonomous labels Argo and, later, Oiseau-Lyre.

Also in 1951 American Decca bought its Canadian distributor the Compo Company.

1958 saw Decca embarking on what has been described in three continents as the greatest recording ever made: Wagner's Der Ring des Nibelungen (The Nibelung's Ring). (Note: In polls for Gramophone (1999) and BBC Music Magazine (2012) the Decca Ring was voted "the greatest recording of all time", and the phrase has been echoed by writers in the US and Australia.) The recording was conceived and produced by Culshaw, who engaged the Vienna Philharmonic, the conductor Georg Solti and leading Wagner singers including Birgit Nilsson, Wolfgang Windgassen, Hans Hotter and Gottlob Frick and, in roles they did not play onstage, well-known singers such as Kirsten Flagstad, Dietrich Fischer-Dieskau and Joan Sutherland. Culshaw and his engineering colleagues set out to capture on disc performances that would recreate in listeners' minds the drama that Wagner intended, compensating for the lack of visual images with imaginative production, making use of the newly available stereophonic technology.

American Decca actively re-entered the classical music field in 1950 with distribution deals from Deutsche Grammophon and Parlophone. American Decca began issuing its classical music recordings in 1956 when Israel Horowitz joined Decca to head its classical music operations. To further American Decca's dedication to serious music, in August 1950, Rackmill announced the release of a new series of disks to be known as the "Decca Gold Label Series" which was to be devoted to "symphonies, concertos, chamber music, opera, songs and choral music." American and European artists were to be the performers. Among the classical recordings released on Decca's "Gold Label" series were albums by Leroy Anderson, the Cincinnati Symphony Orchestra conducted by Max Rudolf and guitarist Andrés Segovia.

=== 1960s ===
In the 1960s Decca consolidated its position as the only British record company to rival EMI. By the end of the decade Decca had 22.8 per cent of the British LP market, second only to EMI, which had 26.5 per cent. Technically it surpassed its competitor – in 1965 The Times commented that Decca's engineers were incomparable – and it had expanded its overseas operations to include not only the completion of the Ring cycle but extensive repertoire from Karl Münchinger and the Stuttgart Chamber Orchestra in baroque music, Solti and Tullio Serafin in Italian operas with the Santa Cecilia Academy Chorus and Orchestra, Sutherland in the bel canto repertoire, and the Vienna Philharmonic in operatic and purely orchestral works with Herbert von Karajan and in a Beethoven cycle conducted by Hans Schmidt-Isserstedt. Luciano Pavarotti made his first recordings in 1964. Legge's Philharmonia became the self-governing New Philharmonia in the same year, and made more than 70 Decca recordings, with conductors including Benjamin Britten, Stokowski, Carlo Maria Giulini and Claudio Abbado. Britten, both as pianist and conductor, maintained a long association with Decca, recording most of his major works as well as those of other composers. Culshaw left the company in 1967 to become head of music for BBC Television, but Decca had a team of experienced producers to replace him, including Erik Smith, Christopher Raeburn and James Mallinson.

In 1962 MCA completed its acquisition of Decca Records Inc. with American Decca stock exchanged for MCA stock to American Decca stockholders.

British Decca are remembered by music critics, as well as in popular culture, as having rejected the Beatles in 1962. While it is repeated that the Decca executive Dick Rowe told the group's manager that "guitar groups are on the way out", the Beatles in fact auditioned for Rowe's assistant, Mike Smith, who – as his opposite numbers at His Master's Voice and Columbia had already done – turned the group down. The Beatles were later taken up by George Martin of the small Parlophone branch of EMI. Decca did not repeat the mistake with the Rolling Stones, whom the company signed up in 1963.

In 1966, Decca set up a "progressive" subsidiary, Deram Records, which became home to bands such as the Moody Blues, whose Days of Future Passed became one of the best-selling albums of its time. Others recording for Deram in the 1960s were Amen Corner, Chicken Shack and Ten Years After. Previously, British Decca had also blocked the release of Ray Peterson's "Tell Laura I Love Her" in 1960, Decca lost an important source of American recordings when Atlantic Records switched British distribution to Polydor Records in 1966, so that Atlantic could gain access to a greater number of British artists.

In 1966 the American entity Decca Records Inc. was dissolved, and from that point on, Decca Records was a division of MCA Inc. In 1968 American Decca parent MCA founded MCA Records in the UK, which took over the handling of American Decca material as well as MCA's sister labels Kapp Records and Uni Records.

In 1969 Decca Records released the debut album of British progressive rock band Genesis, From Genesis to Revelation.

=== 1970s ===
In 1970 American Decca's Canadian subsidiary the Compo Company was reorganized into MCA Records (Canada).

British Decca's fortunes declined during the 1970s. Lewis and his principal associate Maurice Rosengarten were growing old and less interested in new talent. Culshaw cited as an example Rosengarten's opposition in the previous decade to the signing of Pavarotti because it might upset the ageing tenor Mario del Monaco, who had been recording for British Decca since 1952. The producer Hugh Mendl had attempted at the end of the 1960s to convince Lewis that the company needed some modernisation of its structure and practices, but Lewis thought Mendl's ideas revolutionary and nothing was done.

Despite what Culshaw dubbed the hardening of British Decca's arteries, on the classical side the company launched two new labels in 1974. James Mallinson's "Headline" series was devoted to contemporary music and during the rest of the 1970s issued recordings of works by, among others, Berio, Birtwistle, Cage, Henze, Ligeti, Maxwell Davies, Takemitsu and Xenakis. The "Florilegium" label was dedicated to early music, in competition with Archiv and Das Alte Werk. The company continued to lead the field in recording technology. In the US and Europe companies had been experimenting with digital recording for some years. In the US the small company Telarc made the first commercial digital recordings in 1978. In the same year Decca developed its own digital recorders for recording, mixing, editing, and mastering albums. The company's first digital recording was made in Vienna in December 1978: the Vienna Philharmonic, conducted by Christoph von Dohnányi in Mendelssohn's Italian Symphony. During 1979, the new system was used in Tel Aviv from March, the US from April, London from June, and Geneva from December. It superseded analogue in the US by late 1979, and elsewhere by mid-1981. In May 1979, Decca made the world's first digital recording of an opera, Fidelio, conducted by Solti with his Chicago forces.

In the 1970s British Decca's popular catalogue had fewer substantial additions than previously. The Rolling Stones left to set up their own label in 1971 and the Moody Blues were the only international rock act that continued to record for Decca. Among the company's major commercial successes of the decade was Dana's two-million selling single, "All Kinds of Everything", issued on British Decca's subsidiary label Rex Records. New recordings by artists familiar from the previous decade, including the Bachelors, Val Doonican, and Engelbert Humperdinck, continued to sell well.

In his memoirs Culshaw wrote of "an era of decline", and lamented the missed opportunities of Lewis's later years, when his entrepreneurial flair and his instincts for the market had been overtaken by a cautious conservatism. In the Oxford Dictionary of National Biography, Peter Martland writes of Lewis: "Like many who create, build, and retain close personal control over large enterprises, Lewis was unable to appoint a successor or relinquish control of the business. As a consequence, in 1980, days before his death, the business, then in the grip of a serious financial crisis, was sold". Decca was bought by the German-Dutch conglomerate PolyGram. The Decca pressing plant in New Malden, the studios in West Hampstead and Decca's headquarters in central London were all closed down.

In 1971 MCA established MCA Records in the United States, combining American Decca, Kapp and Uni Records with the three labels maintaining their identities. American Decca also shut down its classical music department in 1971.

In 1973 MCA Records consolidated its three American labels, Decca, Kapp and Uni and were absorbed into the MCA label. They hired veteran US Decca producer Milt Gabler to supervise the reissue of albums originally issued on the three labels on the MCA label.

=== 1980 onwards ===
1980s logo and current Decca Classics logo

After being absorbed by PolyGram British Decca continued as a separate label. It concentrated chiefly on the classical and crossover repertoires. During the 1980s there was some activity in popular music, with hits from Bananarama, Bronski Beat, the Communards and Fine Young Cannibals, but as a classical label British Decca was a stronger presence, making numerous records with Solti in Chicago, the Montreal Symphony Orchestra conducted by Charles Dutoit, the Cleveland Orchestra with Riccardo Chailly, Dohnányi, and a long-time British Decca artist Vladimir Ashkenazy, and soloists including Kiri Te Kanawa, Renée Fleming, Pascal Rogé, Joshua Bell, Cecilia Bartoli and Jean-Yves Thibaudet. Among Decca's later classical signings are the cellist Sheku Kanneh-Mason and the pianist Benjamin Grosvenor.

British Decca's prominence in the crossover repertoire dates from 1990 when Pavarotti's recording of the aria "Nessun dorma" from Turandot was used by the BBC to introduce its coverage of the FIFA World Cup. When Decca's recording of the tournament's opening concert performance by Pavarotti, Plácido Domingo and José Carreras was released, it became the biggest-selling classical album of all time. The three tenors' record paved the way for Decca's crossover artists such as Russell Watson, Andrea Bocelli, Katherine Jenkins and Alfie Boe.

In 1994 MCA Nashville revived the Decca label as a country music label.

Both British Decca and American Decca have come under the proprietorship of a single owner. PolyGram, which bought British Decca in 1980, and MCA, which bought American Decca twenty years earlier, merged and became Universal Music Group in 1999. The consolidation combining both American and British Decca under one parent company led to the shutdown of the Decca country music label in the USA and the London Records classical music arm renamed Decca Records in North America in February 1999. The Western classical-music catalogue of Philips Records, also owned by Universal, was merged with British Decca's. Universal also owns Deutsche Grammophon, which remains a separate label within the group and also manages the American Decca classical music catalogue. In 2011 Universal donated 200,000 of its American Decca master recordings from the 1920s to the 1940s to the United States Library of Congress.

In 2017 Universal Music revived the Decca Gold American classical music label under the management of the Verve Label Group.

== See also ==
- Decca Studios, London, England
- Category: Decca Records artists
- Category: Decca Records albums
- Category: Decca Records singles
- List of artists under the Decca Records label
- Lists of record labels
- The Decca audition by the Beatles in 1962
- Point Music
- Decca Broadway
- MCA Records
- List of Decca albums

Selected affiliated labels

- Brunswick Records
- Coral Records
- Deram Records
- Geffen Records
- Threshold Records
- Phase 4 Stereo

== Notes, references and sources ==
=== Sources ===
==== Books ====
- Barfe, Louis (2004). Where Have All the Good Times Gone? – The Rise and Fall of the Record Industry. London: Atlantic Books. ISBN 978-1-84-354065-6.
- Broven, John (11 August 2011). Record Makers and Breakers: Voices of the Independent Rock 'n' Roll Pioneers. University of Illinois Press. ISBN 978-0-252-09401-9.
- Cooper, David (2017). "Pictures That Talk and Sing". In Cooke, Mervyn; Ford, Fiona (eds.). The Cambridge Companion to Film Music. Cambridge: Cambridge University Press. ISBN 978-1-31-614678-1.
- Culshaw, John (1967). Ring Resounding. London: Secker & Warburg. ISBN 0-436-11800-9.
- Culshaw, John (1981). Putting the Record Straight. London: Secker & Warburg. ISBN 0-436-11802-5.
- Dearling, Robert; Dearling, Celia (1984). The Guinness Book of Recorded Sound. Enfield: Guinness Books. ISBN 978-0-85-112274-8.
- Kallen, Stuart (2011). The Beatles. Farmington Hills: Kid Haven Press. ISBN 978-0-73-775868-9.
- Larkin, Colin (1997). The Virgin Encyclopedia of Seventies Music. London: Virgin. ISBN 978-0-75-350154-2.
- Larkin, Colin (2002). The Virgin Encyclopedia of Sixties Music. London: Virgin. ISBN 978-1-85-227933-2.
- Matthews, David (2003). Britten. London: Haus Publishing. ISBN 978-1-9043-4121-5.
- Pettitt, Stephen (1985). Philharmonia Orchestra: A Record of Achievement 1945–1985. London: Robert Hale. ISBN 978-0-7090-2371-5.

==== Web ====
- Stuart, Philip (July 2009). "Decca Classical, 1929–2009" (PDF). CHARM. AHRC Research Centre for the History and Analysis of Recorded Music, King's College, London. Archived from the original (PDF) on 23 September 2024.
