= A Connecticut Yankee in King Arthur's Court (disambiguation) =

A Connecticut Yankee in King Arthur's Court is an 1889 novel by the American author Mark Twain.

A Connecticut Yankee in King Arthur's Court may also refer to:

- A Connecticut Yankee in King Arthur's Court (1921 film), a silent film adaptation of the novel
- A Connecticut Yankee in King Arthur's Court (1949 film), a musical adaptation of the novel starring Bing Crosby
  - A Connecticut Yankee in King Arthur's Court (album), derived from the 1949 film
- A Connecticut Yankee in King Arthur's Court, a 1989 television movie adaptation of the novel starring Keshia Knight Pulliam
- New Adventures of a Yankee in King Arthur's Court, a 1988 Soviet adventure film based on the novel

== See also ==
- A Connecticut Yankee (disambiguation)
