= The Unlighted Road (Schlitz Playhouse of Stars) =

- Schlitz Playhouse of Stars episode
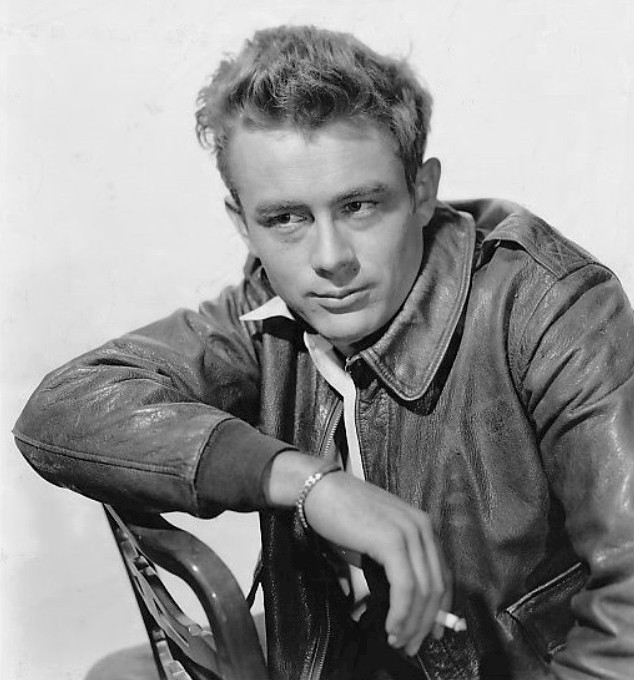
- James Dean in The Unlighted Road
- Episode no.: Season 4 Episode 35
- Directed by: Justus Addiss
- Written by: Walter C. Brown
- Original air date: May 6, 1955

Guest appearances
- James Dean as Jeffrey Latham; Murvyn Vye as Mike Deegan; Edgar Stehli as Matt Schreiber

Episode chronology
← Previous "The Brute Next Door"	Next → "Too Many Nelsons"

"The Unlighted Road" is a 1955 television movie that was first broadcast on May 6, 1955, as part of the CBS television series Schlitz Playhouse of Stars. It starred James Dean who died less than five months after the production was aired.

== Plot ==
The program begins with an on-screen introduction by James Dean describing the play as the story of Jeffrey Latham who opened the door of a very innocent, ordinary looking roadside diner and found his whole life changed.

=== Act I ===
Jeffrey Latham, a Korean War veteran, enters a roadside diner and orders coffee and a sandwich. The cook, Mike Deegan, can't get the coffee machine to work, and Latham fixes it. Deegan offers Latham a job with meals included and a cot to sleep on in the back room. Days later, Latham asks about the two guys who are always hanging out in the booth. Deegan says they're Matt Schrieber and Roy Montana. Latham thinks they're bookies, but Deegan says Schreiber's in the car business. Deegan remains convinced there's something strange about Schreiber.

Ann Burnett asks Latham for permission to post a flyer for a community dance. Burnett and Latham flirt. They realize that Latham served in the same place in Korea where Burnett's brother was shot down and killed. Burnett agrees to save a couple dances for Latham at the dance. Latham drives Burnett home from the dance in Deegan's car. Latham says he's been drifting since Korea, hoping he'd find a nice town to settle down with a steady girl. He thinks he's found that place. They kiss goodnight.

=== Act II ===
Latham returns to the diner. He watches, unseen from the kitchen, as Montana tries to rob Schreiber. Deegan intervenes and knocks out Montana. Some time later, Latham mentions that he hasn't see Montana around in a couple days. Deegan asks Latham to make pickups for Schreiber. Latham doesn't want to get in trouble picking up hot cars. Deegan and Schreiber assure Latham that the pickups aren't of cars, and Latham agrees to make the pickups.

Latham is driving on an unlighted road. A police car appears behind him with lights and siren. The driver of the police car fires a gun at Latham. The police car crashes. Latham tells Schreiber and Deegan what happened. Schreiber and Deegan leave to check it out. They return and tell Latham that the cop broke his neck and died in the crash. Schreiber says they shoved the trooper's car, with the dead cop inside, into a water-filled quarry. Latham turns over the night's collections to Latham.

Latham feels guilty over the trooper's death. Deegan tells Latham that Schreiber's business is hot cargo from truck hijackings. The money Latham is picking up is crooked money for Schreiber. Deegan has to toe the line, or Schreiber will turn him in. Deegan gives money from the register to Latham and urges him to get far away. Schreiber enters, having overheard Deegan's advice. Schreiber tells Latham that he takes orders from Schreiber now, and if he doesn't do as he's told, Schreiber will tell the police what happened at the quarry. Latham feels trapped.

Latham visits Burnett late that night. He tells her she's in trouble. He tells her what happened with the police trooper. He plans to turn himself in. At the police station, Latham is questioned by the Captain about what happened at the quarry. The Captain reveals that Deegan has already made a statement and that they've retrieved the car from the quarry. The dead man was not a state trooper. The driver was Montana, and he was killed with a bullet in the head, not in the crash. The Captain says Latham will probably get off with probation. Latham reunites with Burnett as the program concludes.

== Cast ==
- James Dean as Jeffrey Latham
- Murvyn Vye as Mike Deegan
- Edgar Stehli as Matt Schreiber
- Patricia Hardy as Ann Burnett
- Charles Wagenheim as Roy Montana
- Voltaire Perkins as Captain

Bob Page - announcer and Schlitz spokesman

== Production ==
The Unlighted Road was filmed in January 1955, while Dean was on a break from the production of Rebel Without a Cause. Dean's first motion picture, East of Eden, was released in March 1955 and turned Dean into a star. The Unlighted Road was first broadcast on May 6, 1955, benefiting from Dean's new stardom.

The Unlighted Road aired as part of the CBS television series Schlitz Playhouse of Stars. William Self was the producer and Justus Addiss the director. Walter C. Brown wrote the screenplay.

Other than a commercial and interviews, it was Dean's final television appearance. It was also Dean's only teleplay to have been recorded on film rather than performed live.

The production was so popular that it was replayed in June 1955. Following Dean's death, it was replayed again in November 1956. It was subsequently shown at the Los Angeles County Museum of Art in 1986, and released on videotape in 1987. In 1991, it was part of a traveling exhibition by American Cinematheque of Dean's television work.
