= James Dean =

American actor (1931–1955)

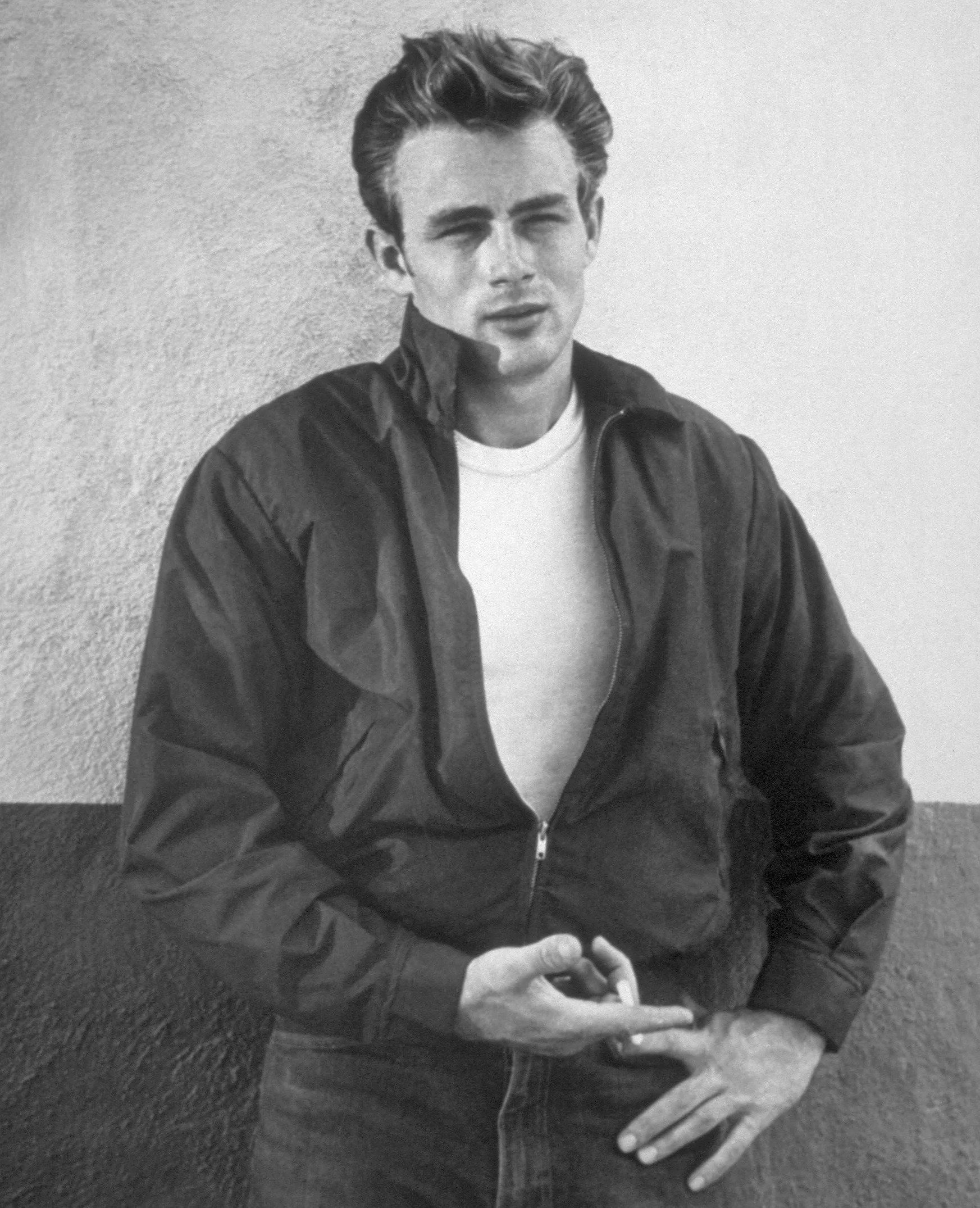
- Dean in a publicity still for Rebel Without a Cause (1955)
- Born: James Byron Dean; February 8, 1931; Marion, Indiana, U.S.
- Died: September 30, 1955 (aged 24) near Cholame, California, U.S.
- Cause of death: Car crash
- Resting place: Park Cemetery, Fairmount, Indiana, U.S.
- Occupation: Actor
- Years active: 1950–1955
- Height: 5 ft 8 in (1.73 m)
- Website: www.jamesdean.com

James Byron Dean (February 8, 1931 – September 30, 1955) was an American actor. He became one of the most influential figures in Hollywood in the 1950s, and his impact on cinema and popular culture was profound, although his career lasted only five years. He appeared in just three major films: East of Eden (1955), which showcased his intense emotional range; Rebel Without a Cause (1955), in which he portrayed a disillusioned and rebellious teenager; and Giant (1956), a sprawling drama. These have been preserved in the United States National Film Registry by the Library of Congress for their "cultural, historical, or aesthetic significance". He was killed in a car accident in 1955 at the age of 24, leaving him a lasting symbol of rebellion, youthful defiance, and the restless spirit.

For his role in East of Eden, Dean became the first actor to receive a posthumous Academy Award nomination for Best Actor. (Note: Jeanne Eagles was nominated posthumously for Best Actress for her role in The Letter at the 2nd Academy Awards in 1930, though hers, like all the nominations at the 2nd Academy Awards, was unofficial, being among several actresses "under consideration" by a board of judges. This makes Dean the first actor in the history of the Academy Awards to be nominated posthumously.) The following year, he earned a second nomination for his performance in Giant, making him the only actor to receive two posthumous acting nominations. In 1999, he was honored by the American Film Institute, being ranked as the 18th greatest male film star from Golden Age Hollywood on their "AFI's 100 Years...100 Stars" list. Time magazine recognized Dean in 2012 as one of the "All-Time Most Influential Fashion Icons". In 2026, Variety named him the 14th greatest movie star of all-time.

Dean's film roles and style had a strong impact on Hollywood, capturing the spirit of 1950s youth and creating an enduring legacy that helped shape American pop culture and define rebellious, countercultural attitudes for generations.

== Early life and education ==
James Byron Dean was born on February 8, 1931, in Marion, Indiana, the only child of Mildred Marie Wilson and Winton Dean. He stated that his mother was partly Native American and that his father descended from a "line of original settlers that could be traced back to the Mayflower". Six years after Winton left farming to become a dental technician, the family moved to Santa Monica, California. Dean first attended Brentwood Public School in the Brentwood neighborhood of Los Angeles, then transferred to McKinley Elementary School. The family remained in California for several years, and Dean was widely described as being very close to his mother. According to Michael DeAngelis, she was "the only person capable of understanding him". In 1938, she developed acute stomach pain and rapidly lost weight; she died of uterine cancer when Dean was nine years old. Unable to care for his son, Winton sent him to live with his aunt and uncle, Ortense and Marcus Winslow, on their farm in Fairmount, Indiana, where he was raised in their Quaker household. Winton served in World War II and later remarried.

During his adolescence, Dean sought guidance and companionship from a local Methodist pastor, the Rev. James DeWeerd, who appears to have influenced his later interests in bullfighting, car racing, and philosophy. Hollywood columnist and Dean biographer Joe Hyams alleged that Dean was molested as a teenager by DeWeerd, writing that "It was the beginning of a homosexual relationship that would endure over many years". Billy J. Harbin, a historian of American theater, cited Hyams when describing an intimate relationship between Dean and DeWeerd that began in Dean's senior year of high school and "endured for many years". Biographer Paul Alexander wrote in Boulevard of Broken Dreams that Dean and DeWeerd "had a romantic relationship that regularly included sex", presenting Dean as predominantly gay. A New York Times book review, however, stated that "Mr. Alexander's well-meaning stab at clarity may titillate, but it adds no light..." and dismissed some of his claims as "arrant nonsense". Kirkus Reviews similarly criticized the book as "riddled with errors" and containing "a great deal of unsubstantiated and highly speculative psychobiography". In 2011, The Daily Beast reported that Dean once confided in Elizabeth Taylor that he had been sexually abused by a minister approximately two years after his mother's death.

Although Dean's academic performance was unremarkable, he was a popular student and excelled in basketball despite standing just 5 ft 8 in (1.73 m) tall, his full adult height. He played baseball and varsity basketball, studied drama, and competed in public speaking through the Indiana High School Forensic Association. After graduating from Fairmount High School in May 1949, he returned to California to live with his father and stepmother, Ethel Case Dean. He enrolled at Santa Monica College as a pre-law major, then transferred to the University of California, Los Angeles (UCLA), where he changed his major to theater arts. His attempt to reconcile with his father ended in what Dean described as "uncommunicative antagonism", driven by Winton's efforts to steer him toward a more conventional career. Dean pledged Sigma Nu but was expelled after punching a fraternity brother. While at UCLA, he was selected from a group of 350 actors to portray Malcolm in Macbeth and also began studying in James Whitmore's acting workshop. In January 1951, he left UCLA to pursue acting full-time. Reflecting on his career choice, Dean later said, "The decision to act was never prompted. My whole life has been spent in a dramatic display of expression."

== Acting career ==
=== Early career ===
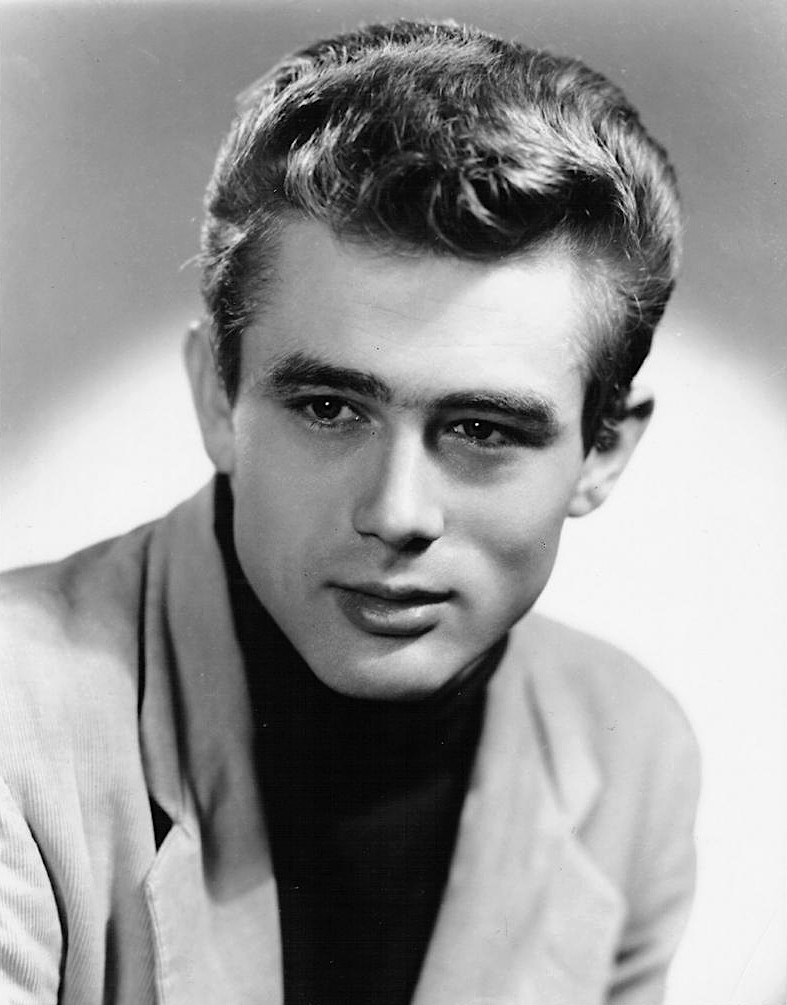
Dean in 1953 (aged 22)

Dean made his television debut in 1950 in a Pepsi commercial. He left college to pursue acting full‑time and received his first speaking role as John the Apostle in Hill Number One, an Easter television special dramatizing the Resurrection of Jesus. According to Robert Tanitch, the program drew an audience of 42,000,000 viewers. Dean then secured three bit parts: a soldier in Fixed Bayonets! (1951), a boxing cornerman in Sailor Beware (1952), and a youth in Has Anybody Seen My Gal (1952). While struggling to find work in Hollywood, he was employed as a parking lot attendant at CBS Studios. During this period, he met Rogers Brackett, a radio director for an advertising agency, who offered him professional guidance, career support, and a place to live. Brackett helped Dean obtain his first starring role on Broadway in See the Jaguar.

In July 1951, Dean appeared in Alias Jane Doe, a production overseen by Brackett. In October 1951, encouraged by actor James Whitmore and advised by Brackett, Dean moved to New York City. There, he briefly worked as a stunt tester for the game show Beat the Clock but was dismissed for allegedly completing the tasks too quickly. He also appeared in episodes of several CBS television series, including The Web, Studio One, and Lux Video Theatre, before gaining admission to the Actors Studio, where he studied method acting under Lee Strasberg. In 1952, he had a nonspeaking bit part as a pressman in Deadline – U.S.A., starring Humphrey Bogart.

Proud of his progress, Dean described the Actors Studio in a 1952 letter to his family as "the greatest school of the theater. It houses great people like Marlon Brando, Julie Harris, Arthur Kennedy, Mildred Dunnock, Eli Wallach... Very few get into it ... It is the best thing that can happen to an actor. I am one of the youngest to belong." At the Studio, he became close friends with Carroll Baker, with whom he later co‑starred in Giant (1956). Dean made only one solo presentation there. During the critique session that followed, Strasberg sharply criticized his performance of a scene adapted from Barnaby Conrad's bullfighting novel Matador. Dean stormed out and, although he continued attending classes, he never again submitted work for Strasberg's critiques.

Dean's career accelerated as he appeared in additional early‑1950s television programs, including Kraft Television Theatre, Robert Montgomery Presents, The United States Steel Hour, Danger, and General Electric Theater. In one early role, for the CBS series Omnibus in the episode "Glory in the Flower," he portrayed a disaffected youth similar to the character he would later play in Rebel Without a Cause (1955). The summer 1953 broadcast featured the song "Crazy Man, Crazy," making it one of the first dramatic television programs to include rock and roll.

Dean received strong reviews for his 1954 stage performance as Bachir, a pandering homosexual North African houseboy, in an adaptation of André Gide's 1902 novel The Immoralist (1902). The acclaim led to a call from Hollywood director Elia Kazan. During the production, according to actress Geraldine Page's daughter Angelica, Dean had an affair with her mother.

=== East of Eden ===
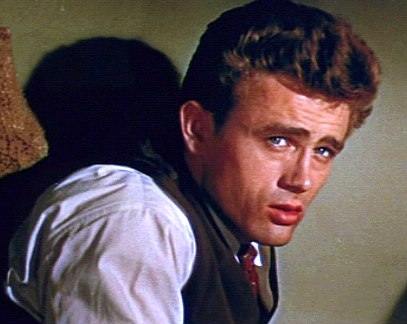
Dean in East of Eden (1955)

In 1953, Kazan sought a substantive young actor to portray Cal Trask in screenwriter Paul Osborn's adaptation of John Steinbeck's 1952 novel East of Eden. Steinbeck's book follows the Trask and Hamilton families across three generations in California's Salinas Valley, from the mid-19th century through the 1910s. The film, however, focused on the final portion of the narrative, centering on Cal. Although initially presented as aloof and emotionally troubled in contrast to his twin brother Aron, Cal is revealed to be more worldly, business‑minded, and perceptive than their pious and disapproving father, played by Raymond Massey, who is attempting to develop a vegetable refrigeration process. Cal becomes preoccupied with the mystery surrounding their supposedly dead mother and eventually discovers she is alive and working as a brothel‑keeping madam, portrayed by Jo Van Fleet.

Before casting Cal, Kazan said he wanted "a Brando type" for the role. Osborn suggested Dean, then a relatively unknown actor. Dean met with Steinbeck, who reportedly disliked him personally but believed he was ideal for the part. Dean was cast and, on April 8, 1954, left New York City for Los Angeles to begin filming.

Much of Dean's performance was improvised, including his dance in the bean field and his fetal‑like posture atop a train boxcar after searching for his mother in nearby Monterey. The film's most famous improvised moment occurs when Cal's father rejects his gift of $5,000—money Cal earned by speculating in beans before the United States entered World War I. Instead of running away as scripted, Dean instinctively embraced Massey in an anguished lunge, crying. Kazan kept both the gesture and Massey's genuine shock in the final cut. Dean's portrayal foreshadowed his later role as Jim Stark in Rebel Without a Cause; both characters are angst‑ridden, misunderstood young men seeking approval from their fathers.

After the film's release in March 1955, gossip columnist Hedda Hopper wrote that Dean's performance had already generated significant discussion in Hollywood, with critics, producers, and directors attending advance screenings. She added, "I can't remember when any screen newcomer generated as much excitement in Hollywood as did James Dean in his first picture, East of Eden."

For his performance, Dean received a posthumous nomination for Best Actor at the 28th Academy Awards in 1956, the first official posthumous acting nomination in the Academy's history. (Jeanne Eagels had been nominated for Best Actress in 1929, under different selection rules). East of Eden was the only film starring Dean released during his lifetime.

=== Rebel Without a Cause, Giant, and planned roles ===
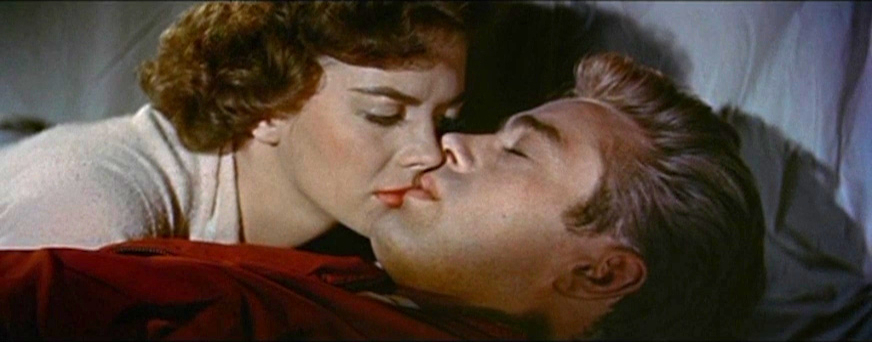
Natalie Wood and Dean in Rebel Without a Cause (1955)

Dean followed East of Eden with a starring role as Jim Stark in Rebel Without a Cause (1955), a film that became enormously popular among teenagers. Film‑studies scholar Claudia Springer wrote that Dean, by dying young, "became a legendary figure of inarticulate teenage angst." Drama professor Kenneth Krauss similarly argued that Dean was the first postwar movie star to embody teenage angst. After East of Eden and Rebel Without a Cause, Dean sought to avoid being typecast as a rebellious youth like Cal Trask or Jim Stark. He therefore accepted the role of Jett Rink, a Texan ranch hand who strikes oil and becomes wealthy, in Giant, a 1956 film released posthumously and based on Edna Ferber's novel of the same name. The film spans several decades in the lives of Bick Benedict, a Texas rancher played by Rock Hudson; his wife, Leslie, played by Elizabeth Taylor; and Rink. To portray an older version of his character in the film's later scenes, the make‑up department dyed Dean's hair gray and shaved portions of it to create a receding hairline.

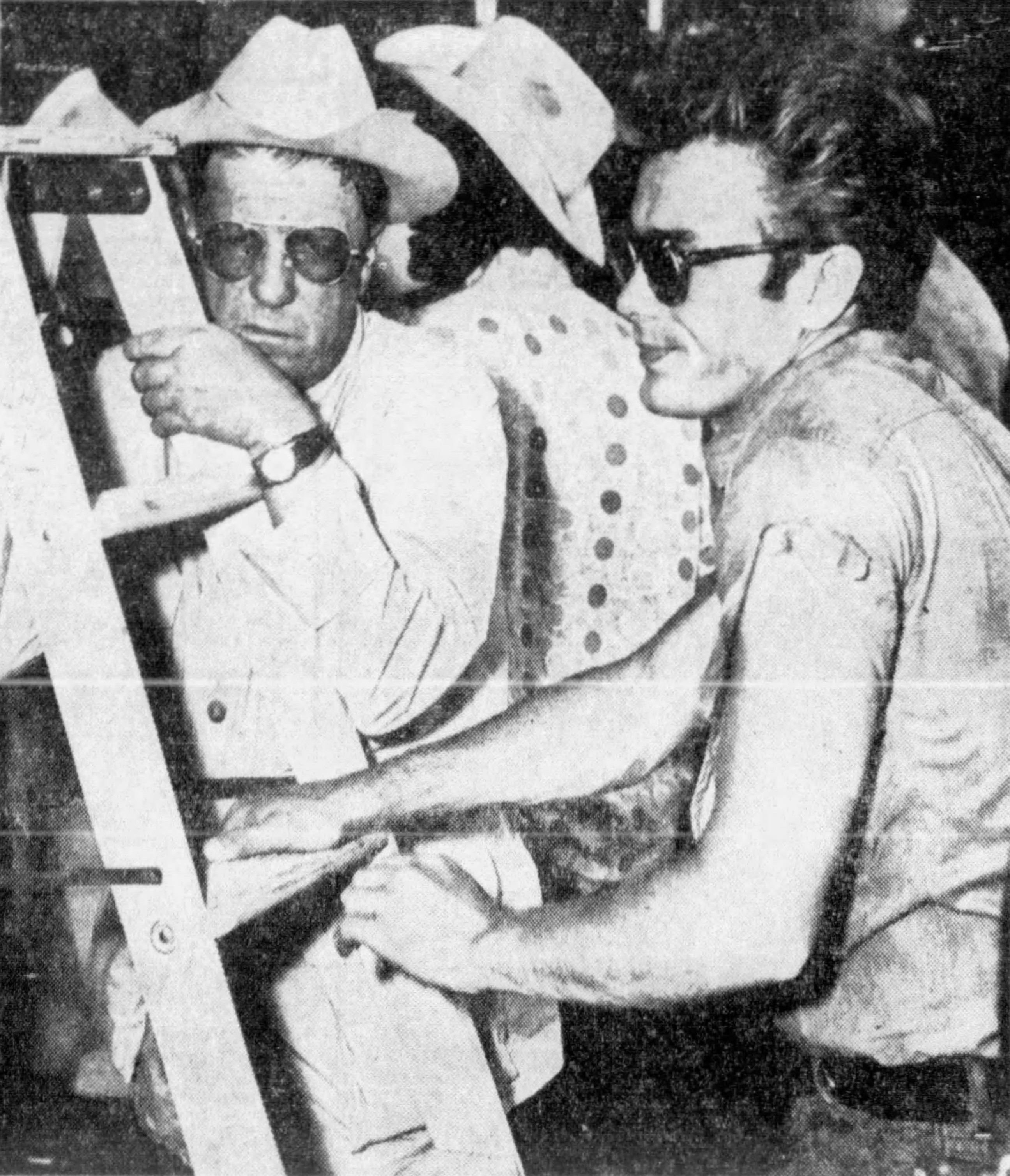
Dean on the set of Giant (1956) with director George Stevens

Giant proved to be Dean's final film. Near the end of the picture, Rink delivers a drunken speech at a banquet held in his honor, a scene John Howlett described as Jett's "last supper". Dean attempted to make the moment more realistic by becoming inebriated before filming, resulting in dialogue that was largely unintelligible. During editing, director George Stevens decided the scene had to be overdubbed by Nick Adams, as Dean had died by that point. Adams had a small role in the film as "Chick", though the studio mistakenly credited Jack Grinnage as the actor who played the part. Dean received his second posthumous Academy Award nomination for Best Actor for his performance in Giant at the 29th Academy Awards in 1957, honoring films released in 1956. After completing Giant, Dean had been set to star as Rocky Graziano in the drama Somebody Up There Likes Me (1956), and, according to director Nicholas Ray, he was also expected to appear in a project titled Heroic Love.

== Personal life ==
Screenwriter William Bast was one of Dean's closest friends, a fact acknowledged by Dean's family. According to Bast, he was Dean's roommate at UCLA and later in New York, and knew him throughout the last five years of his life. While at UCLA, Dean dated Beverly Wills, an actress with CBS, and Jeanette Lewis, a classmate. Bast and Dean often double-dated with them. Wills began seeing Dean alone and later told Bast, "Bill, there's something we have to tell you. It's Jimmy and me. I mean, we're in love." Their relationship ended after Dean "exploded" when another man asked her to dance at a social event. Bast, who became Dean's first biographer, did not confirm whether he and Dean had a sexual relationship until 2006. In his book Surviving James Dean, Bast was more explicit about the nature of their relationship, describing a night they spent together at a hotel in Borrego Springs.

In 1996, actress Liz Sheridan described her relationship with Dean in New York in 1952, calling it "...just kind of magical. It was the first love for both of us." While living in New York, Dean was introduced to actress Barbara Glenn by their mutual friend Martin Landau. Dean and Glenn dated for two years, frequently breaking up and reconciling. In 2011, their love letters were sold at auction for $36,000.

Early in Dean's career, after he signed with Warner Brothers, the studio's public relations department began circulating stories about his supposed romances with various young actresses, most of whom were clients of his Hollywood agent, Dick Clayton. Studio press releases also grouped Dean with actors Rock Hudson and Tab Hunter, presenting all three as "eligible bachelors" who had not yet found time to settle down: "They say their film rehearsals are in conflict with their marriage rehearsals."

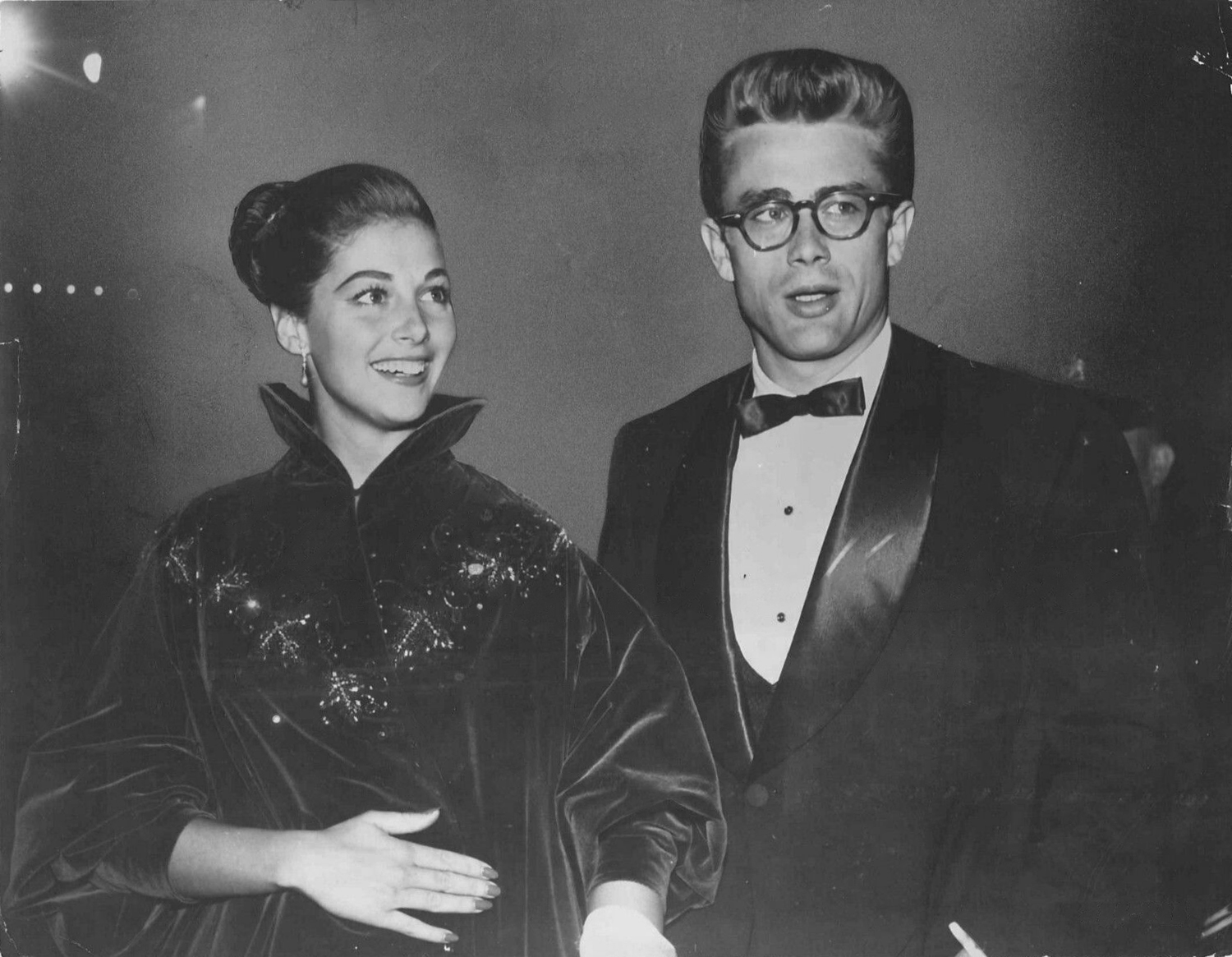
Dean with Pier Angeli at the premiere of A Star Is Born (1954)

Dean's best-remembered relationship was with Italian actress Pier Angeli. He met Angeli while she was filming The Silver Chalice (1954) on an adjoining Warner lot, and the two exchanged pieces of jewelry as love tokens. In his 1992 biography James Dean: Little Boy Lost, Hollywood gossip columnist Joe Hyams, who said he knew Dean personally, devoted an entire chapter to their relationship. Fourteen years after it ended, Angeli described their time together:

We used to go together to the California coast and stay there secretly in a cottage on a beach far away from prying eyes. We'd spend much of our time on the beach, sitting there or fooling around, just like college kids. We would talk about ourselves and our problems, about the movies and acting, about life and life after death. We had a complete understanding of each other. We were like Romeo and Juliet, together and inseparable. Sometimes on the beach we loved each other so much we just wanted to walk together into the sea holding hands because we knew then that we would always be together.

Dean was quoted as saying of Angeli, "Everything about Pier is beautiful, especially her soul. She doesn't have to be all gussied up. She doesn't have to do or say anything. She's just wonderful as she is. She has a rare insight into life."

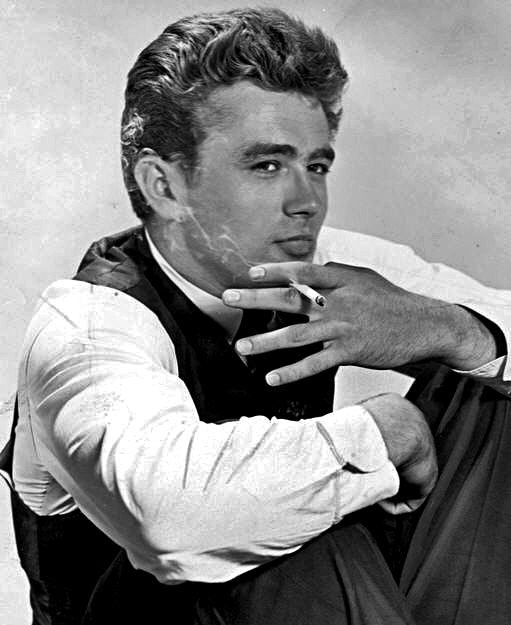
Dean in 1955

Those who believed Dean and Angeli were deeply in love argued that several circumstances drove them apart. Angeli's mother disapproved of Dean because he was not Catholic and because she found his casual dress and behavior unacceptable by Italian standards. Warner Bros., where Dean worked, also discouraged him from marrying, and Dean himself told Angeli that he did not want to marry. Richard Davalos, Dean's East of Eden co-star, later claimed that Dean did want to marry Angeli and was willing to have their children raised Catholic. According to Hyams, Lew Bracker, one of Dean's closest friends in Hollywood, visited Dean's apartment after his death to collect personal effects for Dean's father, Winton. Bracker later returned to inventory the items and found a complete "Order for the Solemnization of Marriage" pamphlet with the name "Pier" lightly penciled in every space reserved for the bride's name.

Bast believed the relationship was largely a publicity creation. In his autobiography, A Life, East of Eden director Kazan dismissed the idea that Dean could have had much success with women, although he claimed to remember hearing Dean and Angeli loudly making love in Dean's dressing room. Bast mocked this assertion, noting that Kazan—and no one else—would have had to hear such noises through solid walls across a heavily trafficked corridor. Kazan was quoted by author Paul Donnelley as saying of Dean, "He always had uncertain relations with girlfriends." Angeli spoke publicly about the relationship only once in later life, offering vivid descriptions of romantic meetings at the beach. Writer Peter Winkler argued that these recollections read like "pathetic fantasies". Bast similarly maintained that the two were using each other for publicity and that it would have been nearly impossible for them to have had sex on the beach, given that Angeli's mother rarely allowed her out of her sight for more than an hour.

After completing East of Eden, Dean took a brief trip to New York in October 1954. While he was away, Angeli unexpectedly announced her engagement to Italian‑American singer Vic Damone. The press expressed surprise, and Dean was irritated by the news. Angeli married Damone the following month. Gossip columnists later claimed that Dean watched the wedding from across the street on his motorcycle and revved the engine during the ceremony. Bast wrote that Dean had actually hired a stand‑in to ride a Harley‑Davidson to the church and that, when the couple emerged to be showered with rice, the double gunned the engine for dramatic effect before riding off in front of assembled photographers. Angeli, who later divorced Damone and then her second husband, Italian film composer Armando Trovajoli, was said by friends in her final years to have claimed that Dean was the love of her life. She died of a barbiturate overdose in 1971 at the age of 39. Dean also dated Swiss actress Ursula Andress. "She was seen riding around Hollywood on the back of James's motorcycle," wrote biographer Darwin Porter. She was also seen with him in his sports cars and was with him on the day he bought the car in which he later died.

After being cast as Jim Stark in Rebel Without a Cause, Dean could afford to rent his own place and moved into a garage apartment on Sunset Plaza Drive. During the film's production, the nearby Googie's Coffee Shop, across from the Chateau Marmont on Sunset Strip, became his preferred late‑night hangout, along with Schwab's Pharmacy. He spent time there with a loose group of insomniacs and misfits known as the "night watch", including actress Maila Nurmi, known for her Vampira character on KABC-TV; Jack Simmons, a gay aspiring actor who idolized Dean; and John Gilmore, an actor and Dean's motorcycle riding companion.

=== Sexuality ===
Dean is often considered a sexual icon because of his perceived experimental take on life, which included his ambivalent sexuality. The Gay Times Readers' Awards cited him as the greatest male gay icon of all time. When questioned about his sexual orientation, Dean is reported to have said, "No, I am not a homosexual. But I'm also not going to go through life with one hand tied behind my back."

The journalist Joe Hyams suggests that Dean was willing to have sex with men who could advance his career. He moved in with Rogers Brackett, an advertising executive who had connections in the entertainment industry and supposedly arranged meetings with them on Dean's behalf, leading to speculation that Dean was having sex "for trade". William Bast referred to Dean as Rogers Brackett's "kept boy" and once found a grotesque depiction of a lizard with the head of Brackett in a sketchbook belonging to Dean. Brackett was quoted saying about their relationship, "My primary interest in Jimmy was as an actor—his talent was so obvious. Secondarily, I loved him, and Jimmy loved me. If it was a father-son relationship, it was also somewhat incestuous." James Bellah, the son of American Western author James Warner Bellah, was a friend of Dean's at UCLA, and later stated, "Dean was a user. I don't think he was homosexual. But if he could get something by performing an act ... Once ... at an agent's office, Dean told me that he had spent the summer as a 'professional house guest' on Fire Island." Mark Rydell stated, "I don't think he was essentially homosexual. I think that he had very big appetites, and I think he exercised them."

Aside from Bast's account of his own relationship with Dean, Dean's fellow motorcyclist and "Night Watch" member, John Gilmore, claimed that he and Dean "experimented" with gay sex on multiple occasions in New York, describing their sexual encounters as "Bad boys playing bad boys while opening up the bisexual sides of ourselves." Gilmore on another occasion said, "That's how it was, neither black nor white. Jimmy thought of himself as an explorer, making discoveries in life, things, and sex."

On the subject of Dean's sexuality, Rebel director Nicholas Ray is on record saying, "James Dean was not straight, he was not gay, he was bisexual. That seems to confuse people, or they just ignore the facts. Some—most—will say he was heterosexual, and there's some proof for that, apart from the usual dating of actresses his age. Others will say no, he was gay, and there's some proof for that, too, keeping in mind that it's always tougher to get that kind of proof. But Jimmy himself said more than once that he swung both ways, so why all the mystery or confusion?" Martin Landau, a good friend of Dean's whom he met at the Actors Studio, stated, "A lot of people say Jimmy was hell-bent on killing himself. Not true. A lot of gay guys make him out to be gay. Not true. When Jimmy and I were together, we'd talk about girls. Actors and girls. We were kids in our early 20s. That was what we aspired to." Elizabeth Taylor, whom Dean had become friends with while working together on Giant, referred to Dean as gay during a speech at the GLAAD Media Awards in 2000. When questioned about Dean's sexuality by the openly gay journalist Kevin Sessums for POZ magazine, Taylor responded, "He hadn't made up his mind. He was only 24 when he died. But he was certainly fascinated by women. He flirted around. He and I ... twinkled."

== Death ==
=== Auto racing hobby ===
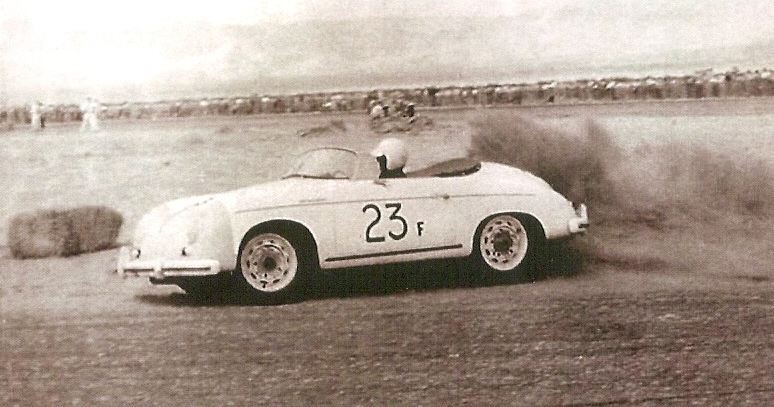
Dean and his Porsche Super Speedster 23F at Palm Springs Races, March 1955

In 1954, Dean developed a serious interest in motorsport. After filming for East of Eden concluded, he bought a Triumph Tiger T110 motorcycle, and in March 1955—just as East of Eden was being released—he purchased a Porsche 356 Super Speedster convertible. Driving the Speedster and its 1,500 cc engine, he placed in several major racing events. Shortly before filming began on Rebel Without a Cause, he entered his first professional competition at the Palm Springs Road Races on March 26–27, 1955. Dean won the novice class and finished second in the main event. On May 1, 1955, he raced the Speedster at Minter Field in Bakersfield, California, placing third. He hoped to compete in the Indianapolis 500, but his schedule made participation impossible.

Dean's final race took place in Santa Barbara on Memorial Day, May 30, 1955. A blown piston forced him to withdraw from the event. His brief racing career was then paused when director George Stevens barred him from racing during the production of Giant. Dean had completed his scenes, and the film had entered post‑production, when he decided to return to racing.

=== Accident and aftermath ===
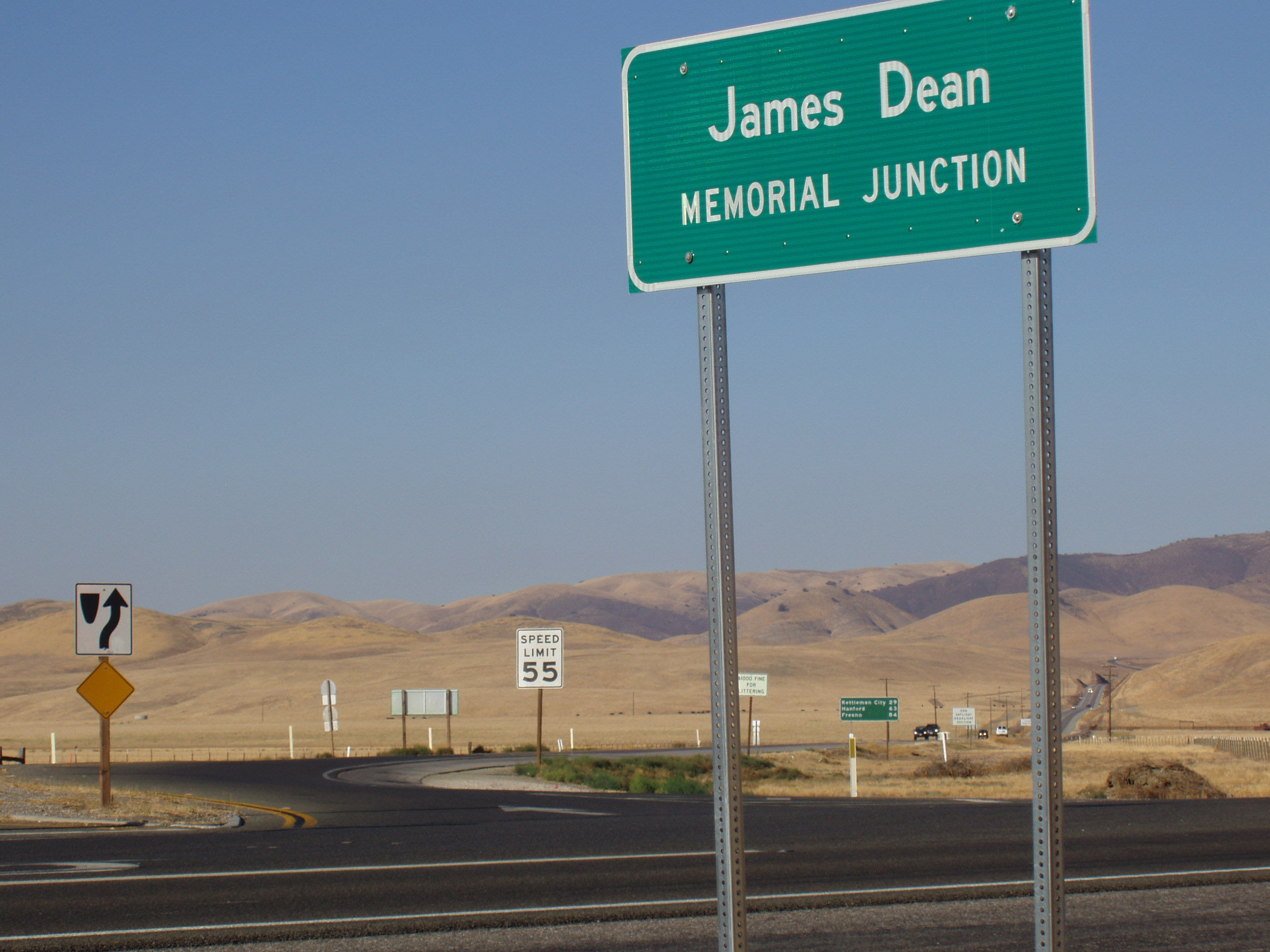
The intersection of State Route 46 and State Route 41 was renamed "James Dean Memorial Junction". However, the actual accident location is approximately 100 feet (0.019 mi) to the south due to road realignment.

Longing to return to the "liberating prospects" of motor racing, Dean traded in his Speedster for a new, more powerful 1955 Porsche 550 Spyder and entered the upcoming Salinas Road Race scheduled for October 2, 1955. Accompanying him on the drive to the track on September 30 were stunt coordinator Bill Hickman, Collier's photographer Sanford Roth, and Rolf Wütherich, the German Porsche factory mechanic who maintained Dean's Spyder, nicknamed "Little Bastard". Wütherich, who had encouraged Dean to drive the car from Los Angeles to Salinas to break it in, rode with him in the Porsche. At 3:30 pm, Dean was ticketed for speeding, as was Hickman, who was following behind in another vehicle.

On Friday, September 30, at approximately 5:45 pm, the group was traveling westbound on U.S. Route 466 (now SR 46) near Cholame, California, while Donald Gene Turnupseed, a Cal Poly State University student, was driving east. Turnupseed, heading north toward Fresno, attempted to turn left onto Highway 41 in front of the oncoming Porsche. Dean, unable to stop in time, struck the driver's side of Turnupseed's Ford. The impact sent the Porsche skidding across the pavement and off the highway. Wütherich was thrown from the car, while Dean remained trapped and sustained fatal injuries, including a broken neck. Turnupseed suffered only minor injuries.

Several bystanders witnessed the crash and stopped to help. Dean's biographer George Perry wrote that a woman with nursing experience attended to Dean and detected a weak pulse, though he also noted that "death appeared to have been instantaneous". Dean was pronounced dead on arrival at the Paso Robles War Memorial Hospital at 6:20 pm.

Although news of the crash was initially slow to reach newspapers in the eastern United States, details spread rapidly via radio and television. By October 2, his death had received extensive domestic and international coverage. On Monday morning, October 3, deputy coroner John Stander signed the death certificate, stating that "24‑year‑old James Byron Dean, actor, never married, had met his death on 30 September 1955 at 5.45 pm, one mile east of Cholame at the junction of Highways 466 and 41 in San Luis Obispo County. Chief cause of death was a broken neck, with numerous other fractures and internal injuries." Sheriff‑coroner Paul E. Merrick ordered an inquest, held in the Paso Robles City Council Chamber at 10 am the following Tuesday.

Dean's funeral took place on October 8, 1955, at the Fairmount Friends Church in Fairmount, Indiana. The coffin remained closed due to the severity of his injuries. Approximately 600 mourners attended the service, while an estimated 2,400 fans gathered outside during the procession. He is buried at Park Cemetery in Fairmount.

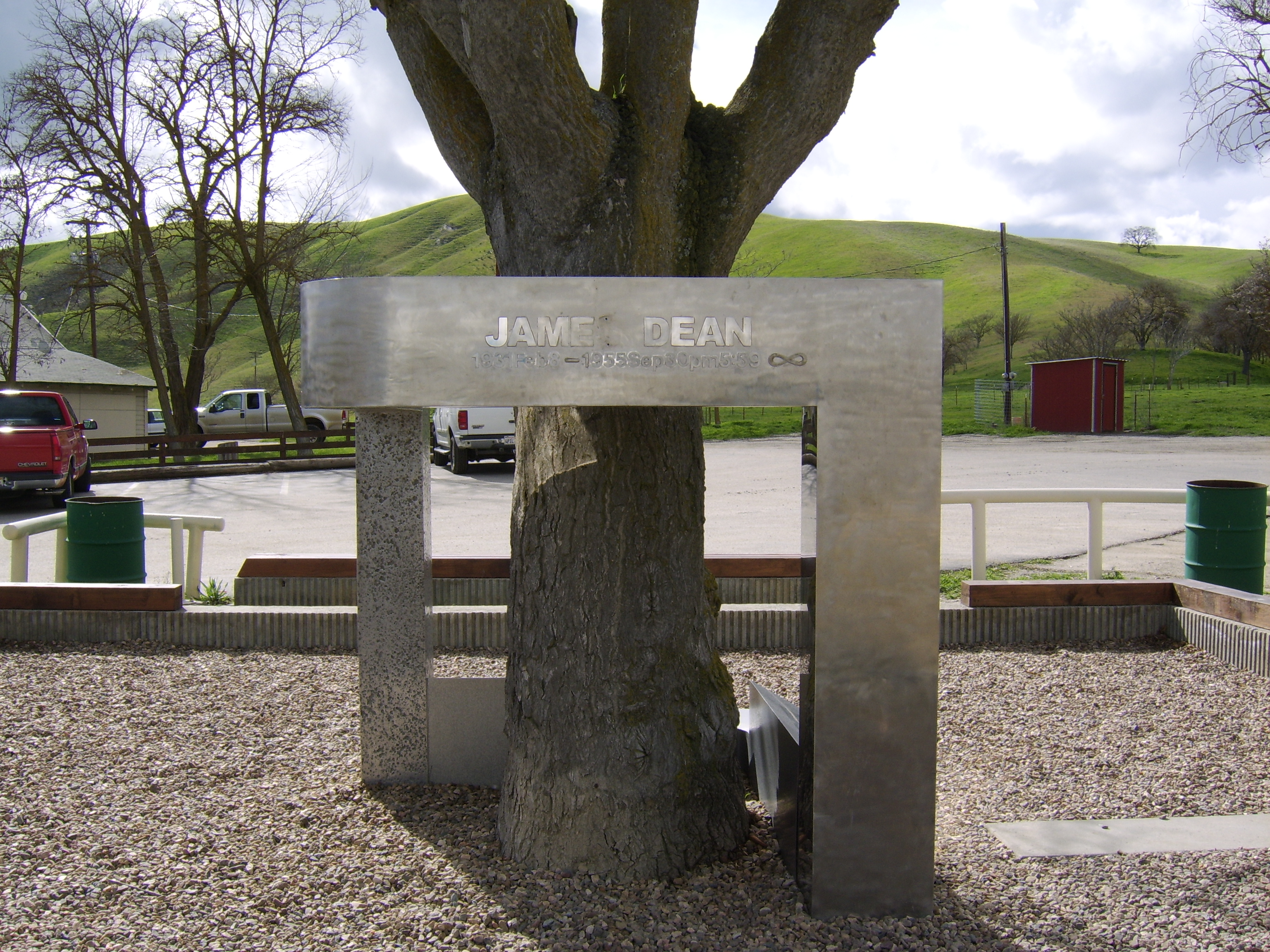
James Dean monument at Cholame, half a mile from the site of the fatal accident

On October 11, after deliberating for only twenty minutes, the inquest jury returned a verdict stating, "We find no indication that James Dean met death through any criminal act of another, and that he died of a fractured neck and other injuries received." A stainless‑steel James Dean monument, built in Japan and brought to the crash site by Japanese businessman Seita Ohnishi in 1977, now stands in front of the former Cholame post office.

Actor Alec Guinness later claimed that, in a chance encounter with Dean at the Villa Capri a week before the crash, he had predicted the young actor's death in his newly purchased sports car. In his autobiography, Guinness wrote that when Dean proudly showed him the vehicle, he found it "sinister" and recalled saying, in a voice he barely recognized, "Please, never get in it." He then added, "It is now ten o'clock, Friday the 23rd of September, 1955. If you get in that car you will be found dead in it by this time next week." Dean reportedly laughed and replied, "Oh, shucks! Don't be so mean!" Author Jason Colavito argues that the story is "almost certainly Guinness's ex post facto fabrication," noting that at the time Guinness merely said Dean had told him that friends had begged him not to buy the car because they feared he would drive it too fast.

== Legacy ==
=== Cinema and television ===
In 1960, Dean received a star on the Hollywood Walk of Fame. In 1999, the American Film Institute ranked him the 18th-greatest male legend of Golden Age Hollywood in its AFI's 100 Years...100 Stars list. All three of Dean's films have been preserved in the United States National Film Registry by the Library of Congress. American teenagers of the mid-1950s, when Dean's major films were first released, strongly identified with him and the characters he portrayed, especially Jim Stark in Rebel Without a Cause. The film depicts the dilemma of a teenager who feels misunderstood by both adults and peers. After Dean's death, Humphrey Bogart remarked on his emerging legend: "Dean died at just the right time. He left behind a legend. If he had lived, he'd never have been able to live up to his publicity."

Historian David Halberstam writes that the success of East of Eden was "stunning", and that it was perhaps director Kazan's best film. He calls Dean's performance a sensation and quotes Pauline Kael, the influential film critic: "There is a new image in American films, [...] the young boy as beautiful, disturbed animal." Halberstam says even Kazan was surprised by Dean's impact, surpassing that of the young Marlon Brando. Years later Kazan said Dean had cast a spell over the youth of America. In Halberstam's estimation, the screenplay of Rebel Without a Cause is weak, and what power the movie has is in Dean's performance. He posits that the actor's "myth" is largely interwoven with his role as Jim Stark, "the prototype for the alienated youth blaming all injustice on parents and their generation."

Terence Pettigrew writes that Dean's acting had an immediate effect on the youth of the mid‑1950s, influencing how young people dressed and behaved more than any other actor. Pettigrew describes how the youth revolution brought about by the post‑World War II economic boom in the United States reflected a universal desire among young people across all social levels for recognition of their individuality. Freed from the hardships of the Great Depression and the war endured by earlier generations, teenagers sought their own identity. Dean embodied the alienation and confusion felt by both middle‑class college students and disaffected youth in lower‑income environments. The characters he played onscreen made him a potent symbol of their doubts and inarticulate desires, and his young audience recognised in him their own anger and distrust of the adult world.

The film scholar Timothy Shary argues that Jim Stark, the role played by Dean in Rebel Without a Cause, became the most influential teenage rebel in American cinema. He notes that while Warner Bros. aimed to capitalize on a trend of depicting tormented adolescents in films made by smaller studios, the movie created by Nicholas Ray and his team addressed genuine tensions in teenage life. These feelings were given voice and personified by Dean, leading to his veneration as an icon of cool. His image made the film an "indelible symbol of youth trying to discover themselves and declare their identity."

The film critic David Thomson says James Dean was oneself, and that "one marveled in the way a savage might be awed by a mirror." For Thomson, Dean's potency was not as a rebel without a cause. He cites Dean's anguished cry when Sal Mineo is shot as the "very antithesis" of the film's title. In his view, Dean as shown on the screen projected sensitivity and vulnerability, but he never seemed callow—he appeared more experienced, older, and sadder than the grownups in his films. He appealed to young people because he understood that they knew some truths about the world, too. Thomson declares that Dean is not dated—new generations still fall under his sway. In a very short time he changed the milieu of American culture, and now Dean's intelligence and his sexual ambiguity are more obvious.

Joe Hyams says that Dean was "one of the rare stars, like Rock Hudson and Montgomery Clift, whom both men and women find sexy." According to Marjorie Garber, this quality is "the indefinable extra something that makes a star". Dean biographer George Perry attributed Dean's exalted status to the public's need for someone to stand up for the disenfranchised young of the era, and to the air of androgyny that he projected onscreen.

François Truffaut, the filmmaker and critic who "likened Dean's style of performance to rock and roll" and praised his originality, wrote an essay about Dean, James Dean is Dead. He writes:

James Dean's acting flies in the face of fifty years of filmmaking; each gesture, attitude, each mimicry is a slap at the psychological tradition. [...] Dean's acting is more animal than human, and that makes him unpredictable. What will his next gesture be? He may keep talking and turn his back to the camera as he finishes a scene; he may suddenly throw his head back or let it droop; he may raise his arms to heaven, stretch them forward, palms up to convince, down to reject. [...] He can laugh when another actor would cry—or the opposite. He killed psychology the day he appeared on the set. [...] Dean's power of seduction was so intense that he could have killed his parents every night on the screen with the blessing of the snobs and the general public alike. [...] It is easier to identify with James Dean than with Humphrey Bogart, Cary Grant, or Marlon Brando. Dean's personality is truer.

Dean has been a touchstone of many television shows, films, books, and plays. The film September 30, 1955 (1977) depicts how various characters in a small Southern town in the US react to Dean's death. The play Come Back to the Five and Dime, Jimmy Dean, Jimmy Dean, written by Ed Graczyk, depicts a reunion of Dean fans on the 20th anniversary of his death. It was staged by the director Robert Altman in 1982 but was poorly received and closed after only 52 performances. While the play was still running on Broadway, Altman shot a film adaptation that was released by Cinecom Pictures in November 1982.

On April 20, 2010, a long "lost" live episode of the General Electric Theater called "The Dark, Dark Hours" featuring Dean in a performance with Ronald Reagan was uncovered by NBC writer Wayne Federman while working on a Ronald Reagan television retrospective. The episode, originally broadcast on December 12, 1954, drew international attention, and highlights were featured on numerous national media outlets including: CBS Evening News, NBC Nightly News, and Good Morning America. It was later revealed that some footage from the episode had first featured in the 2005 documentary, James Dean: Forever Young.

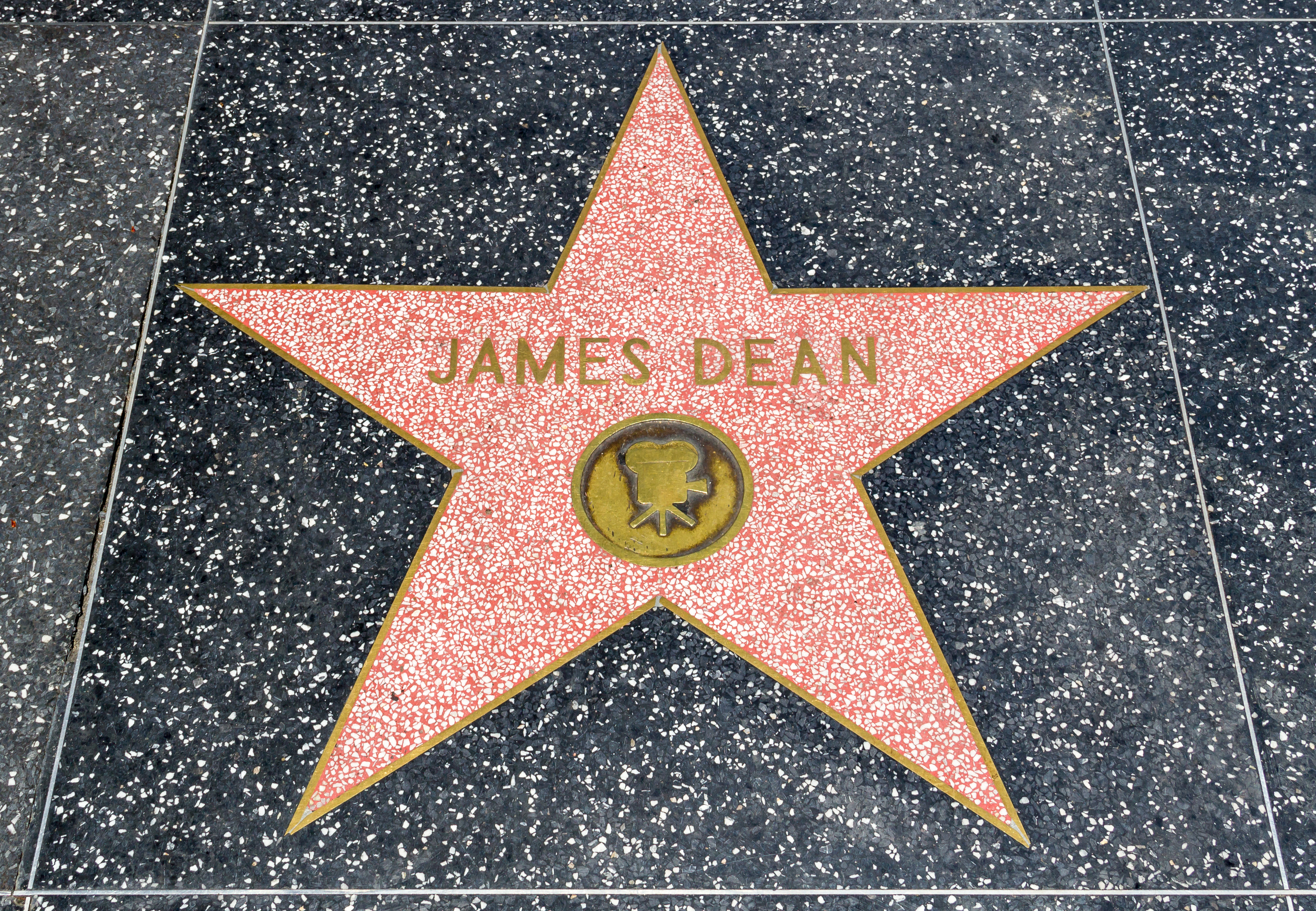
Dean's star on the Hollywood Walk of Fame

As of January 2020, Dean's estate had its best showing on Forbes' annual list of the top-earning dead celebrities in 2015, with an income that year of US$8.5 million. On November 6, 2019, it was announced that Dean's likeness would be used, via CGI, for a Vietnam War film called Finding Jack, based on the Gareth Crocker novel. Prior to being shelved, the movie was to have been directed by Anton Ernst and Tati Golykh, and another actor would have voiced Dean's part. Although the directors obtained the rights to use Dean's image from his family, the announcement was met with derision by people in the industry.

Martin Sheen has been vocal throughout his career about being influenced by Dean. Speaking of the impact Dean had on him personally, Sheen stated, "All of his movies had a profound effect on my life, in my work and all of my generation. He transcended cinema acting. It was no longer acting, it was human behavior."

Johnny Depp credited Dean as the catalyst for his wanting to become an actor. Nicolas Cage also said he wanted to go into acting because of Dean. "I started acting because I wanted to be James Dean. I saw him in Rebel Without a Cause, East of Eden. Nothing affected me—no rock song, no classical music—the way Dean affected me in Eden. It blew my mind. I was like, 'That's what I want to do,'" Cage said. Robert De Niro cited Dean as one of his acting inspirations in an interview. Leonardo DiCaprio also cited Dean as one of his favorite and most influential actors. When asked which performances stayed with him the most, DiCaprio responded, "I remember being incredibly moved by Jimmy Dean, in East of Eden. There was something so raw and powerful about that performance. His vulnerability ... his confusion about his entire history, his identity, his desperation to be loved. That performance just broke my heart." Salman Shah, commonly regarded as one of the most popular and influential figures in Bangladesh's film history, is often compared to Dean, because of the similarities in their lives and careers. Shah had an ephemeral but prolific impact as an actor, was a major enthusiast of fashion and automobiles, died when he was 24—the same age as Dean—and has an enduring legacy.

=== Youth culture and music ===
Numerous commentators have asserted that Dean had a singular influence on the development of rock and roll music. According to David R. Shumway, a researcher in American culture and cultural theory at Carnegie Mellon University, Dean was the first notable figure of youthful rebellion and "a harbinger of youth-identity politics". The persona Dean projected in his movies, especially Rebel Without a Cause, influenced Elvis Presley and many other musicians who followed, including the American rockers Eddie Cochran and Gene Vincent.

In their book, Live Fast, Die Young: The Wild Ride of Making Rebel Without a Cause, Lawrence Frascella and Al Weisel wrote, "Ironically, though Rebel had no rock music on its soundtrack, the film's sensibility—and especially the defiant attitude and effortless cool of James Dean—would have a great impact on rock. The music media would often see Dean and rock as inextricably linked [...] The industry trade magazine Music Connection went so far as to call Dean 'the first rock star.'"

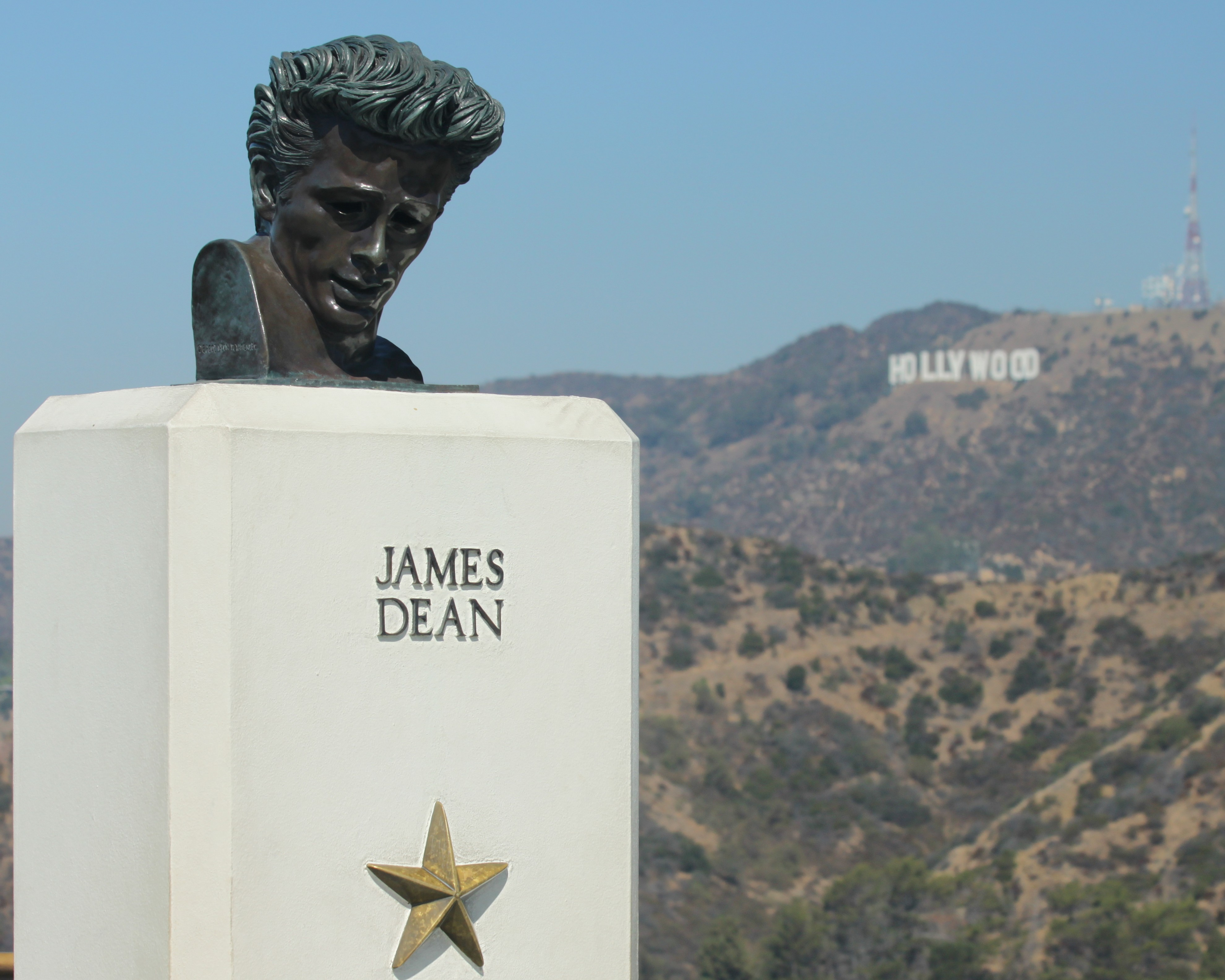
Bronze bust of Dean created by sculptor Kenneth Kendall at the Griffith Observatory in Los Angeles, California

As rock and roll became a revolutionary force that affected the culture of countries around the world, Dean acquired a mythic status that cemented his place as a rock and roll icon. Dean himself listened to music ranging from African tribal music to the modern classical music of Stravinsky as well as to contemporary singers such as Frank Sinatra and Bartók. While the magnetism and charisma manifested by Dean onscreen appealed to people of all ages and sexes, his persona of youthful rebellion provided a template for succeeding generations of youth to model themselves on.

In his book, The Origins of Cool in Postwar America, Joel Dinerstein describes how Dean and Marlon Brando eroticized the rebel archetype in film, and how Elvis Presley, following their lead, did the same in music. Dinerstein details the dynamics of this eroticization and its effect on teenage girls with few sexual outlets. Presley said in a 1956 interview with Lloyd Shearer for Parade magazine, "I've made a study of Marlon Brando. And I've made a study of poor Jimmy Dean. I've made a study of myself, and I know why girls, at least the young 'uns, go for us. We're sullen, we're broodin', we're something of a menace. I don't understand it exactly, but that's what the girls like in men. I don't know anything about Hollywood, but I know you can't be sexy if you smile. You can't be a rebel if you grin."

Dean and Presley have often been represented in academic literature and in journalism as embodying the frustration felt by young white Americans with the values of their parents, and depicted as avatars of the youthful unrest endemic to rock and roll style and attitude. The rock historian Greil Marcus characterized them as symbols of tribal teenage identity, which provided an image that young people in the 1950s could relate to and imitate. In the book Lonely Places, Dangerous Ground: Nicholas Ray in American Cinema, Paul Anthony Johnson wrote that Dean's acting in Rebel Without a Cause provided a "performance model for Presley, Buddy Holly, and Bob Dylan, all of whom borrowed elements of Dean's performance in their own carefully constructed star personas". Frascella and Weisel wrote, "As rock music became the defining expression of youth in the 1960s, the influence of Rebel was conveyed to a new generation."

Rock musicians as diverse as Buddy Holly, Bob Dylan, and David Bowie regarded Dean as a formative influence. The playwright and actor Sam Shepard interviewed Dylan in 1986 and wrote a play based on their conversation, in which Dylan discusses the early influence of Dean on him personally. A young Bob Dylan, still in his folk music period, consciously evoked Dean visually on the cover of his album, The Freewheelin' Bob Dylan (1963), and later on Highway 61 Revisited (1965), cultivating an image that his biographer Bob Spitz called "James Dean with a guitar". Dean has long been invoked in the lyrics of rock songs, famously in songs such as "A Young Man Is Gone" by the Beach Boys (1963), "James Dean" by the Eagles (1974), and "James Dean" by the Goo Goo Dolls (1989). He has also been referenced in songs by artists such as Morrissey, Jay-Z, Lady Gaga,, Taylor Swift, and Slayyyter.

=== Fashion ===
James Laver, the historian and critic of costume and fashion, says that in the 1950s a fashion market arose that catered to young people with large disposable incomes, and that there was a general relaxation of dress codes among them. He writes, "James Dean and Marlon Brando popularized jeans and the motorbike jacket and also transformed the T-shirt into a fashionable item of clothing." According to the clothing designer Julian Robinson, "James Dean heralded the era of T-shirts, jeans and bomber jackets and a welcome blurring of class and wealth barriers." Dean was frequently photographed wearing his signature outfit of jeans, a white T-shirt, and a motorcycle jacket, evoking an outsider and rebel image, especially reflected in the symbolic mystique of the motorcycle jacket. According to Edgar Morin, with his wardrobe Dean expressed an attitude towards society of resistance against the social conventions of adults. The philosopher Malcolm Barnard writes that denim jeans, formerly worn as rural work clothes, "revealed the form of the body rather than covering it". He says they became a symbol of youthful defiance of authority, according to social commentators, when James Dean and Marlon Brando wore them in 1950s films.

Frascella and Weisel call the red jacket Dean wore in Rebel "one of the most iconic pieces of clothing ever worn by a Hollywood star". They recount the differing stories told by persons involved in the film's production about the origin of the red jacket: Nicholas Ray is quoted as saying, "the first thing I did was pull a red jacket off the Red Cross man, dip it in black paint to take off the sheen and give it to Jimmy." The actor Frank Mazzola said he accompanied Dean on a shopping trip to Mattson's clothing store on Hollywood Boulevard, and "The red jacket was really an Athenian jacket that we bought cheaply at Mattson's. They were blue, so the guy at Warner Brothers dyed it red." The film's costume designer, Moss Mabry, said he made three of the jackets. Ray had originally told him the jacket should be khaki. He went to Ray's office to show him swatches of the fabric he'd chosen, and while he was waiting to see the director, "This guy walked in with a red jacket just trying to get a part. And I was fascinated. How good he looked in that red jacket. So I went back to the wardrobe department and cut off a swatch of red." Ray approved the samples and Mabry worked out the pattern for the jacket and cut it from a bolt of red nylon.

Claudia Springer assigns James Dean a central role in the development of the icon of the teen rebel in the 1950s and details how the studios and the media manipulated Dean's public image for their own ends. The advertising industry exploited the ambiguity of the rebel icon as an "endlessly malleable and durable marketing tool", and now James Dean "has become the consummate product of commercialism." According to Springer, his image and his name have sold hundreds of millions of items.

Rebel was one of the first films to use product placement directed toward teenagers—sales of Ace combs soared after James Dean was shown using one to comb his hair in the movie. In 1955, the celebrity photographer Phil Stern photographed Dean leaning back in a chair on the Los Angeles set of Giant while wearing wide-legged khaki pants and Jack Purcell tennis shoes. The famous image was exploited in the late 1980s with an advertising campaign by Converse, which had acquired the Jack Purcell shoe in 1972. Converse paid Stern more than $50,000 for using the photo. Company officials said the campaign increased brand sales by 30 to 50 percent.

James Dean has been recognized by Time magazine as one of the "All Time 100 Fashion Icons", highlighting his lasting impact on style and pop culture. Montblanc honored Dean as part of its "Great Characters" collection which celebrates influential figures from various fields who have had a lasting impact on culture and society. Harper's Bazaar ranked James Dean as the top choice in their 2024 list of "The 50 Hottest Men of All Time."

== Acting credits ==
=== Film ===
Year	Title	Role	Director	Notes	Ref.
1951	Fixed Bayonets!	Hoggie	Samuel Fuller	Uncredited	
1952	Sailor Beware	Boxing Trainer	Hal Walker	Uncredited	
1952	Deadline – U.S.A.	Copyboy	Richard Brooks	Uncredited	
1952	Has Anybody Seen My Gal	Youth at Soda Fountain	Douglas Sirk	Uncredited	
1953	Trouble Along the Way	Football Spectator	Michael Curtiz	Uncredited	
1955	East of Eden	Cal Trask	Elia Kazan	Lead film debut	
1955	Rebel Without a Cause	Jim Stark	Nicholas Ray	Released posthumously	
1956	Giant	Jett Rink	George Stevens	Filmed in 1955; released posthumously. Final role.	

=== Television ===
Year	Title	Role	Notes	Ref.
1951	Family Theater	John the Apostle	Episode: "Hill Number One: A Story of Faith and Inspiration"	
1951	The Bigelow Theatre	Hank	Episode: "T.K.O."	
1951	The Stu Erwin Show	Randy	Episode: "Jackie Knows All"	
1952	CBS Television Workshop	G.I.	Episode: "Into the Valley"	
1952	Hallmark Hall of Fame	Bradford	Episode: "Forgotten Children"	
1952	The Web	Himself	Episode: "Sleeping Dogs"	
1952–1953	Kraft Television Theatre	Various Characters	Episodes: "Prologue to Glory", "Keep Our Honor Bright" and "A Long Time Till Dawn"	
1952–1955	Lux Video Theatre	Various Characters	Episodes: "The Foggy, Foggy Dew" and "The Life of Emile Zola"	
1953	The Kate Smith Hour	The Messenger	Episode: "The Hound of Heaven"	
1953	You Are There	Robert Ford	Episode: "The Capture of Jesse James"	
1953	Treasury Men in Action	Various Characters	Episodes: "The Case of the Watchful Dog" and "The Case of the Sawed-Off Shotgun"	
1953	Tales of Tomorrow	Ralph	Episode: "The Evil Within"	
1953	Westinghouse Studio One	Various Characters	Episodes: "Ten Thousand Horses Singing", "Abraham Lincoln" and "Sentence of Death"	
1953	The Big Story	Rex Newman	Episode: "Rex Newman, Reporter for the Globe and News"	
1953	Omnibus	Bronco Evans	Episode: "Glory in the Flower". Features the song "Crazy Man, Crazy".	
1953	Campbell Summer Soundstage	Various Characters	Episodes: "Something for an Empty Briefcase" and "Life Sentence"	
1953	Armstrong Circle Theatre	Joey Frasier	Episode: "The Bells of Cockaigne"	
1953	Robert Montgomery Presents	Paul Zalinka	Episode: "Harvest"	
1953–1954	Danger	Various Characters	Episodes: "No Room", "Death Is My Neighbor", "The Little Woman" and "Padlocks"	
1954	The Philco Television Playhouse	Rob	Episode: "Run Like a Thief"	
1954	General Electric Theater	Various Characters	Episodes: "I'm a Fool" and "The Dark, Dark Hours"	
1955	The United States Steel Hour	Fernand Lagarde	Episode: "The Thief"	
1955	Schlitz Playhouse of Stars	Jeffrey Latham	Episode: "The Unlighted Road"	

=== Broadway ===
- See the Jaguar (1952)
- The Immoralist (1954) – based on the novel of the same name by André Gide

=== Off-Broadway ===
- The Metamorphosis (1952) – based on the novella by Franz Kafka
- The Scarecrow (1954)
- Women of Trachis (1954) – translation by Ezra Pound

== Awards and nominations ==
List of awards and nominations received by James Dean
Year	Award	Category	Nominated work	Result	Note	Ref.
1956	Academy Awards	Best Actor	East of Eden	Nominated	Posthumously	
1956	British Academy Film Awards	Best Foreign Actor	East of Eden	Nominated		
1956	Golden Globe Awards	Special Achievement Award for Best Dramatic Actor	East of Eden	Honored		
1956	Jussi Awards	Best Foreign Actor	East of Eden	Won		
1957	Academy Awards	Best Actor	Giant	Nominated	Posthumously	
1957	Bravo Otto	Best Actor	—N/a	Won		
1957	British Academy Film Awards	Best Foreign Actor	Rebel Without a Cause	Nominated		
1957	Golden Globe Awards	World Film Favorite - Male	—N/a	Honored		
1999	American Film Institute 100 Years...100 Stars 50 Greatest Screen Legends	Male Legend	—N/a	Honored as No.18		

=== Other honor ===
- On February 8, 1960, Dean was posthumously inducted into the Hollywood Walk of Fame with a motion-picture star at 1719 Vine Street.

== Biographical films ==
- The James Dean Story (1957), a documentary directed by Robert Altman, featuring photographs and video clips, including his public service announcement for safe driving from Warner Bros. Presents.
- James Dean Remembered (1974), a television film, highlights significant moments from Dean's career in film and television and features interviews with Sammy Davis Jr., Natalie Wood, Sal Mineo, and Leonard Rosenman.
- James Dean (1976), also known as James Dean: Portrait of a Friend, starring Stephen McHattie as Dean and Michael Brandon as writer William Bast.
- James Dean: The First American Teenager (1976), a television biography documentary that includes interviews with Sal Mineo, Natalie Wood, and Nicholas Ray.
- September 30, 1955 (1977), a film starring Richard Thomas as a teenager who idolizes Dean and grieves his death; co-starring Susan Tyrrell and Tom Hulce.
- Come Back to the 5 & Dime, Jimmy Dean, Jimmy Dean (1982), a film about an all-female James Dean fan club reunion, starring Sandy Dennis, Cher, Karen Black, and Kathy Bates.
- Forever James Dean (1988), Warner Home Video (1995).
- James Dean: The Final Day (1991) features interviews with William Bast, Liz Sheridan, and Maila Nurmi. Dean's bisexuality is openly discussed. Episode of Naked Hollywood television miniseries produced by The Oxford Film Company in association with the BBC, aired in the United States on the A&E Network.
- James Dean: Race with Destiny (1997), starring Casper Van Dien as Dean.
- James Dean (2001), TV biographical film starring James Franco as Dean.
- James Dean – Outside the Lines (2002), episode of Biography, an American television documentary includes interviews with Rod Steiger, William Bast, and Martin Landau.
- Living Famously: James Dean (2003, 2006), an Australian television biography, includes interviews with Martin Landau, Betsy Palmer, William Bast, and Bob Hinkle.
- James Dean – Kleiner Prinz, Little Bastard aka James Dean – Little Prince, Little Bastard (2005), German television biography, includes interviews with William Bast, Marcus Winslow Jr., and Robert Heller.
- James Dean: Forever Young (2005), narrated by Martin Sheen.
- Sense Memories (PBS American Masters television biography) (2005), features interviews with Martin Landau, Eartha Kitt, Mark Rydell, and Lois Smith.
- James Dean – Mit Vollgas durchs Leben (2005), Austrian television biography includes interviews with Rolf Wütherich and William Bast.
- Two Friendly Ghosts (2012), a short film starring Cole Carson as Dean.
- Joshua Tree, 1951: A Portrait of James Dean (2012), with James Preston as Dean.
- Life (2015), starring Dane DeHaan as Dean and Robert Pattinson as photographer Dennis Stock.

== See also ==
- List of oldest and youngest Academy Award winners and nominees – Youngest nominees for Best Lead Actor
- List of LGBTQ Academy Award winners and nominees – Best Lead Actor nominees alleged to be LGBTQ
- List of actors with Academy Award nominations
- List of actors with more than one Academy Award nomination in the acting categories
- List of posthumous Academy Award winners and nominees
- List of Academy Award records
