= Christmas Greetings (album) =

Studio album by Bing Crosby
- Released: Original 78 album: 1949; Original LP album: 1949
- Recorded: 1949
- Genre: Christmas
- Length: 18:39 (78rpm album); 24:31 (10" album)
- Label: Decca

Bing Crosby chronology
South Pacific (1949)	Christmas Greetings (1949)	Ichabod – The Legend of Sleepy Hollow (1949)

Christmas Greetings is the tenth solo studio album by American singer and actor Bing Crosby, released in 1949 as a Phonograph record, featuring popular Christmas songs.

== Background ==
Crosby had recorded Christmas songs for the first time in 1935 and he had a huge hit with "Silent Night" that year. In 1942, he recorded "White Christmas" with the John Scott Trotter Orchestra and the Ken Darby Singers for Decca Records in just 18 minutes on May 29, 1942, and it was released on July 30 as part of an album of six 78-rpm discs from the film Holiday Inn. In 1943, he recorded three more songs with a holiday theme – "Jingle Bells", "Santa Claus Is Comin' to Town", and "I'll Be Home for Christmas". All of these songs were huge hits and the issue of a 78 rpm set called Merry Christmas in 1945 firmly cemented Crosby’s association with the Christmas season. The Merry Christmas album has been available in one form or another ever since 1945 and in 1949 Decca decided to issue the Christmas Greetings album to complement this.

== Reception ==
Billboard reviewed the album saying: "Crosby single-handed has something of a corner on the Christmas market with his 'Merry Christmas' album and 'White Christmas'. This new album should widen that corner even more, for Bing is at his best and has the benefit of some top-notch support in the disposition of this collection of a couple of new seasonal pops and a group of familiar carols. A top-notch seasonal package which should stand out head-and-shoulders in sales over most any other new Christmas entry."

The album peaked at No. 4 in Billboard's best-selling albums chart for the week ending December 30, 1949. His Merry Christmas album was in first place.

== Track listing ==
The songs were featured on a 3-disc, 78 rpm album set, Decca Album A-715.

Disc 1: (24658)

1. "Here Comes Santa Claus",.
2. "Twelve Days of Christmas",

Disc 2: (24659)

3. "You're All I Want for Christmas",
4. "The First Nowell",

Disc 3: (24670)

5. "Christmas Carols - Part I", (Deck the Halls, Away in a Manger, I Saw Three Ships),
6. "Christmas Carols - Part ll", (Good King Wenceslas, We Three Kings of Orient Are, Angels We Have Heard on High),

=== LP track listing ===
The 1949 10-inch LP album issue Decca DL 5020 consisted of Decca A-715 (details above) plus two additional songs "The Christmas Song" and "O Fir Tree Dark".

Side one
No.	Title	Writer(s)	Performed with	Length
1.	"Here Comes Santa Claus" (May 10, 1949)	Gene Autry, Oakley Haldeman	The Andrews Sisters and Vic Schoen and His Orchestra	3:00
2.	"Twelve Days of Christmas" (May 10, 1949)	Frederic Austin	The Andrews Sisters and Vic Schoen and His Orchestra	3:21
3.	"You're All I Want for Christmas" (May 11, 1949)	Seger Ellis, Glenn Moore	Victor Young and His Orchestra, and the Ken Lane Singers	3:08
4.	"The First Nowell" (May 11, 1949)	Traditional	Victor Young and His Orchestra, and the Ken Lane Singers	2:31

Side two
No.	Title	Writer(s)	Performed with	Length
1.	"Christmas Carols - Part I": "Deck the Halls" " Away in a Manger" "I Saw Three Ships" (May 31, 1949)	Thomas Oliphant; William J. Kirkpatrick, James Ramsey Murray; Traditional	Simon Rady and His Orchestra and choir	3:22
2.	"Christmas Carols - Part ll": "Good King Wenceslas" "We Three Kings of Orient Are" "Angels We Have Heard on High" (May 31, 1949)	John Mason Neale; John Henry Hopkins Jr. James Chadwick	Simon Rady and His Orchestra and choir	3:17
3.	"The Christmas Song" (March 19, 1947)	Robert Wells, Mel Tormé	John Scott Trotter and His Orchestra, and the Ken Darby Singers	2:52
4.	"O Fir Tree Dark" (March 28, 1947)	N. F. S. Grundtvig, Carl Christian Nicolaj Balle	Victor Young and His Orchestra, and the Ken Darby Singers	3:00

=== 45 rpm releases ===
The album was also issued as catalog number 9-66 in the form of three 45 rpm vinyl discs in 1950 with identical tracks to the 78 rpm release A-715. Subsequently, it was issued on two EP records numbered ED 561 which included the two extra songs on the 10-inch LP.
