= Ichabod – The Legend of Sleepy Hollow =

Studio album by Bing Crosby
- Released: Original 78 album: 1949; Original LP album: 1949
- Recorded: June 23, 1949
- Genre: Children's
- Length: 13:09
- Label: Decca

Bing Crosby chronology
Christmas Greetings (1949)	Ichabod – The Legend of Sleepy Hollow (1949)	Top o' the Morning / Emperor Waltz (1950)

Ichabod – The Legend of Sleepy Hollow is the eleventh solo studio album by American singer and actor Bing Crosby released in 1949 as a Phonograph record, narrating the famous 1820 Washington Irving short story "The Legend of Sleepy Hollow."

== Background ==
Crosby had recorded the soundtrack for the "Ichabod" portion of the Walt Disney animated feature The Adventures of Ichabod and Mr. Toad, which premiered in October 1949, and he recorded the story separately for Decca Records on June 23, 1949. The songs were written by Don Raye and Gene De Paul. Simon Rady was the director and Victor Young and His Orchestra provided the musical support.

== Reception ==
Billboard reviewed the album, saying:

Combination of familiar elements should eliminate any sales-resistance to this package. There's Bing, Disney, Washington Irving, even a Victor Young score. As an actual kiddie special, the material doesn't match the Mr. Toad portion from the same cartoon feature. But for older children, this breezy, hip adaptation, and Bing's ditto projection should prove thoroughly winning. Portions of the songs are woven in, and adults too will find plenty of entertainment here. The package itself is attractive, and pictures together with portions of the tale are inside the folder. Also available as one side of an LP disking. Retail rating 86.

== Track listing ==
All songs were recorded on June 23, 1949, written by Don Raye and Gene De Paul, directed by Simon Rady and featuring Victor Young and His Orchestra. The songs were featured on a 2-disc, 78 rpm album set, Decca Album DAU-725 which was auto-coupled for ease of playing with a record changer.

Side	Title	Time
Disc 1: (40090)
A.	"Ichabod" (Pt. 1) (includes song "Ichabod")	3:11
B.	"Ichabod" (Pt. 2) (includes song "Ichabod")	3:23
Disc 2: (40091)
A.	"Ichabod" (Pt. 3) (includes song "Katrina")	3:15
B.	"Ichabod" (Pt. 4) (includes song "The Headless Horseman")	3:20

== LP issue ==
The 1949 10" LP album issue Decca DL 6001 consisted of DAU-725 (details above) on one side plus "Rip Van Winkle" narrated by Walter Huston on the other. "Rip Van Winkle" was originally recorded on August 16, 1945 and issued as a 2-disc 78 rpm album No. DA-432 (with the records numbered 40003–4). The running time was 12 minutes 14 seconds and the music was supplied by Wilbur Hatch and His Orchestra. The directors were Jerome Lawrence and Robert Edwin Lee.
