= Bing Crosby Sings Songs by George Gershwin =

Compilation album by Bing Crosby
- Released: 1949
- Recorded: 1936, 1938, 1939, 1947
- Genre: Popular
- Length: 23:33
- Label: Decca Records

Bing Crosby chronology
A Connecticut Yankee in King Arthur's Court (1949)	Bing Crosby Sings Songs by George Gershwin (1949)	South Pacific (1949)

Bing Crosby Sings Songs by George Gershwin is a compilation album of phonograph records by Bing Crosby released in 1949 featuring songs written by George Gershwin.

== Reception ==
Billboard was enthusiastic:

Crosby singing Gershwin tunes figures to be a winning parlay any time – and this album sounds like a winner, sure enough. Sides were made during recent various years, and it’s nice to be able to report that Croz was in form on each. Every tune here is a 20-carat imperishable, and plenty of earnest affection is lavished on each by Bing and the works of Trotter, Malneck and Victor Young.

== Track listing ==
=== 78rpm album ===
These previously issued songs were featured in a 4-disc, 78 rpm album set, Decca Album A-702. All music by George Gershwin.

Side	Title	Recording date	Lyricist	Performed with	Time
Disc 1: (24541)
A.	"Embraceable You"	November 12, 1947	Ira Gershwin	The Chickadees and John Scott Trotter and His Orchestra	2:47
B.	"They Can't Take That Away from Me"	November 12, 1947	Ira Gershwin	John Scott Trotter and His Orchestra	3:07
Disc 2: (24542)
A.	"Love Walked In"	November 12, 1947	Ira Gershwin	John Scott Trotter and His Orchestra	2:45
B.	"Summertime"	July 8, 1938	DuBose Heyward	Matty Malneck and His Orchestra	3:05
Disc 3: (25409)
A.	"It Ain't Necessarily So"	March 29, 1936	Ira Gershwin	Victor Young and His Orchestra	3:06
B.	"I Got Plenty o' Nuttin'"	March 29, 1936	DuBose Heyward	Victor Young and His Orchestra	3:15
Disc 4: (25410)
A.	"Somebody Loves Me"	June 14, 1939	Ballard MacDonald, Buddy DeSylva	Victor Young and His Orchestra	2:44
B.	"Maybe"	June 14, 1939	Ira Gershwin	Victor Young and His Orchestra	2:44

=== LP release ===
The songs were also featured on a 10-inch LP album, Decca DL 5081 issued in 1949. Side 1

1. "Embraceable You"
2. "They Can't Take That Away from Me"
3. "Love Walked In"
4. "Summertime"

Side 2

5. "It Ain't Necessarily So"
6. "I Got Plenty o' Nuttin'"
7. "Somebody Loves Me"
8. "Maybe"

=== Other releases ===
In 1950, the same selections were released on a set of 45 rpm records numbered Decca 9-122 and the album cover is shown above.
