= A Connecticut Yankee in King Arthur's Court (album) =

Songs from Mark Twain's A Connecticut Yankee in King Arthur's Court

Studio album by Bing Crosby
- Released: 1949
- Recorded: December 18–27, 1947
- Genre: Popular
- Length: 18:16
- Label: Decca

Bing Crosby chronology
Bing Crosby Sings Cole Porter Songs (1949)	Songs from Mark Twain's A Connecticut Yankee in King Arthur's Court (1949)	Bing Crosby Sings Songs by George Gershwin (1949)

A Connecticut Yankee in King Arthur's Court is the ninth solo studio album by American singer and actor Bing Crosby, released in 1949 as a Phonograph record of Crosby and other stars of the Paramount movie A Connecticut Yankee in King Arthur's Court featuring songs from the film. All of the songs were written by Jimmy Van Heusen and Johnny Burke.

== Reception ==
Billboard liked the album, saying:

Crosby's in rare form for this album of tunes from the Connecticut Yankee flick. His work on the top ballad "Once" is more reminiscent of the Bing of the thirties than anything he's done in a long while – and the song is a natural. (It's done twice here – one by Bing as a solo and again as a reprise with Rhonda Fleming). Other tune to watch is "Stub," which could have the makings of another "Swing on a Star". Also represented from the original cast are Murvyn Vye, Bill Bendix and Cedric Hardwicke. If picture is as big as advance word has it, then album is in.

The album reached the No. 5 position in Billboard's album charts.

== Track listing ==
These newly issued songs were featured in a 3-disc, 78 rpm album set, Decca Album A-699.

Side	Title	Recording date	Performed by	Time
Disc 1 (24524):
A.	"Once and for Always"	December 27, 1947	Bing Crosby with the Ken Darby Singers and Victor Young and His Orchestra.	2:54
B.	"If You Stub Your Toe on the Moon"	December 27, 1947	Bing Crosby with The Rhythmaires and Victor Young and His Orchestra.	3:06
Disc 2 (24525):
A.	"Busy Doing Nothing"	December 27, 1947	Bing Crosby with Cedric Hardwicke, William Bendix and Victor Young and His Orchestra.	3:02
B.	"'Twixt Myself and Me"*	December 18, 1947	Murvyn Vye with Victor Young and His Orchestra.	3:00
Disc 3 (24526):
A.	"Once and for Always"	December 18, 1947	Bing Crosby and Rhonda Fleming with Victor Young and His Orchestra.	3:09
B.	"When Is Sometime"	December 18, 1947	Rhonda Fleming with Victor Young and His Orchestra.	3:05

* This song was cut from the film after its world premiere at Radio City Music Hall, New York.

== Other releases ==
Decca included all the Crosby songs on Decca DL 4261 in 1962 for the LP set Bing's Hollywood.
