= Black Horse Canyon =

1954 film by Jesse Hibbs

- Theatrical release poster
- Directed by: Jesse Hibbs
- Screenplay by: Daniel Mainwaring; David Lang
- Based on: The Wild Horse by Les Savage Jr.
- Produced by: John W. Rogers
- Starring: Joel McCrea; Mari Blanchard; Race Gentry; Murvyn Vye; Irving Bacon; John Pickard
- Cinematography: George Robinson
- Edited by: Frank Gross
- Production company: Universal Pictures
- Distributed by: Universal Pictures
- Release date: June 1954
- Running time: 81 minutes
- Country: United States
- Language: English
- Box office: $1 million

Black Horse Canyon is a 1954 American Western film directed by Jesse Hibbs and written by Daniel Mainwaring and David Lang. It is based on the 1950 novel The Wild Horse by Les Savage Jr.. The film stars Joel McCrea, Mari Blanchard, Race Gentry, Murvyn Vye, Irving Bacon and John Pickard. The film was released in June 1954, by Universal Pictures.

== Plot ==
Two ranchers help a woman and her uncle catch and break a wild black stallion.

== Cast ==
- Joel McCrea as Del "Rock" Rockwell
- Mari Blanchard as Aldis Spain
- Race Gentry as Ti Taylor
- Murvyn Vye as Jennings
- Irving Bacon as Doc
- John Pickard as Duke
- Ewing Mitchell as Sheriff
- Pilar Del Rey as Juanita

== Production ==
This was filmed in and around Douglas, Arizona.
