= A Connecticut Yankee =

Connecticut Yankee or A Connecticut Yankee may refer to:

- A Connecticut Yankee in King Arthur's Court, an 1889 novel by Mark Twain
  - A Connecticut Yankee (musical), a Broadway musical based on the novel
  - A Connecticut Yankee (film), a 1931 sound film adaptation of the novel

== See also ==
- A Connecticut Yankee in King Arthur's Court (disambiguation)
- Connecticut Yankee (disambiguation)
