= South Pacific (Decca album) =

Compilation album by Bing Crosby
- Released: Original 78 album: 1949
- Recorded: 1949
- Genre: Popular
- Length: 21:36
- Label: Decca

Bing Crosby chronology
Bing Crosby Sings Songs by George Gershwin (1949)	South Pacific (1949)	Christmas Greetings (1949)

South Pacific is a compilation album of phonograph records by Bing Crosby, Danny Kaye, Ella Fitzgerald and Evelyn Knight released in 1949 featuring songs from the Rodgers and Hammerstein musical, South Pacific. The album was placed 8th in Billboard's chart of best-selling popular record albums in July 1949.

== Track listing ==
The songs were featured on a 4-disc, 78 rpm album set, Decca Album A-714. All music by Richard Rodgers; all lyrics by Oscar Hammerstein II.

Side	Title	Time
Disc 1 (24609): recorded March 10, 1949, Bing Crosby with John Scott Trotter and His Orchestra
A.	"Bali Ha'i"	3:21
B.	"Some Enchanted Evening"	3:05
Disc 2 (24637): recorded April 18, 1949, Danny Kaye with Gordon Jenkins and His Orchestra
A.	"There Is Nothing Like a Dame"	3:15
B.	"Honey Bun"	2:53
Disc 3 (24640): recorded April 25, 1949, Evelyn Knight with Victor Young and His Orchestra.
A.	"A Wonderful Guy"	3:01
B.	"A Cock-Eyed Optimist"	3:08
Disc 4 (24639): recorded April 27, 1949, Ella Fitzgerald with Gordon Jenkins and His Orchestra.
A.	"I'm Gonna Wash That Man Right Outa My Hair"	2:59
B.	"Happy Talk"	3:15

== LP release ==
The songs from the album were subsequently released on a 10" vinyl long-playing record (DL 5207) in 1951 and the LP achieved 10th. position in the album charts.
