= Bing Crosby Sings Cole Porter Songs =

Compilation album by Bing Crosby
- Released: 1949
- Recorded: 1936–1947
- Genre: Popular
- Length: 20:03
- Label: Decca

Bing Crosby chronology
Auld Lang Syne (1948)	Bing Crosby Sings Cole Porter Songs (1949)	A Connecticut Yankee in King Arthur's Court (1949)

Bing Crosby Sings Cole Porter Songs is a Decca Records studio 78 rpm album of phonograph records by Bing Crosby featuring the songs of Cole Porter.

== Background ==
Bing Crosby had enjoyed unprecedented success during the 1940s with his discography showing six No. 1 hits in 1944 alone. His films such as Going My Way and The Bells of St. Mary's were huge successes as were the Road films he made with Bob Hope. On radio, his Kraft Music Hall and Philco Radio Time shows were very popular. Decca Records built on this by issuing a number of 78rpm album sets, some featuring freshly recorded material and others utilizing Crosby's back catalogue. Ten of these sets were released in 1946, nine in 1947 and eleven more in 1948.
Bing Crosby Sings Cole Porter Songs includes several songs which had already enjoyed chart success. "I Love You" was a No. 1 hit in 1944 and "Night and Day" charted as well.

== Reception ==
Billboard reviewed the album, saying:

"Crosby singing Porter standards is calculated to be a sure-fire formula, and this album will doubtless enjoy a good sale. Sides were all cut in recent years, however, and some of them aren't top calibre for the Groaner. However, the incomparable Crosby intelligence and projection are there, even if the voice sometimes isn't, and his interpretations are impressive. This is his second album of Porter tunes, but the selection is fine, with all the ditties familiar favorites, with the possible exception of 'I Never Realized'. Subdued and competent backgrounds by John Scott Trotter. Retail rating 80."

== Track listing ==
These songs were featured on a four-disc, 78 rpm album set, Decca Album No. A-691. All songs were written by Cole Porter and feature John Scott Trotter and His Orchestra, except "I Never Realized", written by Cole Porter and Melville Gideon and featuring Victor Young and His Orchestra.

Side	Title	Recording date	Time
Disc 1 (23972):
A.	"Begin the Beguine"	May 3, 1944	3:32
B.	"Night and Day"	February 11, 1944	3:10
Disc 2 (24201):
A.	"I've Got You Under My Skin"	December 24, 1947	2:56
B.	"Easy to Love"	December 24, 1947	2:20
Disc 3 (25400):
A.	"Just One of Those Things"	January 21, 1945	3:09
B.	"I Love You"	February 11, 1944	2:35
Disc 4 (24202):
A.	"Rosalie"	December 3, 1947	2:21
B.	"I Never Realized"	August 10, 1936	2:40

== LP release ==
The songs were also featured on a 10-inch LP album, Decca DL 5064 issued in 1949.

Track listing

Side 1

1. "Begin the Beguine"
2. "Night and Day"
3. "I've Got You Under My Skin"
4. “Easy to Love”

Side 2

5. "Just One of Those Things”
6. "I Love You”
7. "Rosalie”
8. "I Never Realized"
