= Connecticut Yankee =

Connecticut Yankee may refer to:

- Connecticut Yankee Council
- Connecticut Yankee Nuclear Power Plant, a nuclear power plant in Connecticut
- Connecticut Yankee (train), a 1936-1995 train of New York, New Haven and Hartford Railroad and Boston and Maine and other companies that at peak ran between New York and Quebec City

Connecticut Yankees may refer to:

- Connecticut Yankees (soccer), a soccer team based in Hartford, Connecticut from 1972 to 1978
- Connecticut Yankees RFC, a rugby union team based in Norwalk, Connecticut
- Rudy Vallée and the Connecticut Yankees, band led by Rudy Vallée

== See also ==
- A Connecticut Yankee (disambiguation)
