= A Connecticut Yankee in King Arthur's Court (1949 film) =

1949 film adaptation of the novel

- Theatrical release poster
- Directed by: Tay Garnett
- Written by: Edmund Beloin
- Based on: A Connecticut Yankee in King Arthur's Court; 1889 novel by Mark Twain
- Produced by: Robert Fellows
- Starring: Bing Crosby; Rhonda Fleming; Sir Cedric Hardwicke; William Bendix
- Cinematography: Ray Rennahan
- Edited by: Archie Marshek
- Music by: Victor Young, Jimmy Van Heusen (songs)
- Color process: Technicolor
- Distributed by: Paramount Pictures
- Release dates: April 7, 1949 (New York City); April 22, 1949 (U.S.)
- Running time: 106 minutes
- Country: United States
- Language: English
- Budget: $3.4 million
- Box office: $3 million

A Connecticut Yankee in King Arthur's Court is a 1949 American comedy musical film directed by Tay Garnett and starring Bing Crosby, Rhonda Fleming, Sir Cedric Hardwicke and William Bendix.

Based on the novel A Connecticut Yankee in King Arthur's Court (1889) by Mark Twain, the film is about a mechanic in 1912 who bumps his head and finds himself in Arthurian Britain in 528, where he is befriended by a knight and gains power by judicious use of technology. When he falls in love with the king's niece, her fiancé Sir Lancelot takes exception, and when he meddles in the politics of the kingdom, trouble ensues.

Filmed from October to December 1947, A Connecticut Yankee in King Arthur's Court was released on April 22, 1949, and distributed by Paramount Pictures. The film was a popular success and became one of the highlight films of 1949.

== Plot ==
American mechanic Hank Martin is knocked unconscious and awakens in the land and time of King Arthur. Initially captured and sentenced to die, he is freed and claims to be a wizard, awing the aged king and his court with the lighting of a match. Arthur rewards him with a blacksmith shop, a squire and the title of Sir Boss.

Hank begins introducing modern flourishes such as jazz music, safety pins, firearms and simple machinery as he attempts to romance the very beautiful Alisande la Carteloise and to start a friendship with Sir Sagramore.

Hank's actions incur the hatred of both Merlin and Morgan le Fay. Sir Lancelot returns early from a quest to confront Hank regarding Alisande, and the men joust. Although Hank humiliates Sir Lancelot, he loses Alisande because of his dishonor.

A young girl, having heard Hank is a great wizard, implores him to save her ill father. The man dies and Hank learns from the girl's widowed mother about injustices the family has faced because of medieval laws. This inspires Hank to visit King Arthur, persuading him to tour his kingdom in disguise and see the wretched condition of his subjects. While the king is away, Merlin and Morgan plot to usurp his throne, and Hank, Sir Sagamore and King Arthur are captured and sold as slaves to Merlin. Alisande, learning of their plight, attempts to help them but is also captured. While in captivity, she admits her love for Hank. She is taken by Merlin and the others are sent to be executed.

Prior knowledge of an eclipse allows Hank to strike fear in his captors, resulting in release of the captives. When Hank rushes to save Alisande from Merlin's clutches, he is shot and returned to his own time.

Heartsick over losing the woman whom he loves, Hank tours a British castle. Its owner, Lord Pendragon, sends him to see his niece, who bears a striking resemblance to Alisande.

== Cast ==
- Bing Crosby as Hank Martin/Sir Boss
- Rhonda Fleming as Alisande la Carteloise
- Sir Cedric Hardwicke as Lord Pendragon/King Arthur
- William Bendix as Sir Sagramore
- Murvyn Vye as Merlin
- Virginia Field as Morgan le Fay
- Joseph Vitale as Sir Logris
- Henry Wilcoxon as Sir Lancelot
- Richard Webb as Sir Galahad
- Alan Napier as High Executioner
- Charles Coleman as Richard (uncredited)
- Olin Howland as Sam (uncredited)
- Gordon Richards as Tour Guide (uncredited)
- Ann Carter as Peasant Girl

== Production ==
The film soundtrack was composed by Jimmy Van Heusen with lyrics by Johnny Burke. The orchestral score was written by longtime Paramount staff composer Victor Young, who also conducted the orchestra for many of Crosby's Decca Records recordings.

- "If You Stub Your Toe on the Moon" by Bing Crosby
- "When Is Sometime" by Rhonda Fleming
- "Once and for Always" by Bing Crosby and Rhonda Fleming
- "Busy Doing Nothing" by Bing Crosby, William Bendix and Cedric Hardwicke
- "Once and for Always" (reprise) by Bing Crosby and Rhonda Fleming
- "Twixt Myself and Me" by Murvyn Vye (cut from the film after its world premiere)

The cast made separate recordings of the songs used in the film for Decca Records in December 1947 and the songs were issued as a 78-rpm album set. Crosby's songs were also included in the Bing's Hollywood series.

== Reception ==
The film opened on April 7, 1949 at Radio City Music Hall in New York City and, together with the venue's annual Easter pageant and stage show, generated its largest four-day Easter gross to date, with $146,000 in its first week. The following week, with children out of school and the theater opening at 7:45 a.m. to enable six showings a day, it grossed a Radio City Music Hall record of $170,000 and became the number-one film in the United States.

In a contemporary review, Bosley Crowther of The New York Times wrote:

The solid, reliable humors of Mark Twain’s "A Connecticut Yankee in King Arthur's Court," which have already done yeoman service in two films and a Broadway musical show, have been given another going over—with eminently satisfactory results—in Paramount’s new film of the same title ... And for this we can thank Bing Crosby, primarily and above all, because it is Bing in the role of the Yankee who gives this film its particular charm ... But it is still Bing’s delightful personality, his mild surprises and sweet serenities, and his casual way of handling dialogue that makes this burlesque a success. No one in current operation could qualify, we are sure, to play the Connecticut Yankee the way the old Groaner does. ... Mr. Crosby's "Connecticut Yankee" is that good time to be had by all.

Harrison's Reports also liked the film, calling it "A very good romantic comedy" with "numerous situations that will provoke hearty laughter." Edwin Schallert of the Los Angeles Times wrote: "All in all, I would put this picture well up among Paramount's Crosby features as an effort to accomplish something different ... It is a pleasantly fabulous excursion in the dream classification, and the cutback to the medieval past is effectively enough introduced in this adaptation of the Mark Twain story."

Variety was not quite so enthusiastic: "Picture wears the easy casualness that's a Crosby trademark, goes about its entertaining at a leisurely pace, and generally comes off satisfactorily. It's not high comedy and there’s little swashbuckling." Richard L. Coe of The Washington Post wrote that the idea was "so promising that it's a shame the picture collapses," explaining, "The early half of the picture accepts Bing's particular brand of easy charm ... But social welfare work among the downtrodden peasantry (there's even a scene that reminds you of 'Monsieur Vincent') hardly fits into my idea of cheerful musical comedy." John McCarten of The New Yorker wrote that Crosby was "effortlessly amiable," but that the film lacked the wit of the 1931 Will Rogers version and that the songs were inferior to those of the Rodgers and Hart stage musical.

In 2008, the American Film Institute nominated the film for its Top 10 Fantasy Films list.

== See also ==
- List of films featuring eclipses
