= Murvyn Vye =

American character actor (1913–1976)

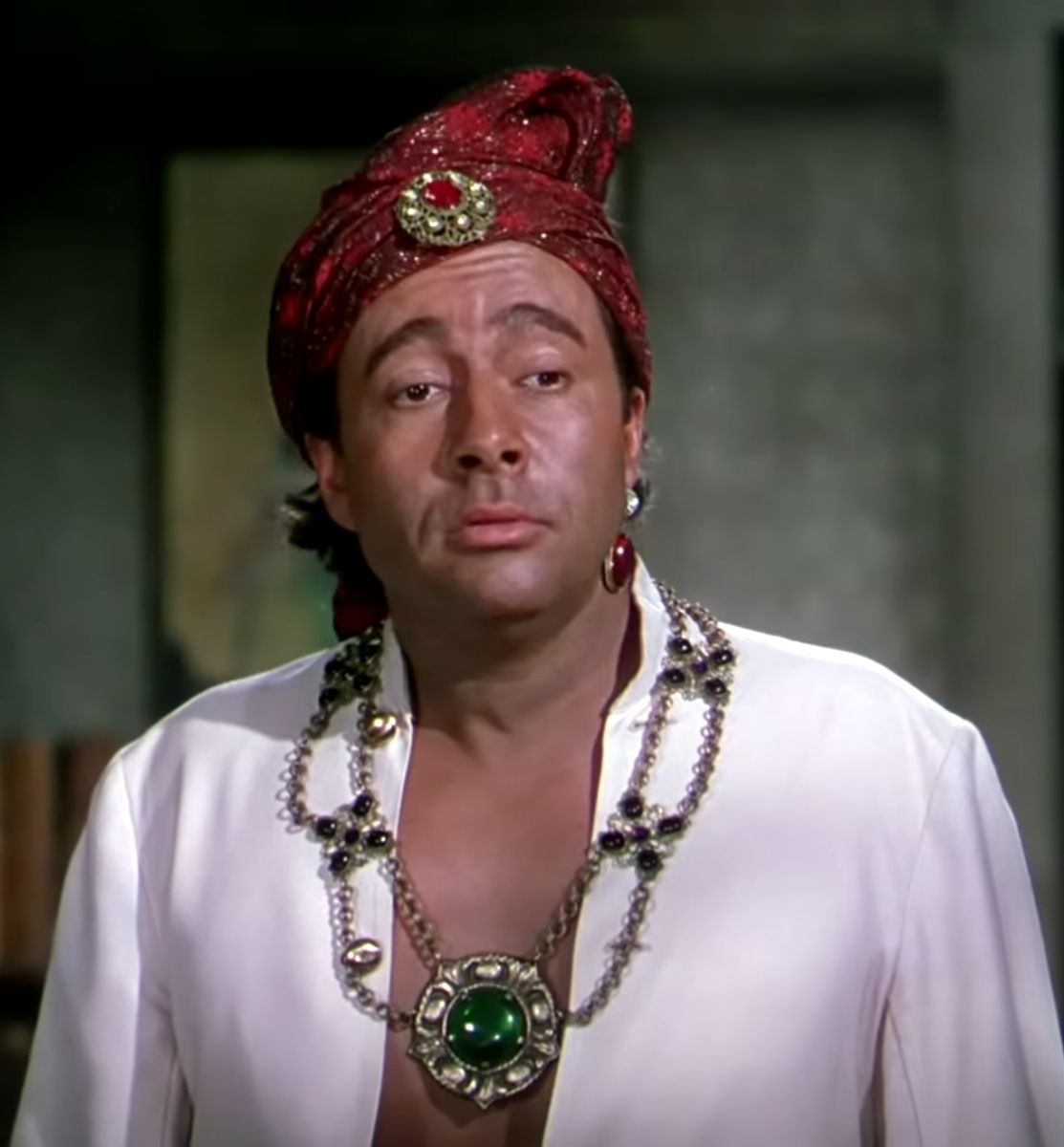
- Vye in Road to Bali (1952)
- Born: Marvin Wesley Vye Jr. July 15, 1913; Quincy, Massachusetts, U.S.
- Died: August 17, 1976 (aged 63); Pompano Beach, Florida, U.S.
- Occupation: Actor
- Years active: 1947–1967
- Known for: A Connecticut Yankee in King Arthur's Court; Al Capone
- Spouse: Patricia Savage (m. 1935; div. 1936)

Marvin Wesley Vye Jr. (July 15, 1913 – August 17, 1976) was an American character actor. He is best known for portraying Prince Ken Arok in the comedy film Road to Bali.

== Early years ==
Vye was born in Quincy, Massachusetts, and educated at Yale University.

== Career ==
Vye's first film was Golden Earrings (1947). He appeared in numerous films in the 1940s and 1950s, often in exotic roles. He portrayed a villainous Merlin the Magician in the 1949 Bing Crosby musical comedy, A Connecticut Yankee in King Arthur's Court, and the scheming Prince Arok in 1952's Road to Bali, a comedy co-starring Crosby and Bob Hope.

On Broadway, Vye debuted in Hamlet (1936). He also created the role of Jigger Cragin in the original production of Rodgers and Hammerstein's Carousel. Vye was also set to appear as the Kralaholme in the original production of The King and I, but as rehearsals went on he lost his only two musical numbers and left the show.

In 1958 Vye appeared as Virgie on the television western Tales of Wells Fargo in the episode titled "Butch Cassidy" and as Palmer in the episode "The Stunt Man" of the CBS situation comedy Mr. Adams and Eve.

In 1959, Vye portrayed gangster George "Bugs" Moran, rival of Chicago's top organized-crime figure, in Al Capone, which starred Rod Steiger in the title role.

He did guest-star appearances in many television series throughout the 1950s and 1960s, including Maverick, M Squad, The Untouchables, Bonanza, Bat Masterson, The Rifleman, Perry Mason, Wagon Train, The Beverly Hillbillies and The Lucy Show.

== Personal life ==
On April 7, 1935, Vye married Patricia Savage in Nashua, New Hampshire. On January 17, 1936, a judge in Boston granted her an uncontested divorce.

== Death ==
Vye died of natural causes on August 17, 1976, in a motel room in Pompano Beach, Florida at age 63.

== Partial filmography (as actor) ==
- Golden Earrings (1947) as Zoltan
- Whispering Smith (1948) as Blake Barton
- A Connecticut Yankee in King Arthur's Court (1949) as Merlin
- Pickup (1951) (uncredited)
- Assignment – Paris! (1952) as Medical Officer at Prisoner Exchange (uncredited)
- Road to Bali (1952) as Arok
- Destination Gobi (1953) as Kengtu
- Pickup on South Street (1953) as Capt. Dan Tiger
- River of No Return (1954) as Dave Colby
- Black Horse Canyon (1954) as Jennings
- Green Fire (1954) as El Moro
- Escape to Burma (1955) as Makesh
- Pearl of the South Pacific (1955) as Halemano
- Voodoo Island (1957) as Barney Finch
- This Could Be the Night (1957) as Waxie London
- Short Cut to Hell (1957) as Nichols
- The Walter Winchell File (1957, Episode: "The Law and Aaron Benjamin") as Zero
- Girl in the Woods (1958) as Whitlock
- In Love and War (1958) as Charlie Scanlon (uncredited)
- Rally Round the Flag, Boys! (1958) as Oscar Hoffa (uncredited)
- Al Capone (1959) as George 'Bugs' Moran
- The Boy and the Pirates (1960) as Blackbeard
- The Big Bankroll (1961) as Williams
- The George Raft Story (1961) as Johnny Fuller
- Andy (1965) as Bartender
