= 1932 in music =

This is a list of notable events in music that took place in the year 1932.

== Specific locations ==
- 1932 in British music
- 1932 in Norwegian music

== Specific genres ==
- 1932 in country music
- 1932 in jazz

== Events ==
- 1932 marks the lowest trough the recording industry experiences during the Great Depression. In the United States, revenues have dropped from 104 million units in 1927 to 6 million in 1932.
- January 14 – Maurice Ravel's Piano Concerto in G is premièred in Paris.
- February 3–9 – Duke Ellington and his Orchestra record two medleys for Victor at 33 1/3 rpm. Over half a century later it is discovered that two microphone-to-cutting table chains had been used, and that the session exists in "accidental stereo."
- March 15 – The BBC Dance Orchestra in the UK first broadcasts under the direction of Henry Hall.
- May 1 – The music to John Alden Carpenter's ballet Skyscrapers is recorded by the Victor Symphony Orchestra, under the direction of Nathaniel Shilkret; in addition to be being issued as six sides on 78 rpm discs, the recording is made available as one of Victor's early 33 1/3 rpm LP releases.
- July 1 – The very young Eddie Duchin and his Central Park Casino Orchestra, and the Three X Sisters (aka Hamilton Sisters & Fordyce), record "The Clouds Will Soon Roll By" for Columbia records.
- July 7 – Benny Carter's orchestra first records. Crown Records rejects all but one title, "Tell All You Daydreams to Me."
- August 15 – First successful electrical re-recording, directed by Nathaniel Shilkret, of an orchestral accompaniment of a Victor recording by Enrico Caruso.
- October 2 – Charles Seeger is divorced from his first wife, Constance de Clyver Edson. He subsequently marries composer Ruth Crawford.
- October 7 – The London Philharmonic Orchestra, recently founded by Thomas Beecham, gives its first public concert.
- October 13 – Isham Jones and the Three X Sisters record at New York Studio No.1. Several songs utilized for RCA Victor are labeled "experimental" as this blues era band-leader is fusing new arrangements, an idea that would later influence part of the Swing era.
- October 19 – Frankie Laine and Ruthie Smith set the all-time dance marathon record of 3,501 hours (145 days) at the Million Dollar Pier in Atlantic City, New Jersey.
- October 31 – Sergei Prokofiev's Piano Concerto No. 5 is premiered in Berlin.
- December 13 – Bennie Moten's Kansas City Orchestra make their last record date for Victor. It becomes a singular example of early swing music.
- Sydney Symphony established.

== Published popular music ==
- "After You, Who?" words and music by Cole Porter
- "Alone Together" words by Howard Dietz music by Arthur Schwartz
- "And Love Was Born" words by Oscar Hammerstein II, music by Jerome Kern
- "And So To Bed" words by Mack Gordon, music by Harry Revel
- "April in Paris" words by E. Y. Harburg, music by Vernon Duke
- "As You Desire Me" words and music by Allie Wrubel
- "Auf Wiedersehen, My Dear" words and music by Al Hoffman, Ed G. Nelson, Al Goodhart and Milton Ager
- "Bésame Mucho" words and music by Consuelo Velázquez
- "Between the Devil and the Deep Blue Sea" words by Ted Koehler, music by Harold Arlen
- "Dance Of The Cuckoos" words and music by T. Marvin Hatley and Harry Steinberg
- "Darkness On The Delta" words by Marty Symes and Al Neiburg, music by Jerry Livingston
- "Eadie Was A Lady" words by B. G. De Sylva, music by Richard Whiting and Nacio Herb Brown
- "Eres Tú" Miguel Sandoval
- "Fit As A Fiddle" words and music by Arthur Freed, Al Hoffman and Al Goodhart
- "The Flies Crawled Up The Window" words and music by Douglas Furber and Vivian Ellis
- "Give Her A Kiss" words by Lorenz Hart, music by Richard Rodgers
- "Goodnight My Love" words and music by Gus Arnheim, Harry Tobias and Jules Lemare
- "Goodnight Vienna" words and music by Holt Marvell and George Posford
- "Have You Ever Been Lonely?" words by Billy Hill (as George Brown) music by Peter De Rose
- "Here Lies Love" words by Leo Robin, music by Ralph Rainger
- "How Deep Is The Ocean?" words and music by Irving Berlin
- "I Don't Stand a Ghost of a Chance with You" words by Bing Crosby and Ned Washington, music by Victor Young
- "I Gotta Right To Sing The Blues" words by Ted Koehler, music by Harold Arlen
- "If It Ain't Love" words and music by Andy Razaf, Don Redman and Fats Waller
- "I'll Do My Best To Make You Happy" words and music by Ray Noble
- "I'll Never Be The Same" words by Gus Kahn, music by Matty Malneck and Frank Signorelli from the revue After Dinner
- "I'm Getting Sentimental Over You" words by Ned Washington, music by George Bassman
- "In A Shanty In Old Shanty Town" words by Joe Young, music by Ira Schuster and Jack Little
- "In Egern On The Tegern Sea" words by Oscar Hammerstein II, music by Jerome Kern. Introduced by Ivy Scott in the musical Music in the Air
- "Isn't It Romantic?" words by Lorenz Hart, music by Richard Rodgers
- "It Don't Mean A Thing (If It Ain't Got That Swing)" words by Irving Mills, music by Duke Ellington
- "It Was So Beautiful" words by Arthur Freed, music by Harry Barris
- "I've Got You On My Mind" words and music by Cole Porter
- "I've Told Every Little Star" words by Oscar Hammerstein II, music by Jerome Kern
- "Just An Echo In The Valley" words and music by Harry Woods, Jimmy Campbell and Reg Connelly
- "Keepin' Out of Mischief Now" words by Andy Razaf music by Fats Waller
- "Lawd, You Made The Night Too Long" words by Sam M. Lewis music by Isham Jones
- "Let's Call It A Day" words by Lew Brown, music by Ray Henderson
- "Let's Have Another Cup of Coffee" words and music by Irving Berlin
- "Let's Put Out The Lights And Go To Sleep" words and music by Herman Hupfeld
- "A Little Street Where Old Friends Meet" words by Gus Kahn, music by Harry Woods
- "Look What You've Done" words by Bert Kalmar and Irving Caesar, music by Harry Ruby and Harry Akst
- "Louisiana Hayride" words by Howard Dietz, music by Arthur Schwartz
- "Love Is The Sweetest Thing" words and music by Ray Noble
- "Love Me Tonight" words by Lorenz Hart, music by Richard Rodgers
- "Love Me Tonight" words and music by Bing Crosby, Ned Washington and Victor Young (not to be confused with the Rodgers and Hart song listed above)
- "Lover" words by Lorenz Hart, music by Richard Rodgers
- "Lullaby of the Leaves" words by Joe Young, music by Bernice Petkere
- "Mad About The Boy" words and music by Noël Coward
- "A Million Dreams" words by Gus Kahn, music by J. C. Lewis Jr
- "Mimi" words by Lorenz Hart, music by Richard Rodgers
- "Mine" words by Ira Gershwin, music by George Gershwin
- "Minnie The Moocher's Wedding Day" words by Ted Koehler, music by Harold Arlen
- "My Cousin in Milwaukee" words by Ira Gershwin, music by George Gershwin. Introduced by Lyda Roberti in the musical Pardon My English
- "Night And Day" words and music by Cole Porter introduced by Fred Astaire in Gay Divorce
- "Oh! That Mitzi" words by Leo Robin, music by Ralph Rainger. Introduced by Maurice Chevalier in the film One Hour with You.
- "Old Yazoo" words by Andy Razaf music by Fats Waller
- "One Hour With You" words by Leo Robin, music by Richard A. Whiting. From the film of the same name
- "Papirosn" words and music by Herman Yablokoff (written 1922)
- "The Party's Over Now" words and music by Noël Coward
- "Please" words by Leo Robin, music by Ralph Rainger
- "The Poor Apache" words by Lorenz Hart, music by Richard Rodgers
- "Precious Lord Take My Hand" by Thomas A. Dorsey, first major gospel music hit
- "Say It Isn't So" words and music by Irving Berlin
- "Sleep, Come On And Take Me" words and music by Joe Young and Boyd Bunch
- "Smoke Rings" words by Ned Washington music by Gene Gifford
- "Snuggled On Your Shoulder" words by Joe Young, music by Carmen Lombardo
- "So Do I" words by B. G. De Sylva, music by Vincent Youmans
- "Soft Lights And Sweet Music" words and music by Irving Berlin
- "Somebody Loves You" words by Charlie Tobias, music by Peter DeRose
- "The Song is You" words by Oscar Hammerstein II, music by Jerome Kern
- "Street of Dreams" words by Sam M. Lewis music by Victor Young
- "The Sun Has Got His Hat On" words and music by Ralph Butler and Noel Gay
- "Three's a Crowd" words by Al Dubin and Irving Kahal music by Harry Warren
- "Too Many Tears" words by Al Dubin, music by Harry Warren
- "Try a Little Tenderness" words and music by Harry Woods, Jimmy Campbell and Reg Connelly
- "Waltzing in a Dream" words by Ned Washington, Bing Crosby, music by Victor Young
- "What More Can I Ask?" words by A. E. Wilkins music by Ray Noble
- "What Would You Do?" words by Leo Robin, music by Richard A. Whiting. Introduced by Maurice Chevalier in the film One Hour with You
- "Willow Weep for Me" words and music by Ann Ronell
- "Wintergreen For President" words by Ira Gershwin, music by George Gershwin
- "You Are Too Beautiful" words by Lorenz Hart, music by Richard Rodgers
- "The Younger Generation" words and music by Noël Coward
- "You're An Old Smoothie" words and music by B. G. De Sylva, Richard A. Whiting and Nacio Herb Brown
- "You're Getting To Be A Habit With Me" words by Al Dubin, music by Harry Warren
- "You've Got What Gets Me" words by Ira Gershwin, music by George Gershwin

== Top popular recordings 1932 ==
1932 marked the lowest trough the recording industry would experience during the Great Depression, as the record industry struggled for its existence. Only Victor, ARC (which added Brunswick) and Columbia released records, and Columbia would be in bankruptcy by 1934. In the United States, revenues went from 104 million units in 1927 to 6 million in 1932, and did not start to rebound until 1937. The top selling records of 1929 ranged from $500,000 and up, fell under $100,000 in 1930, $60k in 1931 and $20k in 1932, where they stayed for several years. Keep this in mind when reviewing sales figures. You may also notice less artists and records. Record companies were afraid of taking more losses, such as gambling on new artists and new styles. Three of the six top selling 10" 78s were recorded by Jimmie Rodgers, who would die of Tuberculosis in May 1933. They can be found on the 1932 Country (Hillbilly) page.

The top popular records of 1932 listed below were compiled from Joel Whitburn's Pop Memories 1890–1954, record sales reported on the "Discography of American Historical Recordings" website, and other sources as specified. Numerical rankings are approximate, there were no Billboard charts in 1932, the numbers are only used for a frame of reference.

Rank	Artist	Title	Label	Recorded	Released	Chart positions
1	Ted Lewis and His Band	"In a Shanty in Old Shanty Town"	Columbia 2652-D	March 15, 1932	May 1932	US Billboard 1932 #1, US #1 for 10 weeks, 22 total weeks
2	Bing Crosby	"Please"	Brunswick 6394	September 16, 1932	October 1932	US Billboard 1932 #3, US #1 for 6 weeks, 16 total weeks
3	Leo Reisman and His Orchestra (vocal Frances Maddux)	"Paradise"	Victor 22904	December 28, 1931	January 13, 1932	US Billboard 1932 #2, US #1 for 6 weeks, 17 total weeks
4	Leo Reisman and His Orchestra	"The Night Was Made for Love"	Victor 22869	November 24, 1931	December 1931	US Billboard 1932 #4, US #10 for 1 week, 4 total weeks, 17,010 sales
5	Guy Lombardo and His Royal Canadians	"We Just Couldn't Say Goodbye"	Brunswick 6350	July 27, 1932	August 1932	US Billboard 1932 #5, US #1 for 5 weeks, 8 total weeks
6	Paul Whiteman and His Orchestra (vocal Mildred Bailey)	"All of Me"	Victor 22879	December 1, 1931	December 15, 1931	US Billboard 1932 #6, US #1 for 3 weeks, 10 total weeks, 12,161 sales
7	Louis Armstrong and His Orchestra	"All of Me"	Okeh 41552	January 27, 1932	February 1932	US Billboard 1932 #7, US #1 for 2 weeks, 18 total weeks, Grammy Hall of Fame 2005
8	Peter Van Steeden and His Orchestra	"Home"	Victor 22868	November 25, 1931	December 1931	US Billboard 1932 #8, US #2 for 3 weeks, 8 total weeks, 12,960 sales
9	Jimmie Rodgers	"Roll Along, Kentucky Moon"	Victor 23651	February 2, 1932	April 8, 1932	US Billboard 1932 #9, US #18 for 1 week, US Hillbilly 1932 #4, 12,448 sales
10	Ted Black and His Orchestra	"In a Shanty in Old Shanty Town"	Victor 24050	June 22, 1932	July 1932	US Billboard 1932 #10, US #2 for 2 weeks, 7 total weeks, 12,396 sales
11	Guy Lombardo and His Royal Canadians	"Paradise"	Brunswick 6290	April 14, 1932	April 1932	US Billboard 1932 #11, US #1 for 3 weeks, 10 total weeks
12	Bing Crosby	"Brother, Can You Spare a Dime?"	Brunswick 6414	October 25, 1932	November 1932	US Billboard 1932 #12, US #1 for 2 weeks, 10 total weeks, National Recording Registry 2013, Grammy Hall of Fame 2005
13	Paul Whiteman and His Orchestra (Vocal Ramona)	"Let's Put Out the Lights (and Go to Sleep)"	Victor 24140	September 26, 1932	October 1, 1932	US Billboard 1932 #13, US #2 for 1 week, 6 total weeks, 11,942 sales
14	Bing Crosby and The Mills Brothers	"Dinah"	Brunswick 6240	December 16, 1931	January 2, 1932	US Billboard 1932 #14, US #1 for 2 weeks, 10 total weeks
15	Bing Crosby with Isham Jones Orchestra	"Sweet Georgia Brown"	Brunswick 6320	April 23, 1932	May 1932	US Billboard 1932 #15, US #2 for 3 weeks, 10 total weeks
16	Kate Smith with Guy Lombardo and His Royal Canadians	"River Stay 'Way from My Door"	Columbia 2578	December 8, 1931	December 1931	US Billboard 1932 #16, US #1 for 2 weeks, 10 total weeks
17	George Olsen and His Music	"Lullaby of the Leaves"	Victor 22998	April 14, 1932	May 1, 1932	US Billboard 1932 #17, US #1 for 2 weeks, 10 total weeks, 11,101 sales
18	Guy Lombardo and His Royal Canadians	"Too Many Tears"	Brunswick 6261	January 16, 1932	February 15, 1932	US Billboard 1932 #18, US #1 for 2 weeks, 9 total weeks
19	George Olsen and His Music	"Say it Isn't So"	Victor 24124	September 2, 1932	September 1932	US Billboard 1932 #19, US #1 for 2 weeks, 9 total weeks, 10,870 sales
20	Rudy Vallee and His Connecticut Yankees	"Brother, Can You Spare a Dime?"	Columbia 2725-D	October 27, 1932	November 1932	US Billboard 1932 #20, US #1 for 2 weeks, 8 total weeks, National Recording Registry 2013
21	Jimmie Grier and the Cocoanut Grove Orchestra (vocal Donald Novis)	"One Hour with You"	Victor 22971	March 28, 1932	April 1932	US Billboard 1932 #21, US #2 for 3 weeks, 11 total weeks, 10,342 sales
22	Rudy Vallee and His Connecticut Yankees	I Guess I'll Have to Change My Plan	Columbia 2700-D	August 11, 1932	August 1932	US Billboard 1932 #22, US #2 for 3 weeks, 10 total weeks

== Top blues recordings ==
- "Worrying You Off My Mind" – Big Bill Broonzy
- "Mistreatin Mama" – Big Bill Broonzy
- "How You Want It Done" – Big Bill Broonzy
- "Searching the Desert For the Blues" – Blind Willie McTell
- "Winnie The Wailer" – Lonnie Johnson

== Classical music ==
- Henk Badings
  - Symphony for 16 soloists
  - Symphony No. 2
- Arnold Bax
  - Concerto for Cello and Orchestra
  - Sinfonietta
  - Sonata No. 4, for piano
  - Summer Music, for orchestra (revised version)
  - Symphony No. 5
  - "Watching the Needleboats", for voice and piano (text by James Joyce)
- Arthur Benjamin – Violin Concerto
- Marc Blitzstein
  - The Condemned, choral opera in one act
  - Serenade, for string quartet
- John Cage – Greek Ode, for voice and piano (text from Aeschylus' The Persians)
- Carlos Chávez
  - Antígona (incidental music for the adaptation by Jean Cocteau of the tragedy by Sophocles)
  - Caballos de vapor (H.P., sinfonía de baile)
  - String Quartet No. 2
  - Tierra mojada (for mixed choir, oboe, and cor anglais (text by R. López Velarde)
  - "Todo", for voice and piano (text by R. López Velarde)
- Henry Cowell
  - Expressivo, for piano
  - Four Continuations, for string orchestra
  - Reel (Lilt of the Reel), for small orchestra
  - Rhythm Study, for piano
  - Two Appositions, for piano
  - Two Appositions: One Movement for Orchestra
- Ruth Crawford Seeger
  - Ricercari (2), for voice and piano (text by H. T. Tsiang)
  - Songs (3), for alto voice, oboe, percussion, piano, and optional orchestra (texts by Carl Sandburg)
- Jean Françaix – Piano Concerto
- Gunnar de Frumerie – Variations and Fugue
- George Gershwin – Cuban Overture, for orchestra
- Peggy Glanville-Hicks
  - Fantasy, for solo violin
  - "He Reproves the Curlew", for voice and piano (text by William Butler Yeats)
  - Prelude for a Pensive Pupil, for piano
  - "Sheiling Song", for voice and piano (text by F. MacLeod)
  - "They Are Not Long", for voice and piano (text by Ernest Dowson)
  - "To the Moon", for voice and piano (text by Percy Bysshe Shelley)
  - "A Widow Bird", for voice and piano (text by Percy Bysshe Shelley)
- Percy Grainger – Handel in the Strand
- Camargo Guarnieri – String Quartet No. 1
- Alois Hába
  - Children's Choruses (5), in quarter tones, Op. 42 (texts by V. Nezval)
  - Children's Choruses, in quarter tones, Op. 43
  - Fantazie No. 2, for nonet, Op. 41
  - Pracující den, for male choir, in quarter tones, Op. 45 (text by J. Hora)
- Jascha Heifetz – arrangement of Grigoraş Dinicu's Hora staccato
- Gustav Holst
  - "If 'twer the Time of Lilies", for two-part choir and piano, H187
  - Jazz-Band Piece
  - Jig, for piano, H179
- John Ireland – A Downland Suite
- Dmitri Kabalevsky – Symphony No. 1
- Ernst Krenek – Kantate von der Vergänglichkeit des Irdischen, for soprano, mixed choir, and piano, Op. 72 (texts by P. Fleming, A. Gryphius, and other 17th-century German writers)
- László Lajtha – Cello Sonata
- Nikolai Myaskovsky – Symphony No. 11
- Harry Partch – "The Lord Is My Shepherd" (Psalm XXIII), for voice and adapted viola
- Paul Pisk
  - Campanella, cantata for voice and orchestra, Op. 28 (text after 11 poems of the Monk [Luitpold])
  - Little Suite, for chamber orchestra, Op. 11a
- Sergei Prokofiev –
  - Piano Concerto No. 5, Op. 55
  - Sonata for Two Violins in C major, Op. 56
- Ottorino Respighi – Huntingtower, for large wind band, P. 173
- Silvestre Revueltas
  - Alcancías, for orchestra
  - Colorines, for orchestra
  - Música de feria (String Quartet No. 4)
  - Three Pieces for violin and piano
- Miklós Rózsa – Bagatelles for Piano, Op. 12
- Arnold Schoenberg
  - Mirror Canon, for string quartet
  - Mirror Canon in four parts, for Carl Moll
  - Moses und Aron, opera in 3 acts (Act 3 not composed)
- William Schuman
  - "God's World", for voice and piano (text by Edna St. Vincent Millay)
  - Potpourri, for orchestra
- Dmitri Shostakovich
  - Hamlet (incidental music for the play by William Shakespeare), Op. 32
  - Lady Macbeth of the Mtsensk District, opera in four acts, Op. 29
  - Six Romances, for tenor and orchestra, Op. 21
  - Twenty-Four Preludes, for piano, Op. 34
  - Vstrechnïy (music for the film directed by F. Ermler and Yutkevich), Op. 33
- Igor Stravinsky
  - Chants du rossignol et Marche chinoise, for violin and piano (arranged from The Nightingale)
  - Danse russe, for violin and piano
  - Duo concertant, for violin and piano
  - Scherzo, for violin and piano [arr. from The Firebird]
  - Suite italienne, for cello and piano (arranged from Pulcinella)
  - Suite italienne, for violin and piano (arranged from Pulcinella)
  - Simvol verï, for SATB choir
- Virgil Thomson
  - String Quartet No. 2
  - Symphony No. 2 (arrangement for piano, four hands)
- Joaquín Turina
  - Homenaje a Tárrega, Op. 69, for guitar
  - Silhouettes, Op. 70, for piano
  - Mujeres españolas, Series 2 Op. 73, for piano
  - Vocalizaciones, Op. 74, for soprano and piano
- Ivan Wyschnegradsky – Prelude and Fugue, for two pianos tuned a quarter tone apart, Op. 21

== Opera ==
- Amy Beach – Cabildo (not performed until 1947)
- Ottorino Respighi – Maria egiziaca
- Pietro Mascagni – Pinotta
- Arnold Schoenberg – Moses und Aron (first staged in 1957)
- Erwin Schulhoff – Flammen
- Kurt Weill – Die Bürgschaft
- Charles Wakefield Cadman – The Willow Tree

== Film ==
- Frank Churchill – Santa's Workshop (film)
- Dmitri Shostakovich – Counterplan (film)
- Max Steiner – Bird of Paradise (1932 film)
- Max Steiner – The Most Dangerous Game (1932 film)
- Max Steiner – Symphony of Six Million

== Musical theater ==
- After Dinner London revue opened at the Gaiety Theatre on October 21
- L'Auberge Du Cheval Blanc Paris production
- Ball im Savoy (music by Paul Abraham, libretto by Alfred Grünwald and Fritz Löhner-Beda). Berlin production
- Ballyhoo (Music: William Waller Lyrics: Robert Nesbitt) London revue opened at the Comedy Theatre on December 22
- Casanova London production
- The Cat and the Fiddle London production opened at the Palace Theatre on March 4 and ran for 329 performances
- The Dubarry
  - London production opened at His Majesty's Theatre on April 14 and ran for 398 performances
  - Broadway production opened at George M. Cohan's Theatre on November 22 and ran for 87 performances
- Face the Music Broadway revue opened at the New Amsterdam Theatre on February 17 and ran for 165 performances
- Gay Divorce Broadway production opened at the Ethel Barrymore Theatre on November 29 and transferred to the Shubert Theatre on January 16, 1933, for a total run of 248 performances
- Men Ken Lebn Nor Men Lost Nisht (I Would If I Could) New York City production at the Parkway Theatre in Brooklyn (includes the song "Bei Mir Bistu Shein")
- Music in the Air Broadway production opened at the Alvin Theatre on November 8 and ran for 342 performances
- Out of the Bottle London production opened at the Hippodrome on June 11 and ran for 109 performances
- Over She Goes London revue opened at the Alhambra Theatre on August 27.
- Show Boat Broadway revival opened at the Casino Theatre on 50th Street on May 19 and ran for 180 performances
- Take a Chance Broadway production opened at the Apollo Theatre on November 26 and ran for 243 performances
- Tell Her the Truth London production opened at the Saville Theatre on June 14 and ran for 234 performances
- Wild Violets opened at the Theatre Royal on October 31 and ran for 291 performances
- Words and Music London revue (Noël Coward) opened at the Adelphi Theatre on September 16.

== Musical films ==
- Carmen, starring Marguerite Namara
- Girl Crazy, starring Dorothy Lee, Robert Quillan, Mitzi Green and Kitty Kelly
- Goodnight, Vienna, starring Jack Buchanan and Anna Neagle
- Gräfin Mariza, starring Dorothea Wieck, Hubert Marischka and Charlotte Ander
- Grün ist die Heide, starring Camilla Spira, Peter Voß and Theodor Loos
- Kiki, starring Anny Ondra and Hermann Thimig and directed by Carl Lamac, with music by Rolf Marbot and lyrics by Bert Reisfeld
- Looking on the Bright Side, starring Gracie Fields
- Love Me Tonight, starring Maurice Chevalier and Jeanette MacDonald
- The Maid of the Mountains, starring Nancy Brown and Harry Welchman
- The Midshipmaid, starring Jessie Matthews
- Monte Carlo Madness, starring Sari Maritza and Hans Albers and featuring the Comedian Harmonists
- One Hour with You, starring Jeanette MacDonald, Maurice Chevalier, Genevieve Tobin and Charles Ruggles
- Pergolesi, starring Elio Steiner, Dria Paola and Tina Lattanzi, directed by Guido Brignone, with music by Giovanni Battista Pergolesi
- The Phantom President, starring George M. Cohan, Claudette Colbert and Jimmy Durante. Directed by Norman Taurog
- Sehnsucht 202, starring Luise Rainer
- Unshudat al-Fu'ad, starring Nadra

== Births ==
- January 19 – Polibio Mayorga, Ecuadorian songwriter, accordionist, and keyboardist
- January 26 – Coxsone Dodd, record producer (d. 2004)
- January 31
  - Rick Hall, record producer (d. 2018)
  - Ottilie Patterson, singer, "the godmother of British blues" (d. 2011)
- February 8 – John Williams, film music composer (Jaws)
- February 11 – Jerome Lowenthal, American pianist
- February 16 – Harry Goz, musical theatre star (d. 2003)
- February 24 – Michel Legrand, composer (d. 2019)
- February 26 – Johnny Cash, country singer (d. 2003)
- March 4 – Miriam Makeba, singer (d. 2008)
- March 15 – Arif Mardin, record producer (d. 2006)
- March 21 – Joseph Silverstein, violinist (d. 2015)
- April 1 – Debbie Reynolds, American actress and singer (d. 2016)
- April 8 – John Kinsella, Irish composer (d. 2021)
- April 9 – Carl Perkins, American rockabilly singer (d. 1998)
- April 10 – Kishori Amonkar, Indian classical singer (d. 2017)
- April 12 – Tiny Tim, American singer and ukulele player (d. 1996)
- April 14 – Loretta Lynn, American country singer (Coal Miner's Daughter) (d. 2022)
- April 26 – Francis Lai, French songwriter and film composer (d. 2018)
- April 27 – Maxine Brown, American country singer (The Browns) (d. 2019)
- April 28 – Marek Kopelent, Czech composer (d. 2023)
- May 19 – Alma Cogan, English singer (d. 1966)
- May 30 – Pauline Oliveros, American electronic music composer (d. 2016)
- June 7 – Tina Brooks, American saxophonist (d. 1974)
- June 19 – Ernest Ranglin, Jamaican guitarist
- June 21 – Lalo Schifrin, Argentine-born American film composer (d. 2025)
- June 27
  - Anna Moffo, American operatic soprano (d. 2006)
  - Hugh Wood, British composer (d. 2021)
- July 1 – Adam Harasiewicz, pianist
- July 11 – Roquel Billy Davis, singer, songwriter and record producer (d. 2004)
- July 12 – Eddy Wally (Eduard Van De Walle), Flemish Schlager music singer (d. 2016)
- July 13 – Per Nørgård, Danish composer (d. 2025)
- July 16 – John Chilton, English jazz trumpeter (d. 2016)
- July 19 – Buster Benton, American singer-songwriter and guitarist (d. 1996)
- August 2 – John Cohen, folk musician and photographer (d. 2019)
- August 23 – Sinn Sisamouth, singer-songwriter, "the King of Khmer music" (d. 1976)
- September 8 – Patsy Cline, country singer (d. 1963)
- September 25 – Glenn Gould, classical pianist (d. 1982)
- September 28 – Víctor Jara, Chilean singer-songwriter (k. 1973)
- October 9 – Alfons Kontarsky, pianist (d. 2010)
- November 1 – Joaquín Achúcarro, pianist
- November 10 – Paul Bley, jazz pianist (d. 2016)
- November 15 – Clyde McPhatter, (The Drifters) (d. 1972)
- November 21 – Pelle Gudmundsen-Holmgreen, Danish composer (d. 2016)
- November 28 – Ethel Ennis, jazz singer (d. 2019)
- November 30 – Bob Moore, bassist (Elvis, Roy Orbison) (d. 2021)
- December 3 – Corry Brokken, Dutch singer, winner of the Eurovision Song Contest 1957 (d. 2016)
- December 5 – Little Richard (Penniman), rock singer, songwriter, pianist and actor (d. 2020)
- December 9 – Donald Byrd, jazz trumpeter (d. 2013)
- December 12 – Charlie Rich, country singer (d. 1995)
- December 15 – Jesse Belvin, singer, pianist and songwriter (d. 1960)
- December 20 – Leslie Adams, American composer and educator
- December 28 – Dorsey Burnette, Rockabilly pioneer (d. 1979)

== Deaths ==
- January 16 – Joseph Kekuku, inventor of the steel guitar (born 1874)
- January 27 – Mortimer Wilson, composer (born 1876)
- February 22 – Johanna Gadski, opera singer (born 1872) (car accident)
- March 1 – Frank Teschemacher, jazz musician (born 1905) (car accident)
- March 3 – Eugen d'Albert, pianist and composer (born 1864)
- March 6 – John Philip Sousa, composer (born 1854)
- March 18 – Chauncey Olcott, songwriter (born 1858)
- March 19 – Richard Specht, musicologist (born 1870)
- April 2 – Hugo Kaun, composer and conductor (born 1863)
- May 5 – Hilda Clark, soprano (born 1872)
- May 6 – Roméo Beaudry, pianist, composer and record producer (born 1882)
- May 9 – Emil Hertzka, music publisher (born 1869)
- May 20 – Bubber Miley, jazz trumpeter (born 1903)
- May 28 – Pascual Contursi, singer and guitarist (born 1888)
- June 7 – Emil Paur, conductor (born 1855)
- June 21 – Giulia Novelli, operatic mezzo-soprano (born 1859)
- July 8 – Samuel Castriota, pianist, guitarist and composer (born 1885)
- July 22
  - Hugh Blair, organist and composer (born 1864)
  - Florenz Ziegfeld, Broadway impresario (born 1867)
- August 16 – Pietro Floridia, composer and conductor (born 1860)
- September 13 – Julius Röntgen, composer (born 1855)
- September 14 – Jean Cras, composer (born 1879)
- September 26 – Pierre De Geyter, composer of The Internationale (born 1848)
- October 19 – Arthur Friedheim, pianist (born 1859)
- October 21 – Al Hopkins, country musician (born 1889)
- October 31 – Hermine Finck, opera singer (born 1872)
- November 8 – Louis R. Dressler, organist and composer (born 1861)
- November 23 – Percy Pitt, organist and conductor (born 1870)
- November 27 – Evelyn Preer, actress and blues singer (born 1896)
- November 28 – Hubert de Blanck, pianist and composer (born 1856)
- December 1 – Amadeo Vives, composer (born 1871)
- December 24 – Eyvind Alnæs, Norwegian pianist, organist and composer (born 1872)
- December 25 – Ernst Rolf, actor and singer (born 1891)
- December 26 – Dina Barberini, operatic soprano (born 1862)
- date unknown – Emanuele Nutile, composer of Neapolitan songs (born 1862)
