= Great American Songbook =

Canon of American jazz standards, popular songs and show tunes

The Great American Songbook is the loosely defined canon of significant 20th-century American jazz standards, popular songs, and show tunes.

== Definition ==
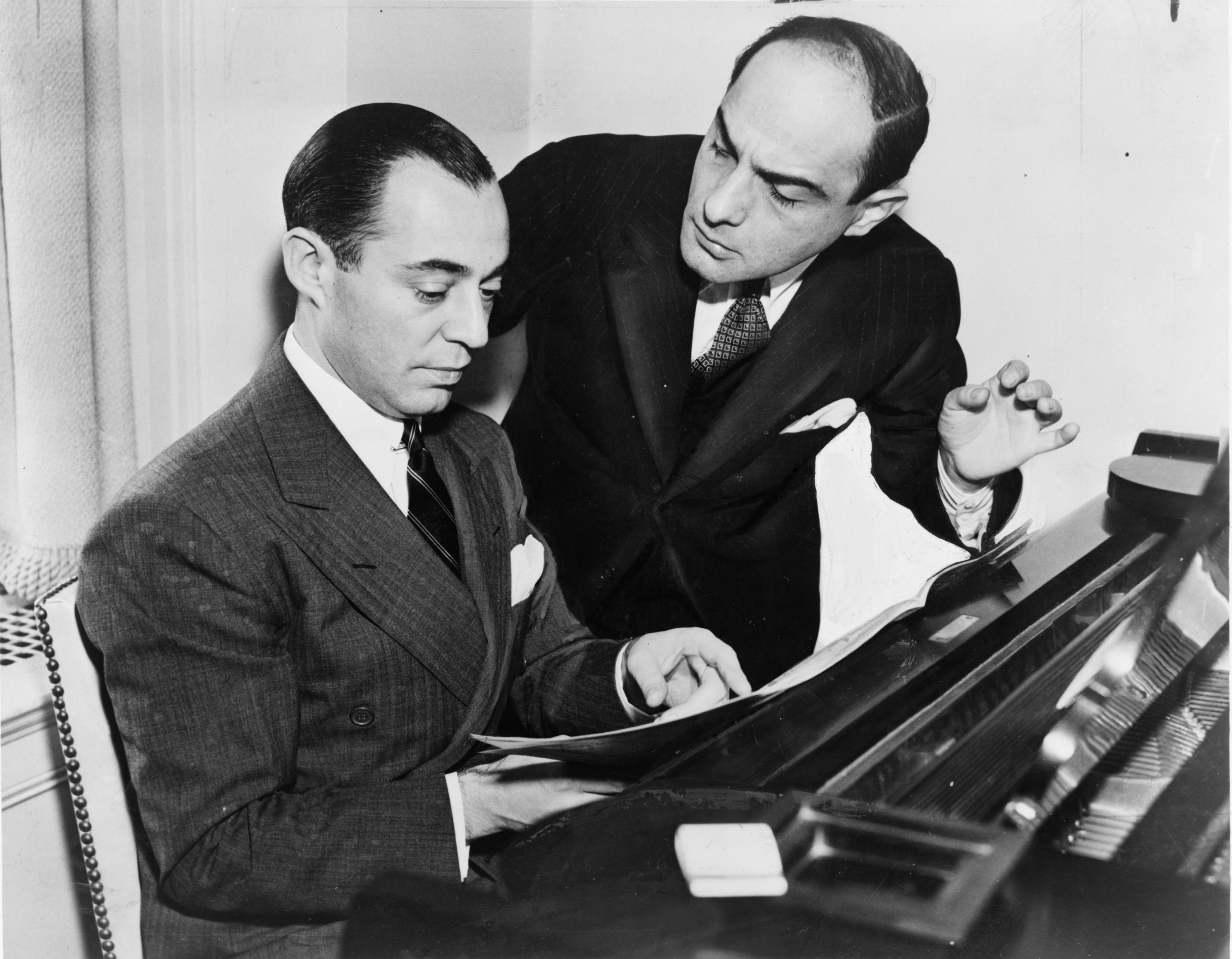
Richard Rodgers and Lorenz Hart

According to the Great American Songbook Foundation:

The "Great American Songbook" is the canon of the most important and influential American popular songs and jazz standards from the early 20th century that have stood the test of time in their life and legacy. Often referred to as "American Standards", the songs published during the Golden Age of this genre include those popular and enduring tunes from the 1920s to the 1950s that were created for Broadway theatre, musical theatre, and Hollywood musical film.

Culture writer Martin Chilton defines the term "Great American Songbook" as follows: "Tunes of Broadway musical theatre, Hollywood movie musicals and Tin Pan Alley (the hub of songwriting that was the music publishers' row on New York's West 28th Street)". Chilton adds that these songs "became the core repertoire of jazz musicians" during the period that "stretched roughly from 1920 to 1960".

Although several collections of music have been published under the "Great American Songbook" title, the term does not refer to any actual book or specific list of songs. The Great American Songbook includes standards by Irving Berlin, George Gershwin, Cole Porter, Jerome Kern, Harold Arlen, Johnny Mercer, Hoagy Carmichael, Richard Rodgers, Lorenz Hart, and Oscar Hammerstein II, among others.

In Alec Wilder's 1972 study, American Popular Song: The Great Innovators, 1900–1950, the songwriter and critic lists and ranks the artists he believes belong to the Great American Songbook canon. A composer, Wilder emphasized analysis of composers and their creative efforts in this work.

Radio personality Jonathan Schwartz and singer Tony Bennett, both Songbook devotees, have both described this genre as "America's classical music".

== List of songs ==
Alphabetical list of songs with names of composers and lyricists
Year	Song title	Composer(s)	Lyricist(s)	Notes
1933	"42nd Street"	Harry Warren	Al Dubin	
1935	"About a Quarter to Nine"	Harry Warren	Al Dubin	
1944	"Ac-Cent-Tchu-Ate the Positive"	Harold Arlen	Johnny Mercer	
1957	"An Affair to Remember (Our Love Affair)"	Harry Warren	Leo McCarey and Harold Adamson	
1929	"Ain't Misbehavin'"	Fats Waller	Andy Razaf	
1927	"Ain't She Sweet"	Milton Ager	Jack Yellen	
1960	"Ain't That a Kick in the Head"	Jimmy Van Heusen	Sammy Cahn	
1921	"Ain't We Got Fun"	Richard A. Whiting	Raymond B. Egan and Gus Kahn	
1924	"Alabamy Bound"	Ray Henderson	Buddy DeSylva and Bud Green	
1911	"Alexander's Ragtime Band"	Irving Berlin	Irving Berlin	
1921	"All by Myself"	Irving Berlin	Irving Berlin	
1934	"All I Do Is Dream of You"	Nacio Herb Brown	Arthur Freed	
1931	"All of Me"	Gerald Marks	Seymour Simons	
1954	"All of You"	Cole Porter	Cole Porter	
1939	"All or Nothing at All"	Arthur Altman	Jack Lawrence	
1939	"All the Things You Are"	Jerome Kern	Oscar Hammerstein II	
1957	"All the Way"	Jimmy Van Heusen	Sammy Cahn	
1934	"All Through the Night"	Cole Porter	Cole Porter	
1947	"Almost Like Being in Love"	Frederick Loewe	Alan Jay Lerner	
1932	"Alone Together"	Arthur Schwartz	Howard Dietz	
1925	"Always"	Irving Berlin	Irving Berlin	
1934	"Anything Goes"	Cole Porter	Cole Porter	
1946	"Anything You Can Do (I Can Do Better)"	Irving Berlin	Irving Berlin	
1932	"April In Paris"	Vernon Duke	Yip Harburg	
1957	"April Love"	Sammy Fain	Paul Francis Webster	
1956	"Around the World"	Victor Young	Harold Adamson	
1931	"As Time Goes By"	Herman Hupfeld	Herman Hupfeld	
1941	"At Last"	Harry Warren	Mack Gordon	
1946	"Autumn Leaves"	Joseph Kosma	Johnny Mercer	
1934	"Autumn In New York"	Vernon Duke	Vernon Duke	
1949	"Baby, It's Cold Outside"	Frank Loesser	Frank Loesser	
1949	"Bali Ha'i"	Richard Rodgers	Oscar Hammerstein II	
1929	"Basin Street Blues"	Spencer Williams	Glenn Miller	
1942	"Be Careful! It's My Heart"	Irving Berlin	Irving Berlin	
1935	"Begin the Beguine"	Cole Porter	Cole Porter	
1959	"The Best Is Yet to Come"	Cy Coleman	Carolyn Leigh	
1927	"The Best Things in Life Are Free"	Ray Henderson	Buddy DeSylva and Lew Brown	
1940	"Bewitched, Bothered, and Bewildered"	Richard Rodgers	Lorenz Hart	
1930	"Beyond the Blue Horizon"	Richard A. Whiting	Leo Robin	
1930	"Bidin' My Time"	George Gershwin	Ira Gershwin	
1924	"Big Bad Bill (Is Sweet William Now)"	Milton Ager	Jack Yellen	
1962	"Big Spender"	Cy Coleman	Dorothy Fields	
1926	"The Birth of the Blues"	Ray Henderson	Buddy DeSylva and Lew Brown	
1948	"Black Coffee"	Sonny Burke	Paul Francis Webster	
1934	"Blame It on My Youth"	Oscar Levant	Edward Heyman	
1953	"Blue Gardenia"	Lester Lee	Bob Russell	
1934	"Blue Moon"	Richard Rodgers	Lorenz Hart	
1926	"Blue Room"	Richard Rodgers	Lorenz Hart	
1926	"Blue Skies"	Irving Berlin	Irving Berlin	
1941	"Blues in the Night"	Harold Arlen	Johnny Mercer	
1930	"Body and Soul"	Johnny Green	Edward Heyman	
1941	"Boogie Woogie Bugle Boy"	Don Raye	Hughie Prince	
1933	"Boulevard of Broken Dreams"	Harry Warren	Al Dubin	
1944	"The Boy Next Door"	Hugh Martin	Ralph Blane	
1926	"Breezin' Along with the Breeze"	Haven Gillespie	Haven Gillespie, Seymour Simons, and Richard Whiting	
1932	"Brother, Can You Spare a Dime?"	Jay Gorney	Yip Harburg	
1947	"But Beautiful"	Jimmy Van Heusen	Johnny Burke	
1930	"But Not for Me"	George Gershwin	Ira Gershwin	
1928	"Button Up Your Overcoat"	Ray Henderson	Buddy DeSylva and Lew Brown	
1948	"Buttons and Bows"	Jay Livingston	Ray Evans	
1967	"By the Time I Get to Phoenix"	Jimmy Webb	Jimmy Webb	
1926	"Bye Bye Blackbird"	Ray Henderson	Mort Dixon	
1962	"Call Me Irresponsible"	Jimmy Van Heusen	Sammy Cahn	
1962	"Can't Get Used to Losing You"	Doc Pomus	Mort Shuman	
1929	"Can't We Be Friends?"	Kay Swift	Paul James	
1933	"(The) Carioca"	Vincent Youmans	Edward Eliscu and Gus Kahn	
1922	"Carolina in the Morning"	Walter Donaldson	Gus Kahn	
1938	"Change Partners"	Irving Berlin	Irving Berlin	
1941	"Chattanooga Choo Choo"	Harry Warren	Mack Gordon	
1935	"Cheek to Cheek"	Irving Berlin	Irving Berlin	
1945	"The Christmas Song"	Mel Tormé	Robert Wells	
1959	"Climb Every Mountain"	Richard Rodgers	Oscar Hammerstein II	
1951	"Cold, Cold Heart"	Hiram Williams	Hiram Williams	
1958	"Come Fly with Me"	Jimmy Van Heusen	Sammy Cahn	
1946	"Come Rain or Come Shine"	Harold Arlen	Johnny Mercer	
1954	"Count Your Blessings (Instead of Sheep)"	Irving Berlin	Irving Berlin	
1928	"Crazy Rhythm"	Irving Caesar	Joseph Meyer and Roger Wolfe Kahn	
1931	"Dancing in the Dark"	Arthur Schwartz	Howard Dietz	
1930	"Dancing on the Ceiling"	Richard Rodgers	Lorenz Hart	
1939	"Darn That Dream"	Jimmy Van Heusen	Eddie DeLange	
1945	"Day by Day"	Axel Stordahl	Paul Weston	
1939	"Day In, Day Out"	Rube Bloom	Johnny Mercer	
1963	"Days of Wine and Roses"	Henry Mancini	Johnny Mercer	
1942	"Dearly Beloved"	Jerome Kern	Johnny Mercer	
1933	"Deep Purple"	Peter DeRose	Mitchell Parish	
1949	"Diamonds Are a Girl's Best Friend"	Jule Styne	Leo Robin	
1959	"Do-Re-Mi"	Richard Rodgers	Oscar Hammerstein II	
1932	"Don't Blame Me"	Jimmy McHugh	Dorothy Fields	
1934	"Don't Fence Me in"	Cole Porter	Robert Fletcher and Cole Porter	
1940	"Don't Get Around Much Anymore"	Duke Ellington	Bob Russell	
1962	"Don't Make Me Over"	Burt Bacharach	Hal David	
1964	"Don't Rain on My Parade"	Jule Styne	Bob Merrill	
1942	"Don't Sit Under the Apple Tree"	Sam H. Stept	Lew Brown and Charles Tobias	
1944	"Dream"	Johnny Mercer	Johnny Mercer	
1931	"Dream a Little Dream of Me"	Fabian Andre and Wilbur Schwandt	Gus Kahn	
1933	"Easter Parade"	Irving Berlin	Irving Berlin	
1937	"Easy Living"	Ralph Rainger	Leo Robin	
1959	"Edelweiss"	Richard Rodgers	Oscar Hammerstein II	
1928	"Embraceable You"	George Gershwin	Ira Gershwin	
1959	"Everything's Coming Up Roses"	Jule Styne	Stephen Sondheim	
1944	"Ev'ry Time We Say Goodbye"	Cole Porter	Cole Porter	
1930	"Exactly Like You"	Jimmy McHugh	Dorothy Fields	
1938	"Falling in Love With Love"	Richard Rodgers	Lorenz Hart	
1924	"Fascinating Rhythm"	George Gershwin	Ira Gershwin	
1939	"Fine and Mellow"	Billie Holiday	Billie Holiday	
1936	"A Fine Romance"	Jerome Kern	Dorothy Fields	
1954	"Fly Me to the Moon"	Bart Howard	Bart Howard	
1937	"A Foggy Day"	George Gershwin	Ira Gershwin	
1937	"The Folks Who Live On the Hill"	Jerome Kern	Oscar Hammerstein II	
1940	"Fools Rush In"	Rube Bloom	Johnny Mercer	
1931	"For All We Know"	J. Fred Coots	Sam M. Lewis	
1945	"(I Love You) For Sentimental Reasons"	William "Pat" Best	Ivory "Deek" Watson	
1950	"From This Moment On"	Cole Porter	Cole Porter	
1930	"Georgia on My Mind"	Hoagy Carmichael	Stuart Gorrell	
1930	"Get Happy"	Harold Arlen	Ted Koehler	
1951	"Getting to Know You"	Richard Rodgers	Oscar Hammerstein	
1929	"Glad Rag Doll"	Milton Ager	Jack Yellen	
1936	"Glad to Be Unhappy"	Richard Rodgers	Lorenz Hart	
1936	"The Glory of Love"	Billy Hill	Billy Hill	
1938	"God Bless America"	Irving Berlin	Irving Berlin	
1933	"The Gold Diggers' Song (We're in the Money)"	Harry Warren	Al Dubin	
1937	"Gone with the Wind"	Allie Wrubel	Herb Magidson	
1939	"Good Morning"	Nacio Herb Brown	Arthur Freed	
1931	"Guilty"	Richard A. Whiting	Gus Kahn	
1937	"The Gypsy in My Soul"	Clay Boland	Moe Jaffe	
1951	"Half as Much"	Curley Williams	Curley Williams	
1943	"Happiness Is a Thing Called Joe"	Harold Arlen	Yip Harburg	
1930	"Happy Days Are Here Again"	Milton Ager	Jack Yellen	
1949	"Happy Talk"	Richard Rodgers	Oscar Hammerstein II	
1924	"Hard Hearted Hannah (The Vamp of Savannah)"	Milton Ager	Jack Yellen, Bob Bigelow, and Charles Bates	
1937	"Have You Met Miss Jones?"	Richard Rodgers	Lorenz Hart	
1944	"Have Yourself a Merry Little Christmas"	Hugh Martin	Ralph Blane	
1938	"Heart and Soul"	Hoagy Carmichael	Frank Loesser	
1933	"Heat Wave"	Irving Berlin	Irving Berlin	
1937	"Heigh-Ho"	Frank Churchill	Larry Morey	
1964	"Hello, Dolly!"	Jerry Herman	Jerry Herman	
1951	"Hello, Young Lovers"	Richard Rodgers	Oscar Hammerstein II	
1953	"Here's That Rainy Day"	Jimmy Van Heusen	Johnny Burke	
1960	"Hey, Look Me Over"	Cy Coleman	Carolyn Leigh	
1929	"Honey"	Haven Gillespie	Haven Gillespie, Seymour Simons, and Richard Whiting	
1929	"Honeysuckle Rose"	Fats Waller	Andy Razaf	
1937	"Hooray for Hollywood"	Richard A. Whiting	Johnny Mercer	
1941	"How About You?"	Burton Lane	Ralph Freed	
1946	"How Are Things in Glocca Morra?"	Burton Lane	Yip Harburg	
1932	"How Deep is the Ocean?"	Irving Berlin	Irving Berlin	
1940	"How High the Moon"	Morgan Lewis	Nancy Hamilton	
1927	"How Long Has This Been Going On?"	George Gershwin	Ira Gershwin	
1936	"I Can't Escape from You"	Richard A. Whiting	Leo Robin	
1936	"I Can't Get Started"	Vernon Duke	Ira Gershwin	
1928	"I Can't Give You Anything But Love"	Jimmy McHugh	Dorothy Fields	
1939	"I Concentrate on You"	Cole Porter	Cole Porter	
1956	"I Could Have Danced All Night"	Frederick Loewe	Alan Jay Lerner	
1940	"I Could Write a Book"	Richard Rodgers	Lorenz Hart	
1933	"I Cover the Waterfront"	Johnny Green	Edward Heyman	
1939	"I Didn't Know What Time It Was"	Richard Rodgers	Lorenz Hart	
1931	"I Don't Know Why (I Just Do)"	Fred E. Ahlert	Roy Turk	
1932	"I Don't Stand a Ghost of a Chance with You"	Victor Young	Ned Washington and Bing Crosby	
1958	"I Enjoy Being a Girl"	Richard Rodgers	Oscar Hammerstein II	
1944	"I Fall in Love Too Easily"	Jule Styne	Sammy Cahn	
1931	"I Found a Million Dollar Baby"	Harry Warren	Mort Dixon and Billy Rose	
1934	"I Get a Kick Out of You"	Cole Porter	Cole Porter	
1934	"I Got Plenty o' Nuttin'"	George Gershwin	Ira Gershwin	
1930	"I Got Rhythm"	George Gershwin	Ira Gershwin	
1932	"I Gotta Right to Sing the Blues"	Harold Arlen	Ted Koehler	
1944	"I Guess I'll Hang My Tears Out to Dry"	Jule Styne	Sammy Cahn	
1929	"I Guess I'll Have to Change My Plan"	Arthur Schwartz	Howard Dietz	
1942	"I Had the Craziest Dream"	Harry Warren	Mack Gordon	
1951	"I Have Dreamed"	Richard Rodgers	Oscar Hammerstein II	
1941	"I Know Why (And So Do You)"	Harry Warren	Mack Gordon	
1962	"I Left My Heart in San Francisco"	George Cory	Douglass Cross	
1933	"I Like the Likes of You"	Vernon Duke	Yip Harburg	
1934	"I Only Have Eyes for You"	Harry Warren	Al Dubin	
1941	"I Remember You"	Victor Schertzinger	Johnny Mercer	
1966	"I Say a Little Prayer"	Burt Bacharach	Hal David	
1937	"I See Your Face Before Me"	Arthur Schwartz	Howard Dietz	
1951	"I Talk to the Trees"	Frederick Loewe	Alan Jay Lerner	
1939	"I Thought About You"	Jimmy Van Heusen	Johnny Mercer	
1959	"I Wanna Be Around"	Johnny Mercer	Johnny Mercer and Sadie Vimmerstadt	
1928	"I Wanna Be Loved by You"	Herbert Stothart	Bert Kalmar	
1925	"I Want to Be Happy"	Vincent Youmans	Irving Caesar	
1960	"If Ever I Would Leave You"	Frederick Loewe	Alan Jay Lerner	
1945	"If I Loved You"	Richard Rodgers	Oscar Hammerstein II	
1939	"If I Only Had a Brain"	Harold Arlen	Yip Harburg	
1950	"If I Were a Bell"	Frank Loesser	Frank Loesser	
1966	"If My Friends Could See Me Now"	Cy Coleman	Dorothy Fields	
1943	"I'll Be Home for Christmas"	Walter Kent	Kim Gannon	
1938	"I'll Be Seeing You"	Sammy Fain	Irving Kahal	
1924	"I'll See You in My Dreams"	Isham Jones	Gus Kahn	
1934	"I'll String Along with You"	Harry Warren	Al Dubin	
1944	"I'm Beginning to See the Light"	Duke Ellington	Don George	
1935	"I'm in the Mood for Love"	Jimmy McHugh	Dorothy Fields	
1945	"I'm Just a Lucky So-and-So"	Duke Ellington	Mack David	
1921	"I'm Just Wild About Harry"	Eubie Blake	Noble Sissle	
1925	"I'm Sitting on Top of the World"	Ray Henderson	Sam M. Lewis and Joe Young	
1940	"Imagination"	Jimmy Van Heusen	Johnny Burke	
1926	"In a Little Spanish Town"	Mabel Wayne	Sam M. Lewis and Joe Young	
1935	"In a Sentimental Mood"	Duke Ellington	Manny Kurtz	
1951	"In the Cool, Cool, Cool of the Evening"	Hoagy Carmichael	Johnny Mercer	
1937	"In the Still of the Night"	Cole Porter	Cole Porter	
1955	"Innamorata"	Harry Warren	Jack Brooks	
1932	"Isn't It Romantic?"	Richard Rodgers	Lorenz Hart	
1935	"It Ain't Necessarily So"	George Gershwin	Ira Gershwin	
1926	"It All Depends on You"	Ray Henderson	Buddy DeSylva and Lew Brown	
1944	"It Could Happen to You"	Jimmy Van Heusen	Johnny Burke	
1931	"It Don't Mean a Thing (If It Ain't Got That Swing)"	Duke Ellington	Irving Mills	
1924	"It Had to Be You"	Isham Jones	Gus Kahn	
1941	"It Happened in Sun Valley"	Harry Warren	Mack Gordon	
1945	"It Might as Well Be Spring"	Richard Rodgers	Oscar Hammerstein II	
1940	"It Never Entered My Mind"	Richard Rodgers	Lorenz Hart	
1948	"It's a Most Unusual Day"	Jimmy McHugh	Harold Adamson	
1953	"It's All Right with Me"	Cole Porter	Harold Adamson	
1936	"It's De-Lovely"	Cole Porter	Cole Porter	
1935	"It's Easy To Remember"	Richard Rodgers	Lorenz Hart	
1933	"It's Only a Paper Moon"	Harold Arlen	E.Y. Harburg and Billy Rose	
1930	"I've Got a Crush on You"	George Gershwin	Ira Gershwin	
1937	"I've Got My Love to Keep Me Warm"	Irving Berlin	Irving Berlin	
1932	"I've Got the World on a String"	Harold Arlen	Ted Koehler	
1936	"I've Got You Under My Skin"	Cole Porter	Cole Porter	
1962	"I've Got Your Number"	Cy Coleman	Carolyn Leigh	
1956	"I've Grown Accustomed to Her Face"	Frederick Loewe	Alan Jay Lerner	
1920	"The Japanese Sandman"	Richard A. Whiting	Raymond B. Egan	
1938	"Jeepers Creepers"	Harry Warren	Johnny Mercer	
1938	"Jumpin' at the Woodside"	Count Basie	Eddie Durham	
1956	"Just in Time"	Jule Styne	Betty Comden and Adolph Green	
1935	"Just One of Those Things"	Cole Porter	Cole Porter	
1933	"Keep Young and Beautiful"	Harry Warren	Al Dubin	
1942	"(I've Got a Gal in) Kalamazoo"	Harry Warren	Mack Gordon	
1935	"A Kiss to Build a Dream On"	Harry Ruby	Bert Kalmar and Oscar Hammerstein II	
1937	"The Lady is a Tramp"	Richard Rodgers	Lorenz Hart	
1940	"The Last Time I Saw Paris"	Jerome Kern	Oscar Hammerstein II	
1945	"Laura"	David Raksin	Johnny Mercer	
1930	"Lazy River"	Sidney Arodin	Hoagy Carmichael	
1945	"Let It Snow! Let It Snow! Let It Snow!"	Jule Styne	Sammy Cahn	
1937	"Let's Call the Whole Thing Off"	George Gershwin	Ira Gershwin	
1928	"Let's Do It, Let's Fall in Love"	Cole Porter	Cole Porter	
1936	"Let's Face the Music and Dance"	Irving Berlin	Irving Berlin	
1933	"Let's Fall in Love"	Harold Arlen	Ted Koehler	
1932	"Let's Put Out the Lights (and Go to Sleep)"	Herman Hupfeld	Herman Hupfeld	
1944	"Like Someone in Love"	Jimmy Van Heusen	Johnny Burke	
1935	"Little Girl Blue"	Richard Rodgers	Lorenz Hart	
1930	"Little White Lies"	Walter Donaldson	Walter Donaldson	
1944	"Long Ago (and Far Away)"	Jerome Kern	Ira Gershwin	
1919	"Look for the Silver Lining"	Jerome Kern	B.G. DeSylva	
1923	"Louisville Lou (That Vampin' Lady)"	Milton Ager	Jack Yellen	
1930	"Love for Sale"	Cole Porter	Cole Porter	
1955	"Love is a Many-Splendored Thing"	Sammy Fain	Paul Francis Webster	
1938	"Love Is Here to Stay"	George Gershwin	Ira Gershwin	
1931	"Love Is Sweeping the Country"	George Gershwin	Ira Gershwin	
1932	"Love Is the Sweetest Thing"	Ray Noble	Ray Noble	
1945	"Love Letters"	Victor Young	Edward Heyman	
1931	"Love Letters in the Sand"	J. Fred Coots	Nick Kenny and Charles Kenny	
1928	"Love Me or Leave Me"	Walter Donaldson	Gus Kahn	
1937	"Love Walked In"	George Gershwin	Ira Gershwin	
1932	"Lover"	Richard Rodgers	Lorenz Hart	
1941	"Lover Man"	Jimmy Davis	Ram Ramirez	
1928	"Lover, Come Back to Me"	Sigmund Romberg	Oscar Hammerstein II	
1950	"Luck Be a Lady"	Frank Loesser	Frank Loesser	
1952	"Lullaby of Birdland"	George Shearing	George David Weiss	
1935	"Lullaby of Broadway"	Harry Warren	Al Dubin	
1935	"Lulu's Back In Town"	Harry Warren	Al Dubin	
1939	"Lydia the Tattooed Lady"	Harold Arlen	Yip Harburg	
1932	"Mad About the Boy"	Noël Coward	Noël Coward	
1928	"Makin' Whoopee"	Walter Donaldson	Gus Kahn	
1953	"The Man that Got Away"	Harold Arlen	Ira Gershwin	
1925	"Manhattan"	Richard Rodgers	Lorenz Hart	
1924	"The Man I Love"	George Gershwin	Ira Gershwin	
1927	"Me and My Shadow"	Al Jolson	Billy Rose	
1955	"Memories Are Made of This"	Terry Gilkyson and Richard Dehr	Frank Miller	
1930	"Memories of You"	Eubie Blake	Andy Razaf	
1954	"Midnight Sun"	Lionel Hampton	Johnny Mercer	
1932	"Mimi"	Richard Rodgers	Lorenz Hart	
1931	"Minnie the Moocher"	Cab Calloway	Irving Mills and Clarence Gaskill	
1935	"Miss Brown to You"	Richard A. Whiting	Leo Robin	
1934	"Miss Otis Regrets"	Cole Porter	Cole Porter	
1954	"Misty"	Erroll Garner	Johnny Burke	
1950	"Mona Lisa"	Jay Livingston	Ray Evans	
1930	"Mood Indigo"	Duke Ellington	Irving Mills	
1961	"Moon River"	Henry Mancini	Johnny Mercer	
1934	"Moonglow"	Will Hudson and Irving Mills	Eddie DeLange	
1942	"Moonlight Becomes You"	Jimmy Van Heusen	Johnny Burke	
1944	"Moonlight in Vermont"	John Blackburn	Karl Suessdorf	
1939	"Moonlight Serenade"	Glenn Miller	Mitchell Parish	
1929	"More Than You Know"	Vincent Youmans	Billy Rose and Edward Eliscu	
1945	"The More I See You"	Harry Warren	Mack Gordon	
1935	"The Most Beautiful Girl in the World"	Richard Rodgers	Lorenz Hart	
1925	"Mountain Greenery"	Richard Rodgers	Lorenz Hart	
1959	“Mr. Goldstone, I Love You”	Jule Styne	Stephen Sondheim	
1930	"My Baby Just Cares for Me"	Walter Donaldson	Gus Kahn	
1927	"My Blue Heaven"	Walter Donaldson	George A. Whiting	
1949	"My Dream Is Yours"	Harry Warren	Ralph Blane	
1959	"My Favorite Things"	Richard Rodgers	Oscar Hammerstein II	
1949	"My Foolish Heart"	Victor Young	Ned Washington	
1937	"My Funny Valentine"	Richard Rodgers	Lorenz Hart	
1938	"My Heart Belongs to Daddy"	Cole Porter	Cole Porter	
1927	"My Heart Stood Still"	Richard Rodgers	Lorenz Hart	
1918	"My Mammy"	Walter Donaldson	Joe Young and Sam M. Lewis	
1953	"My One and Only Love"	Guy Wood	Robert Mellin	
1935	"My Romance"	Richard Rodgers	Lorenz Hart	
1925	"My Yiddishe Momme"	Lew Pollack	Jack Yellen	
1928	"Nagasaki"	Harry Warren	Mort Dixon	
1938	"The Nearness of You"	Hoagy Carmichael	Ned Washington	
1967	"Never My Love"	Don Addrisi	Dick Addrisi	
1931	"Nevertheless"	Harry Ruby	Bert Kalmar	
1944	"New York, New York"	Leonard Bernstein	Betty Comden and Adolph Green	
1937	"Nice Work if You Can Get it"	George Gershwin	Ira Gershwin	
1932	"Night and Day"	Cole Porter	Cole Porter	
1931	"Of Thee I Sing"	George Gershwin	Ira Gershwin	
1918	"Oh! How I Hate to Get Up in the Morning"	Irving Berlin	Irving Berlin	
1943	"Oh What a Beautiful Mornin'"	Richard Rodgers	Oscar Hammerstein II	
1911	"Oh, You Beautiful Doll"	Seymour Brown	Nat D. Ayer	
1927	"Ol' Man River"	Jerome Kern	Oscar Hammerstein II	
1946	"The Old Lamp-Lighter"	Nat Simon	Charles Tobias	
1946	"Ole Buttermilk Sky"	Hoagy Carmichael	Jack Brooks	
1965	"On a Clear Day (You Can See Forever)"	Burton Lane	Alan Jay Lerner	
1947	"On Green Dolphin Street"	Bronisław Kaper	Ned Washington	
1945	"On the Atchison, Topeka and the Santa Fe"	Harry Warren	Johnny Mercer	
1934	"On the Good Ship Lollipop"	Richard A. Whiting	Sidney Clare	
1956	"On the Street Where You Live"	Frederick Loewe	Alan Jay Lerner	
1930	"On the Sunny Side of the Street"	Jimmy McHugh	Dorothy Fields	
1943	"One for My Baby"	Harold Arlen	Johnny Mercer	
1962	"Our Day Will Come"	Mort Garson	Bob Hilliard	
1944	"Out of This World"	Harold Arlen	Johnny Mercer	
1939	"Over the Rainbow"	Harold Arlen	E.Y. Harburg	
1929	"Pagan Love Song"	Nacio Herb Brown	Arthur Freed	
1931	"Paradise"	Nacio Herb Brown	Arthur Freed	
1956	"The Party's Over"	Jule Styne	Betty Comden and Adolph Green	
1936	"Pennies From Heaven"	Arthur Johnston	Johnny Burke	
1964	"People"	Jule Styne	Bob Merrill	
1943	"People Will Say We're in Love"	Richard Rodgers	Oscar Hammerstein II	
1936	"Pick Yourself Up"	Jerome Kern	Dorothy Fields	
1940	"Polka Dots and Moonbeams"	Jimmy Van Heusen	Johnny Burke	
1942	"Praise the Lord and Pass the Ammunition"	Frank Loesser	Frank Loesser	
1919	"A Pretty Girl is Like a Melody"	Irving Berlin	Irving Berlin	
1930	"Puttin' on the Ritz"	Irving Berlin	Irving Berlin	
1953	"Rags to Riches"	Richard Adler	Jerry Ross	
1962	"Ramblin' Rose"	Joe Sherman	Noel Sherman	
1929	"Rockin' Chair"	Hoagy Carmichael	Hoagy Carmichael	
1959	“Rose's Turn”	Jule Styne	Stephen Sondheim	
1944	"'Round Midnight"	Thelonious Monk	Bernie Hanighen	
1944	"Rum and Coca-Cola"	Lionel Belasco	Morey Amsterdam	
1927	"'S Wonderful"	George Gershwin	Ira Gershwin	
1934	"Santa Claus is Coming to Town"	J. Fred Coots	Haven Gillespie	
1953	"Satin Doll"	Duke Ellington	Johnny Mercer	
1944	"Saturday Night (Is the Loneliest Night of the Week)"	Jule Styne	Sammy Cahn	
1932	"Say It Isn't So"	Irving Berlin	Irving Berlin	
1922	"Second Hand Rose"	Grant Clarke.	James F. Hanley	
1973	“Send In the Clowns”	Stephen Sondheim	Stephen Sondheim	
1944	"Sentimental Journey"	Les Brown and Ben Homer	Bud Green	
1935	"September in the Rain"	Harry Warren	Al Dubin	
1938	"September Song"	Kurt Weill	Maxwell Anderson	
1942	"Serenade in Blue"	Harry Warren	Mack Gordon	
1965	"The Shadow of Your Smile"	Johnny Mandel	Paul Francis Webster	
1951	"Shall We Dance?"	Richard Rodgers	Oscar Hammerstein II	
1935	"She's a Latin from Manhattan"	Harry Warren	Al Dubin	
1929	"She's (He's) Funny That Way"	Neil Moret	Richard A. Whiting	
1929	"A Ship Without a Sail"	Richard Rodgers	Lorenz Hart	
1929	"Singin' in the Rain"	Nacio Herb Brown	Arthur Freed	
1941	"Skylark"	Hoagy Carmichael	Johnny Mercer	
1937	"Slap That Bass"	George Gershwin	Ira Gershwin	
1948	"On a Slow Boat to China"	Frank Loesser	Frank Loesser	
1933	"Smoke Gets in Your Eyes"	Jerome Kern	Otto Harbach	
1948	"So in Love"	Cole Porter	Cole Porter	
1949	"Some Enchanted Evening"	Richard Rodgers	Oscar Hammerstein II	
1924	"Somebody Loves Me"	George Gershwin	Ballard MacDonald and Buddy DeSylva	
1937	"Someday My Prince Will Come"	Frank Churchill	Larry Morey	
1926	"Someone to Watch Over Me"	George Gershwin	Ira Gershwin	
1966	"Somethin' Stupid"	C. Carson Parks	C. Carson Parks	
1951	"Something Wonderful"	Richard Rodgers	Oscar Hammerstein II	
1954	"Something's Gotta Give"	Johnny Mercer	Johnny Mercer	
1927	"Sometimes I'm Happy"	Vincent Youmans	Irving Caesar	
1957	"Somewhere"	Leonard Bernstein	Stephen Sondheim	
1932	"The Song Is You"	Jerome Kern	Oscar Hammerstein II	
1928	"Sonny Boy"	Ray Henderson	Buddy DeSylva and Lew Brown	
1932	"Sophisticated Lady"	Duke Ellington	Irving Mills	
1959	"The Sound of Music"	Richard Rodgers	Oscar Hammerstein II	
1939	"South American Way"	Jimmy McHugh	Al Dubin	
1930	"Spring Is Here"	Richard Rodgers	Lorenz Hart	
1925	"Squeeze Me"	Fats Waller	Andy Razaf	
1922	"Stairway to Paradise"	George Gershwin	Ira Gershwin and Buddy DeSylva	
1939	"Stairway to the Stars"	Matty Malneck and Frank Signorelli	Mitchell Parish	
1956	"Standing on the Corner"	Frank Loesser	Frank Loesser	
1927	"Stardust"	Hoagy Carmichael	Mitchell Parish	
1934	"Stars Fell on Alabama"	Frank Perkins	Mitchell Parish	
1944	"Stella by Starlight"	Victor Young	Ned Washington	
1948	"Steppin' Out with My Baby"	Irving Berlin	Irving Berlin	
1933	"Stormy Weather"	Harold Arlen	Ted Koehler	
1944	"Straighten Up and Fly Right"	Nat King Cole and Irving Mills	Johnny Mercer	
1927	"Strike Up the Band"	George Gershwin	Ira Gershwin and Millie Raush	
1941	"A String of Pearls"	Jerry Gray	Eddie DeLange	
1934	"Summertime"	George Gershwin	DuBose Heyward and Ira Gershwin	
1943	"The Surrey with the Fringe on Top"	Richard Rodgers	Oscar Hammerstein II	
1925	"Sweet Georgia Brown"	Ben Bernie and Maceo Pinkard	Kenneth Casey	
1937	"Sweet Leilani"	Harry Owens	Harry Owens	
1928	"Sweet Lorraine"	Cliff Burwell	Mitchell Parish	
1944	"Swinging on a Star"	Jimmy Van Heusen	Johnny Burke	
1939	"Take the 'A' Train"	Billy Strayhorn	Joya Sherrill	
1940	"Taking a Chance on Love"	Vernon Duke	John La Touche and Ted Fetter	
1941	"Tangerine"	Victor Schertzinger	Johnny Mercer	
1924	"Tea for Two"	Vincent Youmans	Irving Caesar	
1933	"Temptation"	Nacio Herb Brown	Arthur Freed	
1962	"Tender is the Night"	Sammy Fain	Paul Francis Webster	
1955	"(Love Is) The Tender Trap"	Jimmy Van Heusen	Sammy Cahn	
1957	"Thank Heaven for Little Girls"	Frederick Loewe	Alan Jay Lerner	
1938	"Thanks for the Memory"	Ralph Rainger	Leo Robin	
1925	"That Certain Feeling"	George Gershwin	Ira Gershwin	
1942	"That Old Black Magic"	Harold Arlen	Johnny Mercer	
1937	"That Old Feeling"	Sammy Fain	Lew Brown	
1952	"That's All"	Bob Haymes	Alan Brandt	
1953	"That's Amore"	Harry Warren	Jack Brooks	
1952	"That's Entertainment!"	Arthur Schwartz	Howard Dietz	
1942	"There Will Never Be Another You"	Harry Warren	Mack Gordon	
1936	"There's a Small Hotel"	Richard Rodgers	Lorenz Hart	
1946	"There's No Business Like Show Business"	Irving Berlin	Irving Berlin	
1936	"These Foolish Things (Remind Me of You)"	Jack Strachey	Eric Maschwitz	
1951	"They Call the Wind Maria"	Frederick Loewe	Alan Jay Lerner	
1937	"They Can't Take That Away from Me"	George Gershwin	Ira Gershwin	
1946	"The Things We Did Last Summer"	Jule Styne	Sammy Cahn	
1927	"Thinking of You"	Harry Ruby	Bert Kalmar	
1938	"This Can't Be Love"	Richard Rodgers	Lorenz Hart	
1968	"This Guy's in Love with You"	Burt Bacharach	Hal David	
1946	"This Heart of Mine"	Harry Warren	Arthur Freed	
1941	"This Time the Dream's on Me"	Harold Arlen	Johnny Mercer	
1927	"Thou Swell"	Richard Rodgers	Lorenz Hart	
1930	"Three Little Words"	Harry Ruby	Bert Kalmar	
1931	"The Thrill is Gone"	Ray Henderson	Sammy Cahn	
1918	"Till We Meet Again"	Richard A. Whiting	Raymond B. Egan	
1947	"Time After Time"	Jule Styne	Sammy Cahn	
1930	"Time on My Hands"	Vincent Youmans	Harold Adamson and Mack Gordon	
1929	"Tiptoe Through the Tulips"	Joe Burke	Al Dubin	
1959	“Together (Wherever We Go)”	Jule Styne	Stephen Sondheim	
1948	"Too Darn Hot"	Cole Porter	Cole Porter	
1937	"Too Marvelous for Words"	Richard A. Whiting	Johnny Mercer	
1935	"Top Hat, White Tie and Tails"	Irving Berlin	Irving Berlin	
1913	"The Trail of the Lonesome Pine"	Harry Carroll	Ballard MacDonald	
1944	"The Trolley Song"	Hugh Martin	Ralph Blane	
1939	"Tuxedo Junction"	Erskine Hawkins, Bill Johnson, and Julian Dash	Buddy Feyne	
1938	"Two Sleepy People"	Hoagy Carmichael	Frank Loesser	
1925	"Ukulele Lady"	Richard A. Whiting	Gus Kahn	
1955	"Unchained Melody"	Alex North	Hy Zaret	
1932	"Underneath the Arches"	Bud Flanagan	Bud Flanagan and Reg Connelly	
1951	"Unforgettable"	Irving Gordon	Irving Gordon	
1936	"Until the Real Thing Comes Along"	Saul Chaplin	Sammy Cahn	
1934	"The Very Thought of You"	Ray Noble	Ray Noble	
1963	"Walk On By"	Burt Bacharach	Hal David	
1936	"The Way You Look Tonight"	Jerome Kern	Dorothy Fields	
1934	"What a Diff'rence a Day Makes"	María Grever	Stanley Adams	
1926	"What Can I Say After I Say I'm Sorry?"	Walter Donaldson	Abe Lyman	
1929	"What Is This Thing Called Love?"	Cole Porter	Cole Porter	
1923	"What'll I Do"	Irving Berlin	Irving Berlin	
1952	"When I Fall in Love"	Victor Young	Edward Heyman	
1912	"When I Lost You"	Irving Berlin	Irving Berlin	
1940	"When You Wish Upon a Star"	Leigh Harline	Ned Washington	
1937	"Where Are You?"	Jimmy McHugh	Harold Adamson	
1937	"Where or When"	Richard Rodgers	Lorenz Hart	
1937	"Whistle While You Work"	Frank Churchill	Larry Morey	
1942	"White Christmas"	Irving Berlin	Irving Berlin	
1923	"Who's Sorry Now?"	Ted Snyder	Harry Ruby and Bert Kalmar	
1968	"Wichita Lineman"	Jimmy Webb	Jimmy Webb	
1934	"Winter Wonderland"	Felix Bernard	Richard Bernhard Smith	
1957	"Witchcraft"	Cy Coleman	Carolyn Leigh	
1930	"With a Song in My Heart"	Richard Rodgers	Lorenz Hart	
1937	"With Plenty of Money and You"	Harry Warren	Al Dubin	
1929	"Without a Song"	Vincent Youmans	Billy Rose and Edward Eliscu	
1949	"A Wonderful Guy"	Richard Rodgers	Oscar Hammerstein II	
1930	"Would You Like to Take a Walk?"	Harry Warren	Mort Dixon and Billy Rose	
1925	"Yes Sir, That's My Baby"	Walter Donaldson	Gus Kahn	
1933	"Yesterdays"	Jerome Kern	Otto Harbach	
1934	"You and the Night and the Music"	Arthur Schwartz	Howard Dietz	
1935	"You Are My Lucky Star"	Nacio Herb Brown	Arthur Freed	
1932	"You Are Too Beautiful"	Richard Rodgers	Lorenz Hart	
1929	"You Do Something to Me"	Cole Porter	Cole Porter	
1938	"You Go to My Head"	J. Fred Coots	Haven Gillespie	
1946	"You Make Me Feel So Young"	Josef Myrow	Mack Gordon	
1938	"You Must Have Been a Beautiful Baby"	Harry Warren	Johnny Mercer	
1934	"You Oughta Be in Pictures"	Dana Suesse	Edward Heyman	
1940	"You Stepped Out of a Dream"	Nacio Herb Brown	Arthur Freed	
1928	"You Took Advantage of Me"	Richard Rodgers	Lorenz Hart	
1929	"You Were Meant for Me"	Nacio Herb Brown	Arthur Freed	
1934	"You'd Be So Easy to Love"	Cole Porter	Cole Porter	
1942	"You'd Be So Nice to Come Home To"	Cole Porter	Cole Porter	
1943	"You'll Never Know"	Harry Warren	Mack Gordon	
1945	"You'll Never Walk Alone"	Richard Rodgers	Oscar Hammerstein II	
1933	"Young and Healthy"	Harry Warren	Al Dubin	
1953	"Young at Heart"	Johnny Richards	Carolyn Leigh	
1949	"Younger Than Springtime"	Richard Rodgers	Oscar Hammerstein II	
1930	"You're Driving Me Crazy"	Walter Donaldson	Walter Donaldson	
1933	"You're Getting to Be a Habit with Me"	Harry Warren	Al Dubin	
1931	"You're My Everything"	Harry Warren	Mort Dixon and Joe Young	
1928	"You're the Cream in My Coffee"	Ray Henderson	Buddy DeSylva and Lew Brown	
1934	"You're the Top"	Cole Porter	Cole Porter	
1946	"Zip-a-Dee-Doo-Dah"	Allie Wrubel	Ray Gilbert	

== Revivals ==
In 1970, rock musician Ringo Starr surprised the public by releasing an album of Songbook songs from the 1920s, 1930s, and 1940s, Sentimental Journey. Reviews were mostly poor or even disdainful, but the album reached number 22 on the US Billboard 200 and number 7 in the UK Albums Chart, with sales of 500,000.

It's a lot of songs that were my initiation to music. It's all the tracks that, when my mother and my father came home from the pub out [of] their heads, they'd sing all these songs.

— Ringo Starr

Other pop singers who established themselves in the 1960s or later followed with albums reviving songs from the Great American Songbook, beginning with Harry Nilsson's A Little Touch of Schmilsson in the Night in 1973 and continuing into the 21st century. Linda Ronstadt (1983 through 1986), Rod Stewart (2002 through 2005), Bob Dylan (2015 through 2017) and Lady Gaga (2014 and 2021) made several such albums. Of Ronstadt's 1983 album, What's New, her first in a trilogy of standards albums recorded with arranger/conductor Nelson Riddle, Stephen Holden of The New York Times wrote:

What's New isn't the first album by a rock singer to pay tribute to the golden age of pop, but is ... the best and most serious attempt to rehabilitate an idea of pop that Beatlemania and the mass marketing of rock LPs for teen-agers undid in the mid-'60s. During the decade prior to Beatlemania, most of the great band singers and crooners of the '40s and '50s codified a half-century of American pop standards on dozens of albums, many of them now long out-of-print.

== See also ==
- Brill Building
- Great American Songbook Foundation
- Lounge music
- Show tunes
- Tin Pan Alley
- Traditional pop

== Notes ==
1. Including Willie Nelson with Stardust (1978), Dr. John with In a Sentimental Mood (1989), Brian Wilson with Brian Wilson Reimagines Gershwin (2010), Paul McCartney with Kisses on the Bottom (2012), Bob Dylan with Shadows in the Night (2015), Fallen Angels (2016), and Triplicate (2017), and James Taylor with American Standard (2020).
