= Somebody Loves You (1932 song) =

"Somebody Loves You" is a popular song.

The music was written by Peter DeRose and the lyrics by Charlie Tobias. The song was published in 1932.

One of the earliest recordings of the song was by Ted Lewis and his Band, recorded March 16, 1932 and released by Columbia under catalog number 2635-D. A British cover version was issued by Bob and Alf Pearson.

The song is now a standard, recorded by many artists. Among the best-known versions were recordings by Eddy Arnold and Dean Martin.
