= In a Shanty in Old Shanty Town =

Single by Ted Lewis and His Band
- Released: 1932
- Genre: Popular
- Length: 3:15
- Songwriters: Ira Schuster, Jack Little, Joe Young

Ted Lewis and His Band singles chronology
"Headin' for Better Times" (1932)	"In a Shanty in Old Shanty Town" (1932)	"My Woman!" (1932)

"In a Shanty in Old Shanty Town" is a popular song written by Ira Schuster and Jack Little with lyrics by Joe Young, published in 1932. Ted Lewis and His Band performed it in the film The Crooner in 1932. His version was released as a single and it went to #1, where it remained for 10 weeks.

== Composition ==
The Johnny Long and His Orchestra had a million seller of the song in 1946. This version was a slight revision of the Long band's 1940 version. Their version reached #13. Jerry Lee Lewis recorded a version in the winter of 1958/1959. Somethin' Smith and the Redheads re-charted the song in 1956 where it reached #27.

In the contemporary 'stock' dance-band orchestration published by B. Feldman & Co., sole agents for M. Witmark & Sons (arranged by Frank Skinner) credit is given thus: words by Joe Young and music by Little Jack Little and John Siras (an alias for Ira Schuster).
