= As Time Goes By (song) =

1931 jazz song written by Herman Hupfeld

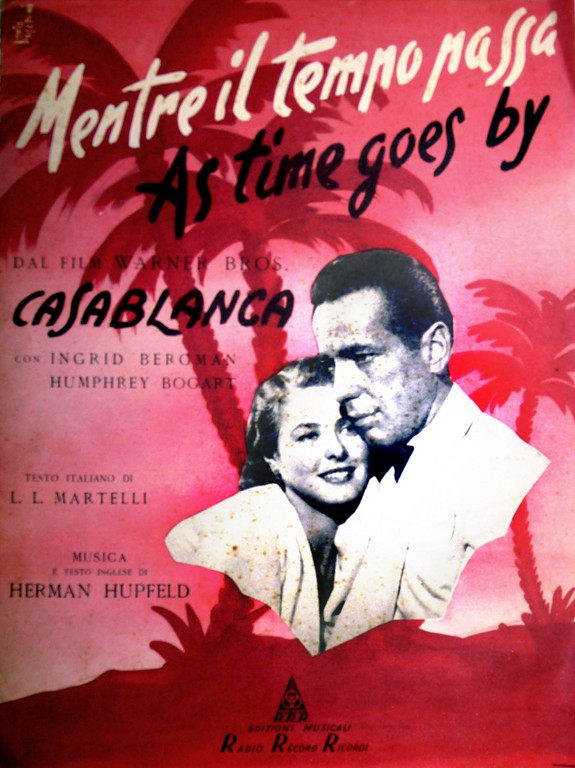

Song by Dooley Wilson
- Written: 1931
- Published: 1931 by Harms, Inc.
- Length: 2 minutes and 45 seconds
- Songwriter: Herman Hupfeld

"As Time Goes By" is a jazz song written by Herman Hupfeld in 1931. It became famous when it was featured in the 1942 film Casablanca, sung by Dooley Wilson as Sam. The song was voted No. 2 on the AFI's 100 Years...100 Songs special, commemorating the best songs in film (surpassed only by "Over the Rainbow" sung by Judy Garland).

The song was covered among others by Rudy Vallee, Billie Holiday, Jimmy Durante, Louis Armstrong, Frank Sinatra, Nancy Sinatra, Natalie Cole, Harry Nilsson, Carly Simon, Vera Lynn, Bob Dylan, Bryan Ferry and Josh Groban. It was also the title and theme song of the 1990s British romantic sitcom As Time Goes By. National Public Radio (NPR) included it in its "NPR 100", a 1999 list of the most important American musical works of the 20th century as compiled by NPR's music editors. The song is a popular reflection of nostalgia and often used in films and series reflecting this feeling. Since 1999, an instrumental version of the song's closing bars has accompanied the studio logo of many Warner Bros. Pictures, Warner Bros. Pictures Animation and Warner Bros. Television productions, in reference to the studio's production of Casablanca.

== Background ==
Herman Hupfeld wrote "As Time Goes By" for the Broadway musical Everybody's Welcome, which opened on October 31, 1931. In the original show, the song was sung by Frances Williams. It was first recorded by Rudy Vallée on July 25, 1931, for Victor Records, then also by Jacques Renard and his Orchestra on Brunswick Records and Fred Rich. In 1932, Binnie Hale recorded the song. Elisabeth Welch included it in her cabaret act soon after it was released. In terms of popularity at the time, the song was a modest hit.

The song was reintroduced in the 1942 film Casablanca, where it was sung by Sam, portrayed by Dooley Wilson. Sam's piano accompaniment was played by a studio pianist, Jean Vincent Plummer; Wilson was a drummer. The melody is heard throughout the film as a leitmotif. Wilson was unable to make a commercial recording of the song at the time due to the 1942–44 musicians' strike. Unable to record new versions of the song, RCA Victor reissued the 1931 recording by Rudy Vallée, which became a number one hit eleven years after it was originally released. Brunswick also reissued the 1931 Jacques Renard recording.

Hupfeld lived his whole life in Montclair, New Jersey, and was a regular customer at the Robin Hood Inn (now the Valley Regency), a tavern built in 1922 on Valley Road, then part of Upper Montclair. He spent many hours at the piano and wrote several of his songs in this tavern. A plaque on the second floor of the Valley Regency Catering Facility in Clifton, New Jersey, commemorates the song. He wrote more than 100 songs, including "Let's Put Out the Lights (and Go to Sleep)", and the popular Great Depression song "Are You Making Any Money?"

== Composition and lyrics ==
The song was originally published in the key of E♭ major. In the film, as sung and played by "Sam", it was recorded in D♭ major. It has since been played in several keys, commonly C major, but also B♭ major, as in Frank Sinatra's recording, and other keys including A major and E♭ major.

Like many later singers, Wilson in Casablanca starts with "You must remember this, a kiss is just a kiss...", singing only the verses and refrain ("As time goes by"). He entirely omits the intro that put those "fundamental things" into context: "This day and age we’re living in gives cause for apprehension, With speed and new invention and things like third dimension. Yet, we get a trifle weary with Mister Einstein’s theory, So we must get down to earth, at times relax, relieve the tension. No matter what the progress or what may yet be proved, The simple facts of life are such they cannot be removed.". At least one version moves the intro into the middle of the song.

== Charts ==
Wilson's version was commercially released in parts of the world in late 1977, including the UK, where it reached number 15 in January 1978, and Australia, where it peaked at number 86 in March 1978.

Chart (1978)	Peak position
Australia (Kent Music Report)	86
