= 1932 in country music =

This is a list of notable events in country music that took place in the year 1932.

== Events ==
1932 marked the lowest trough the recording industry would experience during the Great Depression, as sales tumbled to pre-1905 levels. In the United States, revenues went from 104 million units in 1927 to 6 million in 1932, and did not start to rebound until 1937.

== Top Hillbilly (Country) Recordings 1932 ==
The following songs were extracted from records included in Joel Whitburn's Pop Memories 1890-1954, record sales reported on the "Discography of American Historical Recordings" website, and other sources as specified. Numerical rankings are approximate, they are only used as a frame of reference.

Rank	Artist	Title	Label	Recorded	Released	Chart Positions
1	Jimmie Rodgers with Lani McIntire's Hawaiians	"Why Should I Be Lonely"	Victor 23609	June 30, 1930	December 4, 1931	US Hillbilly 1932 #1, 20,506 sales
2	Gene Autry and Jimmy Long	"That Silver Haired Daddy Of Mine"	Banner 32349	October 29, 1931	January 1932	US Hillbilly 1932 #2
3	Jimmie Rodgers	"Gambling Polka Dot Blues"	Victor 23636	June 15, 1931	February 26, 1932	US Hillbilly 1932 #3, 13,265 sales
4	Jimmie Rodgers	"Roll Along, Kentucky Moon"	Victor 23651	February 2, 1932	April 8, 1932	US BB 1932 #223, US #18 for 1 week, 1 total weeks, US Hillbilly 1932 #4, 12,448 sales
5	Dick Robertson	"Twenty-One Years (Is a Long Time)"	Victor 23616	October 22, 1931	December 1931	US Hillbilly 1932 #5, 11,225 sales
6	Jimmie Rodgers	"My Time Ain’t Long"	Victor 23669	February 4, 1932	May 20, 1932	US Hillbilly 1932 #6, 9,578 sales
7	Kentucky Ramblers	"Ginseng Blues"	Broadway 8271	September 10, 1930	October 1932	US Hillbilly 1932 #7
8	Renfro Valley Boys	"Who’s Gonna Shoe Your Pretty Little Feet"	Paramount 3321	December 6, 1931	June 1932	US Hillbilly 1932 #8
9	Renfro Valley Boys	"My Renfro Valley Home"	Paramount 3315	December 6, 1931	February 1932	US Hillbilly 1932 #9
10	Jimmie Rodgers	"Blue Yodel No. 10 (Ground Hog Rootin' In My Back Yard)"	Victor 21757	October 24, 1931	January 1932	US Hillbilly 1932 #10, 7,746 sales
11	Stuart Hamblen	"My Mary"	Victor 23685	November 13, 1931	June 11, 1932	US Hillbilly 1932 #11
12	Delmore Brothers	"Alabama Lullaby"	Columbia 15724	October 28, 1931	December 1931	US Hillbilly 1932 #12
13	Jimmie Rodgers	"Rock All Our Babies To Sleep"	Victor 23721	August 11, 1932	October 21, 1932	US Hillbilly 1932 #13, 6,241 sales
14	Jimmie Rodgers	"Down The Old Road To Home"	Victor 23711	February 5, 1932	September 23, 1932	US Hillbilly 1932 #14, 6,078 sales
15	Carter Family	"Motherless Children"	Victor 23641	November 2, 1929	March 30, 1932	US Hillbilly 1932 #15
16	Carson Robison Trio	"Twenty One Years"	Perfect 12759	October 23, 1931	December 1931	US Hillbilly 1932 #16
17	Carter Family	"Room In Heaven For Me"	Victor 23618	November 24, 1930	January 26, 1932	US Hillbilly 1932 #17, 5,088 sales
18	Jimmie Rodgers	"She Was Happy Till She Met You"	Victor 21757	June 12, 1932	December 2, 1932	US Hillbilly 1932 #18
19	Carter Family	"Weary Prodigal Son"	Victor 23626	May 25, 1931	January 17, 1932	US Hillbilly 1932 #19, 4,329 sales
20	Carter Family	"I Never Loved but One"	Victor 23656	February 24, 1932	April 8, 1932	US Hillbilly 1932 #20, 3,360 sales
21	Renfro Valley Boys	"Twenty-One Years"	Paramount 3311	December 6, 1931	January 1932	US Hillbilly 1932 #21

== Births ==
- January 31 – Rick Hall, songwriter and producer (died 2018).
- February 3 – Bill Mack, country music radio personality best known for hosting Country Crossroads, and songwriter ("Blue" and "Drinking Champagne").(died 2020)
- February 25 – Faron Young, honky tonk singer whose popularity spanned the 1950s through mid-1970s (died 1996).
- February 26 – Johnny Cash, vastly influential in all genres of American popular music, most notably country (died 2003).
- April 14 – Loretta Lynn, leading country singer-songwriter of the 1960s and 1970s (died 2022).
- August 8 – Mel Tillis, singer-songwriter who overcame a speech impediment to become one of the genre's biggest stars of the 1950s through 1980s (died 2017).
- September 8 – Patsy Cline, one of the most influential singers in American popular music, first female country singer to cross over to the pop charts (died 1963).
- October 11 – Dottie West, female vocalist who successfully transferred from the Nashville Sound (of the 1960s) to more straight-ahead pop country during the late 1970s and early 1980s (died 1991).
- November 6 – Paul English, drummer for Willie Nelson (died 2020).
- November 13 – Buddy Killen, record producer and music publishing owner (died 2006).
