= Jack Little (songwriter) =

American singer (1899–1956)

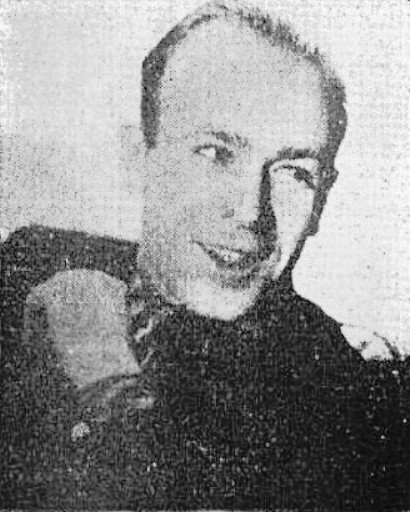
Little Jack Little c. 1943

Jack Little (born John Leonard; May 30, 1899 (Note: Another source gives his birth date as May 28, 1902.) – April 9, 1956), sometimes credited as Little Jack Little, was a British-born American composer, singer, pianist, actor, and songwriter whose songs were featured in several movies. He is not to be confused with the burlesque comedian also known as "Little" Jack Little, who stood 4 feet 5 inches (135 cm) tall.

== Early years ==
Little was born in the Silvertown section of London, but moved to the United States when he was nine years old, growing up in Waterloo, Iowa. He was educated in pre-med classes at the University of Iowa, where he played in and organized the university band.

== Career ==
Early in his career, Little worked at radio stations, including WSAI and WLW, both in Cincinnati, Ohio. He had a 15-minute daily program (originating from WLW) on NBC radio in the early 1930s.

Little toured the country with an orchestra, appearing in hotels, night clubs, and on the radio. In one such touring appearance on radio, at WOC in Davenport, Iowa, Little "made a new endurance record for himself ... when he remained on the air three hours and sixteen minutes ... [and] sang fifty-one songs in answer to thousands of requests." He collaborated musically with Tommie Malie, Dick Finch, John Siras, and Joe Young.

In 1928 he joined ASCAP. From 1933 to 1937, he recorded prolifically, starting on Bluebird, Columbia, and finally ARC, playing in a light society dance band style. He often worked with musical director Mitchell Ayres. His compositions include "Jealous, I Promise You", "A Shanty in Old Shanty Town" and "You're a Heavenly Thing". Details of his chart success per Joel Whitburn are given below.

== Chart successes ==
Year	Song	Peak chart position
1934	"You Oughta Be in Pictures"	2
1934	"Old Roses"	12
1934	"Stay As Sweet As You Are"	16
1934	"June in January"	7
1935	"Little Boy Blue"	13
1935	"Lullaby of Broadway"	5
1935	"I'm Goin' Shopping with You"	16
1935	"I'm in the Mood for Love"	1
1935	"I Wished on the Moon"	13
1935	"On Treasure Island"	4
1935	"No Other One"	7
1935	"Where Am I? (Am I in Heaven?)"	7
1936	"I'm Shooting High"	15
1937	"It's Swell of You"	17

== Recognition ==
Little has a star at 6618 Hollywood Boulevard in the radio section of the Hollywood Walk of Fame. It was dedicated on February 8, 1960.

== Personal life ==
He was married to Thea Hellman, who died in 1940; they had two children.

== Death ==
Little died in his sleep on April 9, 1956, at his home in Hollywood, Florida, after suffering from hepatitis for some time.
