= Everybody's Welcome =

1931 musical

Everybody's Welcome is a musical comedy with a book by Lambert Carroll, lyrics by Irving Kahal, and music by Sammy Fain. The musical has two acts and a prologue. Based on Up Pops the Devil by Frances Goodrich and Albert Hackett, the musical's plot centers on an un-married couple, Ann Cathway and Steve Merrick, living in Greenwich Village. The musical is best known for originating the song "As Time Goes By", with music and lyrics by Herman Hupfeld. The song was part of the "additional material" provided for the musical by songwriters other than Kahal and Fain. It is the only music from this work that has not been lost.

The musical ran at the Shubert Theater in New York City from October 31, 1931, to February 13, 1932, for a total of 139 performances. The musical starred Harriette Lake as Ann Cathway, Oscar Shaw as Steve Merrick, Ann Pennington as Louella Carroll, Jack Sheehan as Biny Hatfield and Frances Williams as Polly Bascom. It was directed by William Mollison and choreographed by William Holbrook.

== Plot ==
Setting: The rehearsal hall in "Biny" Hatfield's Dancing Academy, New York City; a studio apartment in Greenwich Village; and Proxy's Theatre, Broadway.

Steve, an aspiring novelist, is suffering from writer's block. His live-in girlfriend Ann is a former chorus girl who decides to go back to work on the stage in order to give her partner space to work on his writing. Both eventually come to suspect the other of having an affair. Eventually their problems resolve after Ann announces she is pregnant with their child.

== Songs ==
Prologue

- One in a Million – Steve Merrick and Girls

Act 1

- All Wrapped Up in You (Lyrics by Mack Gordon and Harold Adamson; music by Harry Revel) – Steve and Ann Cathway
- Pie Eyed Piper – Polly Bascom, Girls and Boys
- Ta, Ta, Old Bean (Lyrics by Edward Eliscu; music by Manning Sherwin) – Steve, Ann, Polly, and Biny Hatfield
- As Time Goes By (Music and Lyrics by Herman Hupfeld) – Polly
- Even As You and I – Steve and Ann
- Even As You and I (Reprise) – Steve and Ann

Act 2

- Feather in a Breeze – Louella Carroll, Girls and Boys
- Lease in My Heart – Steve and Ann
- Lease in My Heart (Reprise) – Steve, Louella, a Drunk, Boys and Girls
- Nature Played a Dirty Trick on You (Lyrics by Arthur Lippmann and Milton Pascal; music by Sherwin) – Polly and Biny
- As Time Goes By (Reprise) – Polly and Biny
- Even As You and I (Reprise) – Steve and Ann
- I Shot the Works (Lyrics by Pascal and Lippmann; music by Sherwin) – Polly
- Four Grecians – Biny, George Kent, a Drunk and Buddy Hill
- Is Rhythm Necessary? – Polly, Louella, Girls and Boys
