= Snuggled on Your Shoulder (Cuddled in Your Arms) =

Popular song by Carmen Lombardo and Joe Young

"Snuggled on Your Shoulder (Cuddled in Your Arms)" is a popular song with music by Carmen Lombardo and lyrics by Joe Young, published in 1932.

== 1932 recordings ==
- Bing Crosby recorded the song on January 21, 1932 and it was released on Brunswick 6248. His version reached the charts of the day peaking at No. 11. Crosby also featured the song in the 1932 Mack Sennett short Sing, Bing, Sing.
- Eddy Duchin and his Central Park Casino Orchestra (vocal: Lew Sherwood). This was the most successful recording of the song reaching No. 7 in the 1932 charts.
- Arthur Jarrett
- Isham Jones and his orchestra. Their version charted at No. 16 in 1932.
- Kate Smith's version reached the charts in 1932, peaking at No. 10.
- Al Bowlly recorded with the Savoy Hotel Orpheans on 11 May 1932 and released on Columbia (UK) CB458.

== Later recorded versions ==
- Doris Day (album The Love Album, 1967).
- Julie London (album Make Love to Me, 1957)
