= Waltzing in a Dream =

1932 song recorded by Bing Crosby

1932 sheet music cover, Olman Music, New York.

"Waltzing in a Dream" is a 1932 song recorded by Bing Crosby. The lyrics were written by Bing Crosby and Ned Washington. The music was composed by Victor Young.

== History ==
Crosby recorded the song in Chicago on April 23, 1932 with Isham Jones and His Orchestra and it was released as a Brunswick 78 single. The recording reached no. 6 on the pop singles chart in the U.S., with a chart run of eleven weeks.

Guy Lombardo also enjoyed chart success with the song in 1932. Other recordings were by Enric Madriguera for Columbia Records (catalog No. 2735D), and by Ray Noble who recorded the song in London for His Master's Voice with vocals by Al Bowlly.

== Sources ==
- Grudens, Richard (2002). Bing Crosby – Crooner of the Century. Celebrity Profiles Publishing Co.. ISBN 1-57579-248-6.
- Macfarlane, Malcolm. Bing Crosby – Day By Day. Scarecrow Press, 2001.
- Osterholm, J. Roger. Bing Crosby: A Bio-Bibliography. Greenwood Press, 1994.
