= Say It Isn't So (Irving Berlin song) =

Single by George Olsen and His Orchestra
- Released: 1932
- Genre: Popular
- Label: Victor Records
- Songwriter: Irving Berlin

George Olsen and His Orchestra singles chronology
"Please" (1932)	"Say It Isn't So" (1932)	"There's Nothing the Matter with Me" (1932)

"Say It Isn't So" is a popular torch song by Irving Berlin, published in 1932. The song was written when Berlin was suffering a loss of confidence following several setbacks, and he initially placed the song in a drawer, feeling that it would not be successful. However, one of Berlin's employees, Max Winslow, heard it, and on his own initiative, took it to Rudy Vallée, who was then a major star on radio. Vallee sang it on his radio show and it became an immediate hit.

George Olsen and His Orchestra released a version in 1932 that reached No. 1, and other popular versions in 1932 were by Ozzie Nelson, Connee Boswell and Vallée. Alfredo Antonini and his orchestra collaborated with Victoria Cordova and John Serry Sr. to record the work for Muzak in the 1940s.

== Cover versions ==
The song has been recorded many times by different artists. Notable versions include:

- Connee Boswell (1932, No. 10)
- Bing Crosby recorded the song for his album Bing Crosby's Treasury - The Songs I Love (1968 version).
- Ozzie Nelson and His Orchestra (1932, #8)
- Layton & Johnstone - Columbia DB982 (1932)
- Annette Hanshaw - Banner – 32563 (1932)
- Bob and Alf Pearson - Imperial 2816 (1933)
- Julie London on her 1955 LP album, Julie Is Her Name Vol 1.
- Dinah Washington for her album In the Land of Hi-Fi (1956).
- Teddi King - A 1957 recording for a RCA-Victor, and'Round Midnight (2008)
- Andy Williams for his album, Lonely Street (1959).
- Stan Kenton - The Romantic Approach (1961)
- Aretha Franklin for her album Laughing on the Outside (1963)
- Stacey Kent - The Boy Next Door (2003)
- Billie Holiday - Lady Sings the Blues (2010 box set)
- Lucy Maunder for her album, Songs in the Key of Black (2012).
- The Caretaker, sampling the song for a track of his last release Everywhere at the End of Time (2016–2019).
