= Gary Brewer and the Kentucky Ramblers =

- Also known as: GBKR
- Origin: West Point, Kentucky.
- Genres: Americana, Bluegrass, Bluegrass-Gospel, Old-Time Mountain Music
- Years active: 1980 to present
- Label: SGM Records
- Members: Gary Brewer; Gary "Wayne" Brewer Jr. Mason Brewer; Cody Pearman
- Website: https://www.brewgrass.com

Gary Brewer and the Kentucky Ramblers are a family band formed in 1980 in West Point, Kentucky. They play a fusion of multiple American-roots music styles called "Brewgrass".

The group celebrated its 40th anniversary in 2020 releasing album "40th Anniversary Celebration" during the COVID-19 pandemic. 40th Anniversary Celebration spent 16 weeks at #1 and 72 weeks in the top 5 on the Billboard Bluegrass Albums chart. It was also included on the Billboard 2021 all-genre ‘Top Current Albums Sales’ year-end chart between artists Rob Zombie and Ariana Grande.

The band was later submitted to the 64th Grammy Awards initial round for “Best New Artist”.

Following their 2020 release, the band collaborated with Americana singer-songwriter Jim Lauderdale for the single "Pass Along The Good", co-written by Gary Brewer and Jim Lauderdale.

== Members and roles ==
Gary Brewer – Lead Acoustic Guitar/Old-time Banjo/Electric Guitar/Vocals

Wayne Brewer – Upright bass/Fiddle/Electric Guitar/Vocals

Mason Brewer – Mandolin/Upright Bass/Percussion/Vocals

Cody Pearman – Banjo

== SGM Records ==
SGM Records was founded by Gary Brewer in 1988 as an independent record label. At first, the label was used to re-release Brewer's back catalog, but he later decided to take advantage of his complete creative control and release new recordings as well. Gary's oldest son Wayne Brewer became CEO of SGM in 2012; later followed by his wife becoming COO in 2015. Since SGM's launch, Gary Brewer and the Kentucky Ramblers have been the main focus, releasing 29 studio albums, but individual solo projects by the Ramblers & their family, including Gary Brewer's grandfather, Finley J. “Pap” Brewer Sr., Gary's father Finley J. Brewer Jr., Wayne Brewer, and Gary's youngest son Mason Brewer. Genres and artists outside of Bluegrass are included on the label with more to be added.

=== Global distribution deal ===
In April 2022, Gary Brewer and the Kentucky Ramblers signed with Bob Frank Entertainment (BFE) for global distribution through The Orchard; teaming up with SGM Records for GBKR's back catalog and future releases.

== Brewgrass Entertainment Studio ==
Located in the SGM Records warehouse near the Louisville, KY area, the Brewgrass Entertainment Studio was built in 2020 by Gary Brewer and his sons. Gary collected vintage microphones throughout his career in the hopes of opening a studio of his own. His collection of Neumann, Shure, Telefunken, and RCA equipment was added to the studio, which is primarily for private use; others may record by invitation.

== Event production ==
=== Friday Night Bluegrass Concert Series ===
In 2014, Gary Brewer and the Kentucky Ramblers took over hosting the Friday Night Bluegrass concert series in Shepherdsville, KY. This series highlights local, national, and regional acts each week. Gary Brewer and the Kentucky Ramblers perform in each show themselves and feature a guest band. An annual occurrence, the shows run from November to April.

=== Bluegrass Summer Nights Concert Series ===
In addition to hosting a winter concert series, Gary Brewer and the Kentucky Ramblers connected with the Outlet Shoppes of the Bluegrass and created a summer concert series called Bluegrass Summer Nights. Free concerts are offered during the summer months for shoppers. Just like the Friday Night Bluegrass show, Gary Brewer has local, national, and regional touring bands as guests on the Bluegrass Summer Nights lineup.

=== Shin-dig in the Park Music Festival ===
Among producing other events, Gary Brewer and the Kentucky Ramblers host a bi-annual music festival called Shin-dig in the Park. It's located in Shepherdsville, KY at the Shepherdsville City Park. The music festival takes place in Spring and Fall, and the lineup includes artists of multiple genres (Bluegrass, Country, Americana, Rock, Gospel, and more). It is a free community event.

=== Brewgrass Entertainment (music venue) ===
Due to the success of their Winter and Summer concert series, Gary Brewer and the Kentucky Ramblers partnered with the Outlet Shoppes of the Bluegrass transforming a former retail space into a live music venue inside of Kentucky's largest outlet mall (Brewgrass Entertainment). Running from November 2019 – April 2020, as an artist residency; and it acted as the official kick-off to Gary Brewer and the Kentucky Ramblers 40th Anniversary celebration tour. Keeping live music in their home state of Kentucky is important to them for now and future generations. Brewgrass Entertainment (Music Venue): an intimate style venue offering guest groups from various genres (Bluegrass, Country, Americana, Gospel, and more).

=== Deep Roots Music Fest ===
Gary Brewer & the Kentucky Ramblers and their production company, Brewgrass Entertainment partnered with the City of Louisville (KY), Louisville Parks and Recreation, & the Iroquois Amphitheater for a free community event. Deep Roots Music Fest featured former Foreigner lead singer Johnny Edwards, America's Got Talent Season 11 finalists Linkin Bridge, and special guest CJ Sparks. Gary Brewer & the Kentucky Ramblers headlined the event. The goal of the event was to bring healing to the community through their mutual love of various music and diversity in Louisville. Deep Roots Music Fest took place on Saturday, June 18, 2022, at the Iroquois Amphitheater.

== Album release highlights ==
=== "Vintage Country Revival" CD (2018) ===
Gary Brewer is a bluegrass artist who released an acoustic Country album including 13 tracks of some of the top classic Country hits (all performed by Gary Brewer and the Kentucky Ramblers). Among Bye Bye Love, Good Hearted Woman, T For Texas, Oh Lonesome Me, and various others, John Prine's Paradise is performed as a duet by Gary and teen country prodigy, EmiSunshine. "Vintage Country Revival" was entered on the initial Grammy Awards ballot for Best Americana Album and Best American-Roots Performance.

=== "40th Anniversary Celebration" CD (2020) ===
Gary Brewer released an anniversary album. The "40th Anniversary Celebration" feature performances from Sam Bush, The Travelin' McCourys, Russell Moore among others.

The lead single "Goin' Up Shell Creek" premiered on American Songwriter on March 23, 2020. It has topped the APD Global Radio Charts for almost a month. The album received the #1 spot on the Billboard Bluegrass Albums Chart, a first for Gary Brewer and the Kentucky Ramblers.

== Proclamations and dedications ==
=== Gary Brewer Day (Shepherdsville, KY) ===
In recognition of his 40th anniversary and the success of the "40th Anniversary Celebration" CD, Monday, October 26, 2020, was declared 'Gary Brewer Day' by Mayor Curtis Hockenbury and the City of Shepherdsville.

=== 'Gary Brewer & the Kentucky Ramblers Pavilion' Dedication ===
The City of Shepherdsville and Mayor Hockenbury dedicated the Shepherdsville City Park/Frank E. Simon Pavilion to Gary Brewer & the Kentucky Ramblers on October 10, 2021, during their 2021 Fall Shin-dig in the Park Music Festival.

=== GBKR honored by City of Louisville (KY) ===
On October 16, 2021, Mayor Greg Fischer held a press conference with an official proclamation to congratulate Gary Brewer & the Kentucky Ramblers on their 40th anniversary and their recent album's success. The Mayor had been aware of the group and Brewgrass Entertainment, but they captured his attention at their September 2021 Waterfront Wednesday show where they captivated a 20,000+ crowd with their variety show performance.
