= Ted Lewis (musician) =

American entertainer and musician (1890–1971)

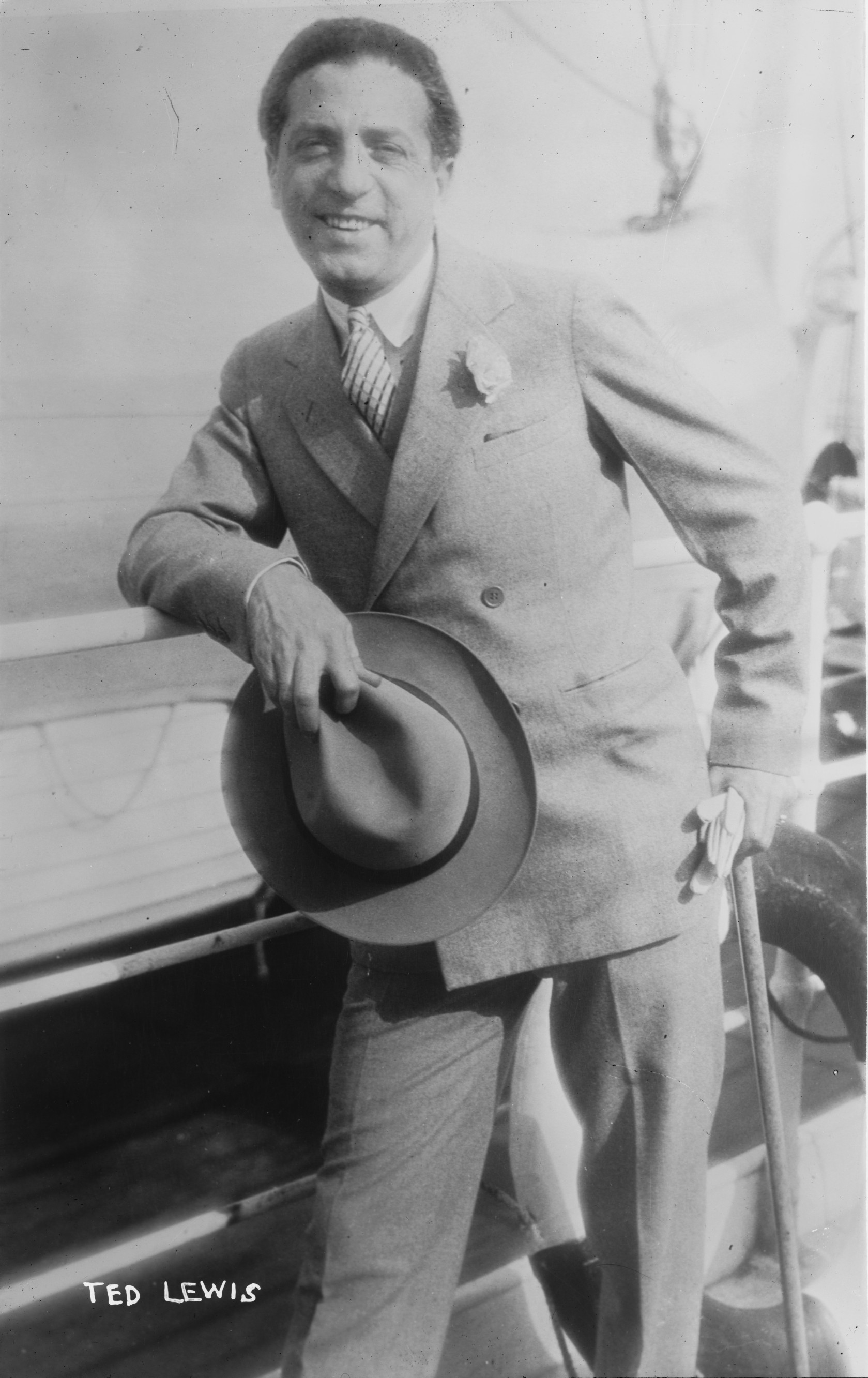

Background information
- Born: Theodore Leopold Friedman; June 6, 1890; Circleville, Ohio, U.S.
- Died: August 25, 1971 (aged 81) New York City, U.S.
- Genres: Jazz
- Occupations: Musician, bandleader, singer, entertainer
- Instrument: Clarinet
- Years active: 1913–1971
- Formerly of: Earl Fuller's Famous Jazz Band

Ted Lewis (June 6, 1890 – August 25, 1971) was an American entertainer, bandleader, singer, and musician. He was well known for his catchphrase "Is everybody happy?" He fronted a band and touring stage show that presented a combination of hot jazz, comedy, and nostalgia that was a hit with the American public before and after World War II.

== Early life ==
Lewis was born Theodore Leopold Friedman in Circleville, Ohio, to Pauline and Benjamin Friedman. His father ran Friedman’s Bazaar, a ladies' bargain store in Circleville. Lewis went on a street car every night to play in the high school band in Chillicothe, Ohio. Lewis, who was raised Jewish, joined an Episcopal church to sing in the choir next to a girl he liked. Lewis was fired from Henry Goldsmith's music store in Columbus, Ohio because whenever he demonstrated a clarinet for a customer people thought he had gone crazy. His brother Edgar Harrison (C.E. 1913) went to Ohio State University.

== Career ==
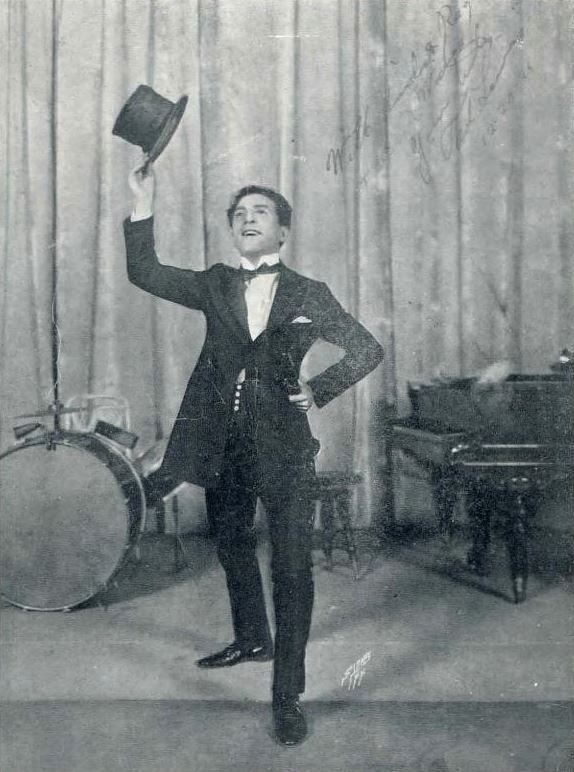
Lewis in 1922.

Lewis was one of the first Northern musicians to imitate the style of New Orleans jazz musicians who came to New York in the 1910s. He first recorded in 1917 with Earl Fuller's Jazz Band, then engaged at Rector's restaurant in Manhattan, a band which was attempting to copy the sound of the city's newest sensation, the Original Dixieland Jass Band, which was playing at Reisenweber's restaurant in New York City.

Although the piccolo was the first instrument Lewis learned, he also played the C-melody saxophone but was known principally as a clarinetist throughout his long career. His primary instrument was a B♭ Albert System clarinet.

Based on his earliest recordings, Lewis did not seem able to do much on the clarinet other than trill in its upper register. Promoting one recording the Victor catalog stated: "The sounds as of a dog in his dying anguish are from Ted Lewis' clarinet". As his career gained momentum he refined his style under the influence of the first New Orleans clarinetists to relocate in New York, Larry Shields, Alcide Nunez, and Achille Baquet.

By 1919, Lewis was leading his own band with whom he starred in the Broadway musical revue The Greenwich Village Follies of 1919. He had a recording contract with Columbia Records, which marketed him as their answer to the Original Dixieland Jass Band that recorded for Victor records. For a time (as the company did with Paul Whiteman) Columbia gave him a special record label featuring his picture.

At the start of the 1920s, he was being promoted as one of the leading lights of the mainstream form of jazz popular at the time. Although Lewis's clarinet style became increasingly corny, he certainly knew what good clarinet playing sounded like, for he hired musicians like Benny Goodman, Jimmy Dorsey, Frank Teschemacher, and Don Murray to play clarinet in his band. Over the years his band also included jazz greats Muggsy Spanier on trumpet and George Brunies on trombone. Ted Lewis's band was second only to the Paul Whiteman band in popularity during the early 1920s, and arguably played a more authentic form of jazz with less pretension than Whiteman.

Lewis recorded for Columbia from 1919 to 1933. Subsequently, he recorded for Decca from 1934 through the 1940s. In 1932, Lewis recorded "In a Shanty in Old Shanty Town", which he had performed in the film The Crooner with his orchestra. The recording reached No. 1 in radio polls and remained there for 10 weeks.

One of Lewis's most memorable songs was "Me and My Shadow" with which he frequently closed his act. Around 1928, Lewis noticed an African-American usher named Eddie Chester mimicking his movements during his act. He hired Chester to follow him on stage as his shadow during "Me and My Shadow". Chester was the first of five African-American shadows, the most famous being Charles "Snowball" Whittier, whom Lewis would address on stage as "Charlie". Thus Ted Lewis was one of the first prominent white entertainers to showcase African-American performers (arguably in stereotypical ways) on stage, on film, and eventually on network television.

Ted Lewis and His Orchestra was one of the featured acts at the 1939 Golden Gate International Exposition – Pageant of the Pacific on Treasure Island (Sunday, August 13, 1939, Program of Special Attractions and Events indicates that the Ted Lewis Orchestra performed from 2:45 to 3:45 p.m. and from 5:00 to 6:00 p.m. in the Temple Compound and from 8:30 to 11:30 p.m. in the Treasure Island Music Hall for a free dance).

Lewis's band continued to play in the same general style throughout the Great Depression, but it was essentially the musical backdrop for his act as a showman. He remained successful during an era when many bands broke up. Through it all he retained his famous catchphrases Is everybody happy? and Yessir! His mannerisms were so familiar that nightclub comedians would imitate him, including Harry Ritz of the Ritz Brothers and Jackie Gleason. Lewis was occasionally caricatured in Warner Brothers cartoons, as in A Great Big Bunch of You (1932), Speaking of the Weather (1937), and Person to Bunny (1960).

Lewis adopted a battered top hat for sentimental, hard-luck tunes; he called himself "The High-Hatted Tragedian of Song". Frequently he would stray from song lyrics, improvising patter around them. This gave the effect of Lewis "speaking" the song spontaneously: "When ma' baby... when ma' baby smiles at me... gee, what a wonderful, wonderful light that comes to her eyes... look at that light, folks..."

== Films ==
Lewis and his band appeared in a few early-talkie movie musicals in 1929, notably the Warner Brothers revue Show of Shows. The first of several films (1929, 1941, and 1943) titled with Lewis's catchphrase, Is Everybody Happy? also premiered in 1929, while 1935 saw Lewis and his band performing several numbers in the film Here Comes the Band.

In 1941 the band was recruited at the last minute, along with the Andrews Sisters, to furnish musical numbers for the Abbott and Costello comedy Hold That Ghost, released by Universal Studios on August 6, 1941. Musical numbers cut from the feature were released by Universal separately on September 3, 1941 in a short subject titled Is Everybody Happy?

In 1943 Columbia Pictures mounted a feature-length biographical film of Lewis—yet again titled Is Everybody Happy?—with actor Michael Duane portraying the bandleader and lip synching to Lewis's recordings.

True to his vaudeville beginnings, he created a visual as well as a musical act. His physical presence with props like his top hat, white-tipped cane, and clarinet, combined with bits of visual humor and dancing, were as important to him and as crucial to his popularity as was his music.

== Later career ==
Lewis kept his band together through the 1950s and continued to make appearances in Las Vegas and on television, appearing as the mystery guest on What's My Line?, the guest of honor on This Is Your Life, and an interview subject on Person to Person in the 1950s, and Hollywood Palace and other guest appearances in the 1960s and early 1970s.

== Personal life ==
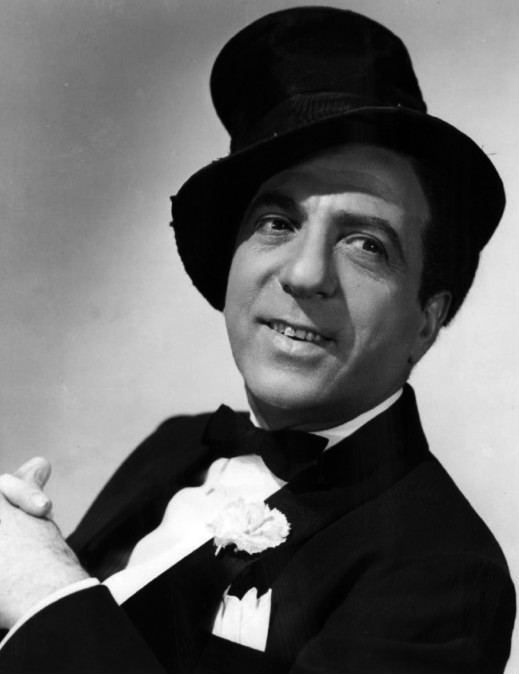
Lewis in 1951.

Lewis married Adah Becker (1897 – May 31, 1981) in 1915. She was a ballerina when Ted met her earlier that year in Rochester, New York. Only six weeks later they were married in three separate ceremonies on the same day, first by a justice of the peace, next by a rabbi, and finally on stage that night. They remained married for 56 years until Ted's death. Adah gave up her dance career to become his secretary and business manager. Ted and Adah moved into a 15-room apartment overlooking New York City's Central Park, and remained there for the rest of their lives.

Lewis died in his sleep in New York on August 25, 1971, of lung failure at age 81. Following a Jewish funeral service in New York City, his body was brought to Circleville, where thousands walked past his coffin. Rabbi Jerome D. Folkman officiated and remarked: "The song has ended, but the memory lingers on." The burial was held at the local Forest Cemetery. Lewis's stone in the family plot has his famous hat and cane inscribed upon it. His wife Adah, who died on May 31, 1981, rests beside him.

Upon his death, the City of New York, Yale and Harvard Universities, and the Smithsonian Institution asked Adah for his memorabilia. She politely declined, saying Ted wanted everything to come back to the "Capital of the World", Circleville, Ohio. She opened The Ted Lewis Museum, a modest storefront located across the street from where he was born on June 5, 1977. Celebrities, relatives, friends, and Ted Lewis admirers attended the dedication. A theatre within the museum allows visitors to see Ted Lewis's TV and movie performances.

Ohio Historical Marker Number 4-65 "Ted Lewis" is north of the picnic shelter in Ted Lewis Park, Circleville, Ohio; 39° 36.51′ N, 82° 56.644′ W.

== Gallery ==
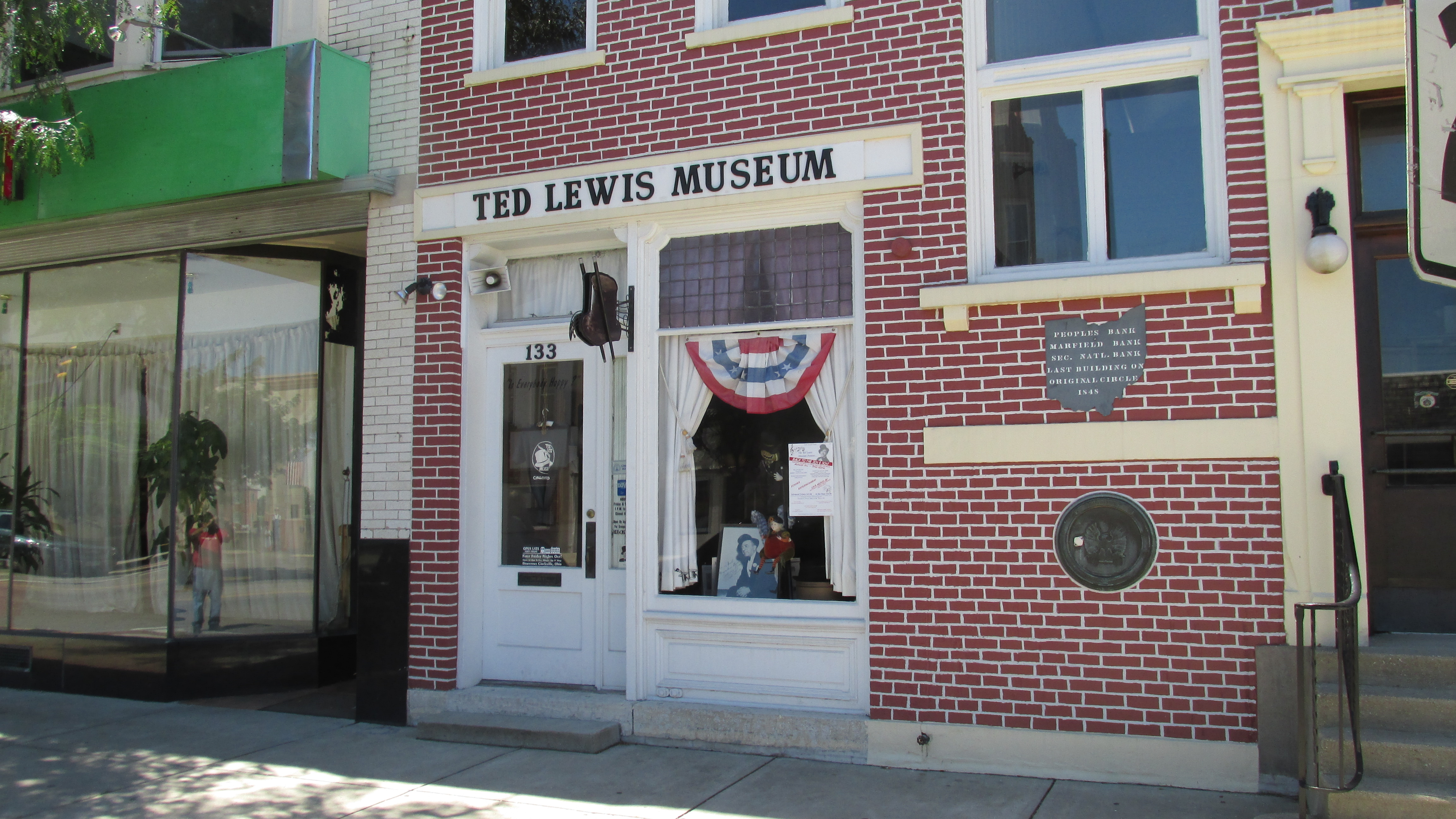
Ted Lewis Museum at 133 West Main Street in Circleville, Ohio.

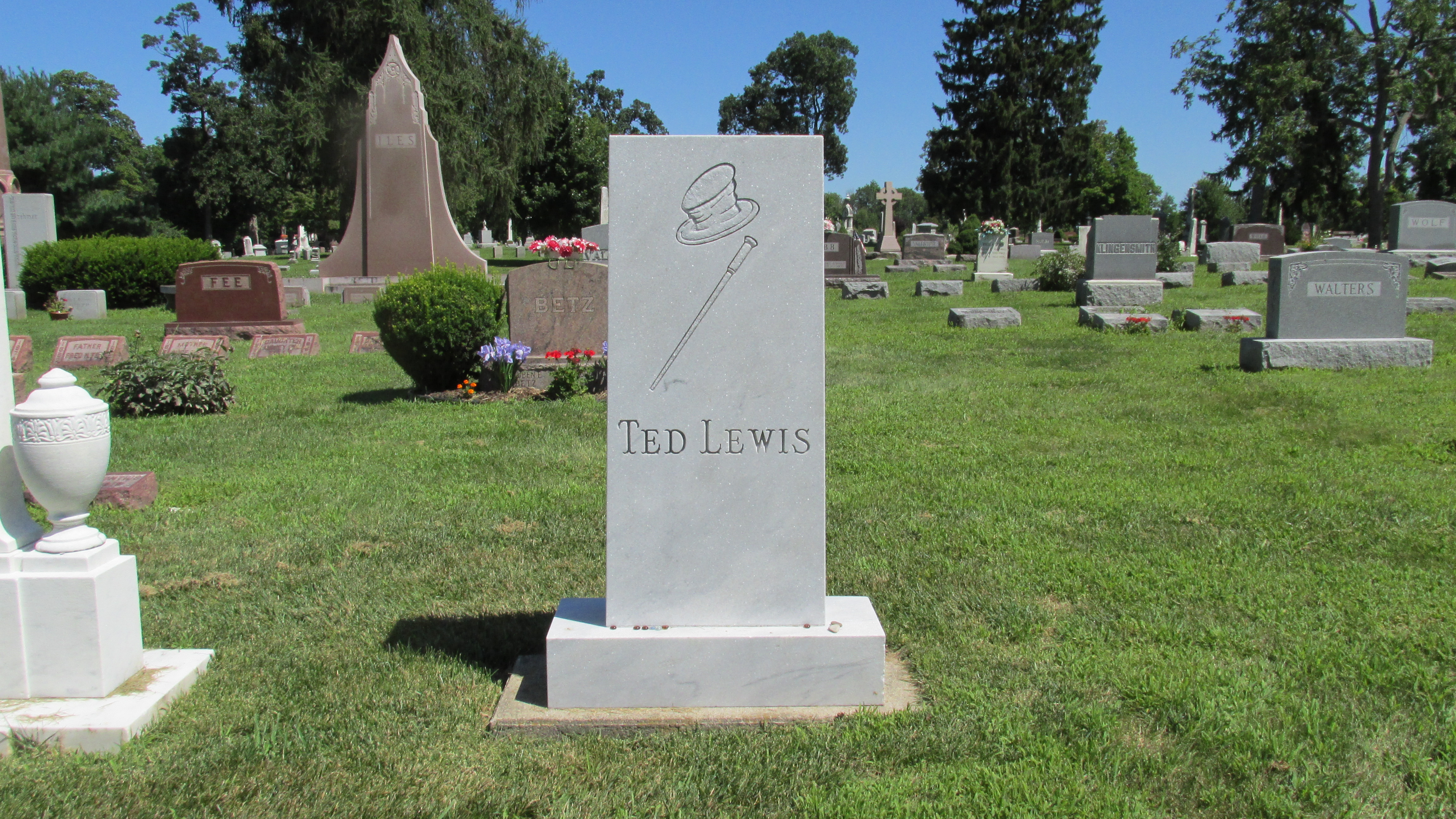
Ted Lewis headstone at Forest Cemetery in Circleville, Ohio.

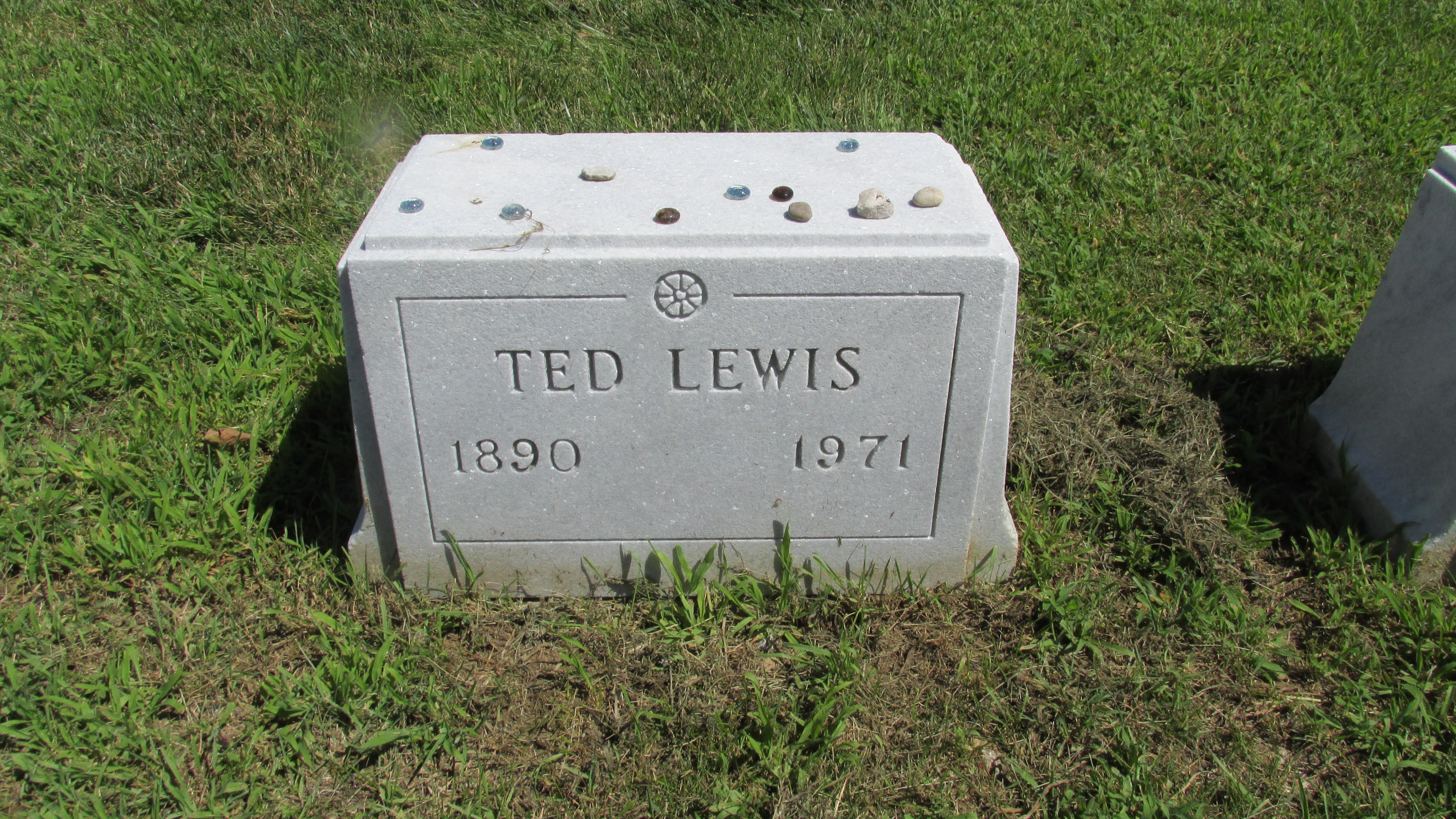
Ted Lewis grave marker.

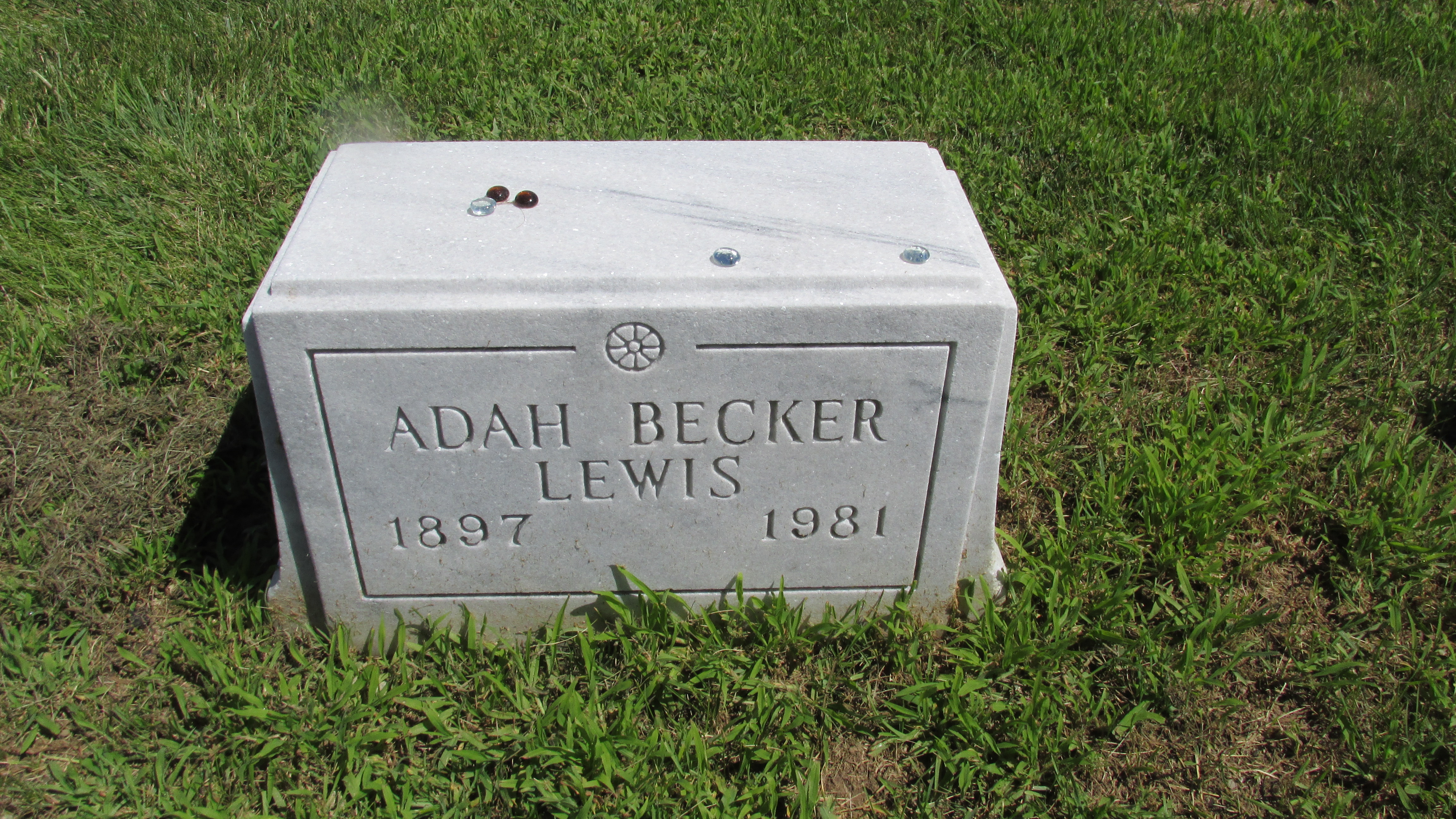
Adah Becker Lewis grave marker.

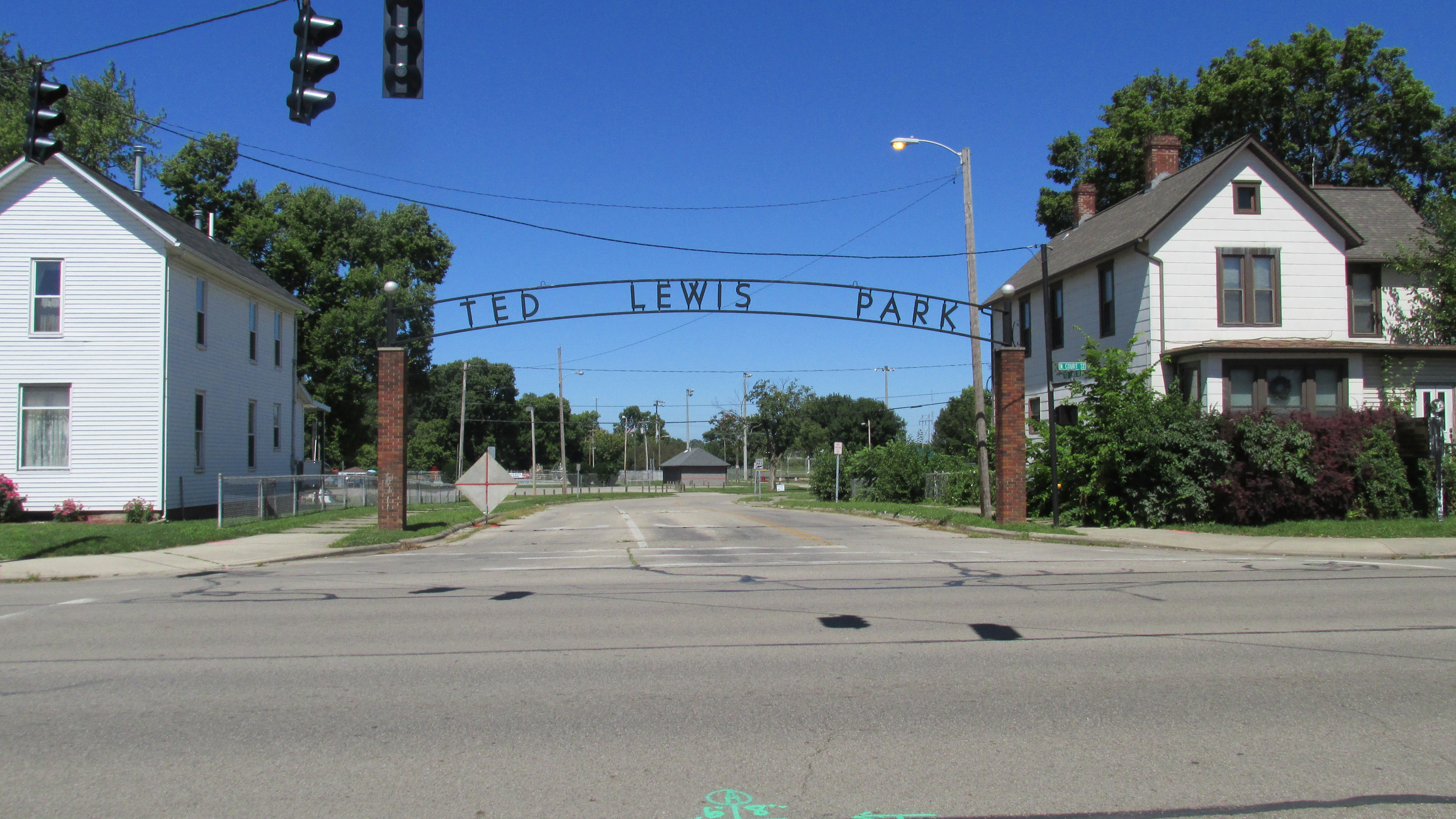
Ted Lewis Park in Circleville, Ohio.
