= Let's Put Out the Lights (and Go to Sleep) =

Song by Rudy Vallee
- Published: 1932
- Songwriter: Herman Hupfeld

"Let's Put Out the Lights (and Go to Sleep)" is a popular song by Herman Hupfeld, published in 1932. It was introduced by Lili Damita in the Broadway revue George White's Music Hall Varieties (1932) with the initial title "(Let's) Turn Out the Lights and Go to Bed", and hit versions that year were by Rudy Vallée, Paul Whiteman (vocal by Red McKenzie) and Ben Bernie.

== Recorded versions ==
- Ambrose and his orchestra (1933).
- Ben Bernie and his orchestra (recorded September 15, 1932, released as Brunswick catalog number 6385, with the flip side "You're Telling Me")
- The song is featured on the soundtrack of the Betty Boop cartoon She Wronged Him Right (1934).
- Rosemary Clooney and Bing Crosby (recorded for their radio show in 1960. Subsequently issued on the CD Bing & Rosie - The Crosby-Clooney Radio Sessions.)
- Ray Conniff and his orchestra (on his 1959 album It's the Talk of the Town)
- Bing Crosby (recorded October 28, 1932, released as Brunswick catalog number 6414, with the flip side "Brother, Can You Spare a Dime?"; remade for Columbia Records and released as catalog number 39521, with the flip side "Sweet Georgia Brown")
- Leo Hannon Broadway Bellhops, with vocal by Iver Bjorn (recorded October 1932, released as Crown catalog number 3387, with the flip side "Underneath the Harlem Moon")
- Lena Horne on RCA Victor LP, LPM/LSP-1879 Give The Lady What She Wants (1958).
- Dean Martin (recorded October 14, 1958, and released on his Capitol album Sleep Warm)
- Freddy Martin and his orchestra [released as RCA Victor catalog numbers 20-3614 (78 rpm) and 47-3119 (45 rpm), both with the flip side "Home Town Band" and 20-4517, with the flip side "Deep in a Dream"
- Billy May and his orchestra
- Mitch Miller - Rhythm / Sing Along With Mitch (1962)
- Charlie Palloy and his orchestra (Crown catalog number 3395, with the flip side "How Deep Is the Ocean?")
- Jane Russell (recorded July 1947, released as Columbia catalog number 37917, with the flip side "Do It Again")
- Paul Small and his orchestra (recorded September 27 or October 5, 1932, released as Banner catalog number 32577), as Conqueror catalog number 8018, as Perfect catalog number 15682, and as Romeo catalog number 1945, all with the flip side "This Is No Dream"
- Jack Smith (recorded October 1945, released as Majestic catalog number 7173, with the flip side "I'll Be Yours")
- Lew Stone and the Monseigneur Band, vocal Al Bowlly and Mary Charles, Decca Catalogue Number F-3270, recorded November 16, 1932
- Rudy Vallée's Connecticut Yankees (recorded September 9, 1932, released as Columbia catalog number 2715-D, with the flip side "Me Minus You") This version was used in the 1981 film Pennies from Heaven.
- Sarah Vaughan (recorded October 20, 1954, released on her Mercury album Sarah Vaughan at the Blue Note)
- Paul Whiteman and his orchestra (with vocal by Ramona Davies, recorded September 26, 1932, released as Victor catalog number 24140, with the flip side "You're Telling Me")
- French adaptation "Éteignons tout et couchons nous", written by Louis Hennevé, recorded by Ray Ventura and Jean Sablon.
- Mistinguett used the music for a sketch comedy under the name Sur le boulevard des Italiens in 1933
