= Herman Hupfeld =

American songwriter (1894–1951)

Herman Hupfeld (February 18, 1894 – June 8, 1951) was an American songwriter, whose most notable composition was the lyrics and music of "As Time Goes By".

== Life and career ==
Hupfeld was born in Montclair, New Jersey, the son of Fredericka (Rader), a church organist, and Charles Ludwig Hupfeld. He was sent to study the violin in Germany at the age of nine. Returning to the United States, he graduated from Montclair High School in 1915 and enlisted in the Navy during World War I. Following the war, he commenced a songwriting career. He entertained camps and hospitals during World War II.

Hupfeld never wrote a whole Broadway score, but became known as someone who could write a song to fit a specific scene within a show. Besides "As Time Goes By", his best-known songs include "Sing Something Simple", "Let's Put Out the Lights (and Go to Sleep)", "When Yuba Plays the Rumba on the Tuba", "I've Gotta Get Up and Go to Work", "Are You Making Any Money?", "Savage Serenade", "Down the Old Back Road", "A Hut in Hoboken", "Night Owl", "Honey Ma Love", "Baby's Blue", "Untitled" and "The Calinda". While not known as a public performer, he is featured on a 78 rpm gramophone record with Victor Young & his Orchestra, recorded on January 22, 1932, singing and playing piano on two of his compositions, "Goopy Geer (He Plays Piano and He Plays By Ear)" and "Down the Old Back Road". Hupfeld wrote the song "Goopy Geer", which became the basis for the Merrie Melodies cartoon of the same name Goopy Geer and consequently the titular character.

Hupfeld never married, and lived with his mother in Montclair until his death from a stroke in 1951 at the age of 57. He was buried at Mount Hebron Cemetery, Montclair, New Jersey. His mother died six years later, aged 90. While Hupfeld was alive, their house was often visited by people from the world of entertainment, including Bing Crosby and Mae West. Crosby recorded "As Time Goes By" in 1943.

== "As Time Goes By" ==
"As Time Goes By" is most famous from the film Casablanca (1942). It was originally written for the Broadway show Everybody's Welcome (1931), which ran for 139 performances. In 1931, the song was a modest hit, with versions issued on Victor, Columbia, Brunswick and the dime store labels.

The song was featured in the unproduced play Everybody Comes To Rick's, the basis for the Casablanca story and script. Against the wishes of Max Steiner, who wrote the music for the film, it was decided to feature the song in the 1942 film. It has been well documented that the producers considered dropping the song in post-production but, since Ingrid Bergman had been given the part of Maria in Paramount's For Whom the Bell Tolls and had cut her hair for the part, it would not have been possible to reshoot her scenes in which the song was performed or to meet her request that Sam (Dooley Wilson) play a different song.
