= Joe Young (lyricist) =

American lyricist (1889–1939)

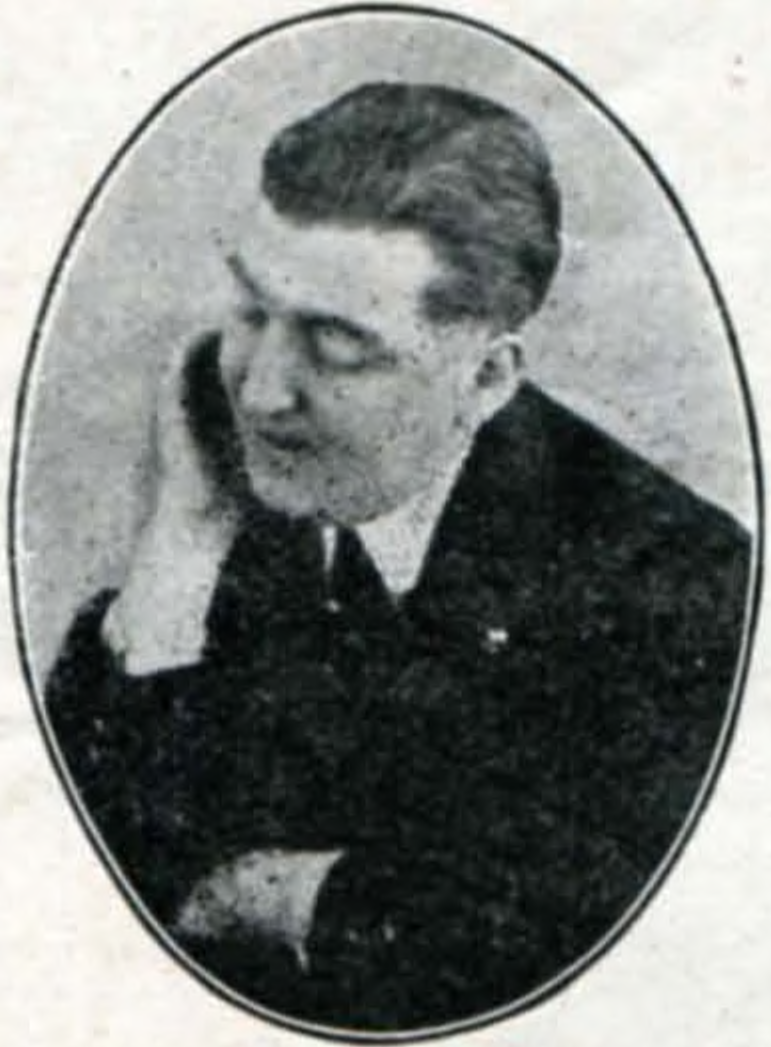
- Young in 1919

Background information
- Born: Joseph Judewitz; July 4, 1889; New York City, U.S.
- Died: April 21, 1939 (aged 49) New York City, U.S.
- Genres: Traditional pop
- Occupation: Lyricist
- Years active: 1911–1930s

Joe Young (July 4, 1889 – April 21, 1939) was an American lyricist, born in New York City as Joseph Judewitz to immigrant Jewish parents. In 1911, he began his career as a singer and song plugger for various music publishers. During World War I, he entertained U.S. troops and sang across Europe.

== Early work ==
An early work is the song "Way Down East" (1910), with words by Cecil Mack, music by Young and Harold Norman, published by the Gotham-Attucks Music Publishing Company.

== The Laugh Parade ==
For the 1931 Broadway show The Laugh Parade, Young collaborated with co-lyricist Mort Dixon and composer Harry Warren on "You're My Everything". The show also included:

- "Ooh! That Kiss"
- "Love Me Forever"
- "That Torch Song"

== Later work ==
- "In a Shanty in Old Shanty Town"
- "Lullaby of the Leaves"
- "Snuggled on Your Shoulder (Cuddled in Your Arms)"
- "Was That the Human Thing to Do?"
- "Something in the Night"
- "Annie Doesn't Live Here Anymore"
- "I'm Growing Fonder of You"
- "You're a Heavenly Thing"
- "Sing an Old Fashioned Song"
- "Dancing with You"
- "Just a Baby's Prayer at Twilight (For Her Daddy Over There)"
- "Whistle and Blow Your Blues Away"

Young's last work was the pop standard "I'm Gonna Sit Right Down and Write Myself a Letter", written with Fred Ahlert in 1935.

He died in New York in 1939 and was inducted into the Songwriters Hall of Fame in 1970.
