= 1937 in music =

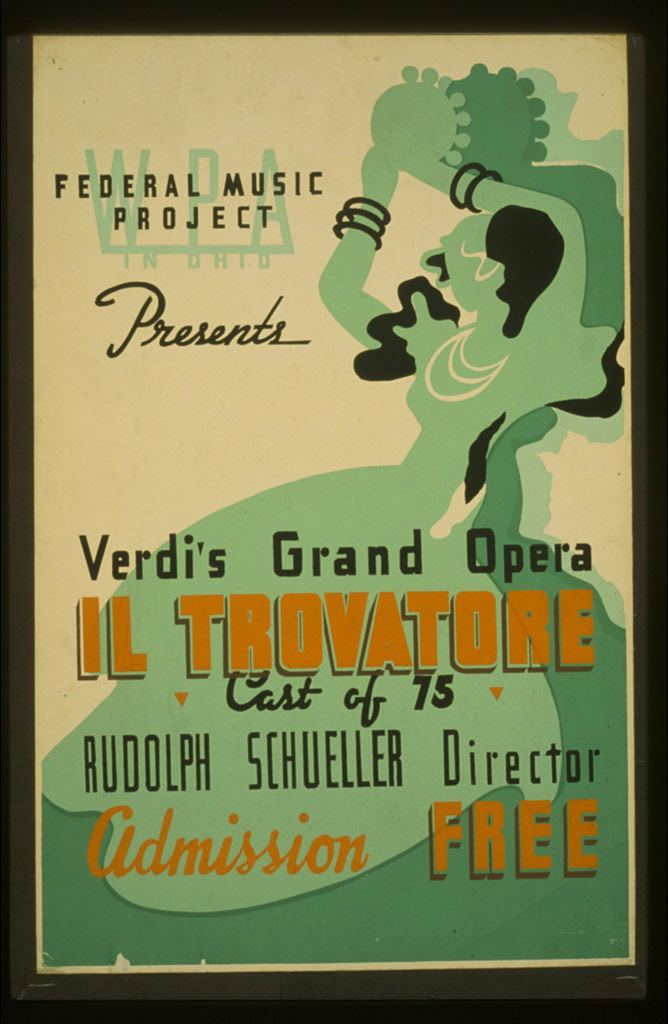
1937 Works Progress Administration production of Il trovatore

This is a list of notable events in music that took place in the year 1937.

== Specific locations ==
- 1937 in British music
- 1937 in Norwegian music

== Specific genres ==
- 1937 in country music
- 1937 in jazz

== Events ==
- January 24 – Ernest John Moeran completes the revised version of his Symphony in G minor, dedicated to conductor Hamilton Harty.
- March 6 – Benjamin Britten and Peter Pears first meet, in London.
- May 12 – At the coronation of King George VI and Queen Elizabeth in Westminster Abbey, William Walton's ceremonial march, "Crown Imperial", originally written for his predecessor, King Edward VIII, is performed for the first time.
- June 2 – The incomplete version of Alban Berg's opera Lulu is premièred in Zürich (it is later completed in a version premiered in 1979)
- June 8 –
  - After a New York recital with pianist José Iturbi, violinist Manuel Quiroga is hit by a truck while crossing Times Square, leaving him with a paralysed arm.
  - Première of Carl Orff's Carmina Burana in Frankfurt, Germany.
- November 30 – Ruth Etting divorces Martin Snyder.
- December 9 - At the age of 22, the accordionist John Serry Sr. makes the first of several recordings with the Shep Fields Jazz Orchestra.
- December 25 – At the age of 70, Italian-born conductor Arturo Toscanini conducts the NBC Symphony Orchestra on U.S. radio for the first time, beginning his 17-year tenure with the orchestra. This first concert consists of music by Vivaldi (at a time when he is seldom played), Mozart, and Brahms. Millions tune in to listen, including U.S. President Franklin Delano Roosevelt.
- Perry Como begins singing with the Ted Weems orchestra. Frankie Laine fills Como's vacated position with the Freddie Carlone band.
- Renato Carosone obtains his pianoforte diploma.

== Top popular recordings ==
The twenty popular records in the United States listed below were extracted from Joel Whitburn's Pop Memories 1890–1954, record sales reported on the "Discography of American Historical Recordings" website, and other sources as specified. Numerical rankings are approximate, they are only used as a frame of reference.

| Rank | Artist | Title | Label | Recorded | Released | Chart positions |
|---|---|---|---|---|---|---|
| 1 | Bing Crosby | "Sweet Leilani" | Decca | February 22, 1937 | March 1937 | US BB 1937 #1, US #1 for 10 weeks, 25 total weeks, 1,000,000 sales |
| 2 | Tommy Dorsey and His Orchestra | "Once In A While" | Victor | July 21, 1937 | October 13, 1937 | US BB 1937 #2, US #1 for 7 weeks, 14 total weeks, Jazz Standards 1937 |
| 3 | Tommy Dorsey and His Orchestra | "The Dipsy Doodle" | Victor | October 14, 1937 | November 1, 1937 | US BB 1937 #3, US #1 for 6 weeks, 15 total weeks |
| 4 | Guy Lombardo and His Royal Canadians | "It Looks Like Rain in Cherry Blossom Lane" | Victor | April 21, 1937 | May 5, 1937 | US BB 1937 #4, US #1 for 5 weeks, 16 total weeks |
| 5 | Guy Lombardo and His Royal Canadians | "Boo Hoo" | Victor | February 17, 1937 | March 1937 | US BB 1937 #5, US #1 for 5 weeks, 12 total weeks |
| 6 | Guy Lombardo and His Royal Canadians | "September in the Rain" | Victor | February 2, 1937 | March 1937 | US BB 1937 #6, US #1 for 4 weeks, 16 total weeks |
| 7 | Shep Fields and His Rippling Rhythm Orchestra | "That Old Feeling" | Bluebird | July 2, 1937 | July 21, 1937 | US BB 1937 #7, US #1 for 4 weeks, 14 total weeks |
| 8 | Bob Crosby and His Orchestra | "Whispers in the Dark" | Decca | July 7, 1937 | August 1937 | US BB 1937 #8, US #1 for 4 weeks, 13 total weeks |
| 9 | Benny Goodman and His Orchestra (Vocal Ella Fitzgerald) | Goodnight, My Love | Victor | November 5, 1936 | November 18, 1936 | US BB 1936 #9, US #1 for 4 weeks, 13 total weeks |
| 10 | Bing Crosby | "The Moon Got in My Eyes" | Decca | July 12, 1937 | August 1937 | US BB 1937 #10, US #1 for 4 weeks, 11 total weeks |
| 11 | Hal Kemp and His Orchestra | "This Year's Kisses" | Brunswick | January 4, 1937 | February 1937 | US BB 1936 #11, US #1 for 4 weeks, 8 total weeks |
| 12 | Guy Lombardo and His Royal Canadians | "A Sailboat in the Moonlight" | Victor | May 28, 1937 | June 1937 | US BB 1937 #12, US #1 for 3 weeks, 14 total weeks |
| 13 | Teddy Wilson and His Orchestra (vocal Billie Holiday) | "Carelessly" | Brunswick | March 31, 1937 | April 1937 | US BB 1937 #13, US #1 for 3 weeks, 12 total weeks |
| 14 | Tommy Dorsey and His Orchestra | "Satan Takes a Holiday" | Victor | April 15, 1937 | July 1937 | US BB 1937 #14, US #1 for 3 weeks, 11 total weeks |
| 15 | Benny Goodman and His Orchestra (Vocal Margaret McCrae) | "This Year's Kisses" | Victor | December 30, 1936 | January 20, 1937 | US BB 1937 #15, US #1 for 3 weeks, 10 total weeks |
| 16 | Bing Crosby | Remember Me? | Decca | September 20, 1937 | October 1937 | US BB 1937 #16, US #1 for 3 weeks, 6 total weeks |
| 17 | Eddy Duchin and His Orchestra | "It's De-Lovely" | Victor | October 2, 1937 | October 21, 1937 | US BB 1936 #17, US #1 for 2 weeks, 13 total weeks |
| 18 | Russ Morgan and His Orchestra | "The Merry-Go-Round Broke Down" | Brunswick | April 29, 1937 | May 1937 | US BB 1937 #18, US #1 for 2 weeks, 10 total weeks |
| 19 | Tommy Dorsey and His Orchestra | "Marie" | Victor | January 29, 1937 | February 17, 1937 | US BB 1937 #19, US #1 for 2 weeks, 8 total weeks, Grammy Hall of Fame 1998, 150,000 sales |
| 20 | Shep Fields and His Rippling Rhythm Orchestra | "The Merry-Go-Round Broke Down" | Bluebird | June 3, 1937 | June 16, 1937 | US BB 1937 #20, US #1 for 2 weeks, 8 total weeks |
| 21 | Fats Waller and his Rhythm | "(You Know it All) Smarty" | Victor | June 11, 1937 | June 30, 1937 | US BB 1937 #21, US #1 for 2 weeks, 8 total weeks |
| 22 | Tommy Dorsey and His Orchestra | "The Big Apple" | Victor | August 13, 1937 | August 25, 1937 | US BB 1937 #22, US #1 for 2 weeks, 7 total weeks |
| 23 | Teddy Wilson and His Orchestra (vocal Billie Holiday) | "You Can't Stop Me from Dreaming" | Brunswick | August 29, 1937 | September 1937 | US BB 1937 #23, US #1 for 2 weeks, 7 total weeks |
| 24 | Hal Kemp and His Orchestra | "Where or When" | Brunswick | March 24, 1937 | April 1937 | US BB 1936 #24, US #1 for 1 weeks, 16 total weeks |
| 27 | Fred Astaire | "They Can't Take That Away From Me" | Brunswick | March 14, 1937 | April 1937 | US BB 1937 #27, US #1 for 1 weeks, 11 total weeks, Grammy Hall of Fame 2005, Jazz Standards 1937 |
| 28 | Bing Crosby | Too Marvelous for Words | Decca | March 3, 1937 | April 1937 | US BB 1937 #28, US #1 for 1 weeks, 10 total weeks |
| 29 | Duke Ellington and His Famous Orchestra | Caravan | Master | May 14, 1937 | June 1937 | US BB 1937 #60, US #4 for 1 weeks, 18 total weeks, Grammy Hall of Fame 2009, Jazz Standards 1936 |

== Number one hit songs (in order) ==
- "It's De-Lovely" – Eddy Duchin
- "Goodnight My Love" – Benny Goodman and Ella Fitzgerald
- "This Year's Kisses" – Benny Goodman, Helen Forrest
- "Marie" – Tommy Dorsey, Jack Leonard, Bunny Berigan
- "Boo Hoo" – Guy Lombardo
- "Sweet Leilani" – Bing Crosby
- "Too Marvelous For Words" – Bing Crosby
- "They Can't Take That Away From Me" – Fred Astaire
- "Carelessly" – Teddy Wilson with vocal by Billie Holiday
- "September In the Rain" – Guy Lombardo
- "It Looks Like Rain in Cherry Blossom Lane" – Guy Lombardo
- "The Merry-Go-Round Broke Down" – Shep Fields
- "Where Or When" – Hal Kemp
- "Smarty" – Fats Waller
- "A Sailboat in the Moonlight" – Guy Lombardo
- "Satan Takes A Holiday" – Billy May, Tommy Dorsey
- "Whispers In the Dark" – Bob Crosby
- "The Big Apple" – Tommy Dorsey
- "So Rare" – Guy Lombardo
- "The Moon Got In My Eyes" – Bing Crosby
- "That Old Feeling" – Shep Fields
- "You Can't Stop Me From Dreaming" – Teddy Wilson
- "Remember Me?" – Bing Crosby
- "Once In Awhile" – Tommy Dorsey
- "The Dipsy Doodle" – Tommy Dorsey
- "Bob White (Whatcha Gonna Swing Tonight)" – Bing Crosby
- "Nice Work If You Can Get It" – Fred Astaire
- "Rosalie" – Sammy Kaye
- "Vieni, Vieni" – Rudy Vallee

== Published popular music ==
- "Afraid To Dream" words: Mack Gordon, music: Harry Revel
- "After You" w.m. Sam Coslow & Al Siegel
- "All God's Chillun Got Rhythm" w. Gus Kahn m. Bronislaw Kaper & Walter Jurmann
- "All You Want To Do Is Dance" w. Johnny Burke m. Arthur Johnston. Introduced by Bing Crosby in the film Double or Nothing.
- "Always And Always" w. Bob Wright & Chet Forrest m. Edward Ward
- "Am I In Love?" w. Al Dubin m. Harry Warren. Introduced by Kenny Baker in the film Mr. Dodd Takes the Air.
- "Azure" w. Irving Mills m. Duke Ellington
- "(I've Got) Beginner's Luck" w. Ira Gershwin m. George Gershwin. Introduced by Fred Astaire in the film Shall We Dance
- "Blossoms On Broadway" w. Leo Robin m. Ralph Rainger
- "Blue Hawaii" w. Leo Robin m. Ralph Rainger. Introduced by Bing Crosby and Shirley Ross in the film Waikiki Wedding
- "Bob White (Whatcha Gonna Swing Tonight)" w. Johnny Mercer m. Bernard Hanighen
- "Boo-Hoo" w. Edward Heyman m. John Jacob Loeb & Carmen Lombardo
- "Broken Hearted Clown" w.m. Don Pelosi, Harry Leon
- "By Myself" w. Howard Dietz m. Arthur Schwartz
- "Camel Hop" m. Mary Lou Williams
- "Can I Forget You?" w. Oscar Hammerstein II m. Jerome Kern
- "Caravan" w. Irving Mills m. Juan Tizol & Duke Ellington
- "Carelessly" w. Charles Kenny & Nick Kenny m. Norman Ellis
- "Cause My Baby Says It's So" w. Al Dubin m. Harry Warren
- "Community Swing" m. Glenn Miller
- "Dear Mr Gable (You Made Me Love You)" w. Joseph McCarthy m. James V. Monaco with extra lyrics Roger Edens
- "Did Anyone Ever Tell You?" w. Harold Adamson m. Jimmy McHugh. Introduced by Virginia Bruce in the film When Love Is Young
- "Did Your Mother Come From Ireland?" w.m. Jimmy Kennedy & Michael Carr
- "Dinner Music For A Pack Of Hungry Cannibals" m. Raymond Scott
- "The Dipsy Doodle" w.m. Larry Clinton
- "The Donkey Serenade" w. Robert Wright, George Forrest m. Rudolf Friml & Herbert Stothart
- "Down With Love" E. Y. "Yip" Harburg, Harold Arlen. Introduced by Vivian Vance, Jack Whiting and June Clyde in the musical Hooray for What!
- "Dusk In Upper Sandusky" m. Larry Clinton & Jimmy Dorsey
- "Easy Living" w. Leo Robin m. Ralph Rainger
- "Everybody Sing" w. Arthur Freed m. Nacio Herb Brown
- "A Foggy Day" w. Ira Gershwin m. George Gershwin. Introduced by Fred Astaire in the film A Damsel in Distress
- "The Folks Who Live on the Hill" w. Oscar Hammerstein II m. Jerome Kern
- "Foolin' Myself" w. Jack Lawrence m. Peter Tinturin
- "For Dancers Only" w. Don Raye & Vic Schoen m. Sy Oliver
- "The Girl On The Police Gazette" w.m. Irving Berlin
- "God's Country" w. E. Y. Harburg m. Harold Arlen
- "Gone with the Wind" w. Herb Magidson m. Allie Wrubel
- "Goodnight Angel" w. Herb Magidson m. Allie Wrubel. Introduced by Jack Oakie and Ann Miller in the revue Radio City Revels and performed in the film version by Kenny Baker.
- "Got a Pair of New Shoes" w. Arthur Freed m. Nacio Herb Brown. Introduced by Judy Garland in the film Thoroughbreds Don't Cry.
- "Harbour Lights" w. Jimmy Kennedy m. Hugh Williams
- "Have You Got Any Castles, Baby?" w. Johnny Mercer m. Richard A. Whiting. Introduced by Priscilla Lane in the film Varsity Show.
- "Have You Met Miss Jones?" w. Lorenz Hart m. Richard Rodgers
- "He's a Gypsy From Poughkeepsie" w.m. Bud Green & Emery Deutsch
- "Heigh-Ho" w. Larry Morey m. Frank Churchill. Sung by Roy Atwell, Pinto Colvig, Otis Harlan, Scotty Mattraw, and Billy Gilbert in the animated film Snow White and the Seven Dwarfs.
- "High, Wide, and Handsome" w. Oscar Hammerstein II m. Jerome Kern
- "Home Town" w.m. Jimmy Kennedy & Michael Carr
- "I Can't Be Bothered Now" w. Ira Gershwin m. George Gershwin. Introduced by Fred Astaire in the film A Damsel in Distress
- "I Double Dare You" w. Jimmy Eaton m. Terry Shand
- "I Know Now" w. Al Dubin m. Harry Warren
- "I See Your Face Before Me" w. Howard Dietz m. Arthur Schwartz
- "I Used to Be Color Blind" w.m. Irving Berlin introduced by Fred Astaire in the 1938 film Carefree
- "I Was Doing All Right" w. Ira Gershwin m. George Gershwin
- "I Wish I Were in Love Again" w. Lorenz Hart m. Richard Rodgers
- "I'd Rather Be Right" w. Lorenz Hart M. Richard Rodgers
- "If It's The Last Thing I Do" w.m. Sammy Cahn & Saul Chaplin
- "I'll Take Romance" w. Oscar Hammerstein II m. Ben Oakland
- "I'm Like A Fish Out Of Water" w. Johnny Mercer m. Richard A. Whiting
- "I'm Wishing" w. Larry Morey m. Frank Churchill. Sung by Adriana Caselotti in the animated film Snow White And The Seven Dwarfs
- "In the Still of the Night" w.m. Cole Porter
- "It Looks Like Rain In Cherry Blossom Lane" w. Edgar Leslie m. Joe Burke
- "It's Raining Sunbeams" w. Sam Coslow m. Frederick Hollander
- "It's The Natural Thing To Do" w. Johnny Burke m. Arthur Johnston. Introduced by Bing Crosby in the film Double or Nothing.
- "It's Wonderful" w. Mitchell Parish m. Stuff Smith
- "I've Got My Love to Keep Me Warm" w.m. Irving Berlin sung by Dick Powell & Alice Faye (in the film "On the Avenue")
- "I've Hitched My Wagon To A Star" w. Johnny Mercer m. Richard A. Whiting
- "Johnny One Note" w. Lorenz Hart m. Richard Rodgers
- "The Joint Is Jumpin"' w. Andy Razaf m. Fats Waller & James C. Johnson
- "The Lady Is a Tramp" w. Lorenz Hart m. Richard Rodgers
- "The Lambeth Walk" w. Douglas Furber, L. Arthur Rose m. Noel Gay
- "Leaning on a Lamp-post" w.m. Noel Gay
- "Let's Call The Whole Thing Off" w. Ira Gershwin m. George Gershwin. Introduced by Fred Astaire and Ginger Rogers in the film Shall We Dance
- "Let's Dance At The Make Believe Ballroom" Andy Razaf, Paul Denniker
- "Lisbon Antigua (In Old Lisbon)" w. Harry Dupree m. Raul Portela, J. Galhardo & A. Do Vale
- "Love Is Good For Anything That Ails You" Cliff Friend, Matt Malneck
- "Love Is Here to Stay" w. Ira Gershwin m. George Gershwin
- "Me And My Girl" w.m. Noel Gay & Douglas Furber
- "The Meanest Thing You Ever Did Was Kiss Me" w.m. Al Lewis, Murray Mencher & Charles Newman
- "The Merry-Go-Round Broke Down" w.m. Cliff Friend & Dave Franklin
- "Moanin' In The Mornin' " w. E. Y. Harburg m. Harold Arlen
- "The Mood That I'm In" w.m. Abner Silver & Al Sherman
- "The Moon Got In My Eyes" w. Johnny Burke m. Arthur Johnston. Introduced by Bing Crosby in the film Double or Nothing.
- "The Moon of Manakoora" w. Frank Loesser m. Alfred Newman. Introduced by Dorothy Lamour in the film The Hurricane
- "Moonlight On The Campus" w. Johnny Mercer m. Richard A. Whiting
- "The Morning After" w.m. Tommy Dorsey, Moe Jaffe & Clay Boland
- "My Fine Feathered Friend" w. Harold Adamson m. Jimmy McHugh
- "My Funny Valentine" w. Lorenz Hart m. Richard Rodgers
- "Never in a Million Years" w. Mack Gordon m. Harry Revel
- "Nice Work If You Can Get It" w. Ira Gershwin m. George Gershwin. Introduced by Fred Astaire in the film A Damsel in Distress
- "On a Little Bamboo Bridge" w. Archie Fletcher m. Al Sherman
- "On The Sentimental Side" w. Johnny Burke m. James V. Monaco
- "Once In A While" w. Bud Green m. Michael Edwards
- "One O'Clock Jump" m. Count Basie
- "One Song" w. Larry Morey m. Frank Churchill. Sung by Harry Stockwell in the animated film Snow White and the Seven Dwarfs
- "Peter And The Wolf" m. Sergei Prokofiev
- "A Reckless Night On Board An Ocean Liner" m. Raymond Scott
- "Remember Me?" w. Al Dubin m. Harry Warren
- "Rosalie" w.m. Cole Porter
- "Sail Along, Silv'ry Moon" w. Harry Tobias m. Percy Wenrich
- "A Sailboat In The Moonlight" w.m. John Jacob Loeb & Carmen Lombardo
- "Satan Takes A Holiday" m. Larry Clinton
- "Sentimental and Melancholy" w. Johnny Mercer m. Richard Whiting
- "September In The Rain" w. Al Dubin m. Harry Warren. Introduced by James Melton in the film Melody for Two.
- "Shall We Dance?" w. Ira Gershwin m. George Gershwin. Introduced by Fred Astaire in the film Shall We Dance
- "Sing Me A Song With Social Significance" w.m. Harold Rome
- "Slap That Bass" w. Ira Gershwin m. George Gershwin. Introduced by Fred Astaire and Dudley Dickerson in the film Shall We Dance
- "Slumming on Park Avenue" w.m. Irving Berlin
- "So Rare" w. Jack Sharpe m. Jerry Herst
- "Some Day My Prince Will Come" w. Larry Morey m. Frank Churchill. Sung by Adriana Caselotti in the animated film Snow White And The Seven Dwarfs
- "Somebody Else Is Taking My Place" w.m. Dick Howard, Russ Morgan & Bob Ellsworth
- "South Rampart Street Parade" m. Ray Bauduc & Bob Haggart
- "Stiff Upper Lip" Ira Gershwin m. George Gershwin. Introduced by Gracie Allen in the film A Damsel in Distress
- "Stop! You're Breaking My Heart" w. Ted Koehler m. Burton Lane
- "Sweet Leilani" w.m. Harry Owens. Introduced by Bing Crosby in the film Waikiki Wedding
- "Sweet Someone" w. Mack Gordon m. Harry Revel. Introduced by Simone Simon in the film Love and Hisses
- "Swing High, Swing Low" w. Ralph Freed m. Burton Lane
- "Ten Pretty Girls" w.m. Will Grosz & Jimmy Kennedy
- "That Old Feeling" w. Lew Brown m. Sammy Fain
- "That's What I Like 'Bout The South" w.m. Andy Razaf
- "Then It Isn't Love" w. Leo Robin m. Ralph Rainger
- "There's a Gold Mine in the Sky" w.m. Charles Kenny & Nick Kenny
- "There's A Lull In My Life" w. Mack Gordon m. Harry Revel
- "They All Laughed" w. Ira Gershwin m. George Gershwin. Introduced by Ginger Rogers in the film Shall We Dance
- "They Can't Take That Away From Me" w. Ira Gershwin m. George Gershwin. Introduced by Fred Astaire in the film Shall We Dance
- "Things Are Looking Up" w. Ira Gershwin m. George Gershwin. Introduced by Fred Astaire in the film A Damsel in Distress
- "This Year's Kisses" w.m. Irving Berlin
- "Thrill of a Lifetime" w. Sam Coslow & Carmen Lombardo m. Frederick Hollander. Introduced by Dorothy Lamour in the film Thrill of a Lifetime
- "Tomorrow Is Another Day" w. Gus Kahn m. Bronislaw Kaper & Walter Jurmann from the film A Day at the Races
- "Too Marvelous for Words" w. Johnny Mercer m. Richard A. Whiting
- "The Toy Trumpet" w. Sidney D. Mitchell & Lew Pollack m. Raymond Scott
- "Triplets" w. Howard Dietz m. Arthur Schwartz
- "Trusting My Luck" Maurice Sigler, Arthur Johnston
- "Turn Off The Moon" w.m. Sam Coslow. Introduced by Kenny Baker in the film of the same name.
- "Twilight In Turkey" m. Raymond Scott
- "Vieni, Vieni" w. (It & Fr) George Koger & Henri Varna (Eng) Rudy Vallee m. Vincent Scotto
- "Wake Up And Live" w. Mack Gordon m. Harry Revel
- "Walter, Walter" w.m. W. E. Haines, J. Harper & Eugene Butler
- "Was It Rain?" w. Walter Hirsch m. Lou Handman. Introduced by Frances Langford in the film The Hit Parade
- "When Love Is Young" w. Harold Adamson m. Jimmy McHugh. Introduced by Virginia Bruce in the film When Love Is Young
- "Where Or When" w. Lorenz Hart m. Richard Rodgers. Introduced by Ray Heatherton and Mitzi Green in the musical Babes In Arms
- "Whispers In The Dark" w. Leo Robin m. Frederick Hollander. Introduced by Connie Boswell in the film Artists and Models
- "Whistle While You Work" w. Larry Morey m. Frank Churchill. Sung by Adriana Caselotti in the animated film Snow White And The Seven Dwarfs
- "With A Smile And A Song" w. Larry Morey m. Frank Churchill. Sung by Adriana Caselotti in the animated film Snow White And The Seven Dwarfs
- "You Can't Stop Me From Dreaming" w.m. Dave Franklin & Cliff Friend
- "You're Laughing At Me" w.m. Irving Berlin. Introduced by Dick Powell in the film On the Avenue.

== Top blues records ==
- "Cross Road Blues" – Robert Johnson
- "Don't Tear My Clothes" – Big Bill Broonzy
- "Horny Frog" – Big Bill Broonzy
- "Terraplane Blues" – Robert Johnson
- "32-20 Blues" – Robert Johnson
- "Come On In My Kitchen" – Robert Johnson
- "Good Morning School Girl" – Sonny Boy Williamson

== Classical music ==
=== Premieres ===
| Composer | Composition | Date | Location | Performers |
|---|---|---|---|---|
| Bartók, Béla | Music for Strings, Percussion and Celesta | 1937-01-21 | Basel, Switzerland | Basel Chamber Orchestra – Sacher |
| Benjamin, Arthur | Overture to an Italian Comedy | 1937-03-02 | London | [unknown ensemble] – Jacob |
| Bloch, Ernest | Voice in the Wilderness | 1937-01-21 | Los Angeles | Borisoff / Los Angeles Philharmonic – Klemperer |
| Britten, Benjamin | On this Island | 1937-11-19 | London | Wyss, Britten |
| Britten, Benjamin | Reveille | 1937-04-12 | London | Brosa, Reizenstein |
| Britten, Benjamin | Variations on a Theme by Frank Bridge | 1937-08-27 | Salzburg, Austria (Festival) | Boyd Neel Orchestra – Neel |
| Copland, Aaron | El Salón México | 1937-08-27 | Mexico City | Mexico Symphony – Chávez |
| Copland, Aaron | Prairie Journal | 1937-07-25 | New York City | Columbia Symphony – Barlow |
| Dallapiccola, Luigi | Tre laudi | 1937-09-08 | Venice (Festival) | Vivante / Grupo Strumentale Italiano – Sanzogno |
| Farkas, Ferenc | Harp Concertino | 1937-03-11 | Budapest | Molnár / [unknown ensemble] – Kenessey |
| Ginastera, Alberto | Danzas Argentinas | 1937-10-27 | Buenos Aires | De Raco |
| Ginastera, Alberto | Suite from Panambí | 1937-11-27 | Buenos Aires | [unknown ensemble] – Castro |
| Ives, Charles | Psalm 67 (1899) | 1937-05-06 | New York City | The Madrigal Singers – Engel |
| Jolivet, André | Romantiques | 1937-03-20 | Paris | Gérar, D'Aleman |
| Jolivet, André | Trois Chants des Hommes | 1937-06-04 | Paris | Bastard / Paris Conservatory Concerts Society Orchestra – Modesti |
| Khachaturian, Aram | Piano Concerto | 1937-07-12 | Moscow | Oborin / Moscow Philharmonic – Steinberg |
| Messiaen, Olivier | Fêtes des belles eaux | 1937-07-25 | Paris (Expo 37) | [unknown ensemble] |
| Messiaen, Olivier | Poèmes pour Mi | 1937-06-04 | Paris | Bunlet / Paris Conservatory Concerts Society Orchestra – Désormière |
| Milhaud, Darius | Suite provençale | 1937-09-12 | Venice (Festival) | [unknown ensemble] – Milhaud |
| Myaskovsky, Nikolay | Symphony No. 17 | 1937-12-17 | Moscow | USSR State Symphony – Gauk |
| Myaskovsky, Nikolay | Symphony No. 18 | 1937-10-01 | Moscow | USSR State Symphony – Gauk |
| Prokofiev, Sergei | Suite No. 2 from Romeo and Juliet | 1937-04-15 | Leningrad | Leningrad Philharmonic – Mravinsky |
| Roussel, Albert | Cello Concertino | 1937-02-06 | Paris | Fournier / Concerts Poulet Orchestra – Siohan |
| Rubbra, Edmund | Symphony No. 1 | 1937-04-30 | London | BBC Symphony – Boult |
| Schoenberg, Arnold | String Quartet No. 4 | 1937-01-08 | Los Angeles | Kolisch Quartet |
| Sessions, Roger | String Quartet No. 1 | 1937-04-10 | Washington D.C. | Coolidge Quartet |
| Shostakovich, Dmitri | Symphony No. 5 | 1937-11-21 | Leningrad | Leningrad Philharmonic – Mravinsky |
| Webern, Anton | Variations for Piano | 1937-10-26 | Vienna | Stadlen |

=== Compositions ===
- Jehan Alain
  - Variations sur un thème de Clément Janequin, for organ
  - Trois danses: Joies, Deuils, Luttes, for orchestra
- Luciano Berio – Pastorale for piano
- Arthur Bliss – Checkmate (ballet)
- Rutland Boughton – Symphony No. 3 in B minor
- Benjamin Britten – Variations on a Theme of Frank Bridge
- John Alden Carpenter – Piano Quintet
- David Diamond – Psalm
- George Dyson – Symphony in G major
- Hanns Eisler – String Quartet
- Ferenc Farkas – Concertino for Harp and Orchestra
- John Fernström – Viola Concerto
- Alan Hovhaness – Cello Concerto
- John Ireland – These Things Shall Be
- Frank Martin – Symphony
- Nikolai Medtner – sonate-idylle for piano, opus 56 in G major
- Nikolai Myaskovsky – revision of String Quartet No. 4, composition of Symphony No. 17 in G♯ minor and Symphony No. 18 in C major
- Dmitri Shostakovich – Symphony No. 5 in D minor, Op. 47
- Ralph Vaughan Williams – Job: A Masque for Dancing (ballet)
- Heitor Villa-Lobos
  - Ciclo brasileiro for piano
  - Distribuição de Flores for flute and guitar
- Percy Whitlock – Wessex Suite
- Havergal Brian – Symphony No. 5 "The Wine of Summer"

== Opera ==
- Alban Berg – Lulu (composed 1929–35; incomplete opera premiered 1937)
- Walter Damrosch – The Man Without a Country
- Arthur Honegger and Jacques Ibert – L'Aiglon
- Kurt Weill – The Eternal Road (Der Weg der Verheißung)

== Film ==
- Benjamin Britten – Love from a Stranger (1937 film)
- Frank Churchill, Leigh Harline – Snow White and the Seven Dwarfs (1937 film)
- George Gershwin – A Damsel in Distress (1937 film)
- George Gershwin – Shall We Dance (1937 film)
- Erich Korngold – Another Dawn (1937 film)
- Erich Korngold – The Prince and the Pauper (1937 film)
- Miklós Rózsa – Knight Without Armour
- Dimitri Tiomkin, Max Steiner – Lost Horizon (1937 film)

== Musical theatre ==
- Babes in Arms (Richard Rodgers and Lorenz Hart) Broadway production opened at the Shubert Theatre on April 14 and ran for 289 performances
- Between the Devil Broadway production opened at the Imperial Theatre on December 23 and ran for 93 performances
- The Cradle Will Rock (Marc Blitzstein) Broadway production directed by Orson Welles
- Hooray for What! (lyrics E. Y. Harburg, music Harold Arlen, book Howard Lindsay and Russel Crouse) Broadway production opened at the Winter Garden Theatre on December 1 and ran for 200 performances
- I'd Rather Be Right (Rodgers & Hart) Broadway production opened on November 2 at the Alvin Theatre and ran for 290 performances
- Me and My Girl (Noel Gay) – London production opened on December 16 at the Victoria Palace Theatre and ran for 1646 performances.
- On Your Toes London production opened at the Palace Theatre on February 5 and ran for 123 performances
- Pins and Needles Broadway revue opened at the Labor Stage Theatre on November 27 and ran for 1108 performances
- Swing is in the Air London revue opened at the Palladium on March 29
- Virginia opened at the Center Theatre on September 2 and ran for 60 performances

== Musical films ==
Portrait of Jessie Matthews by Thomas Cantrell Dugdale, 1937

- 52nd Street, starring Leo Carrillo, Ian Hunter, Pat Paterson, Ella Logan, Sid Silvers, Zasu Pitts and Kenny Baker. Directed by Harold Young.
- Ali Baba Goes to Town, starring Eddie Cantor, Tony Martin, Roland Young and June Lang and featuring Raymond Scott & his Quintet. Directed by David Butler.
- Broadway Melody of 1938, starring Robert Taylor, Eleanor Powell, George Murphy, Binnie Barnes, Buddy Ebsen, Sophie Tucker and Judy Garland.
- Calling All Stars, starring Bert Ambrose, Carroll Gibbons, Evelyn Dall, Sam Browne, Larry Adler, Elisabeth Welch and The Nicholas Brothers.
- Champagne Waltz starring Gladys Swarthout, Fred MacMurray, Jack Oakie and Veloz and Yolanda.
- Chintamani, starring M. K. Thyagaraja Bhagavathar
- Command Performance (1937 film), starring Arthur Tracy and Lilli Palmer
- A Damsel in Distress, starring Fred Astaire, Joan Fontaine, George Burns, Gracie Allen and Ray Noble.
- A Day at the Races, released June 11, starring the Marx Brothers and Allan Jones, and featuring Ivie Anderson
- Double or Nothing, released September 1, starring Bing Crosby and Martha Raye, and featuring Harry Barris and Frances Faye.
- Duniya Na Mane, starring Shanta Apte
- Every Day's a Holiday, starring Mae West, Edmund Lowe and Louis Armstrong. Directed by A. Edward Sutherland.
- Fight for Your Lady, starring John Boles, Ida Lupino and Jack Oakie.
- The Firefly, starring Jeanette MacDonald and Allan Jones.
- Gangway, starring Jessie Matthews
- Glamorous Night, starring Mary Ellis, Otto Kruger and Victor Jory.
- Head over Heels, starring Jessie Matthews
- Hideaway Girl, starring Shirley Ross, Robert Cummings and Martha Raye. Directed by George Archainbaud.
- High, Wide and Handsome starring Irene Dunne, Dorothy Lamour, Randolph Scott and William Frawley.
- Hit Parade of 1937, starring Frances Langford and Phil Regan and featuring Ivie Anderson and Duke Ellington and his orchestra.
- Hollywood Hotel, starring Dick Powell, Rosemary Lane and Lola Lane, and featuring Frances Langford and Benny Goodman & his Orchestra.
- Jericho, starring Paul Robeson
- La Habanera, starring Zarah Leander
- Let's Make a Night of It, starring Charles "Buddy" Rogers and June Clyde
- The Life of the Party, released September 3, starring Joe Penner, Gene Raymond, Harriet Hilliard and Helen Broderick
- The Lilac Domino (film), starring Michael Bartlett, June Knight, Fred Emney and S.Z. Sakall.
- Love and Hisses, starring Walter Winchell, Ben Bernie, Simone Simon, Bert Lahr and Joan Davis
- Make A Wish, starring Bobby Breen, Basil Rathbone, Marion Claire, Henry Armetta, Ralph Forbes and Leon Errol. Directed by Kurt Neumann.
- Mayfair Melody, starring Keith Falkner, Chili Bouchier and Bruce Lester.
- Maytime, starring Jeanette MacDonald, Nelson Eddy and John Barrymore.
- Melodías porteñas, starring Enrique Santos Discépolo
- Melody for Two, starring James Melton, Patricia Ellis and Wini Shaw
- Mr. Dodd Takes the Air, released August 21, starring Kenny Baker and Jane Wyman.
- My Song Goes Forth, starring Paul Robeson
- On the Avenue, starring Dick Powell, Alice Faye, Madeleine Carroll and The Ritz Brothers.
- 100 Men and a Girl, starring Deanna Durbin
- Paradise for Two directed by Thornton Freeland and starring Jack Hulbert, Patricia Ellis and Arthur Riscoe.
- Rootin' Tootin' Rhythm, starring Gene Autry
- Rosalie, starring Nelson Eddy, Eleanor Powell and Ray Bolger.
- Shall We Dance, starring Fred Astaire and Ginger Rogers.
- The Singing Marine, starring Dick Powell and Doris Weston
- Snow White And The Seven Dwarfs, animated feature with Adriana Caselotti providing the voice of Snow White.
- Something to Sing About, starring James Cagney and Evelyn Daw
- Song at Midnight, directed by Ma-Xu Weibang.
- Song of the Forge, starring Stanley Holloway.
- Stardust, starring Ben Lyon and Lupe Vélez.
- Swing High, Swing Low, released March 15, starring Carole Lombard, Fred MacMurray and Dorothy Lamour.
- This Way Please, starring Charles "Buddy" Rogers, Betty Grable and Ned Sparks
- Top of the Town, starring Doris Nolan, George Murphy and Ella Logan, and featuring Gertrude Niesen
- Turn Off the Moon, starring Charles Ruggles and Eleanore Whitney and featuring Kenny Baker and Phil Harris. Directed by Lewis Seiler.
- Varsity Show, starring Dick Powell, Rosemary Lane and Priscilla Lane and featuring Fred Waring and his Pennsylvanians and Buck and Bubbles
- Waikiki Wedding, starring Bing Crosby, Bob Burns, Martha Raye and Shirley Ross.
- Wake Up And Live, starring Walter Winchell, Alice Faye, Ben Bernie and Patsy Kelly. Directed by Sidney Lanfield.
- When You're in Love, starring Grace Moore and Cary Grant.
- You Can't Have Everything, starring Alice Faye, Don Ameche, The Ritz Brothers and Gypsy Rose Lee.
- You're a Sweetheart, starring Alice Faye and George Murphy.

== Births ==
- January 4
  - Grace Bumbry, African American operatic mezzo-soprano (died 2023)
  - Lorene Mann, American country music singer-songwriter (died 2013)
  - Mickey Stevenson, American songwriter
- January 6
  - Paolo Conte, Italian singer, pianist and composer
  - Doris Troy, R&B singer (died 2004)
- January 8 – Shirley Bassey, Welsh singer
- January 13 – Milka Stojanović, Serbian opera singer (died 2023)
- January 14 – Billie Jo Spears, American country music singer (died 2011)
- January 19
  - Clarence "Frogman" Henry, American R&B singer
  - Giovanna Marini, Italian singer-songwriter
- January 22 – Ryan Davies, Welsh singer-songwriter and comedian (died 1977)
- January 27 – John Ogdon, English pianist (died 1989)
- January 29 – Bobby Scott, American singer-songwriter, pianist and producer (died 1990)
- January 31 – Philip Glass, American composer
- February 1
  - Don Everly, American country-rock musician (The Everly Brothers) (died 2021)
  - Ray Sawyer, American rock singer (Dr. Hook & The Medicine Show) (died 2018)
- February 2
  - Martina Arroyo, American operatic soprano
  - Tom Smothers, American singer, composer and comedian (The Smothers Brothers) (died 2023)
- February 8
  - Manfred Krug, German actor and singer (died 2016)
  - Joe Raposo, composer and lyricist (died 1989)
- February 9 – Hildegard Behrens, operatic soprano (died 2009)
- February 10 – Don Wilson, rock rhythm guitarist (The Ventures) (died 2022)
- February 14
  - Jean Bonhomme, Canadian tenor (died 1986)
  - Magic Sam, American singer and guitarist (died 1969)
- February 15 – Nathan Davis, American hard bop jazz woodwind player (died 2018)
- February 19 – Robert "Bilbo" Walker Jr., American blues guitarist (died 2017)
- February 20 – Nancy Wilson, jazz singer (died 2018)
- February 27 – David Ackles, singer-songwriter (died 1999)
- March 1 – Jimmy Little, Australian guitarist, actor and educator (died 2012)
- March 9 – Azio Corghi, Italian composer and musicologist (died 2022)
- March 17 – Vince Martin, American singer-songwriter (died 2018)
- March 19 – Clarence "Frogman" Henry, American R&B singer
- March 20
  - Jerry Reed, American singer-songwriter, actor and guitarist (died 2008)
  - Eddie Shaw, African-American saxophonist and songwriter (died 2018)
- March 22 – Angelo Badalamenti, screen composer (died 2022)
- March 24 – Billy Stewart, scat singer (died 1970)
- April 5 – Marisa Robles, Spanish harpist
- April 11 – Lando Bartolini, Italian operatic tenor (died 2024)
- April 17 – Don Buchla, American pioneer of the synthesizer (died 2016)
- April 21 – David Lucas, American rock and roll composer, singer and music producer
- May 1 – Bo Nilsson, composer and lyricist (died 2018)
- May 4
  - Dick Dale, surf rock guitarist (died 2019)
  - Ron Carter, American jazz double bassist
- May 5
  - Delia Derbyshire, electronic composer (died 2001)
  - Johnnie Taylor, blues and soul singer (died 2000)
- May 9
  - Sonny Curtis (The Crickets)
  - Dave Prater (Sam & Dave) (died 1988)
- May 13 – Trini Lopez, singer (died 2020)
- May 22 – Facundo Cabral, Argentine singer (died 2011)
- June 2 – Jimmy Jones, singer-songwriter (died 2012)
- June 4 – Freddy Fender, country musician (died 2006)
- June 7
  - Roberto Blanco, German singer
  - Neeme Järvi, Estonian conductor
- June 14 – Renaldo "Obie" Benson, soul and R&B bass singer-songwriter (The Four Tops) (died 2005)
- June 15 – Waylon Jennings, country singer (died 2002)
- June 25 – Eddie Floyd, African-American soul, R&B singer-songwriter
- June 30 – Larry Henley, American singer-songwriter (The Newbeats) (died 2014)
- July 3 – David Shire, American composer
- July 4 – Ray Pillow, American country music singer
- July 6
  - Vladimir Ashkenazy, pianist and conductor
  - Gene Chandler, singer-songwriter
- July 12 – Guy Woolfenden, composer (died 2016)
- July 18 – William Carragan, musicologist (died 2024)
- July 22 – Chuck Jackson, R&B singer (died 2023)
- July 26 – Al Banks (The Turbans)
- August 2 – Garth Hudson, Canadian keyboard player, songwriter and producer (The Band and The Call) (died 2025)
- August 6 – Baden Powell de Aquino, bossa nova guitarist (died 2000)
- August 11 – Shel Talmy, record producer and songwriter (died 2024)
- August 16 – David Behrman, composer and record producer
- August 20
  - Clem Cattini, English session drummer (died 2026)
  - Stelvio Cipriani, Italian composer (died 2018)
  - Jean-Louis Petit, French composer, conductor and organist
- August 27
  - Alice Coltrane, née McLeod, jazz multi-instrumentalist (died 2007)
  - J. D. Crowe, banjoist (died 2021)
- September 10 – Tommy Overstreet, American country singer (died 2015)
- September 11 – Joseph Kobzon, popular singer and politician (died 2018)
- September 17
  - Phil Cracolici, rock singer (The Mystics)
  - Ilarion Ionescu-Galați, Romanian violinist and conductor
- September 30 – Valentin Silvestrov, composer
- October 9 – Joan Carden, operatic soprano
- October 13 – Loris Tjeknavorian, conductor and composer
- October 21 – Norman Wright, doo-wop singer (The Del-Vikings)
- October 25 – Jeanne Black, American singer (died 2014)
- October 29 – Michael Ponti, pianist (died 2022)
- October 31 – Tom Paxton, folk singer-songwriter
- November 1
  - Bill Anderson, American country singer-songwriter
  - Titiek Puspa, Indonesian singer-songwriter (died 2025)
- November 2 – Earl "Speedo" Carroll, American vocalist (The Cadillacs, The Coasters) (died 2012)
- November 6 – Eugene Pitt, American singer (The Jive Five) (died 2018)
- November 15 – Little Willie John, American singer (died 1968)
  - Frank Ifield, British-born Australian yodelling singer (died 2024)
  - Luther Ingram, American soul singer-songwriter (died 2007)
  - Noel Stookey, American singer-songwriter (Peter, Paul & Mary)
- December 1 – Gordon Crosse, English composer (died 2021)
- December 12 – Connie Francis, American pop singer (died 2025)
- December 14 – Warren Ryanes, American bass doo-wop singer (The Monotones) (died 1982)
- December 17 – Art Neville, American rock-soul-jazz singer-songwriter and keyboardist (The Neville Brothers) (died 2019)
- December 19 – Osvaldas Balakauskas, Lithuanian composer (died 2026)
- December 25 – O'Kelly Isley, Jr., American soul singer (The Isley Brothers) (died 1986)
- December 26 – Ronnie Prophet, Canadian-American country musician (died 2018)
- December 28 – Rita Orlandi-Malaspina, Italian operatic soprano (died 2017)
- December 30
  - John Hartford, American folk and country musician and composer (died 2001)
  - Raquel Olmedo, Cuban-Mexican actress and singer
- date unknown – Farhad Fakhreddini, conductor and composer, founder of Iran's National Orchestra

== Deaths ==
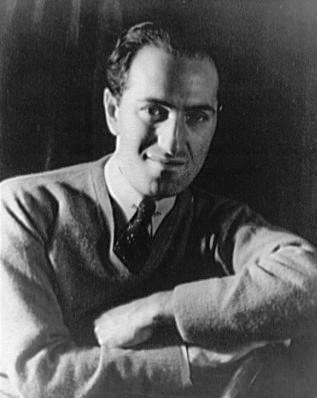
George Gershwin in 1937, the year of his death.

- January 10 – Clarence Eddy, American organist and composer (born 1851)
- January 12 – Barney Fagan, American performer and composer (born 1850)
- January 19 – Aristodemo Giorgini, Italian opera singer (born 1879)
- February 14 – Erkki Melartin, Finnish composer (born 1875)
- March 6 – George Washington Thomas, songwriter and pianist (born 1883)
- March 12
  - Charles-Marie Widor, composer (born 1844)
  - Jenő Hubay, composer and violinist (born 1858)
- March 22 – Thorvald Aagaard, composer (born 1877)
- March 29 – Karol Szymanowski, composer (born 1882)
- April 8 – Arthur Foote, composer (born 1853)
- April 11 – Minnie Bell Sharp, pianist and singer (born 1865)
- April 20 – Virgilio Ranzato, composer (born 1883)
- May 2 – Arthur Somervell, composer (born 1863)
- May 4 – Noel Rosa, singer, songwriter and guitarist (born 1910)
- May 7 – W. O. Forsyth, pianist (born 1859)
- May 11 – Viliam Figuš-Bystrý, composer (born 1875)
- June 2 – Louis Vierne, organist and composer (born 1870)
- June 10 – Malcolm Williams, actor and composer (born 1870)
- July 11 – George Gershwin, composer (born 1898)
- July 17 – Gabriel Pierné, organist and composer (born 1863)
- July 23 – Charles Henry Mills, composer and music teacher (born 1873)
- August 23 – Albert Roussel, composer (born 1869)
- September 6 – Henry Kimball Hadley, composer and conductor (born 1871)
- September 26 – Bessie Smith, blues singer, automobile accident (born 1895)
- October 6 – Blind Uncle Gaspard, Cajun vocalist and guitarist (born 1878)
- October 17 – Paul Lhérie, operatic tenor/baritone (born 1844)
- October 22 – Frank Damrosch, organist, conductor and music teacher (born 1859)
- November 3 – Winthrop Ames, theatrical director (born 1870)
- November 24 – Tell Taylor, songwriter (born 1876)
- November 25 – Lilian Baylis, founder of Sadler's Wells ballet company (born 1874)
- November 29 – Ferdinand Buescher, instrument manufacturer (born 1861)
- December 4 – it:Rodolfo Falvo, composer (born 1873)
- December 10 – Rosa Valetti, cabaret singer (born 1878)
- December 26
  - Dan Beddoe, tenor (born 1863)
  - Ivor Gurney, composer-poet (born 1890)
- December 28 – Maurice Ravel, composer (born 1875)
- date unknown
  - Blind Uncle Gaspard, Cajun musician (born 1880)
  - Maude Valérie White, composer and songwriter (born 1855)
  - Loraine Wyman, folk singer and dulcimer player (born 1885)
