= List of Your Hit Parade number-one songs =

Your Hit Parade was an American radio and television music program that was broadcast from 1935 to 1953 on radio, and seen from 1950 to 1959 on television. In 1935, they began publishing the earliest weekly music chart, preceding the Billboard singles chart, which was updated weekly by the Billboard magazine beginning on July 27, 1940.

The Your Hit Parade chart was established in April 1935, which operated under a proprietary formula to determine the popularity of a song based on five factors, including 1) record sales (divided between a) retail and b) wholesale), 2) sheet-music copies of the song (both retail and wholesale), 3) number of radio plays, a category that is sub-divided between a) plays on the three national networks and b) plays on local stations, 4) plays on jukeboxes, and 5) numbers of requests to orchestra leaders to play a particular song. As such, though the musicians who popularized each song are credited with having done so, this is not exactly the same as them having made a hit record.

== List of number-ones ==
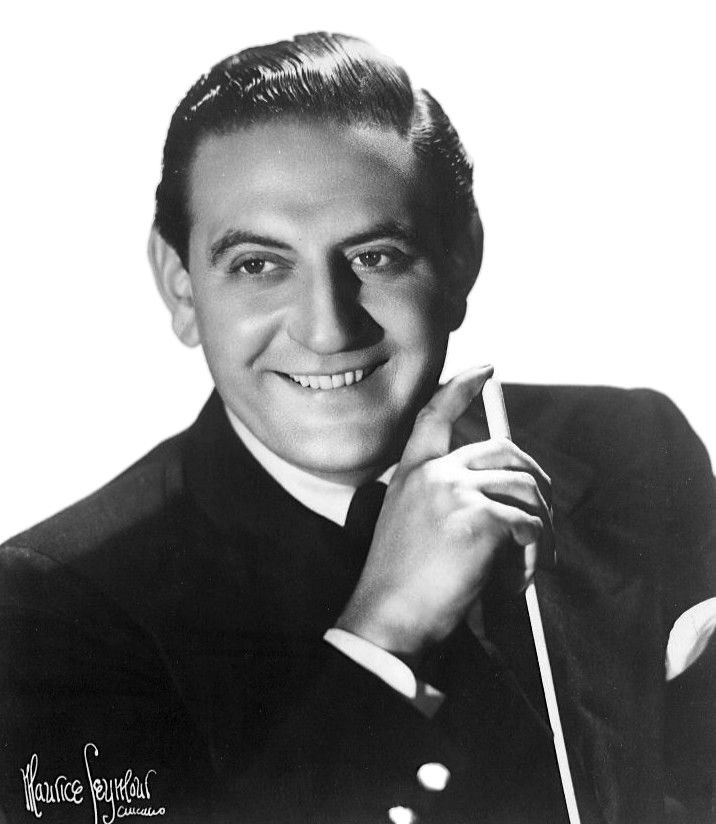
Guy Lombardo replaced himself at number-one a total of seven times, of those with five consecutive, a record, in 1937.

Your Hit Parade
No.	Date(s)	Song	Artist(s)	Record label	Ref
001	April 20, 1935	"Soon"	Bing Crosby with Georgie Stoll and His Orchestra	Decca	
002	April 27, 1935	"Lovely to Look At"	Eddy Duchin and His Orchestra	Victor	
003	May 4, 1935	"Lullaby of Broadway"	Dorsey Brothers' Orchestra	Victor	
003	May 11, 1935	"Lullaby of Broadway"	Dorsey Brothers' Orchestra	Victor	
004	May 18, 1935	"What's the Reason (I'm Not Pleasin' You)"	Guy Lombardo	Decca	
004	May 25, 1935	"What's the Reason (I'm Not Pleasin' You)"	Guy Lombardo	Decca	
005	June 1, 1935	"Life Is a Song"	Ruth Etting	Columbia	
005	June 8, 1935	"Life Is a Song"	Ruth Etting	Columbia	
006	June 15, 1935	"In a Little Gypsy Tea Room"	Bob Crosby	Decca	
007	June 22, 1935	"Chasing Shadows"	The Dorsey Brothers	Decca	
007	June 29, 1935	"Chasing Shadows"	The Dorsey Brothers	Decca	
007	July 6, 1935	"Chasing Shadows"	The Dorsey Brothers	Decca	
re	July 13, 1935	"In a Little Gypsy Tea Room"	Bob Crosby	Decca	
re	July 20, 1935	"Chasing Shadows"	The Dorsey Brothers	Decca	
008	July 27, 1935	"In the Middle of a Kiss"	Hal Kemp	Brunswick	
re	August 3, 1935	"Chasing Shadows"	The Dorsey Brothers	Decca	
009	August 10, 1935	"Paris in the Spring"	Ray Noble and Al Bowlly	Victor	
010	August 17, 1935	"And Then Some"	Ozzie Nelson	Brunswick	
011	August 24, 1935	"East of the Sun (and West of the Moon)"	Tom Coakley	Victor	
012	August 31, 1935	"You're All I Need"	Eddy Duchin	Victor	
re	September 7, 1935	"East of the Sun (and West of the Moon)"	Tom Coakley	Victor	
re	September 14, 1935	"East of the Sun (and West of the Moon)"	Tom Coakley	Victor	
013	September 21, 1935	"I'm in the Mood for Love"	Little Jack Little	Columbia	
014	September 28, 1935	"Cheek to Cheek"	Fred Astaire	Brunswick	
014	October 5, 1935	"Cheek to Cheek"	Fred Astaire	Brunswick	
014	October 12, 1935	"Cheek to Cheek"	Fred Astaire	Brunswick	
014	October 19, 1935	"Cheek to Cheek"	Fred Astaire	Brunswick	
014	October 26, 1935	"Cheek to Cheek"	Fred Astaire	Brunswick	
015	November 2, 1935	"You Are My Lucky Star"	Eddy Duchin	Victor	
015	November 9, 1935	"You Are My Lucky Star"	Eddy Duchin	Victor	
015	November 16, 1935	"You Are My Lucky Star"	Eddy Duchin	Victor	
016	November 23, 1935	"Red Sails in the Sunset"	Guy Lombardo	Decca	
016	November 30, 1935	"Red Sails in the Sunset"	Guy Lombardo	Decca	
016	December 7, 1935	"Red Sails in the Sunset"	Guy Lombardo	Decca	
016	December 14, 1935	"Red Sails in the Sunset"	Guy Lombardo	Decca	
017	December 21, 1935	"On Treasure Island"	Tommy Dorsey	Columbia	
018	December 28, 1935	"A Little Bit Independent"	Fats Waller	Victor	
018	January 4, 1936	"A Little Bit Independent"	Fats Waller	Victor	
019	January 11, 1936	"The Music Goes Round and Round"	Tommy Dorsey	Victor	
019	January 18, 1936	"The Music Goes Round and Round"	Tommy Dorsey	Victor	
019	January 25, 1936	"The Music Goes Round and Round"	Tommy Dorsey	Victor	
020	February 1, 1936	"Moon Over Miami"	Eddy Duchin	Victor	
021	February 8, 1936	"Alone"	Tommy Dorsey	Victor	
021	February 15, 1936	"Alone"	Tommy Dorsey	Victor	
021	February 22, 1936	"Alone"	Tommy Dorsey	Victor	
021	February 29, 1936	"Alone"	Tommy Dorsey	Victor	
022	March 7, 1936	"Lights Out"	Eddy Duchin	Victor	
re	March 14, 1936	"Alone"	Tommy Dorsey	Victor	
re	March 21, 1936	"Lights Out"	Eddy Duchin	Victor	
023	March 28, 1936	"Goody Goody"	Benny Goodman	Victor	
023	April 4, 1936	"Goody Goody"	Benny Goodman	Victor	
023	April 11, 1936	"Goody Goody"	Benny Goodman	Victor	
023	April 18, 1936	"Goody Goody"	Benny Goodman	Victor	
024	April 25, 1936	"Lost"	Guy Lombardo	Victor	
024	May 2, 1936	"Lost"	Guy Lombardo	Victor	
024	May 9, 1936	"Lost"	Guy Lombardo	Victor	
025	May 16, 1936	"Melody from the Sky"	Jan Garber	Decca	
026	May 23, 1936	"You"	Tommy Dorsey	Victor	
re	May 30, 1936	"Lost"	Guy Lombardo	Victor	
027	June 6, 1936	"Is It True What They Say About Dixie?"	Jimmy Dorsey	Decca	
027	June 13, 1936	"Is It True What They Say About Dixie?"	Jimmy Dorsey	Decca	
027	June 20, 1936	"Is It True What They Say About Dixie?"	Jimmy Dorsey	Decca	
027	June 27, 1936	"Is It True What They Say About Dixie?"	Jimmy Dorsey	Decca	
028	July 4, 1936	"The Glory of Love"	Benny Goodman	Victor	
re	July 11, 1936	"Is It True What They Say About Dixie?"	Jimmy Dorsey	Decca	
029	July 18, 1936	"Take My Heart"	Eddy Duchin	Victor	
029	July 25, 1936	"Take My Heart"	Eddy Duchin	Victor	
030	August 1, 1936	"These Foolish Things (Remind Me of You)"	Benny Goodman	Victor	
030	August 8, 1936	"These Foolish Things (Remind Me of You)"	Benny Goodman	Victor	
031	August 15, 1936	"When I'm With You"	Hal Kemp	Brunswick	
031	August 22, 1936	"When I'm With You"	Hal Kemp	Brunswick	
032	August 29, 1936	"Did I Remember"	Shep Fields	Bluebird	
032	September 5, 1936	"Did I Remember"	Shep Fields	Bluebird	
032	September 12, 1936	"Did I Remember"	Shep Fields	Bluebird	
032	September 19, 1936	"Did I Remember"	Shep Fields	Bluebird	
032	September 26, 1936	"Did I Remember"	Shep Fields	Bluebird	
032	October 3, 1936	"Did I Remember"	Shep Fields	Bluebird	
033	October 10, 1936	"When Did You Leave Heaven"	Guy Lombardo	Victor	
033	October 17, 1936	"When Did You Leave Heaven"	Guy Lombardo	Victor	
034	October 24, 1936	"The Way You Look Tonight"	Fred Astaire	Brunswick	
034	October 31, 1936	"The Way You Look Tonight"	Fred Astaire	Brunswick	
034	November 7, 1936	"The Way You Look Tonight"	Fred Astaire	Brunswick	
034	November 14, 1936	"The Way You Look Tonight"	Fred Astaire	Brunswick	
034	November 21, 1936	"The Way You Look Tonight"	Fred Astaire	Brunswick	
034	November 28, 1936	"The Way You Look Tonight"	Fred Astaire	Brunswick	
035	December 5, 1936	"I'll Sing You a Thousand Love Songs"	Eddy Duchin	Victor	
036	December 12, 1936	"In the Chapel in the Moonlight"	Shep Fields	Bluebird	
037	December 19, 1936	"Pennies from Heaven"	Bing Crosby	Decca	
re	December 26, 1936	"In the Chapel in the Moonlight"	Shep Fields	Bluebird	
re	January 2, 1937	"In the Chapel in the Moonlight"	Shep Fields	Bluebird	
re	January 9, 1937	"Pennies from Heaven"	Bing Crosby	Decca	
038	January 16, 1937	"It's De-Lovely"	Eddy Duchin	Victor	
re	January 23, 1937	"Pennies from Heaven"	Bing Crosby	Decca	
re	January 30, 1937	"Pennies from Heaven"	Bing Crosby	Decca	
039	February 6, 1937	"Goodnight My Love"	Benny Goodman	Victor	
039	February 13, 1937	"Goodnight My Love"	Benny Goodman	Victor	
040	February 20, 1937	"With Plenty of Money and You"	Henry Busse	Decca	
re	February 27, 1937	"Goodnight My Love"	Benny Goodman	Victor	
re	March 6, 1937	"Goodnight My Love"	Benny Goodman	Victor	
041	March 13, 1937	"When My Dream Boat Comes Home"	Guy Lombardo	Victor	
042	March 20, 1937	"This Year's Kisses"	Benny Goodman	Victor	
042	March 27, 1937	"This Year's Kisses"	Benny Goodman	Victor	
043	April 3, 1937	"Boo-Hoo"	Guy Lombardo	Victor	
043	April 10, 1937	"Boo-Hoo"	Guy Lombardo	Victor	
043	April 17, 1937	"Boo-Hoo"	Guy Lombardo	Victor	
043	April 24, 1937	"Boo-Hoo"	Guy Lombardo	Victor	
043	May 1, 1937	"Boo-Hoo"	Guy Lombardo	Victor	
043	May 8, 1937	"Boo-Hoo"	Guy Lombardo	Victor	
044	May 15, 1937	"September in the Rain"	Guy Lombardo	Victor	
045	May 22, 1937	"Carelessly"	Teddy Wilson and Billie Holiday	Brunswick	
045	May 29, 1937	"Carelessly"	Teddy Wilson and Billie Holiday	Brunswick	
re	June 5, 1937	"September in the Rain"	Guy Lombardo	Victor	
re	June 12, 1937	"September in the Rain"	Guy Lombardo	Victor	
re	June 19, 1937	"September in the Rain"	Guy Lombardo	Victor	
re	June 26, 1937	"September in the Rain"	Guy Lombardo	Victor	
046	July 3, 1937	"It Looks Like Rain in Cherry Blossom Lane"	Guy Lombardo	Victor	
046	July 10, 1937	"It Looks Like Rain in Cherry Blossom Lane"	Guy Lombardo	Victor	
046	July 17, 1937	"It Looks Like Rain in Cherry Blossom Lane"	Guy Lombardo	Victor	
046	July 24, 1937	"It Looks Like Rain in Cherry Blossom Lane"	Guy Lombardo	Victor	
046	July 31, 1937	"It Looks Like Rain in Cherry Blossom Lane"	Guy Lombardo	Victor	
047	August 7, 1937	"A Sailboat in the Moonlight"	Guy Lombardo	Victor	
re	August 14, 1937	"It Looks Like Rain in Cherry Blossom Lane"	Guy Lombardo	Victor	
re	August 21, 1937	"A Sailboat in the Moonlight"	Guy Lombardo	Victor	
re	August 28, 1937	"A Sailboat in the Moonlight"	Guy Lombardo	Victor	
048	September 4, 1937	"Whispers in the Dark"	Bob Crosby	Decca	
049	September 11, 1937	"So Rare"	Guy Lombardo	Victor	
re	September 18, 1937	"Whispers in the Dark"	Bob Crosby	Decca	
re	September 25, 1937	"Whispers in the Dark"	Bob Crosby	Decca	
re	October 2, 1937	"Whispers in the Dark"	Bob Crosby	Decca	
050	October 9, 1937	"That Old Feeling"	Shep Fields	Bluebird	
050	October 16, 1937	"That Old Feeling"	Shep Fields	Bluebird	
050	October 23, 1937	"That Old Feeling"	Shep Fields	Bluebird	
050	October 30, 1937	"That Old Feeling"	Shep Fields	Bluebird	
051	November 6, 1937	"Remember Me?"	Bing Crosby	Decca	
052	November 13, 1937	"You Can't Stop Me From Dreaming"	Teddy Wilson	Brunswick	
053	November 20, 1937	"Vieni, Vieni"	Rudy Vallee	Bluebird	
054	November 27, 1937	"Once in a While"	Tommy Dorsey	Victor	
054	December 4, 1937	"Once in a While"	Tommy Dorsey	Victor	
054	December 11, 1937	"Once in a While"	Tommy Dorsey	Victor	
054	December 18, 1937	"Once in a While"	Tommy Dorsey	Victor	
054	December 25, 1937	"Once in a While"	Tommy Dorsey	Victor	
054	January 1, 1938	"Once in a While"	Tommy Dorsey	Victor	
054	January 8, 1938	"Once in a While"	Tommy Dorsey	Victor	
055	January 15, 1938	"Rosalie"	Sing and Sway with Sammy Kaye	Vocalion	
056	January 22, 1938	"Bei Mir Bist Du Schön"	The Andrews Sisters	Decca	
057	January 29, 1938	"You're a Sweetheart"	Dolly Dawn	Vocalion	
re	February 5, 1938	"Rosalie"	Sing and Sway with Sammy Kaye	Vocalion	
re	February 12, 1938	"Bei Mir Bist Du Schön"	The Andrews Sisters	Decca	
re	February 19, 1938	"You're a Sweetheart"	Dolly Dawn	Vocalion	
058	February 26, 1938	"I Double Dare You"	Russ Morgan	Brunswick	
059	March 5, 1938	"Thanks for the Memory"	Shep Fields	Bluebird	
059	March 12, 1938	"Thanks for the Memory"	Shep Fields	Bluebird	
059	March 19, 1938	"Thanks for the Memory"	Shep Fields	Bluebird	
060	March 26, 1938	"Ti-Pi-Tin"	Horace Heidt	Brunswick	
060	April 2, 1938	"Ti-Pi-Tin"	Horace Heidt	Brunswick	
060	April 9, 1938	"Ti-Pi-Tin"	Horace Heidt	Brunswick	
060	April 16, 1938	"Ti-Pi-Tin"	Horace Heidt	Brunswick	
060	April 23, 1938	"Ti-Pi-Tin"	Horace Heidt	Brunswick	
060	April 30, 1938	"Ti-Pi-Tin"	Horace Heidt	Brunswick	
061	May 7, 1938	"Please Be Kind"	Red Norvo and Mildred Bailey	Brunswick	
062	May 14, 1938	"Love Walked In"	Sing and Sway with Sammy Kaye	Vocalion	
062	May 21, 1938	"Love Walked In"	Sing and Sway with Sammy Kaye	Vocalion	
062	May 28, 1938	"Love Walked In"	Sing and Sway with Sammy Kaye	Vocalion	
062	June 4, 1938	"Love Walked In"	Sing and Sway with Sammy Kaye	Vocalion	
063	June 11, 1938	"Cry, Baby, Cry"	Larry Clinton and Bea Wain	Victor	
064	June 18, 1938	"Says My Heart"	Red Norvo and Mildred Bailey	Brunswick	
064	June 25, 1938	"Says My Heart"	Red Norvo and Mildred Bailey	Brunswick	
064	July 2, 1938	"Says My Heart"	Red Norvo and Mildred Bailey	Brunswick	
064	July 9, 1938	"Says My Heart"	Red Norvo and Mildred Bailey	Brunswick	
065	July 16, 1938	"Music, Maestro, Please"	Tommy Dorsey and Edythe Wright	Victor	
065	July 23, 1938	"Music, Maestro, Please"	Tommy Dorsey and Edythe Wright	Victor	
066	July 30, 1938	"I Let a Song Go Out of My Heart"	Duke Ellington	Brunswick	
re	August 6, 1938	"Music, Maestro, Please"	Tommy Dorsey and Edythe Wright	Victor	
re	August 13, 1938	"Music, Maestro, Please"	Tommy Dorsey and Edythe Wright	Victor	
067	August 20, 1938	"A-Tisket, A-Tasket"	Chick Webb and Ella Fitzgerald	Decca	
067	August 27, 1938	"A-Tisket, A-Tasket"	Chick Webb and Ella Fitzgerald	Decca	
067	September 3, 1938	"A-Tisket, A-Tasket"	Chick Webb and Ella Fitzgerald	Decca	
067	September 10, 1938	"A-Tisket, A-Tasket"	Chick Webb and Ella Fitzgerald	Decca	
067	September 17, 1938	"A-Tisket, A-Tasket"	Chick Webb and Ella Fitzgerald	Decca	
067	September 24, 1938	"A-Tisket, A-Tasket"	Chick Webb and Ella Fitzgerald	Decca	
068	October 1, 1938	"I've Got a Pocketful of Dreams"	Bing Crosby	Decca	
068	October 8, 1938	"I've Got a Pocketful of Dreams"	Bing Crosby	Decca	
069	October 15, 1938	"Change Partners"	Fred Astaire	Brunswick	
re	October 22, 1938	"I've Got a Pocketful of Dreams"	Bing Crosby	Decca	
re	October 29, 1938	"I've Got a Pocketful of Dreams"	Bing Crosby	Decca	
re	November 5, 1938	"Change Partners"	Fred Astaire	Brunswick	
070	November 12, 1938	"My Reverie"	Larry Clinton and Bea Wain	Victor	
070	November 19, 1938	"My Reverie"	Larry Clinton and Bea Wain	Victor	
070	November 26, 1938	"My Reverie"	Larry Clinton and Bea Wain	Victor	
070	December 3, 1938	"My Reverie"	Larry Clinton and Bea Wain	Victor	
070	December 10, 1938	"My Reverie"	Larry Clinton and Bea Wain	Victor	
070	December 17, 1938	"My Reverie"	Larry Clinton and Bea Wain	Victor	
070	December 24, 1938	"My Reverie"	Larry Clinton and Bea Wain	Victor	
071	December 31, 1938	"You Must Have Been a Beautiful Baby"	Bing Crosby	Decca	
re	January 7, 1939	"My Reverie"	Larry Clinton and Bea Wain	Victor	
re	January 14, 1939	"You Must Have Been a Beautiful Baby"	Bing Crosby	Decca	
072	January 21, 1939	"Jeepers Creepers"	Al Donahue	Vocalion	
re	January 28, 1939	"You Must Have Been a Beautiful Baby"	Bing Crosby	Decca	
re	February 4, 1939	"Jeepers Creepers"	Al Donahue	Vocalion	
re	February 11, 1939	"Jeepers Creepers"	Al Donahue	Vocalion	
re	February 18, 1939	"Jeepers Creepers"	Al Donahue	Vocalion	
re	February 25, 1939	"Jeepers Creepers"	Al Donahue	Vocalion	
073	March 4, 1939	"Deep Purple"	Larry Clinton and Bea Wain	Victor	
073	March 11, 1939	"Deep Purple"	Larry Clinton and Bea Wain	Victor	
073	March 18, 1939	"Deep Purple"	Larry Clinton and Bea Wain	Victor	
073	March 25, 1939	"Deep Purple"	Larry Clinton and Bea Wain	Victor	
073	April 1, 1939	"Deep Purple"	Larry Clinton and Bea Wain	Victor	
073	April 8, 1939	"Deep Purple"	Larry Clinton and Bea Wain	Victor	
073	April 15, 1939	"Deep Purple"	Larry Clinton and Bea Wain	Victor	
074	April 22, 1939	"Heaven Can Wait"	Glen Gray	Decca	
074	April 29, 1939	"Heaven Can Wait"	Glen Gray	Decca	
075	May 6, 1939	"Our Love"	Tommy Dorsey	Victor	
075	May 13, 1939	"Our Love"	Tommy Dorsey	Victor	
076	May 20, 1939	"And the Angels Sing"	Benny Goodman and Martha Tilton	Victor	
076	May 27, 1939	"And the Angels Sing"	Benny Goodman and Martha Tilton	Victor	
076	June 3, 1939	"And the Angels Sing"	Benny Goodman and Martha Tilton	Victor	
076	June 10, 1939	"And the Angels Sing"	Benny Goodman and Martha Tilton	Victor	
077	June 17, 1939	"Wishing (Will Make It So)"	Glenn Miller	Bluebird	
077	June 24, 1939	"Wishing (Will Make It So)"	Glenn Miller	Bluebird	
077	July 1, 1939	"Wishing (Will Make It So)"	Glenn Miller	Bluebird	
077	July 8, 1939	"Wishing (Will Make It So)"	Glenn Miller	Bluebird	
078	July 15, 1939	"Stairway to the Stars"	Glenn Miller	Bluebird	
078	July 22, 1939	"Stairway to the Stars"	Glenn Miller	Bluebird	
078	July 29, 1939	"Stairway to the Stars"	Glenn Miller	Bluebird	
078	August 5, 1939	"Stairway to the Stars"	Glenn Miller	Bluebird	
079	August 12, 1939	"Moon Love"	Glenn Miller	Bluebird	
079	August 19, 1939	"Moon Love"	Glenn Miller	Bluebird	
079	August 26, 1939	"Moon Love"	Glenn Miller	Bluebird	
079	September 2, 1939	"Moon Love"	Glenn Miller	Bluebird	
080	September 9, 1939	"Over the Rainbow"	Glenn Miller	Bluebird	
080	September 16, 1939	"Over the Rainbow"	Glenn Miller	Bluebird	
080	September 23, 1939	"Over the Rainbow"	Glenn Miller	Bluebird	
080	September 30, 1939	"Over the Rainbow"	Glenn Miller	Bluebird	
080	October 7, 1939	"Over the Rainbow"	Glenn Miller	Bluebird	
080	October 14, 1939	"Over the Rainbow"	Glenn Miller	Bluebird	
081	October 21, 1939	"Day In, Day Out"	Bob Crosby	Decca	
re	October 28, 1939	"Over the Rainbow"	Glenn Miller	Bluebird	
082	November 4, 1939	"Blue Orchids"	Glenn Miller	Bluebird	
083	November 11, 1939	"South of the Border (Down Mexico Way)"	Shep Fields	Bluebird	
083	November 18, 1939	"South of the Border (Down Mexico Way)"	Shep Fields	Bluebird	
083	November 25, 1939	"South of the Border (Down Mexico Way)"	Shep Fields	Bluebird	
084	December 2, 1939	"Scatter-Brain"	Frankie Masters	Vocalion	
re	December 9, 1939	"South of the Border (Down Mexico Way)"	Shep Fields	Bluebird	
re	December 16, 1939	"Scatter-Brain"	Frankie Masters	Vocalion	
re	December 23, 1939	"South of the Border (Down Mexico Way)"	Shep Fields	Bluebird	
re	December 30, 1939	"Scatter-Brain"	Frankie Masters	Vocalion	
re	January 6, 1940	"Scatter-Brain"	Frankie Masters	Vocalion	
re	January 13, 1940	"Scatter-Brain"	Frankie Masters	Vocalion	
re	January 20, 1940	"Scatter-Brain"	Frankie Masters	Vocalion	
085	January 27, 1940	"All the Things You Are"	Tommy Dorsey	Victor	
086	February 3, 1940	"Careless"	Glenn Miller	Bluebird	
re	February 10, 1940	"All the Things You Are"	Tommy Dorsey	Victor	
re	February 17, 1940	"Careless"	Glenn Miller	Bluebird	
087	February 24, 1940	"Indian Summer"	Tommy Dorsey	Victor	
re	March 2, 1940	"Careless"	Glenn Miller	Bluebird	
re	March 9, 1940	"Careless"	Glenn Miller	Bluebird	
088	March 16, 1940	"Darn That Dream"	Benny Goodman	Columbia	
re	March 23, 1940	"Careless"	Glenn Miller	Bluebird	
089	March 30, 1940	"When You Wish Upon a Star"	Glenn Miller	Bluebird	
089	April 6, 1940	"When You Wish Upon a Star"	Glenn Miller	Bluebird	
089	April 13, 1940	"When You Wish Upon a Star"	Glenn Miller	Bluebird	
089	April 20, 1940	"When You Wish Upon a Star"	Glenn Miller	Bluebird	
089	April 27, 1940	"When You Wish Upon a Star"	Glenn Miller	Bluebird	
090	May 4, 1940	"The Woodpecker Song"	Glenn Miller	Bluebird	
090	May 11, 1940	"The Woodpecker Song"	Glenn Miller	Bluebird	
090	May 18, 1940	"The Woodpecker Song"	Glenn Miller	Bluebird	
090	May 25, 1940	"The Woodpecker Song"	Glenn Miller	Bluebird	
090	June 1, 1940	"The Woodpecker Song"	Glenn Miller	Bluebird	
090	June 8, 1940	"The Woodpecker Song"	Glenn Miller	Bluebird	
090	June 15, 1940	"The Woodpecker Song"	Glenn Miller	Bluebird	
091	June 22, 1940	"Imagination"	Glenn Miller	Bluebird	
092	June 29, 1940	"Make Believe Island"	Mitchell Ayres	Bluebird	
re	July 6, 1940	"Imagination"	Glenn Miller	Bluebird	
re	July 13, 1940	"Imagination"	Glenn Miller	Bluebird	
093	July 20, 1940	"Fools Rush In (Where Angels Fear to Tread)"	Glenn Miller	Bluebird	

== Statistical trivia ==
=== By artist ===
The following artists achieved three or more number-one hits during the period 1935–1940. A number of artists had number-one singles on their own as well as part of a collaboration.

Artist	Number-one hits
Glenn Miller	10
Guy Lombardo	10
Tommy Dorsey†	10
Eddy Duchin	8
Benny Goodman	7
Shep Fields	5
Bing Crosby	5
Larry Clinton	3
Bob Crosby	3

† Includes two number-one hits co-leading the Dorsey Brothers

=== Artists by total number of weeks at number one ===
The following artists were featured at the top of the chart for the highest total number of weeks during 1935–1940.

Artist	Weeks at number one
Glenn Miller	45
Guy Lombardo	33
Tommy Dorsey	32†
Shep Fields	20
Benny Goodman	17
Larry Clinton	17
Bing Crosby	13
Fred Astaire	13

† Includes 2 number-one hits co-leading The Dorsey Brothers

=== Songs by total number of weeks at number-one ===
The following songs (21 total) reached number-one for five weeks or more from 1935 to 1940.

Weeks at number-one	Song	Artist(s)
8	"My Reverie"	Larry Clinton
7	"Once in a While"	Tommy Dorsey
7	"Deep Purple"	Larry Clinton
7	"Over the Rainbow"	Glenn Miller
7	"The Woodpecker Song"	Glenn Miller
6	"Did I Remember"	Shep Fields
6	"The Way You Look Tonight"	Fred Astaire
6	"Boo-Hoo"	Guy Lombardo
6	"It Looks Like Rain in Cherry Blossom Lane"	Guy Lombardo
6	"Ti-Pi-Pin"	Horace Heidt
6	"A-Tisket, A-Tasket"	Chick Webb and Ella Fitzgerald
6	"Scatter-Brain"	Frankie Masters
5	"Chasing Shadows"	The Dorsey Brothers
5	"Cheek to Cheek"	Fred Astaire
5	"Alone"	Tommy Dorsey
5	"Is It True What They Say About Dixie?"	Jimmy Dorsey
5	"September in the Rain"	Guy Lombardo
5	"Jeepers Creepers"	Al Donahue
5	"South of the Border (Down Mexico Way)"	Shep Fields
5	"Careless"	Glenn Miller
5	"When You Wish Upon a Star"	Glenn Miller

== See also ==
- List of Billboard number-one singles
- 1930s in music
