= With a Smile and a Song =

With a Smile and a Song may refer to:

- With a Smile and a Song (album), a 1964 album featuring Doris Day
- "With a Smile and a Song" (song), a 1937 song by Frank Churchill and Larry Morey
