= Goodbye Mama (I'm off to Yokohama) =

Song
- Language: English
- Published: 1941
- Songwriter: J. Fred Coots

"Goodbye Mama (I'm off to Yokohama)" is a World War II song written and composed by J. Fred Coots about the Pacific Theatre. The wartime song was first published in 1941 by Chappell and Co. in New York, NY. The song has a march-tempo, 4/4 meter with some syncopated rhythm. The tune is cheery and akin to a Boy Scout hiking song.

The song was recorded in 1942 by a number of artists, including Dick Robertson, Frankie Masters, and Teddy Powell.

A cover version, "Goodbye Maria (I'm Off To Korea)", was recorded by country musician Wilf Carter in 1950.

A dark humor satirical version, "So Long, Mom (A Song For World War III) written and published by Tom Lehrer in 1965 uses the same tune and rhyme scheme, referring to World War Three and an eventual Nuclear Holocaust.

The sheet music can be found at the Pritzker Military Museum & Library.

== Bibliography ==
- Cooper, B. Lee, and Wayne S. Haney. 1999. Rock music in American popular culture III, III. Rock Music in American Popular Culture. New York: Haworth Press. ISBN 9780789004901. OCLC 772542638
- Jasen, David A. 1988. Tin Pan Alley: the composers, the songs, the performers, and their times: the golden age of American popular music from 1886 to 1956. New York: D.I. Fine.ISBN 9781-5561-1099-3. OCLC 18135644
- Jones, John Bush. 2006. The songs that fought the war: popular music and the home front: 1939-1945. Hanover: Univ. Press of New England. ISBN 1584654430. OCLC 237080140
- Smith, Kathleen E. R. God Bless America: Tin Pan Alley Goes to War. Lexington, KY: University Press of Kentucky, 2003. Print. ISBN 0-8131-2256-2. OCLC 50868277
- Zinsser, William. 2006. Easy to remember: the great American songwriters and their songs. Jaffrey, N.H.: David R. Godine. ISBN 9781567923254. OCLC 150438201
