= The Song Is Ended (but the Melody Lingers On) =

1927 song by Irving Berlin

Song
- Published: 1927
- Songwriter: Irving Berlin

"The Song Is Ended (but the Melody Lingers On)" is a popular song composed by Irving Berlin in 1927. Early hits in 1928 were by Ruth Etting and by Whispering Jack Smith. In 1948, Nellie Lutcher and Her Rhythm briefly charted with the song.

== Song influence ==
- The song's lyric is referenced in Ira Gershwin's verse to "They Can't Take That Away from Me", in the line "the song is ended, but as the songwriter wrote, the melody lingers on". Berlin himself used the "melody lingers on" idea in the opening line of the verse to his earlier song "All Alone" (1924): "Just like a melody that lingers on / You seem to haunt me night and day."

== Other recordings ==
The song has been recorded by numerous singers over the years, including:

- Ella Fitzgerald on her award-winning, Ella Fitzgerald Sings the Irving Berlin Songbook (1958).
- John C. Reilly on What's Not to Love? (2025).
