= Heart of Darkness (Once Upon a Time) =

- Once Upon a Time episode
- Episode no.: Season 1 Episode 16
- Directed by: Dean White
- Written by: Andrew Chambliss; Ian B. Goldberg
- Original air date: March 18, 2012

Guest appearances
- Lee Arenberg as Grumpy; Meghan Ory as Red Riding Hood

Episode chronology
← Previous "Red-Handed"	Next → "Hat Trick"
- Once Upon a Time season 1

"Heart of Darkness" is the 16th episode of the American fairy tale/drama television series Once Upon a Time, which aired in the United States on ABC on March 18, 2012.

The series takes place in the fictional seaside town of Storybrooke, Maine, in which the residents are actually characters from various fairy tales that were transported to the "real world" town by a powerful curse.

In this episode, Mary Margaret hires Mr. Gold as her attorney; and David tries to find out the truth. In flashbacks, Charming must stop Snow from killing the queen.

It was co-written by Ian B. Goldberg and Andrew Chambliss, while Dean White directed.

== Title card ==
Jiminy Cricket waves from the Enchanted Forest.

== Plot ==
=== In the characters' past ===
In the Enchanted Forest, King George's men catch up with Prince Charming (Josh Dallas) and Red Riding Hood (Meghan Ory). To cover the prince's escape, Red throws off her cloak under the full moon, which lets her transform into the wolf. Back in the cottage, Snow White (Ginnifer Goodwin) is humming "With a Smile and a Song," seemingly content, until she spots a bluebird, which she swats violently. Grumpy (Lee Arenberg) enters to ask her to come to dinner, but it turns out that the dwarves have arranged an intervention with the help of Jiminy Cricket (Raphael Sbarge). They explain to Snow that she has been angry and unfriendly since she drank the amnesia potion. Snow blames her ire on the Evil Queen (Lana Parrilla), and decides to take revenge on her instead. Snow learns that the Queen will soon be en route to her summer palace.

Grumpy hopes to find a potion that will reverse Snow's predicament, but is told by Rumpelstiltskin (Robert Carlyle) that "no potion can bring back true love," saying that "if you can bottle love, you can do anything." Snow tells Rumpelstiltskin that she does not desire to have her love back anyway, but instead wants his help in killing the Queen, so he gives her a magical bow and arrow. After Snow has left, Charming asks Rumpelstiltskin to undo the potion. Rumpelstiltskin reminds him that true love's kiss can break any spell and gives him a map of Snow's whereabouts in exchange for Charming's cloak. Hours later in the woods, Charming ambushes her from behind, kissing her passionately. However, Snow still does not remember who he is, and knocks him unconscious and ties him to a tree. Moments later Jiminy arrives and sets Charming free, then mentions that Snow is not going to remember who Charming is until she remembers herself.

Snow prepares to strike the Queen riding out in the open but Charming dives into the arrow's path taking it in the shoulder. Charming reminds Snow that he would die for her, which Snow is touched by. He then kisses her again and she begins to remember, cured from the spell from the amnesia potion, but their reunion is short-lived as King George's army finds Charming and Snow, as Snow is shoved away while Charming is put into a moving prison. Snow swears she will find him and as she returns to the Dwarfs' cottage to apologize for her actions towards them, the dwarves reunite with her, seeing that she is freed from the potion's effects and is her real self again, and agree to help with their plans to rescue Charming. Meanwhile, Rumpelstiltskin takes a hair from Charming's cloak and pairs it with Snow's hair, then bottles it successfully, labeling it "True Love."

=== In Storybrooke ===
At the Sheriff's office, Emma Swan (Jennifer Morrison), despite believing Mary Margaret's (Goodwin) innocence in Kathryn's (Anastasia Griffith) murder, photographs Mary Margaret for her mug shots. Regina (Parrilla) joins the two as Emma questions Mary Margaret. Emma pulls out the box that the heart was found in. To Mary Margaret's surprise, it is her jewelry box and states it must have been stolen. Regina states that she does not believe her. Henry (Jared S. Gilmore) says that Regina has a motive: she hates Snow White. Emma finds no signs of a break-in, but hears rattling coming from the heating vent. Upon opening it, she finds a hunter's knife inside, which matches the weapon that was used in the murder.

Later on at Granny's, August (Eion Bailey) approaches Henry to talk to him. August tells Henry that he believes that his book could be more than just stories. August says he has come to make people like Emma believe, but Emma won't go off of blind faith; she needs proof. August then hints that the answers to Henry's problems are instead in the book itself. Despite Emma's reservations about Mr. Gold (Carlyle), Mary Margaret hires him as her lawyer. Later, Henry finds the ring of keys in Regina's office and shows them to Emma, telling her that he thinks Regina used the keys to get into their apartment to steal the jewelry box and plant the hunting knife. Emma has a hard time believing him until Henry uses one of the keys to open the door.

Meanwhile, David (Dallas) speaks with Regina, saying that he believes in Mary Margaret's innocence. Regina tells him that everyone has a dark side. David accuses himself, blaming his blackouts. During a session with Archie (Sbarge), David goes under hypnosis to remember what happened during the blackouts, and has a flashback to the Enchanted Forest, where he is telling Snow not to murder the Evil Queen. He tells Mary Margaret about the vision but doesn't realize that this is a flashback to the Enchanted Forest, not the Storybrooke woods. When he asks Mary Margaret whether or not she killed Kathryn, Mary Margaret tells him to leave, upset that he does not believe her. Not long after the confrontation, Mary Margaret discovers a key in her cell. Emma tells Mary Margaret that the DNA test results came back and the heart was Kathryn's, but tells Mary Margaret she believes Mary Margaret is being framed. However, Emma states that they must keep this idea a secret in order to have an advantage over Regina. Afterwards, Emma approaches Mr. Gold for help in the case, determined to prove that Regina is behind the murder. At the end of the episode, Mary Margaret's jail cell is shown to be empty.

== Production ==
"Heart of Darkness" was co-written by Andrew Chambliss and Ian B. Goldberg, while V veteran, Dean White, returned to direct the installment. The episode was included in Reawakened: A Once Upon a Time Tale – a novelization of the first season – which was published by Hyperion Books in 2013.

== Reception ==
=== Ratings ===
The episode's ratings and viewership was down slightly, but remained steady from the previous week, scoring an 18-49 rating of 2.9/8 and was watched by 8.69 million viewers. Despite this setback, it placed first in its timeslot.

In Canada, the episode finished in fifteenth place for the week with an estimated 1.254 million viewers, a decrease from the 1.512 million of the previous episode.

== Cast ==
=== Starring ===
- Ginnifer Goodwin as Snow White/Mary Margaret Blanchard
- Jennifer Morrison as Emma Swan
- Lana Parrilla as Evil Queen/Regina Mills
- Josh Dallas as Prince Charming/David Nolan
- Eion Bailey as August Booth
- Jared S. Gilmore as Henry Mills
- Raphael Sbarge as Jiminy Cricket (voice)/Archie Hopper
- Robert Carlyle as Rumplestiltskin/Mr. Gold

=== Guest Starring ===
- Lee Arenberg as Grumpy
- Meghan Ory as Red Riding Hood/Ruby

=== Co-Starring ===
- Michael Coleman as Happy
- Faustino di Bauda as Sleepy
- Edward Foy as Black Knight
- David-Paul Grove as Doc
- Jeffrey Kaiser as Dopey
- Gabe Khouth as Sneezy
- Mig Macario as Bashful
- Jim Shield as Royal Guard
