= Slumming on Park Avenue =

"Slumming on Park Avenue" is a popular song written by Irving Berlin for the 1937 film On the Avenue, where it was introduced by Alice Faye. Popular recordings in 1937 were by Red Norvo and his Orchestra (vocal by Mildred Bailey), Fletcher Henderson (vocal: Jerry Blake) and by Jimmie Lunceford.

== Other notable recordings ==
- Petula Clark - You Are My Lucky Star (1957).
- Ella Fitzgerald - Ella Fitzgerald Sings the Irving Berlin Songbook (1958)
