= Bob Johnstone (singer) =

American singer

Bob Johnstone (September 22, 1916 – May 6, 1994) was an American traditional pop music singer. His birthname was Robert Morton Johnston.

Johnstone was born Chattanooga, Tennessee, moving with his family to Atlanta, then to the family hometown of Nashville, Tennessee, where he grew up. In 1938 he married Georgia Frances Byram; they were to have a son and two daughters.

== Early career ==
Johnstone began singing professionally in Nashville in 1940 on radio and with the dance orchestras of Beasley Smith and Francis Craig. In 1943 he went to New York City where the following year he was signed by Paul Whiteman for his Philco Hall of Fame radio broadcast on NBC's Blue Network (later ABC).

== Post-war career ==
After service in the United States Merchant Marine in the last 18 months of World War II, he resumed his singing career (changing his name to Johnstone). In 1946 he rejoined the Whiteman orchestra for an all-Gershwin tour, along with singer Mindy Carson and pianist Earl Wild. In 1946-7, Johnstone sang with the orchestras of Larry Clinton and Harry Soznick, and played an extended engagement at the Copacabana night club as featured singer for headliners such as Frank Sinatra. In 1947-8 he was the male vocalist with Shep Fields' "Rippling Rhythm" orchestra, joined by singer Toni Arden. He made a number of recordings in those years on the Decca and Musicraft labels. Johnstone left Shep Fields' orchestra in Los Angeles in the summer of 1948 and, for family reasons, returned to Nashville. He continued to sing in the 1950s–60s on WSM radio and television on their "Waking Crew" morning broadcasts and the televised "Noon Show". He also was the male vocalist with the dance orchestra of Owen Bradley. He began a second career as a commercial artist. From 1970 to 1990 he was the Vice President and Artistic Director for the National Poster Company in Chattanooga, retiring back to Nashville in 1990.
