= 1937 in country music =

This is a list of notable events in country music that took place in the year 1937.

== Events ==
- sales rebounded to approximately 1/3 of 1929 levels
- October 30 – Johnnie Wright and Kitty Wells are married.

== Top Hillbilly (Country) Recordings ==
The following songs were extracted from records included in Joel Whitburn's Pop Memories 1890-1954, record sales reported on the "Discography of American Historical Recordings" website, and other sources as specified. Numerical rankings are approximate, they are only used as a frame of reference.

Rank	Artist	Title	Label	Recorded	Released	Chart Positions
1	Bob Wills and His Texas Playboys	"Steel Guitar Rag"	Vocalion 3394	September 29, 1936	January 22, 1937	US Hillbilly 1937 #1
2	Roy Acuff with The Crazy Tennesseans	"Great Speckled Bird"	Melotone 70159	October 20, 1936	January 1937	US BB 1938 #236, US #13 for 1 week, 3 total weeks, US Hillbilly 1937 #2
3	Jimmie Davis	"Nobody's Darling but Mine"	Decca 5090	September 21, 1934	January 1937	US BB 1937 #340, US #19 for 1 week, 1 total weeks, US Hillbilly 1937 #3
4	Delmore Brothers	"Singing My Troubles Away"	Bluebird 7129	August 3, 1937	September 1937	US Hillbilly 1937 #4
5	Al Dexter	"Honky Tonk Blues"	Melotone 70365	November 28, 1936	March 1937	US Hillbilly 1937 #5
6	Rex Griffin	"The Last Letter"	Decca 5383	May 13, 1937	June 1937	US Hillbilly 1937 #6
7	Gene Autry	"The One Rose (That's Left In My Heart)"	Melotone 71058	May 29, 1937	October 1937	US Hillbilly 1937 #7
8	Jimmie Rodgers And The Carter Family	"The Carter Family And Jimmie Rodgers In Texas"	Bluebird 6762	June 12, 1931	January 20, 1937	US Hillbilly 1937 #8
9	Jimmie Revard And His Oklahoma Playboys	"My Little Girl I Love You"	Bluebird 6877	February 26, 1937	March 1937	US Hillbilly 1937 #9
10	Hoosier Hot Shots	"Breezin' Along with the Breeze"	Vocalion 3644	January 20, 1937	September 1937	US BB 1937 #227, US #13 for 1 week, 2 total weeks, US Hillbilly 1937 #10
11	Bob Skyles & His Skyrockets	"The Arkansas Bazooka Swing"	Bluebird 6876	February 25, 1937	March 1937	US BB 1937 #350, US #19 for 1 week, 1 total weeks, US Hillbilly 1937 #11
12	Sweet Violet Boys	"I Haven't Got a Pot to Cook In"	Vocalion 3402	October 13, 1936	January 1937	US BB 1937 #264, US #15 for 1 week, 2 total weeks, US Hillbilly 1937 #12
13	Bob Wills and His Texas Playboys	"What's the Matter With the Mill"	Vocalion 3424	September 29, 1936	January 1937	US Hillbilly 1937 #13
14	Riverside Ramblers	"Wondering"	Bluebird 6926	February 22, 1937	April 1937	US Hillbilly 1937 #14
15	Roy Acuff and his Crazy Tennesseans	"Steel Guitar Chimes"	Melotone 70752	March 22, 1937	July 1937	US Hillbilly 1937 #15
16	Carson Robison	"There's A Bridle Hangin' on the Wall"	Montgomery Ward 4917	June 19, 1936	February 1937	US Hillbilly 1937 #16
17	Cliff Bruner's Texas Wanderers	"The Right Key (But The Wrong Keyhole)"	Decca 5401	February 5, 1937	July 1937	US Hillbilly 1937 #17
18	Robert Johnson	"Cross Road Blues"	Vocalion 3519	November 27, 1936	February 1937	US Hillbilly 1937 #18
19	Gene Autry and His String Band	"It's Round-Up Time In Reno"	Melotone 71261	October 15, 1937	December 1937	US Hillbilly 1937 #19
20	Bob Wills and His Texas Playboys	"Right Or Wrong"	Vocalion 3451	September 30, 1936	February 1937	US Hillbilly 1937 #20
21	The Prairie Ramblers With Patsy Montana	"I'm A Wild And Reckless Cowboy (From The West Side Of Town)"	Melotone 70469	January 26, 1937	April 1937	US Hillbilly 1937 #21

== Births ==
- March 20 – Jerry Reed, "swamp rock"-styled singer and guitarist best known for novelty hits, most notably "When You're Hot, You're Hot" (died 2008).
- April 6 – Merle Haggard, innovator of the Bakersfield Sound and a huge country star since the 1960s (died 2016).
- June 15 – Waylon Jennings, influential rock-styled country performer and originator of the 1970s "outlaw" movement (died 2002).
- August 26 – Don Bowman, musician, songwriter and comedian, original host of radio's American Country Countdown (died 2013).
- November 1 – Bill Anderson, prolific singer-songwriter and television personality whose success has lasted more than 50 years; known as "Whisperin' Bill."
- November 30 – Jimmy Bowen, prominent record producer and executive from the 1970s through 1990s.
- December 16 – Jim Glaser, singer-songwriter and member of Tompall & the Glaser Brothers (died 2019).
- December 26 – Ronnie Prophet, Canadian country music singer (died 2018).
