= Blind Uncle Gaspard =

Alcide "Blind Uncle" Gaspard
- Also known as: Oncle Gaspard Aveugles
- Born: Alcide Gaspard; 18 October 1878; Dupont, in Avoyelles Parish, Louisiana
- Origin: USA
- Died: 6 October 1937 (aged 58) Plaucheville, in Avoyelles Parish, Louisiana
- Genre: Cajun
- Instrument: Guitar
- Labels: Vocalion, Yazoo

Alcide "Blind Uncle" Gaspard was a partially blind vocalist and guitarist from Louisiana who alternated between string-band music (in a band with his brothers) and traditional Cajun balladry on his recordings for Vocalion. Born in Avoyelles Parish, Louisiana in 1878 of Acadian descent, he became partially blinded when he was seven. It is unknown how Gaspard became blinded in one eye.

== Early life and career ==
Very little is known about Gaspard and his life as a musician; even among big-time Cajun musicians and fans. A brilliant, dexterous guitarist and songwriter, he is often regarded in Cajun and Americana music circles as a very mysterious and unacclaimed figure. His influences remain unknown, although his family is believed to have brought him into music. Gaspard formed his first band with his brothers Victor and Amade. When he began recording in the late 1920s it was mainly as a backing guitarist for fiddler Delma Lachney (1896) of French-Canadian descent. It was then that he also recorded some solo selections of his own during these sessions. None of Gaspard's original recordings are believed to have sold over 100 copies within his lifetime.

Many of Gaspard's rare recordings were re-released on Cajun compilations into the millennium. He has since recently retained a small cult-following. One of Gaspard's select songs "Sur Le Borde De L'eau" was recently featured on the 2014 soundtrack of the HBO television series True Detective, bringing Gaspard's musical endeavors into the mainstream public for the first time. Music journalist Amanda Petrusich discusses the song in her book about collecting 78 rpm records, Do Not Sell At Any Price. The song was among those featured in a 2015 interview with Petrusich on the NPR program, Fresh Air. Interest in Gaspard and his unsung music career have grown in significant popularity since the recent rediscovery of his music.

La Danseuse Listen (MP3)
Marksville Blues Listen (MP3)

== Later life and death ==
Gaspard suffered from deep depression and isolation throughout his life, and it is believed he remained a bachelor until his untimely death. Gaspard reportedly died untimely and alone in 1937. He was believed to be in good-health during the time of his premature passing. His sudden cause of death remains unknown. Gaspard is buried at Mater Dolorosa Catholic Cemetery, in Plaucheville, Avoyelles Parish, Louisiana.

== Discography ==
=== Compilations ===
- Blind Uncle Gaspard, Delma Lachney & John Bertrand: Early American Cajun Music Classic Recordings From the 1920s (2042 Yazoo, 1999)
- Let Me Play This For You : Rare Cajun Recordings (TSQ 2912 Tompkins Square, 2013)
- Blind Uncle Gaspard, Delma Lachney: On the Waters Edge (MRP 069LP Mississippi Records, July 2014)
