= Johnny Burke (lyricist) =

American lyricist (1908–1964)

- Burke, c. 1960

Background information
- Born: John Francis Burke; October 3, 1908; Antioch, California, U.S.
- Origin: Antioch, California, U.S.
- Died: February 25, 1964 (aged 55) New York City, New York, U.S.
- Genres: Popular music
- Occupation: Lyricist
- Years active: 1926–1964
- Label: Paramount Pictures

John Francis Burke (October 3, 1908 – February 25, 1964) was an American lyricist, successful and prolific between the 1920s and 1950s. His work is considered part of the Great American Songbook.

His song "Swinging on a Star", from the Bing Crosby film Going My Way, won an Academy Award for Best Song in 1944.

== Early life ==
Burke was born in Antioch, California, United States, the son of Mary Agnes (née Mungovan), a schoolteacher, and William Earl Burke, a structural engineer. When he was still young, his family moved to Chicago, Illinois, where Burke's father founded a construction business. As a youth, Burke studied piano and drama. He attended Crane College and then the University of Wisconsin–Madison, where he played piano in the orchestra.

After graduating from the University of Wisconsin–Madison in 1927, Burke joined the Chicago office of the Irving Berlin Publishing Company in 1926 as a pianist and song salesman. He also played piano in dance bands and vaudeville.

== Career ==
=== Burke and Spina ===
Irving Berlin Publishing transferred Burke to its New York City office, where he began to write lyrics in collaboration with composer Harold Spina. In 1932, they wrote "Shadows on the Swanee", followed in 1933 by "Annie Doesn't Live Here Anymore", their first big hit for the Guy Lombardo Orchestra. In 1934, Burke and Spina wrote "You're Not the Only Oyster in the Stew", which was a novelty hit for Fats Waller, as was "My Very Good Friend, the Milkman". Burke and Spina wrote many songs that were played by leading bands of the day, including those led by Ben Pollack, Paul Whiteman and Ozzie Nelson. The Burke – Spina partnership ended in 1936 when Burke left for Hollywood.

=== Burke in Hollywood ===
Burke's first partner in Hollywood was Arthur Johnston. He then worked with Jimmy Monaco, but he was to make his mark in collaboration with Jimmy Van Heusen. The team of Burke and Van Heusen turned out some of the great hit tunes of the 1940s. Burke signed a contract with Paramount in 1939, and spent his entire career with the same studio. Burke's primary function as a lyricist was working on the films of Bing Crosby. Of the 41 films on which he worked, 25 starred Crosby. Seventeen songs were substantial hits, including "Pennies from Heaven", "I've Got a Pocketful of Dreams", "Only Forever", "Moonlight Becomes You" and "Sunday, Monday, or Always".

Another Burke-Van Heusen song that Crosby recorded was "Sunshine Cake", which Crosby also sang with Clarence Muse and Coleen Gray in Frank Capra's 1950 Paramount film Riding High. The song was also recorded by Peggy Lee, Jo Stafford and Dick Haymes, and later Tiny Tim. Other Burke-Van Heusen songs Crosby performed in Riding High included "A Sure Thing", "Someplace on Anywhere Road", and "The Horse Told Me".

== Other works ==
In 1939, Burke wrote the lyrics for "Scatterbrain", with music by Frankie Masters and "What's New?" with Bob Haggart. In 1955, Burke added lyrics to a standard by jazz pianist Erroll Garner entitled "Misty". Burke also wrote the words and music to the Nat King Cole song "If Love Ain't There".

The film The Vagabond King (1956) was Burke's last Hollywood work. In 1961, Burke both composed the music and wrote the lyrics for the Broadway musical Donnybrook!, which was based on the 1952 film The Quiet Man. The show opened May 18, ran for 68 performances (plus two previews), and closed on July 15.

== Awards and honors ==
Burke and Van Heusen's song "Swinging on a Star", from the Bing Crosby film Going My Way, won an Academy Award for Best Song in 1944, one of seven Academy Awards won by the film. Burke was posthumously inducted into the Songwriters Hall of Fame in 1970.

In 1995, Burke's life was depicted in the Broadway musical revue, "Swinging on a Star".

== Personal life ==
Burke was married four times. He was married to Mary Mason in the 1960s, who played Liesl in The Sound of Music on Broadway. He was married to Bess Patterson from 1939 to 1955; the marriage produced three children.

== Death ==
In February 1964, Burke died in New York City from a heart attack at the age of 55.

== Discography ==
Among the landmarks of Burke's songwriting career were:

- with Harold Spina:
  - "Annie Doesn't Live Here Anymore"
  - "You're Not the Only Oyster in the Stew"
  - "My Very Good Friend, the Milkman"
  - "Shadows on the Swanee"
  - "The Beat of My Heart"
  - "Now You've Got Me Doing It"
  - "I've Got a Warm Spot in My Heart for You"
- with Arthur Johnston:
  - "Pennies from Heaven"
  - "One Two, Button Your Shoe"
  - "Double or Nothing"
  - "The Moon Got in My Eyes"
  - "All You Want to Do Is Dance"
- with Jimmy Monaco:
  - "Only Forever"
  - "I've Got a Pocketful of Dreams"
  - "Don't Let That Moon Get Away"
  - "An Apple for the Teacher"
  - "On the Sentimental Side"
  - "My Heart Is Taking Lessons"
  - "Scatterbrain"
  - "That Sly Old Gentleman from Featherbed Lane"
  - "Sing a Song of Sunbeams"
  - "East Side of Heaven"
  - "Too Romantic"
  - "Sweet Potato Piper"
  - "Where the Turf Meets the Surf" (with Bing Crosby)
- with Jimmy Van Heusen:
  - "Polka Dots and Moonbeams"
  - "Imagination"
  - "Moonlight Becomes You"
  - "Sunday, Monday, or Always"
  - "Going My Way"
  - "Swinging on a Star"
  - "It Could Happen to You"
  - "And His Rockin' Horse Ran Away"
  - "The First One Hundred Years"
  - "But Beautiful"
  - "Apalachicola, Fla"
  - "Here's That Rainy Day" (from the Broadway musical Carnival in Flanders)
  - "It's an Old Spanish Custom" (from Carnival In Flanders)
  - "Oh, You Crazy Moon"
  - "To See You Is to Love You"
  - "Suddenly It's Spring"
  - "Like Someone in Love"
  - "(We're Off on the) Road to Morocco"
  - "You May Not Love Me"
  - "It's Always You"
  - "A Friend Of Yours"
  - "Personality"
  - "Life Is So Peculiar"
- With Bob Haggart
  - "What's New?"
