= My Song Goes Forth =

- Directed by: Joseph Best
- Produced by: Joseph Best
- Starring: Paul Robeson (narrator)
- Release date: 1937
- Running time: 33 minutes
- Country: United Kingdom

My Song Goes Forth (also known as Africa Sings, Africa Looks Up, U.K., 1937), is the first documentary about South Africa as apartheid was being imposed. The film features singer, actor and civil rights activist Paul Robeson singing the title song and adding a prologue that asks the viewers to interpret the remainder of the film against the producer's intentions. Alternately entitled "Africa Sings", the initial purpose of the film was as a pro-white supremacy short-subject documentary which serves as an advertisement for the birth of apartheid in South Africa but with a conflicting message in the voice-over. Primarily the documentary has been associated with Robeson and early Anti-Apartheid activism due to his re-editing and rewriting of the films' narration.

== Synopsis ==
The advance publicity booklet on the film when it was entitled "Africa Sings", touted it as showing "what the white man achieved for himself" and "what he has done for he natives." "Africa Sings" was one of the first documentary films from South Africa to take a look at the lives of South Africans of all races. There are images of location life, schools and colleges, and a cross-section of occupations, from mine-workers to road-gangs, school-teachers to house- servants, waiters to cane-cutters. Mainstream reviewers gave the documentary a tepid response; the London Daily Worker thought it was too bland to serve a staunch liberationist purpose.

== Paul Robeson's rewritten narration and singing ==
Hired by the director Joseph Best, Robeson worked carefully to revise the film's prologue and in the final version says,

"Every foot of Africa is now parceled out among the white races. Why has this happened? What has prompted them go there? If you listen to men like Mussolini they will tell you it is to 'civilize' – a divine task, entrusted to the enlightened peoples to carry the torch of light and learning, and to benefit the African people... Africa was opened up by the white man for the benefit of himself – to obtain the wealth it contained." "Despite the then radical narration, Best was unable to find an audience for the film, so he reedited the content, carefully not showing poor whites along some of the more prosperous black townships that had been featured in the first cut. He did keep Robeson's narration but removed parts of it to seem less controversial and more mainstream."

Robeson also sings a pro-African liberation song,

"From African jungle, kraal and hut
Where shadows fall on torrid light
My song goes forth and supplicates
In quest of love and right
I seek that star which far or near
Shows all mankind a pathway clear
To do unto his brother
And banish hate and fear"

== Cast ==
- Paul Robeson – Narration
