= This Year's Kisses =

Single by Benny Goodman and His Orchestra

from the album On the Avenue
- B-side: "He Ain't Got Rhythm"
- Released: January 20, 1937
- Genre: show tune
- Length: 2:24
- Label: Victor
- Songwriter: Irving Berlin

"This Year's Kisses" is a popular song written in 1936 by Irving Berlin for the musical film On the Avenue (1937) and introduced by Alice Faye. Popular recordings in 1937 were by Benny Goodman, Hal Kemp, Shep Fields and by Teddy Wilson with Billie Holiday.

== Billie Holiday recording ==
Billie Holiday recorded the song on January 25, 1937, accompanied by Teddy Wilson & His Orchestra (Brunswick 7824), an historic session that marked her first collaboration with tenor saxophonist Lester Young. Benny Goodman (clarinet) also performed on the recording, along with several members of the Count Basie Orchestra, including Buck Clayton on trumpet, Freddie Green on guitar, Walter Page on double bass, and Jo Jones on drums. Jazz critic Gary Giddins, writes that the song "inaugurated the uncanny bond between Billie and Lester Young, whose tenor saxophone--borrowed from Hammond's favorite orchestra, the Basie band--invariably complements, echoes, spurs, and inspires her in one of the most gratifying, unusual, and far too brief musical collaborations of the past century."

== Other recorded versions ==
- Benny Goodman & His Orchestra (vocal by Margaret McCrae) recorded the song on December 30, 1936 (Victor 25505).
- Shep Fields and His Rippling Rhythm Orchestra recorded the song on December 28, 1936, for Bluebird Records (no. 6757).
- Hal Kemp & His Orchestra (1937)
- Hildegarde w/ Carroll Gibbons and His Boy Friends (1937)
- Lester Young recorded the song again on January 12, 1956, with several musicians from the original 1937 Holiday session, including Teddy Wilson, Freddie Green and Jo Jones, for the album The Jazz Giants '56 on Verve Records.
- June Christy – The Misty Miss Christy (1956)
- Ella Fitzgerald – Clap Hands, Here Comes Charlie! (1961)
- Nina Simone – Let It All Out (1966)
