= With a Smile and a Song (song) =

1937 song from Disney's Snow White

Single by Adriana Caselotti

from the album Snow White and the Seven Dwarfs
- B-side: "Dig-A-Dig-Dig" and "Heigh Ho"
- Published: December 21, 1937
- Released: 1938
- Genre: Traditional pop
- Length: 2:02
- Label: Victor
- Songwriters: Frank Churchill; Larry Morey; Leigh Harline

"With a Smile and a Song" is a traditional pop song. The music was written by Frank Churchill, the lyrics by Larry Morey. The song was published in 1937. Credit is also sometimes given to Leigh Harline. The song was sung by Adriana Caselotti in the Walt Disney animated film Snow White and the Seven Dwarfs. It also featured in the stage adaptation from the film.

External audio
- You may hear "With a Smile and a Song" sung by Adriana Caselotti in 1937; Here on uscb.edu
- You may hear "With a Smile and a Song" performed by the Shep Fields' Rippling Rhythm Jazz Orchestra and John Serry; Here on Archive.org

On December 9, 1937, Shep Fields collaborated with the jazz accordionist John Serry Sr. in a recording of the song for Regal Records that had a novelty, march tempo rhythm and featured Bob Goday on vocals.

Teddy Wilson recorded the song as a relaxed, mid-temp shuffle for Brunswick on December 17, 1937 with Pee Wee Russell, clarinet; Hot Lips Page, trumpet; Sally Gooding, vocal; Chu Berry, tenor sax and Alan Reuss, guitar. They recorded two alternate takes that day, one with Reuss soloing.

Doris Day recorded the song with a children's choir for her 1964 album of the same name, With a Smile and a Song. A spoof of the song was used in Shrek the Third.

Snow White (played by Ginnifer Goodwin) hums the song while sweeping the dwarfs' house in the episode "Heart of Darkness" of Once Upon a Time.
