= That Old Feeling (song) =

Song
- Published: 1937 by Leo Feist, Inc.
- Songwriter: Lew Brown
- Composer: Sammy Fain

"That Old Feeling" is a popular song about nostalgia written by Sammy Fain, with lyrics by Lew Brown. It was published in 1937.

The song first appeared in the movie Walter Wanger's Vogues of 1938, which was actually released in 1937. Sung there by Virginia Verrill, it was nominated for the Academy Award for Best Original Song in 1937 but lost out to "Sweet Leilani".

The song was immediately a hit in a version recorded by Shep Fields and His Rippling Rhythm Orchestra, considered to have spent fourteen weeks on the charts in 1937, four at #1. (The charts did not actually exist in those days, but reconstructions of what they would have been give those statistics.) A version was also recorded by Jan Garber, which charted at #10.)

In 1952, it was included in the Susan Hayward movie, With a Song in My Heart where Jane Froman sang it in a dubbing for Hayward. Patti Page, as well as Frankie Laine and Buck Clayton, had hit versions of the song in 1955.

Betty Hutton sang it in Spring Reunion (1956). Frank Sinatra had a hit with the song in 1960 from the album Nice 'n' Easy.

The song is also featured in the 1981 film, Body Heat, played at an outdoor summer concert by a big band on stage.

In the 1971 novel Summer of '42 by Herman Raucher, the song is prominent in chapter 19. That's when the main character, Hermie, visits Dorothy shortly after she has received the news of her husband's death in World War II. The song clearly was the favorite of Dorothy and her husband, and she dances with Hermie as the phonograph record plays.

The title of the song was given to a film in 1997, starring Bette Midler and Dennis Farina, where it was performed by Patrick Williams and by Louis Armstrong and Oscar Peterson.

== Recorded versions ==
External audio
- You may hear the song "That Old Feeling" performed by the Shep Fields Rippling Rhythm Orchestra in 1937; Here on Archive.org

- George Adams
- Ray Anthony
- Louis Armstrong
- Randy Bachman
- Chet Baker
- Dan Barnett
- Count Basie
- Tex Beneke
- Brook Benton
- Art Blakey and the Jazz Messengers
- Connee Boswell
- Elkie Brooks
- Dave Brubeck
- Rosemary Clooney
- Ray Conniff
- Chick Corea
- Dorothy Dandridge
- Doris Day
- Buddy DeFranco
- Paul Desmond
- Dreamland Faces
- Bob Dylan (2017 Triplicate)
- Billy Eckstine
- Sammy Fain
- Gracie Fields
- Shep Fields
- Eddie Fisher with Hugo Winterhalter and his orchestra. Recorded at Manhattan Center, New York City, on July 1, 1952. It was released by RCA Victor Records as catalog number 20-4842A (in USA) and by EMI on the His Master's Voice label as catalog number B 10638
- Ella Fitzgerald on her Decca album "For Sentimental Reasons"
- The Four Lads
- Jane Froman
- Judy Garland
- Erroll Garner
- Stan Getz
- Buddy Greco
- Adelaide Hall
- Woody Herman
- Al Hirt
- Alberta Hunter
- Leslie Hutchinson
- Frank Ifield
- Harry James
- Joni James
- Kitty Kallen
- Stan Kenton
- Teddi King
- King's Singers
- Diana Krall
- Cleo Laine
- Frankie Laine
- Mina
- Dorothy Lamour
- Steve Lawrence
- Peggy Lee
- Guy Lombardo and his Royal Canadians
- Julie London - London by Night (1958)
- Joe Loss and his band
- Vera Lynn
- Ethel Merman
- James Morrison (instrumental only)
- Anita O'Day
- Patti Page
- Emma Pask
- Les Paul and Mary Ford
- The Platters
- Martha Raye
- Della Reese
- Joan Regan
- Harry Roy
- Lita Roza
- Linda Scott
- Artie Shaw
- Dinah Shore
- Frank Sinatra - Nice 'n' Easy (1960)
- Rod Stewart
- Maxine Sullivan
- Art Tatum
- Claude Thornhill
- Vince Jones
- Tiny Tim on his 1996 album Girl, his last album
- Mel Tormé
- Miyoshi Umeki
- Fats Waller
- Dinah Washington
- Magni Wentzel with Einar Iversen, trumpet, Endre Iversen, piano, Tor Braun, guitar, Erik Amundsen, bass. Recorded on May 2, 1960. Released on the single Odeon ND 7373.
- Andy Williams
- Nancy Wilson
- Bryan Larez, venezuelan singer.
