= It Looks Like Rain in Cherry Blossom Lane =

"It Looks Like Rain in Cherry Blossom Lane" is a popular song written by American composer Joe Burke and lyricist Edgar Leslie. It was published in 1937.

It was first recorded by Arthur Tracy, "The Street Singer". In July 1937, the recording of the song by Guy Lombardo, with vocals by his brother, Lebert Lombardo, reached number 1 on the Billboard Best Seller chart, and another version, by Shep Fields, reached number 6. The song was also recorded by Lennie Hayton (1937), Gracie Fields (1937), Joe Loss (1937), the London Piano Accordeon Band (1937), The Lennon Sisters (1957), Debbie Reynolds (1960) and Dolly Dawn (1978), among others.

Maurice Winnick's rendition of the song was sampled by The Caretaker in Under a warm golden light from We'll All Go Riding on a Rainbow and B1 - All that follows is true in Everywhere at the End of Time. B1 - All that follows is true was also featured in the 2026 film Backrooms.
