= Shep Fields =

American jazz bandleader (1910–1981)

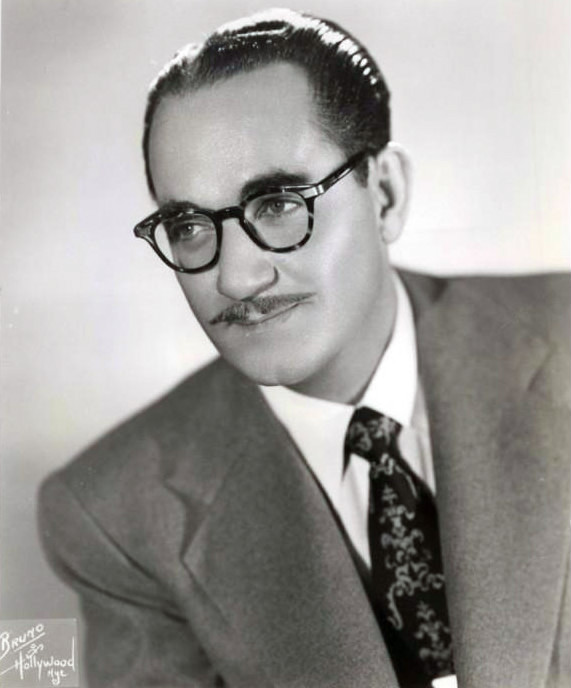
- Shep Fields in 1957

Background information
- Born: Saul Feldman; September 12, 1910; Brooklyn, New York, U.S.
- Died: February 23, 1981 (aged 70) Los Angeles, California
- Genres: Jazz, swing
- Occupation: Bandleader
- Labels: Bluebird, MGM, RCA Victor

Shep Fields (born Saul Feldman, September 12, 1910 – February 23, 1981) was an American bandleader who led the Shep Fields and His Rippling Rhythm orchestra during the 1930s. His distinctive Rippling Rhythm sound was featured on big band remote broadcasts from historic hotels nationwide and remained popular with audiences from the 1930s into the early 1960s.

== Biography ==
=== Early life ===
Shep Fields was born Saul Feldman in Brooklyn, New York, on September 12, 1910, and his mother's maiden name was Sowalski. His brother, Edward Fields, was a carpet manufacturer, and his younger brother, Freddie Fields, was a respected theatrical agent and film producer who helped to establish Creative Management Associates in 1960. Their father died at 39.

Fields began his musical career by playing clarinet and tenor saxophone in bands during college. His "Shep Fields Jazz Orchestra" made frequent appearances at his father's resort hotel, the Queen Mountain House in the Catskill Mountains, which featured such noted singers as Al Jolson and Eddie Cantor. Following the death of his father, Fields was forced to become his family's principal provider. Consequently, he abandoned his studies at law school and reformed his orchestra. Appearances on cruise ships and resort hotels soon followed.

=== Career ===
==== Hotels and radio ====
In 1931, Fields received his first big break when his orchestra was booked at the famed Roseland Ballroom in New York City. By 1933, he also led a band that played at Grossinger's Catskill Resort Hotel. In 1934, he replaced the Jack Denny Orchestra at the landmark Hotel Pierre in New York City. He soon left the Hotel Pierre to join a roadshow with the dancers Veloz and Yolanda. In 1936, he was booked at Chicago's Palmer House Hotel, and the concert was broadcast live on the radio. By 1937, Fields was also featured on the NBC radio network in his own show Rippling Rhythm Revue. His highly successful "Rippling Rhythm" society dance band was subsequently featured regularly on the hotel's big band remote concerts, which were transmitted over the radio to audiences throughout the country.

==== Rippling rhythm sound ====
Fields was eager to perfect a unique orchestral sound to distinguish his ensemble from other sweet jazz bands of his era. With this in mind, he collaborated with his arrangers Sal Gioa and Lou Halmy to analyze the performances of his peers. After admiring the glissandos featured by the trombone in Wayne King's orchestra, Fields adapted them to his viola section. The embellishments for the right hand, which were popularized by Eddy Duchin on the piano, became the source of inspiration for the elegant passages to which Fields assigned to his accordionist. Fields was also impressed by Hal Kemp's use of triplets on the trumpet and Ted Fio Rito's distinctive use of temple blocks. With this in mind, he incorporated the use of triplets by the clarinets, flutes, and temple blocks in his orchestra. After taking note of Ferde Grofe's innovative use of both the trombone and temple blocks in his Grand Canyon Suite, he adopted a similar stylistic device for muted trumpets. The resulting sound impressed radio listeners on the Mutual Radio Network. A contest was soon held in Chicago for fans to suggest a new name for the Fields band, in keeping with the new sound. The word "rippling" was suggested in more than one entry, and Fields came up with "Rippling Rhythm."

Shep Fields soon attracted national attention, and he was subsequently invited to entertain audiences with Veloz and Yolanda at the Cocoanut Grove nightclub at the Ambassador Hotel in Los Angeles. Confident in his success, Fields withdrew from his association with Veloz, Yolanda, and MCA Inc. He decided, instead, to return east to his former position at the Hotel Pierre in New York City. During this return trip to New York, Fields stumbled upon the distinctive sound effect that would serve as the introduction to his "Rippling Rhythm" sound for years to come.

While relaxing between shows during a performance in Rockford, Illinois, Fields was seated at a soda fountain with his wife Evelyn. His attempts to develop a studio sound effect to introduce his music in Los Angeles had not been entirely successful. Struggling to find a solution for her husband, Evy began blowing bubbles into her soda through a straw. Bowing to his wife's inspiration, Fields immediately seized upon the idea and that sound became the trademark which opened each of his shows. In 1937 he recorded his unique theme song for Eli Oberstein on RCA Victor's Bluebird label (Victor BS-017494, 1937)

Fields' light and elegant musical style remained popular among audiences throughout the 1930s and into the 1950s. Based upon his widespread popularity, Fields received a contract with Bluebird Records in 1936. His hits included "Cathedral in the Pines", "Did I Remember?", and "Thanks for the Memory". His performances at Broadway's Paramount Theater consistently broke attendance records. While appearing at the posh "Star-light Roof" atop the Waldorf-Astoria Hotel in 1937, Fields replaced Paul Whiteman with his own radio show, The Rippling Rhythm Revue, which featured a young actor named Bob Hope as the announcer on the NBC network. In 1938, Fields' Rippling Rhythm Orchestra and Hope were featured in his first feature-length motion picture, The Big Broadcast of 1938. A series of live remote broadcasts of the orchestra was also transmitted at this time from the landmark Los Angeles Biltmore Hotel featuring the accordionist John Serry Sr.

As the decade of the 1930s came to a close, Fields remained popular with audiences nationwide. In 1939, he appeared with his orchestra at the Academy Awards ceremony in the historic Biltmore Hotel in Los Angeles, California.

==== New music and USO ====
By 1941, Fields revamped the band into an all-reeds group, with no brass section, known as Shep Fields and His New Music, featuring vocalist Ken Curtis. The orchestra's size was increased dramatically to embellish the results, which Paul Whiteman had recorded. Fields now presented an orchestra that blended over 35 instruments, including: one bass saxophone, one baritone saxophone, six tenor saxophones, four alto saxophones, three bass clarinets, 10 standard clarinets, and nine flutes including an alto flute and a piccolo. Noted singers such as Ralph Young were also engaged. The resulting band produced a rich ensemble sound under the guidance of such arrangers as Glenn Osser, Lew Harris, and Freddy Noble, who also served as the band's musical director. The critic Leonard Feather applauded the new band's beautiful sound, and Shep embarked upon a series of USO tours to entertain the troops during World War II. From February, 1943, to August, 1944, guitarist Joe Negri also worked with the band.

By the mid-1940s Fields' Rippling Rhythm Orchestra had performed at several of New York City's premier landmark hotel venues including: the Biltmore Hotel, the Grill Room in the Roosevelt Hotel and the Waldorf Astoria Hotel . By 1945, his orchestra was also featured in performances at the famed Copacabana nightclub which were broadcast live on the WOR-Mutual radio network.

After World War II ended, Fields reverted to his ever popular "Rippling Rhythm" style in 1947 and continued to perform in hotels long after other bands of his era had disappeared. The group disbanded in 1963, and Fields moved to Houston, Texas, where he worked as a disc jockey. He later worked at Creative Management Associates with his brother Freddie Fields in Los Angeles.

=== Death ===
Shep Fields died on February 23, 1981, at Cedars-Sinai Medical Center in Los Angeles from a heart attack. He was buried in Mount Hebron Cemetery in New York.

=== Legacy ===
During the course of an artistic career, which extended from 1931 through 1963, Shep Fields compiled an extensive musical legacy that has been preserved on such record labels as: Bluebird Records, Mercury Records, MGM, and RCA Victor. His discography includes over three hundred arrangements of popular songs from this era and includes such hits as: "It's De-Lovely" (1937), "I've Got You Under My Skin", "The Jersey Bounce" (1942), "Moonlight and Shadows" (Bluebird 6803), "That Old Feeling" (Bluebird 7066), and "Thanks for the Memory" (Bluebird 7318, 1938). Noted musical arranger and editor Joseph Schillinger observed that over the course of his career, Shep Fields had assembled "one of the most colorful bands" of his time.

== Band ==
External audio
- You may hear the Shep Fields Rippling Rhythm Orchestra performing the fox trot "In the Merry Month of May" with the accordionist John Serry Sr. in 1938 Here on DAHR
- You may hear the Shep Fields Rippling Rhythm Orchestra performing "Whistle While You Work" in 1937 Here on DAHR

- Gene Merlino, vocals 1928
- Sid Greene (1908–2006), drums and percussion, band manager, 1932–1943
- Hal Derwin, vocals 1940
- Larry Neill, vocals 1940
- Dorothy Allen (1896–1970), vocals 1940
- Ken Curtis vocals 1942–1949
- Joe Negri (1926- ), guitar
- The Three Beaus and a Peep, vocals circa 1947–1948
- Bob Johnstone (1916–1994), singer circa 1947–1948
- Toni Arden, singer, circa 1945
- Bob Shapley, accordion, circa 1948–1950
- Carl Frederick Tandberg (1910–1988), bass fiddle, circa 1940
- Lou Halmy (1911–2005), trumpet, music arranger, circa 1935
- Sid Caesar (1922–2014), saxophone, circa 1940
- John Serry Sr. (1915–2003), accordion, 1937–1938.
- Pat Foy, singer 1941
- Lew Harris, music arranger 1940
- Earl Kramer, bass saxophone 1941
- John Quara (1925-), guitar circa 1947–1950
- Thelma Gracen (1950 and 1951)

== Live broadcasts ==
External audio
- You may hear the Shep Fields Rippling Rhythm Orchestra in their Big band remote broadcasts during the 1944 and 1953 years Here on archive.org

- Palmer House Hotel: Empire Room in Chicago during the late 1930s
- Biltmore Hotel in Los Angeles during September 1938 - October 1938 with John Serry Sr. as featured soloist on the NBC radio network
- Copacabana nightclub in New York City during 1945.
- Glen Island Casino in New Rochelle, New York, on May 12, 1947, with Toni Arden, Bob Johnstone, and The Three Beaus and a Peep
- Ice Terrace Room of the New Yorker Hotel on March 6, 1948, with Toni Arden, Bob Johnstone, and The Three Beaus and a Peep

== Discography ==
External audio
- You may hear recordings by Shep Fields and his Rippling Rhythm Orchestra from 1936 - 1944 Here

A partial discography of Shep Fields recordings includes:

- Any Little Girl, That's a Nice Little Girl - Bluebird (B-7606-A) - Song by Fred Fisher played by Shep Fields Rippling Rhythm Orchestra & accordionist John Serry (1938)
- Cathedral In the Pines - Bluebird (B-7553-A) - Song by Charles Kenny played by the Shep Fields Rippling Rhythm Orchestra & accordionist John Serry (1938)
- Easy To Love - Bluebird (B-6592-A) - Song by Cole Porter played by the Shep Fields Rippling Rhythm Orchestra (1936)
- If It Rains Who Cares? - Bluebird ( B-7579-A) - Song performed by the Shep Fields Rippling Rhythm Orchestra with the accordionist John Serry (1938)
- It's De-Lovely - Montgomery Ward (M-7074-A) - Song by Cole Porter performed by the Shep Fields Rippling Rhythm Orchestra (1936)
- In The Merry Month Of May - Bluebird (B-7606-B) - Song by Ed Haley played by the Shep Field Rippling Rhythm Orchestra with the accordionist John Serry (1938)
- I've Got My Love to Keep Me Warm - Bluebird (B-6769-A) - Song by Irving Berlin performed by the Shep Fields Rippling Rhythm Orchestra (1937)
- I've Got You Under My Skin - Bluebird (B-6592-B) - Song by Cole Porter performed by the Shep Fields Rippling Rhythm Orchestra (1936)
- Jersey Bounce - MGM (11552) - Song performed by the Shep Fields Rippling Rhythm Orchestra (1953)
- Let's Call the Whole Thing Off- Bluebird (B-6878-B) - Song by George Gershwin & Ira Gershwin performed by the Shep Fields Rippling Rhythm Orchestra (1937)
- Moonlight and Shadows - Bluebird (B-6803-A) - Song performed by the Shep Fields Rippling Rhythm Orchestra (1937)
- Now It Can Be Told - Bluebird (B-7592-A) - Song by Irving Berlin performed by the Shep Fields Rippling Rhythm Orchestra with the accordionist John Serry (1938)
- Rippling Rhythm - Bluebird (B-6759-A) - Song performed by the Shep Fields Rippling Rhythm Orchestra (1936)
- September in the Rain - Bluebird (B-6805-A) - Song by Harry Warren performed by the Shep Fields Rippling Rhythm Orchestra (1937)
- Thanks For The Memory - Bluebird (B-7318-A) - Song by Ralph Rainger performed by the Shep Fields Rippling Rhythm Orchestra (1937)
- That Old Feeling - Bluebird (B-7066-A)- Song by Sammy Fain performed by the Shep Fields Rippling Rhythm Orchestra (1937)
- This Little Ripple Had Rhythm - Bluebird (B7304-B) - Song performed by the Shep Fields Rippling Rhythm Orchestra (1937)
- Whistle While You Work - Bluebird (B-7343-A) - Song by Frank Churchill & Larry Morey performed by the Shep Fields Rippling Rhythm Orchestra with the accordionist John Serry (1937)
- With A Smile and A Song - Bluebird (B-7343-B) - Song by Frank Churchill & Larry Morey performed by the Shep Fields Rippling Rhythm Orchestra with accordionist John Serry (1937)
- You're Laughing at Me - Bluebird (B-6769-B) - Song by Irving Berlin performed by the Shep Fields Rippling Rhythm Orchestra (1937)

== Filmography ==
- Various Soundies (1941–1946)
- You Came To My Rescue (1937) - director Dave Fleischer
- The Big Broadcast of 1938 (1938) - director Mitchell Leisen with W.C. Fields, Martha Raye, Dorothy Lamour, and Bob Hope
- Kreisler Bandstand (1951) - TV series director Perry Lafferty
- Handle with Care (1977 film) (Citizens Band) - executive producer
