= Frankie Masters =

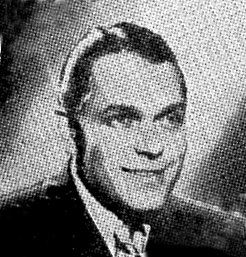
- Frankie Masters in a 1944 advertisement

Background information
- Birth name: Frank E. Masterman
- Born: April 12, 1904 St. Marys, West Virginia, U.S.
- Died: October 28, 1990 (aged 86) Barrington, Illinois, U.S.
- Genres: Big band, easy listening, traditional pop
- Occupation(s): Bandleader, musician
- Instrument(s): Banjo, Guitar, vocals
- Years active: 1920s – 1970s
- Labels: Victor, Vocalion, Okeh, Columbia

Frankie Masters (born Frank E. Masterman; April 12, 1904 – October 28, 1990) was a big band leader. Elected to the American Federation of Musicians, Local 10 in Chicago, on February 13, 1924, Masters's performance career endured through the 1970s.

== Career ==
Born in St. Marys, West Virginia, to Alice (née Evans) and William Masterman, Masters graduated from Robinson High School in southern Illinois. He attended Indiana University Bloomington, where he majored in Commerce and led a band that performed at college dances, playing the banjo. During the summer, he found work as a guitarist with the orchestra on the cruise ship S.S. President Madison as it headed for Asia. When he returned, he joined a big band led by Benny Krueger at the Tivoli Theatre in Chicago. There, they would accompany silent films and be featured as an on-stage band between screenings.

He signed with Victor Records in 1927 and began his recording career, but didn't achieve much success until he switched to Vocalion Records in 1939. There he recorded what would become his theme song, "Scatter-Brain," written by Masters and band members Carl Bean and Kahn Keene, with lyrics by Johnny Burke. It was a number one hit for eight weeks in 1939, becoming the #28 song overall on the pop charts that year. Many of these hits incorporated what Masters called "bell tone music," an arrangement gimmick in which chords were staggered, creating, for the time, a trademark sound.

From the mid-1930s through the remainder of his career, Masters largely led hotel house bands in Chicago and New York City that focused on dinner shows and dancing. Although the bands employed several vocalists, Masters, with a pleasant and melodious voice, provided the vocals on the majority of songs. Notable among his vocalists were Marion Francis (née Marion Francis Charlesworth; 1917–2011) and Phyllis Miles (aka Myles), later to become his wife. On occasion, several band members would be employed as a vocal chorus, billed variously as 'The Swing Masters' or "The Masters Voices."

Frankie Masters and his Orchestra recorded extensively, producing 124 sides on Vocalion, Okeh, and Columbia between 1939 and 1942, During that same time, they cut several hundred songs for World and Lang-Worth transcription services that provided music to radio stations on a subscription basis and were not released for purchase by the general public. It was also during this period that the Music Corporation of America (now MCA Inc.) organized a sponsored radio show for the Masters orchestra. It was broadcast first via WBBM, later WMAQ and was called It Can Be Done. Also featured each week was poet-journalist Edgar Guest. The show, according to saxophonist Buddy Shaw, who played with Masters's band at the time, featured stories about people who achieved success through adversity. Masters and company also made several movie shorts, which were shown in theaters nationally.

He and wife Phyllis Miles hosted the television show Lucky Letters on WBKB. Later that year and into early 1951, they had a weekly program called Walgreen's Open House.

Then in the fall of 1974, when the Empire Room of the Palmer House Hotel reopened for the season, the Frankie Masters Orchestra became the new house band, replacing Ben Arden and his band, which had been appearing there since 1957.
