= On the Avenue =

1937 film by William A. Seiter, Roy Del Ruth

- Theatrical poster
- Directed by: Roy Del Ruth; William J. Scully (assistant); William Seiter (fill-in)
- Written by: Irving Berlin (story); Eddie Cherkose; Samuel Pokrass
- Screenplay by: William M. Conselman; Gene Markey
- Produced by: Gene Markey; Darryl F. Zanuck
- Starring: Dick Powell; Madeleine Carroll; Alice Faye; The Ritz Brothers; George Barbier
- Cinematography: Lucien Andriot
- Edited by: Allen McNeil
- Music by: Charles Maxwell; Cyril J. Mockridge
- Distributed by: Twentieth Century-Fox Film Corporation
- Release date: February 12, 1937
- Running time: 89 minutes
- Country: United States
- Language: English
- Budget: $1 million
- Box office: $1.3 million

On the Avenue is a 1937 American musical film directed by Roy Del Ruth and starring Dick Powell, Madeleine Carroll, Alice Faye, George Barbier, and The Ritz Brothers. Many of the songs were composed by Irving Berlin. Many of the plot details (with a reversal of the male and female roles) were used in Let's Make Love. Initially, the movie was called Out Front.

== Plot ==
Gary Blake stars in a new show, On the Avenue, with Mona Merrick. The show satirizes Mimi Carraway, the richest girl in the world. Mimi and her father are in the opening night audience and feel insulted. When Mimi goes backstage and tries to get Gary to take the skit out of the show, he refuses and calls her a "bad sport".

Shocked by the remark, Mimi decides to make a date with Gary. They spend the entire evening together and fall in love by morning. Gary finally agrees to revise the skit so it can no longer hurt the Carraways. However, Mona is in love with Gary and is furious when she hears about Gary's date with Mimi. When the Carraways appear to see the revised sketch, Mona changes it without Gary's knowledge, making it worse than before. The Carraways decide to file suit against Gary.

To get back at Gary, Mimi buys the show from the producer and embarrasses Gary by hiring a paid audience to walk out on the show. Word leaks out to the press and makes Gary the laughingstock of New York. Furious, he tears up his contract, refusing to work with Mimi. Soon, Mimi becomes engaged to Arctic explorer Frederick Sims. On her wedding day, Mona arrives and tells Mimi that she, not Gary, changed the skit. Mimi runs out of the wedding and goes to city hall with Gary to be married.

The film's action is interspersed with songs from the play, including Berlin's songs "He Ain't Got Rhythm," and "Let's Go Slumming On Park Avenue."

== Cast ==
- Dick Powell as Gary Blake
- Madeleine Carroll as Mimi Caraway
- Alice Faye as Mona Merrick
- The Ritz Brothers as themselves
- George Barbier as Commodore Caraway
- Alan Mowbray as Frederick Sims
- Cora Witherspoon as Aunt Fritz
- Walter Catlett as J.J. Dibble
- Douglas Fowley as Eddie Eads
- Joan Davis as Miss Katz
- Stepin Fetchit as Herman 'Step'
- Sig Ruman as Herr Hanfstangel (as Sig Rumann)
- Billy Gilbert as Joe Papaloupas

== Partial soundtrack ==
- "I've Got My Love to Keep Me Warm" (1937)
  - Music and Lyrics by Irving Berlin
  - Sung by Dick Powell and Alice Faye in the show
- "This Year's Kisses" (1937)
  - Music and Lyrics by Irving Berlin
  - Sung by Alice Faye with piano accompaniment at rehearsal
- "You're Laughing at Me" (1937)
  - Music and Lyrics by Irving Berlin
  - Sung by Dick Powell with the studio orchestra
- "The Girl on the Police Gazette" (1937)
  - Music and Lyrics by Irving Berlin
  - Sung by Dick Powell with a barbershop quartet
- "Cheek to Cheek" (1935)
  - Music and Lyrics by Irving Berlin
  - Partially sung by Harry Ritz in the "He Ain't Got Rhythm" number
- "He Ain't Got Rhythm" (1937)
  - Music and Lyrics by Irving Berlin
  - Performed by Alice Faye, The Ritz Brothers and chorus in the show

== Reception and accolades ==
Writing for Night and Day in 1937, Graham Greene gave the film a good review, noting the film's astute direction and succinctly summarizing it as "a good film with some charming songs". Greene's only significant complaint was that of the performance given by Carroll which Greene described as evoking "the less endearing traits of a young elephant", "her stupendous coquetry", and her "intense proboscine whispers". Speaking for the audience, Greene claims that "we don't want weight or fidelity in a musical comedy".

The film was nominated for the American Film Institute's 2006 list AFI's Greatest Movie Musicals.
