= You're Laughing at Me =

Song
- Published: 1937
- Songwriter: Irving Berlin

"You're Laughing at Me" is a popular song written by Irving Berlin for the 1937 film On the Avenue, where it was introduced by Dick Powell. Popular versions in 1937 were by Fats Waller and by Wayne King.

== Notable recordings ==
- Mildred Bailey recorded the song on January 19, 1937 for Vocalion (No. 3456).
- Ella Fitzgerald - Ella Fitzgerald Sings the Irving Berlin Songbook (1958)
