= Hal Kemp =

American jazz saxophonist, clarinetist and bandleader (1905–1985)

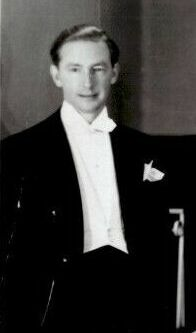

Background information
- Born: James Hal Kemp; March 27, 1904; Marion, Alabama, U.S.
- Died: December 21, 1940 (aged 36) Madera, California, U.S.
- Genres: Jazz, swing music, big band
- Occupations: Bandleader; musician; arranger; composer
- Instruments: Alto saxophone, clarinet
- Years active: 1924–1940

James Hal Kemp (March 27, 1904 – December 21, 1940) was an American jazz alto saxophonist, clarinetist, bandleader, composer, and arranger.

== Biography ==
Hal Kemp was born in Marion, Alabama. He formed his first band in high school, and by the age of 19 led a University of North Carolina band, the Carolina Club Orchestra. They sailed to England, where they made their first recordings in London, and on their return journey made the acquaintance of the Prince of Wales, who performed with them. As a result, the band was mentioned in US press reports, and on their return received several offers of contracts. In 1927, Kemp formed his own orchestra, which at various times featured Skinnay Ennis, Bunny Berigan, and John Scott Trotter, and the band became a popular jazz orchestra in the late 1920s.

In the 1930s, with the economic and social challenges of the Great Depression, Kemp's band became better known for more soothing "sweet" dance music. From 1932 to 1934, they performed at the Blackhawk Restaurant in Chicago, and appeared regularly on radio broadcasts. They became well-known nationally, and secured a contract with Brunswick Records. Most of the vocals on their recordings were by Skinnay Ennis, whose vocal style and the arrangements by Trotter, which featured staccato triplets by the trumpeters and clarinets played through megaphones, gave Kemp's records a distinctive sound.

Kemp and his orchestra had a number of hit records, including "Shuffle Off to Buffalo" (1933), "Midnight, the Stars and You" (1934), "In the Middle of a Kiss" (1935), "There's a Small Hotel" (1936), "When I'm With You" (1936), "This Year's Kisses" (1937), and "Where or When" (1937). From 1937, Kemp recorded for Victor Records. His other recordings included "Got A Date With An Angel", "Heart Of Stone", "Lamplight", "The Music Goes 'Round And Around", "You're The Top", "Bolero", "Gloomy Sunday", "Lullaby Of Broadway", and many others.

In 1936, John Scott Trotter left, being succeeded as arranger by Hal Mooney and Lou Busch. Ennis left in 1938, and Bob Allen became the band's featured singer. With the rising popularity of swing bands such as those of Benny Goodman and Tommy Dorsey, the popularity of Kemp's orchestra declined and there were many changes in band membership, though they continued to make film appearances.

Hal Kemp died in Madera, California in 1940, aged 36, following a road accident while driving from Los Angeles to a performance in San Francisco in foggy conditions. His car was hit by an oncoming truck, and he died in hospital from pneumonia two days later. The orchestra remained operational for some time after Kemp's death, led by singer Art Jarrett, but disbanded in the early 1940s.

== Marriages and Family ==
Hal Kemp was married twice. In 1932 he wed Bessie Slaughter, of Dallas, Texas. They had two children — daughter Sally, and son Hal Jr. The couple were divorced in July, 1938. Kemp married again on January 13, 1939, to New York Society debutante Martha Stephenson, in Pittsburgh. They had one daughter, Helen Stephenson Kemp.
