= Jules Verne Allen =

Musical artist (1883–1945)

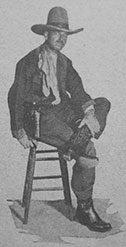
- Jules Verne Allen ca. 1924
- Born: February 7, 1883; Waxahachie, Ellis County, Texas, U.S.
- Died: July 10, 1945 (aged 62); Tucson, Pima County, Arizona, U.S.
- Resting place: Evergreen Memorial Park, Tucson, Arizona
- Other names: The Original Singing Cowboy; Longhorn Luke; Shiftless
- Occupations: Singer-songwriter; musician; author; cowboy
- Musical career
- Genres: Country; Western
- Instruments: Vocals; guitar; banjo
- Years active: 1924–1930

Jules Verne Allen (April 1, 1883 – July 10, 1945) was an American country music singer-songwriter, writer, and cowboy. He was one of the few early singing cowboys who had actually engaged in ranching. Calling himself the "Original Singing Cowboy," Allen's music is considered some of the best examples of authentic traditional cowboy songs. Allen only recorded 24 songs, but his frequent live radio performance and book Cowboy Lore (1933) made him one of the most influential figures in the popularization of country western music.

== Biography ==
=== Early life ===
Allen was born on April 1, 1883, in Waxahachie, Texas, United States. His father, Luther, was a settler from Missouri and seems to have died or abandoned his family when Jules was a child. His mother, Carrie, died ten years later and entrusted Allen with the care of his three younger siblings. According to his book Cowboy Lore, he began working as a hand at his uncle's ranch when he was ten. After his mother's death, he began driving cattle hundreds of mile from the open ranges along the U.S.-Mexico border to railroad stockyards in Montana. During these long journeys, Allen's companions immersed him in a rich oral tradition of cowboy stories and songs, and taught him how to play the guitar.

With end of open-range cattle driving, Allen later claimed that he began performing at local rodeos and on an amateur basis. He also stated that he worked as a deputy sheriff in El Paso County, Texas, then Bernalillo County, New Mexico, Texas, and finally as a Texas Ranger.

However, there is reason to doubt the veracity of his autobiographical claims. For example, military records indicate that he served in the U.S. Army from 1905 to 1907. Additionally, his enlistment records state that he was a "barber" in Denver, Colorado in 1905. Allen also never mentioned the fact that he was previously married to a woman in Sturgis, South Dakota, named Charlotte Evelyn Hough, whom he divorced shortly after the birth of their daughter, Ethal Myrie "Mary" Allen, in 1904. After her parents separated, Mary was placed in a convent as an infant, but her mother remarried and later recovered her.

=== Music career ===
During World War I, Allen enlisted in the U.S. Army during World War I and began performing in blackface as a minstrel. He served as a sergeant in the 64th Infantry Regiment, which was assigned to the 7th Infantry Division operating in Lorraine, France. Prior to deploying to France, Allen married Elizabeth M. Caswell in El Paso on December 14, 1917.

Allen claimed that after the war he briefly returned to ranching, but government census records from 1920 show that was living with his wife in Philadelphia, Pennsylvania, and working as a driver for the short-lived Fox Motor Company. Regardless, he soon left ranching or driving (probably when Fox dissolved in 1923) and began performing as singing cowboy on the radio in Texas under a variety of names including "Longhorn Luke" (after the Longhorn Cement Company, his San Antonio sponsor) and "Shiftless."

The success of fellow singing cowboy Carl T. Sprague's song "When the Work's All Done This Fall" in 1925 opened the door for other singing cowboys like Ken Maynard, Stuart Hamblen, "Red River Dave" McEnery, Tex Ritter, Gene Autry, and Allen. Allen traveled to Los Angeles to take advantage of the growing cowboy music scene in Hollywood, where he was discovered by Ralph Peer, a scout with Victor Records.

In April 1928, he recorded three songs in El Paso with Victor–"Little Joe the Wrangler," "Jack O'Diamonds," and "Po 'Mourner" (a minstrel song). Despite Sprague's earlier recordings, RCA-Victor copyrighted the phrase "The Original Singing Cowboy" for Allen's records. Allen also acted in a few Westerns. From 1928 to 1929, Allen recorded a total of 24 songs with Victor before his records sales began to slip during the Great Depression when more a more contemporary and romanticized style of country western music became popular.

=== Later life ===
Allen, who divorced his second wife sometime in the 1920s, married an unknown woman in 1930 and moved to Taos, New Mexico. In 1929, he reunited with his daughter Mary, who discovered her long-lost father after she heard one of his records playing. Although he had no more record releases, Allen continued to perform on the radio, as well as with rodeo shows and traveling circuses throughout the 1930s.

In 1933, Allen wrote an autobiography about his life as a cowboy, accompanied by a dictionary of cowboy terms and sayings, a glossary of cattle brands, and collection of songs in a book entitled Cowboy Lore. While Allen claimed the book contained knowledge and songs he learned while working on the trail, Barry Shank (an American studies scholar) notes that almost all of his observations about cowboy life, as well as all but three of the songs, are identical to those previously published by singer John Avery Lomax in 1910. Furthermore, two of the songs were written in the 1920s for the records Allen recorded with Victor Records. How much of Allen's autobiography was a result of his personal experiences as a cowboy rather than Lomax's work is unknown.

Allen divorced his third wife sometime prior to 1940 and moved back to Los Angeles. He continued to perform at rodeos and on radio stations throughout the southwest during the final years of his life. While travelling through Tucson, Arizona in 1945, Allen fell ill and was admitted to the local veterans hospital. Doctors diagnosed him with a gastric ulcer and he died a week later. He is buried at the Evergreen Memorial Park cemetery in Tucson, Veterans Block 4, Section C, Grave 247.

== Legacy ==
Although he enjoyed a brief musical career, Allen is considered one of the pioneers of early country music. His cowboy stories and music inspired the next generation of country music singers, including Country Music Hall of Fame member Ernest Tubb. His work also helped popularize western-themed books and films.
