= Singing cowboy =

Archetypal cowboy hero of early Western films

A singing cowboy was a subtype of the archetypal cowboy hero of early Western films. It references real-world campfire side ballads in the American frontier. The original cowboys sang of life on the trail with all the challenges, hardships, and dangers encountered while pushing cattle for miles up the trails and across the prairies. This continues with modern vaquero traditions and within the genre of Western music, and its related New Mexico, Red Dirt, Tejano, and Texas country music styles. A number of songs have been written and made famous by groups like the Sons of the Pioneers and Riders in the Sky and individual performers such as Marty Robbins, Gene Autry, Roy Rogers, Tex Ritter, Bob Baker and other "singing cowboys". Singing in the wrangler style, these entertainers have served to preserve the cowboy as a unique American hero.

== History ==
The image of the singing cowboy was established in 1925 when Carl T. Sprague of Texas recorded the cowboy song, "When the Work's All Done This Fall". A year later, John I. White became the first representative of the genre to perform on a nationally broadcast radio show. Other early recording artists in the Western genre included Jules Verne Allen, Harry McClintock, Wilf Carter alias Montana Slim, and Tex Owens who wrote "The Cattle Call" which became a standard in the singing cowboy genre.

Many of these early recording artists had grown up on ranches and farms or had experience working as cowboys. They typically performed simple arrangements with rustic vocal performances and a simple guitar or fiddle accompaniment. The full popularity of the singing cowboys was not reached until the spread of sound films and the emergence of the commercial country music industry.

As the singing cowboy genre developed it kept its themes of the American west and cowboy life, but moved away from its folk music origins to adapt to popular tastes. It was popularized by many of the B-movies of the 1930s and 1940s. The typical singing cowboys were white-hat-wearing, clean-shaven heroes with the habit of showing their emotions in song. Singing cowboys typically recorded with big band arrangements, often in the western swing style popularized by Bob Wills, and were also influenced by the vocal style of crooners such as Bing Crosby. Crosby himself also made a single appearance as a singing cowboy in Rhythm on the Range (1936), including the song "I'm an Old Cowhand (From the Rio Grande)" which many other singing cowboys later performed.

== Notable actors ==
=== Ken Maynard ===
Ken Maynard was the screen's first singing cowboy. He first appeared in silent motion pictures in 1923 and in addition to acting also did stunt work. His horsemanship and rugged good looks made Maynard a cowboy star. He recorded two songs with Columbia Records before making his first film with a musical soundtrack. He sang two songs in Sons of the Saddle (1930).

=== Bob Steele ===
In 1930 Bob Steele began a series of singing cowboy films for Tiffany Pictures though he later stopped singing in films.

=== John Wayne ===
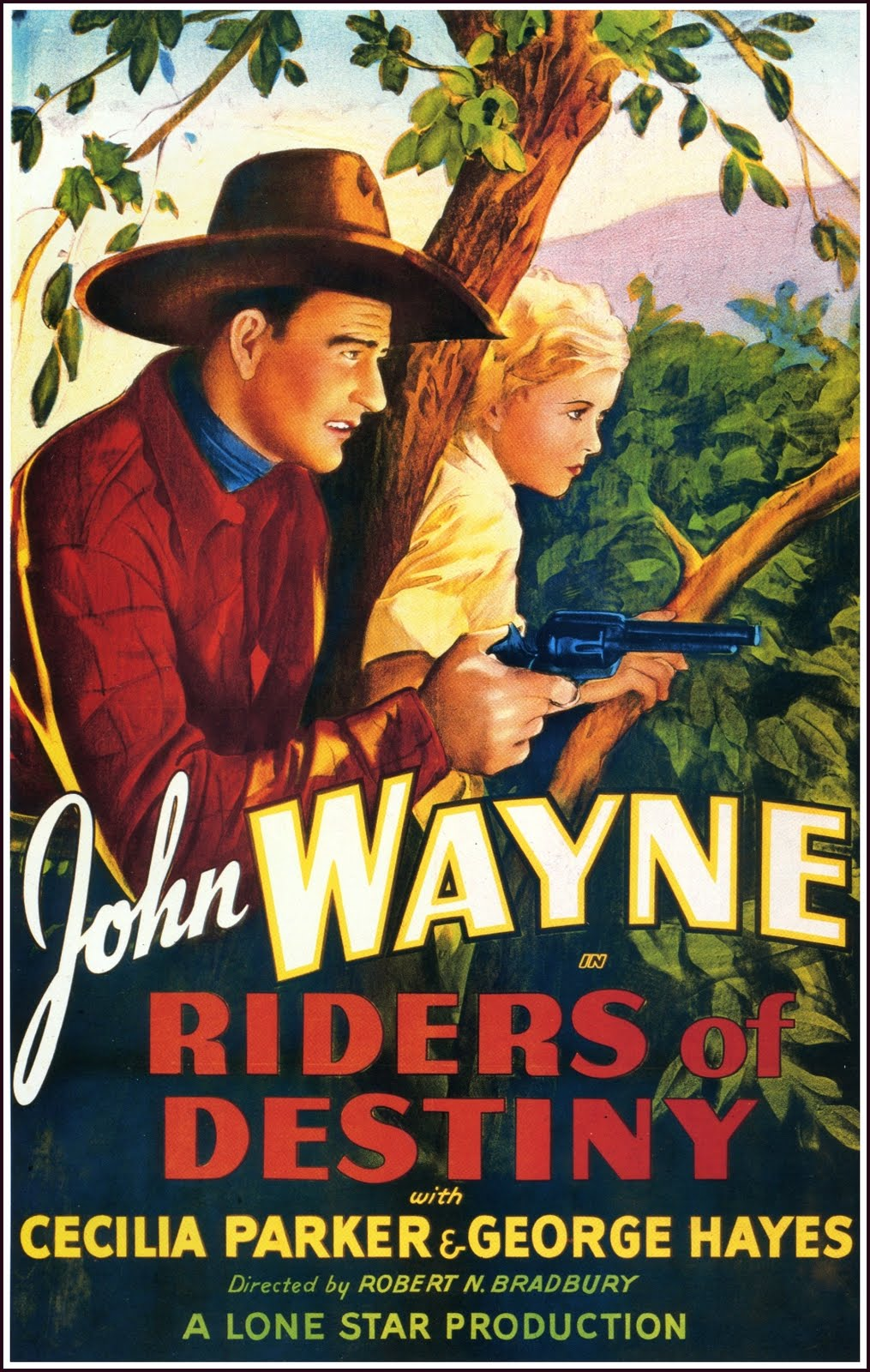

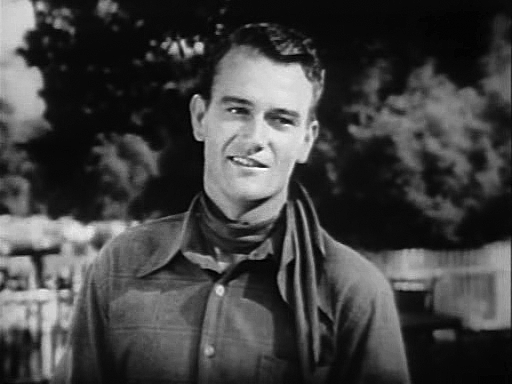
John Wayne as "Singin' Sandy" Saunders in Riders of Destiny

Early in his career, 27-year-old John Wayne appeared as "Singin' Sandy Saunders" in Riders of Destiny (1933) and also made seven more films for Monogram Pictures. Wayne's version of the singing cowboy was much darker than the later ones; his ten-gallon hat was black instead of white and he'd chant about "streets running with blood" and "you'll be drinking your drinks with the dead" as he strode purposefully down the street toward a showdown.

The films were successful and boosted Wayne's career after several failures in the wake of the widescreen classic The Big Trail (1930), but he refused to renew his contract in 1935, although he did continue making nonsinging Westerns for Monogram's successor, Republic Pictures. Because Wayne could not sing, his filmed songs were dubbed by the son of director Robert N. Bradbury, making the obligatory personal appearances a continuous embarrassment for the young actor. Wayne also emphasized authenticity in his Westerns and knew that real cowboys did not routinely sing on the way to a gunfight or wear Singin' Sandy's elaborate costumes.

=== Gene Autry ===
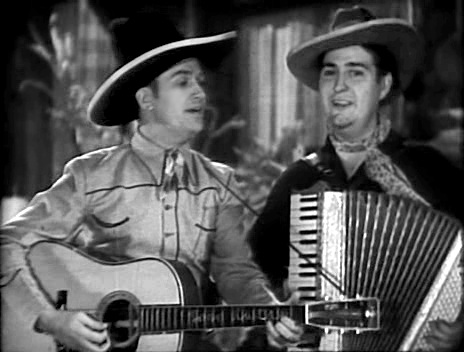
Gene Autry and Smiley Burnette (1934)

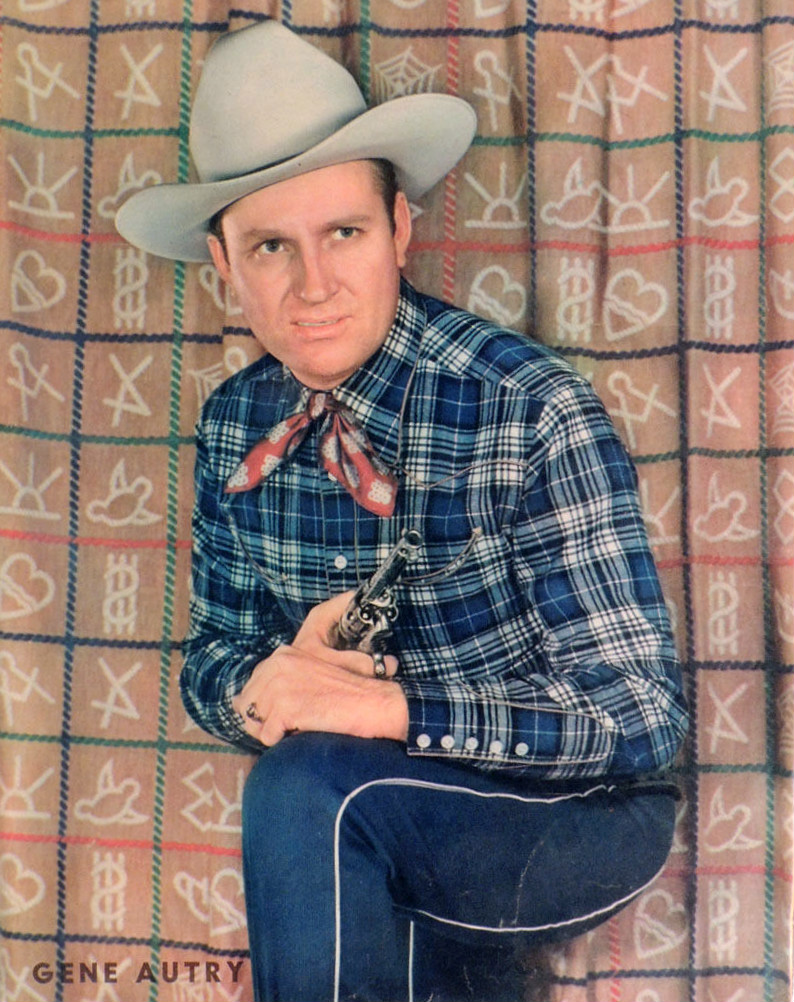
Gene Autry, 1942

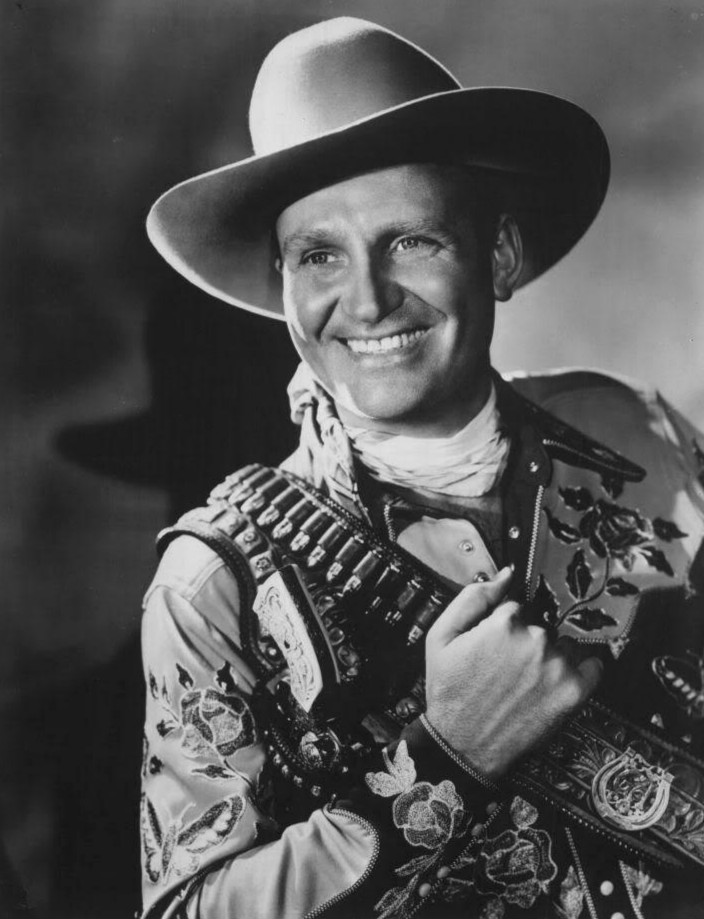
Gene Autry ca. 1950

While other Western actors, such as John Wayne and Clint Eastwood, only dabbled in singing roles, some actors became known mainly for their parts as singing cowboys. The most famous of them was Gene Autry, and the moniker "the singing cowboy" usually refers to him in particular. When Wayne declined further singing cowboy roles, Republic looked for a replacement. Former rodeo rider Autry was chosen because he was the one candidate who could both sing and ride a horse. The choice was so successful that, at the time of his death in 1998, Autry was still on the top 10 list of Hollywood Western box office moneymakers.

Autry, initially a rodeo competitor, first rose to popularity as a singer, but his acting career started off quickly with the 1935 film serial The Phantom Empire, and he became a prolific star. Autry's early popularity, both for his radio and film performances, quickly paved the way for a multitude of imitators, but most attempts didn't get close to his success.

Autry, and later Roy Rogers, often appeared in contemporary Western settings rather than the 19th century wild west era. This allowed the stars to appear in modern clothing alongside motorcars, airplanes, and telephones. In The Phantom Empire, Autry spends time singing on the radio at his "Radio Ranch" as well as battling an ancient civilisation with a race of robots who live beneath the earth.

Autry was also the first sound motion picture cowboy star to use his own name as the main character in a film, a practice soon emulated by Rogers (although "Roy Rogers" wasn't his real name, either, it was Leonard Slye).

=== Dick Foran ===
Warner Bros. began a series of twelve singing cowboy films featuring their contract star Dick Foran from 1935-1937. Foran's first picture in this popular series was Moonlight on the Prairie, followed by Song of the Saddle. His style of singing was in a golden voiced manner reminiscent of Nelson Eddy.

=== Smith Ballew ===
Sykes "Smith" Ballew made a series of five films for producer Sol Lesser that were released through 20th Century Fox.

=== Fred Leedon Scott ===
Fred Leedon Scott made a series of films initially with Jed Buell's Spectrum Pictures beginning with Romance rides the Range (1963).

=== Bob Baker ===
Bob Baker starred in a series of a dozen films for Universal Pictures from 1937. He later appeared as a second lead to Johnny Mack Brown from 1939.

=== Roy Rogers ===
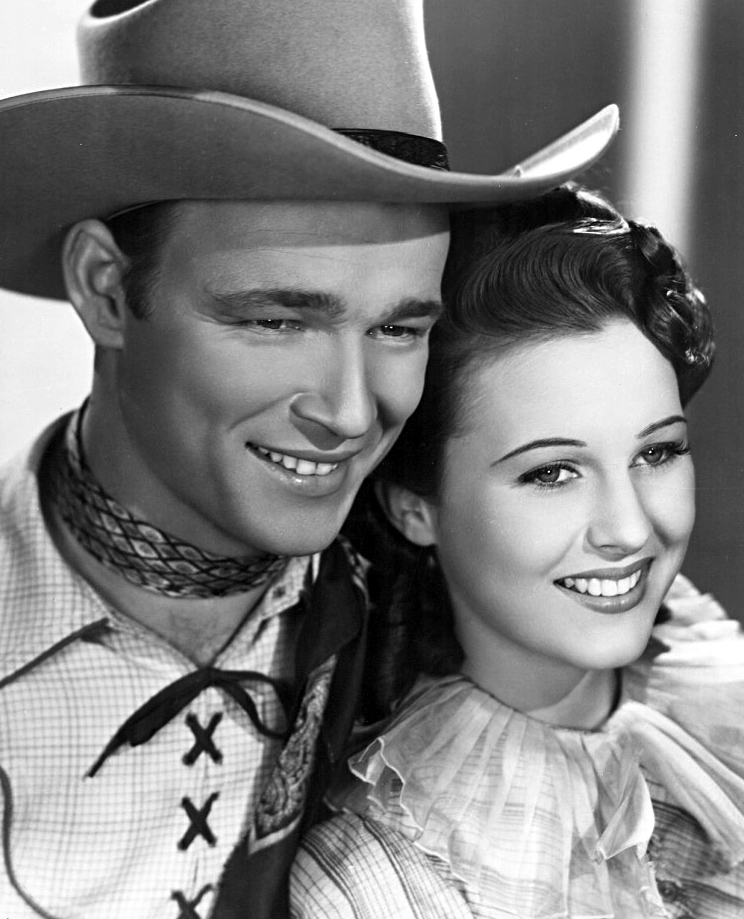
Roy Rogers and Mary Hart in Shine On, Harvest Moon (1938)

Autry's status as the top singing cowboy was never in question until 1937, when disagreements made him temporarily walk out on his contract with Republic Studios. The studio's chosen replacement, Roy Rogers, who had previously appeared only in minor roles (including a memorable appearance opposite Autry while still billed under his real name, Leonard Slye), quickly grew popular when given the chance to star. By the time Autry returned, he found himself challenged for top movie singing cowboy status by the blossoming career of his new rival Rogers, although Rogers never neared Autry's juggernaut level of record sales. When Autry enlisted in the Army Air Corps during World War II, Roy Rogers became the "King of the Cowboys," competing head-to-head with Autry for the rest of the decade. Autry and Rogers (as a member of the "Sons of the Pioneers" singing group), had appeared together in the 1935 Autry vehicle, The Old Corral, Rogers' second film, before the studio chose him as an Autry replacement and renamed him during Autry's walkout two years later. Autry and Rogers never made a movie together after Rogers began his solo film career, although Rogers did appear in a supporting role with ex-singing cowboy John Wayne in Dark Command (1940).

=== Tex Ritter ===
In 1936, Edward Finney of the recently formed Grand National Pictures decided on a singing cowboy for their studio and screen-tested Tex Ritter, who began a series of films with the studio beginning with Song of the Gringo. Ritter recorded "Do Not Forsake Me Oh My Darlin'," the movie title-track song for High Noon (1952). The song became a hit and received an Academy Award for Best Music, Original Song, for 1953. Tex Ritter was also the father of television sitcom actor John Ritter.

=== Herb Jeffries ===
Herb Jeffries made a series of films beginning with Harlem on the Prairie (1937).

=== Dorothy Page ===
Singing cowgirl Dorothy Page made three films for Grand National Pictures in 1939.

=== James Newill ===
With the fame of the operetta Rose-Marie and singing cowboy films, a series of films with actor singer James Newill playing a singing Mountie, Renfrew of the Royal Mounted, were released by Grand National between 1937 and 1940.

=== Addison "Jack" Randall ===
Observing the success of the singing cowboy at other studios, Monogram Pictures engaged Addison Randall for a series of Western films where he initially sang.

=== Eddie Dean ===
Having a variety of experience in supporting roles in many Westerns, Producers Releasing Corporation gave Eddie Dean a series of films beginning with Song of Old Wyoming in 1945.

=== Ken Curtis ===
Ken Curtis, a member of the Sons of the Pioneers singing group, made a series of Westerns at Columbia Pictures accompanied by the Hoosier Hot Shots. A son-in-law of director John Ford, he appeared in numerous Ford films as basically a (sometimes non-singing) supporting player, including The Searchers, in which he sings a part of "Skip To My Lou," and later played Festus Hagen on the television series Gunsmoke for eleven seasons.

=== Rex Allen ===
Rex Allen made his debut in films with Republic Pictures' The Arizona Cowboy in 1950. He is credited with making the last theatrical singing cowboy Western Phantom Stallion in 1954.

=== Vaughn Monroe ===
Popular singer Vaughn Monroe filmed two Westerns for Republic Pictures, Singing Guns (1950) in which he sang the hit song "Mule Train," and Toughest Man in Arizona (1952).

=== Other ===
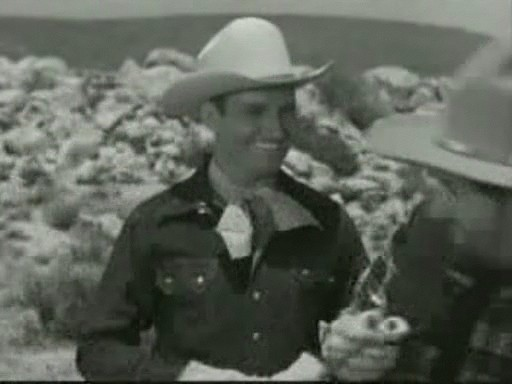
The Gene Autry Show (1950)

Other notable actors who became famous as singing cowboys were Jimmy Wakely and John 'Dusty' King who appeared in the Range Busters series. Non-singing cowboy actors such as Buck Jones complained that producers would find it too easy to pad out the length of a film with songs rather than action, characterization, or plot exposition.

With the advent of television, the making of B-movies dropped off and the era of singing cowboys was coming to an end. Autry and Rogers went on to star in The Gene Autry Show and The Roy Rogers Show, respectively, but the series' runs ended by the close of the decade (1950s), and the singing cowboy gradually ceased to exist in popular culture except as an exercise in nostalgia. Though he did not appear in the film, Tex Ritter sang the continuing ballad of High Noon.

The singing cowboy image has since been parodied, most notably in the 1985 film Rustlers' Rhapsody, with Tom Berenger portraying a stereotypical singing cowboy, and in the Pixar film Toy Story 2. The Coen brothers use singing cowboys in two films; Alden Ehrenreich portrays singing cowboy Hobie Doyle in their 2016 movie Hail, Caesar!, and Tim Blake Nelson portrays the title character in their 2018 movie The Ballad of Buster Scruggs. The musical group Riders in the Sky continues the tradition of the singing cowboy today.

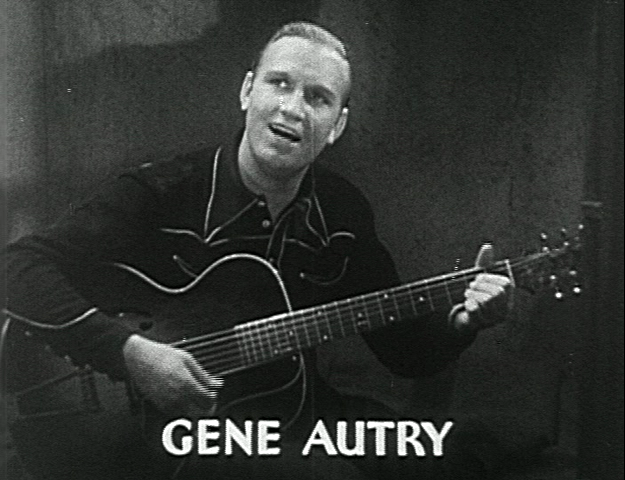
Autry in 1936

- Don Edwards
- Stuart Hamblen
- Kirby Grant
- Monte Hale
- Jorge Negrete
- Carl T. Sprague
- Dick Thomas
