= Falset =

Falset can refer to:

- Falset, Tarragona, the principal village of the comarca of the Priorat in Catalonia
- Falset (music), pitch-control of a harmonic of a brass instrument

== See also ==
- Falsetto
