= N. Howard Thorp =

Nathan Howard "Jack" Thorp (June 10, 1867 – June 4, 1940) was an American collector and writer of cowboy songs and cowboy poetry. Starting in 1889, he collected cowboy material while living in New Mexico. His small book Songs of the Cowboys was published there in 1908. It was the first such book ever published, containing the words to only 23 songs, including the now-classic "The Streets of Laredo" and "Little Joe the Wrangler". A greatly expanded second edition was published in 1921. Today, Thorp is credited with being the first person to take a serious interest in collecting and preserving the homespun ballads of the American West.

== Early life ==
Nathan Howard Thorp was the youngest of three sons of a New York City lawyer and real estate investor. As a child he summered at his brother's ranch in Nebraska, and at nineteen he moved there. Later he moved to New Mexico, where he worked as a cowboy and a civil engineer, operated cattle and sheep ranches, and served as New Mexico's state cattle inspector. He married in 1903, living in Palma (100 miles east of Albuquerque) and Santa Fe before moving closer to Albuquerque in 1935.

== Career ==
Jack Thorp began collecting and writing cowboy songs in 1889; his Songs of the Cowboys was published in Estancia, New Mexico in 1908. An expanded version was published by Houghton Mifflin in 1921. His later publications included Tales of the Chuck Wagon (1926) and Pardner of the Wind: Story of the Southwestern Cowboy (published posthumously in 1941 with Neil M. Clark). His fiction and poetry also appeared in New Mexico Magazine, The Cattleman, The Atlantic Monthly, Poetry, and The Literary Digest. Cowland, a book-length story targeted towards a younger audience, remains unpublished.

From 1936 to 1939 Thorp worked for the Works Progress Administration’s New Mexico Federal Writers’ Project.

N. Howard Thorp died at his home in Alameda, New Mexico, on June 4, 1940.

A new edition of Songs of the Cowboys, including biographical material and a CD with many of its songs played on historical instruments, was published in 2005 by the University of New Mexico Press.
