= D. J. O'Malley =

American poet

Dominick John O'Malley (April 30, 1867 – March 6, 1943), also known as Dominick White and The N Bar N Kid White, was an American composer of cowboy songs and cowboy poetry, as well as a writer on Western subjects. He is best known for his song "When the Work's All Done This Fall", originally published as the poem "After the Roundup".

== Early life ==
O'Malley was born in New York City, the son of a Civil War soldier who stayed in the military after hostilities ended. When D. J. was about two years old, his biological father had surgery to remove a minie ball, dying shortly thereafter. O'Malley's mother, Margaret, quickly married Charles H. White, also a soldier, giving her children his last name. The family spent several years at Army bases in Kansas, Wyoming, and Montana. In 1881, Mr. White disappeared and Margaret and her children moved to Miles City, Montana.

== Working life ==
D. J. soon found work as a horse wrangler for the N Bar N ranch near Miles City. From 1881 to 1896, he worked for the N Bar N in various jobs, including driving cattle from Texas to Montana. He was proud to have been a "rep" representing the N Bar N during roundups. The ranch was sold in 1896, and O'Malley rode for several Eastern Montana outfits including the M Diamond, the Bow and Arrow, the L U Bar, and the Quarter Circle L. He became a special deputy sheriff in Rosebud and was an inspector for the Montana Stock Growers Association, as well as a guard at the Montana State Prison.

In 1911 he moved to Eau Claire, Wisconsin, where he operated a raspberry farm and worked at the Gillette Rubber Company. He died in Eau Claire on March 6, 1943.

== Literary career ==
In addition to poems, O'Malley wrote many stories about his friends and his work in the West. This work began in the 1880s, and continued for over fifty years. Many of his early pieces were published in the Miles City Stock-Growers Journal, under the pen name N Bar N Kid White. Many were popularized as songs. O'Malley's stories offer glimpses into the history of the N Bar N Ranch and into cowboy culture. As the stories and songs worked their way around the West, they were often altered or added to, and their origins were sometimes lost. When would-be poets later claimed authorship of his work, he could refute them by bringing out the originals with the dates right on the page.

His career as a cowboy poet began in 1889 when he penned "To the Memory of Wiley Collins" about a chuckwagon cook who was killed by lightning. His other poems include "A Cowboy's Soliloquy", "The D2 Horse Wrangler", and "A Busted Cowboy's Christmas", all well known in the cowboy poetry community. His prose includes episodes such as "The Experiences of the F U F Roundup Crew Caught in the Cloudburst of June 1891" and "Where Custer Fell".

He collected many of his works in a book entitled The N Bar N Kid White, published posthumously in 2000 by the Montana Historical Society, which holds his collected papers.

The Charles Ives song "Charlie Rutlage", published in his 1922 collection 114 Songs, is a setting of a text by O'Malley which at the time of composition was thought to be anonymous.
