= The Bob Burns Show =

American old-time radio comedy program

- Other names: The Arkansas Traveler
- Genre: Comedy
- Running time: 30 minutes
- Country of origin: United States
- Language: English
- Syndicates: NBC; CBS
- Starring: Bob Burns; Ginny Simms; Edna Mae Oliver; Ann Thomas; James Gleason; Una Merkel; Shirley Ross; Mantan Moreland; Ben Carter
- Directed by: Thomas Freebairn-Smith; Joe Thompson; Andrew C. Love
- Produced by: Thomas Freebairn-Smith; Joe Thompson; Andrew C. Love
- Original release: September 16, 1941 – May 25, 1947
- No. of series: 6
- No. of episodes: 230 (original series); 2 (failed revival series)
- Sponsored by: Campbell's Soup; Lever Brothers' Lifebuoy Soap; American Home Products; Dreft (see below)

The Bob Burns Show (also known as The Arkansas Traveler) was an American old-time radio comedy program that starred comedian Bob Burns. The program derived from a character Burns performed for five years on Bing Crosby's Kraft Music Hall entitled "The Arkansas Traveler".

The program originally premiered as The Arkansas Traveler on September 16, 1941 on CBS. In 1943, Bob Burns moved his program over to the Red Network of the National Broadcasting Company. The January 7 broadcast was the first episode to use the title The Bob Burns Show.

The program moved from its Thursdays at 7:30 timeslot to Sundays at 6:30 for its last season on September 29, 1946. The program concluded its run on May 25, 1947. Two failed revival attempts of the program aired between November 1947 and July 1949. Both audition programs were sponsored by Dreft but never made air.

Other principal actors on the program included actors Ginny Simms, Edna Mae Oliver, Ann Thomas, James Gleason, Una Merkel and Shirley Ross.

== Bob Burns and the Kraft Music Hall ==
Bob Burns (born Robin Burns) grew up in the town of Van Buren, Arkansas. As a boy, Burns played trombone and cornet in the town's "Queen City Silver Cornet Band". Before radio, Burns was known as a musician, creating his own string band at the age of 13. During his teeming years, Burns invented an instrument which he called a "bazooka" out of a gas pipe. The bazooka functioned like a crude trombone and had a narrow range. The bazooka would become a permanent part of Burns' comedy act.

In 1930, Burns' radio career began as a character on a local Los Angeles radio program called The Fun Factory as the character "Soda Pop". After several jobs at several different radio stations in Los Angeles in 1935, Burns went to New York and got a spot on Rudy Vallée's The Fleischmann's Yeast Hour. In his book on old-time radio, author John Dunning quotes Newsweek in describing Bob Burns as "...resembling Gene Tunney but..." having a voice "...like Will Rogers". After the death of Rogers in August 1935 in an Alaskan plane crash, Burns reverted to his old homespun act on The Fleischmann Hour.

With assistance of bandleader and radio personality Paul Whiteman, Burns then landed a 26-week engagement on singer Bing Crosby's Kraft Music Hall. The engagement began when Crosby took over hosting duties of the program in January 1936. Burns became an audience favorite with his "Arkansas Traveler" character. Burns created the character sometime after World War I and performed the act on stage. The character was patterned after Col. Sandford C. Faulkner, teller of tall tales, fiddle player, and composer of the popular fiddle tune "The Arkansas Traveler".

On each episode of Kraft Music Hall, Burns would make his way to the microphone, say "I remember one time back in Van Buren, Arkansas...", then would proceed in telling a fictional account of his fictitious relatives and townspeople including but not limited to characters Uncle Fud, Aunt Peachy and Grandpa Snazzy, characters that would follow Burns with him to The Bob Burns Show. Burns was so popular on the program that he was asked to stay past the original twenty-six weeks.

Burns stayed on the Kraft Music Hall for another five years until 1941. At this point, Burns was receiving $5,000 an episode and Kraft considered this too expensive for their liking.

So Burns was let go from his contract and went on to his own radio show, The Arkansas Traveler.

== The Arkansas Traveler ==
The Arkansas Traveler premiered on CBS Radio on Tuesday September 16, 1941. The program was described as partly monologue and partly situation comedy. In the original cast was Burns playing the Arkansas Traveler and Edna Mae Oliver portraying the eccentric nurse, Hildegarde Withers, that she had popularized in film. Ginny Simms was the program's original vocalist. The program's music was originally provided by Billy Artz and Spike Jones and his band, the City Slickers. The program's original sponsor was Campbell's Soup.

The program's second season premiered on October 7, 1942. The season premiered to good ratings, however, a month into season two, cast regular Edna Mae Oliver died of intestinal issues at the age of 59. With a minor change in cast, the move to Wednesdays at 9. Sponsorship changed from Campbell's over to Lever Brothers' Lifebuoy soap.

CBS broadcast the last episode of Arkansas Traveler on December 30, 1942.

=== The Bob Burns Show ===
On January 7, 1943, the program was picked up by NBC for its Red Network. The program's title was changed to The Bob Burns Show and moved to Thursday nights at 7:30. The program's format was slightly altered with the change in networks.

To replace Oliver, actress Ann Thomas was brought in to portray the role of Sharon O'Shaughnessy, Burns' comic foil. Actors Una Merkel and James Gleason were also brought in to participate in more contemporary sketches with Burns. The musical accompaniment also changed with Gordon Jenkins and Ray Sinatra (cousin of Frank Sinatra) becoming the musicians of the program.

The 1943–1946 years proved to be the best and highest-rated years of the program. The beginning of season four saw the departure of vocalist Simms on the program and the inclusion of her replacement singer Shirley Ross. Season five saw the inclusion of black comedians Mantan Moreland and Ben Carter. Moreland left the program after Carter's death in December 1946.

The program's sixth season proved to be its last. A change in sponsor from Lifebuoy to American Foods and a change in timeslot from Thursdays at 7:30 to Sundays at 6:30 proved to be the program's demise. The final episode was broadcast on May 25, 1947. Burns never committed to a weekly series again. His last appearance was on Ed Sullivan's Toast of the Town in 1955. Burns died on February 2, 1956, of kidney cancer.

== Failed revival attempts ==
On November 25, 1947, an audition show was held for possibly a seventh season of The Bob Burns Show or for a proposed new program entitled The Bob Burns Program sponsored by Dreft. The episode starred Burns and some of his old cast members and reunited Burns with his old musical director Spike Jones. The audition show never made air and the proposed new series was thrown out.

The second proposed Bob Burns Program audition show took place on July 1, 1949. Again Burns was reunited with Jones and his band. The vocalist for this show was Cindy Walker and featured Jack Pepper and Tony Romano in the cast. Sammy Kaye handled orchestration. This show also never made air.

== Broadcast history ==
| Timeslot | Starting date | Ending date | Network | Sponsor |
|---|---|---|---|---|
| Tuesdays at 8:30-9:00 pm | September 16, 1941 | June 9, 1942 | CBS | Campbell's Soup |
| Wednesdays at 9-9:30 pm | October 7, 1942 | December 30, 1942 | CBS | Lever Brothers' Lifebuoy soap |
| Thursdays at 7:30-8:00 pm | January 7, 1943 | June 27, 1946 | NBC Red | Lever Brothers' Lifebuoy soap |
| Sundays at 6:30-7:00 pm | September 29, 1946 | May 25, 1947 | NBC Red | American Foods |
