= I'm an Old Cowhand (From the Rio Grande) =

1936 song by Johnny Mercer

Single by Bing Crosby
- A-side: "I'm an Old Cowhand (From the Rio Grande)"
- B-side: "I Can't Escape from You"
- Released: 1936
- Recorded: July 17, 1936
- Length: 2:40
- Label: Decca Records 871
- Songwriter: Johnny Mercer

"I'm an Old Cowhand (From the Rio Grande)" is a satirical western song written by Johnny Mercer, introduced in the Paramount Pictures film Rhythm on the Range and sung by its star, Bing Crosby. Its humorous self-deprecating lyrics poke fun at being a modern person pretending to be a cowhand (a cowboy) despite having little in common with real cattle herders of the Old West.

The Crosby commercial recording was made on July 17, 1936, with Jimmy Dorsey & his Orchestra for Decca Records. It was a huge hit in 1936, reaching No. 2 in the charts of the day, and it greatly furthered Mercer's career. Crosby recorded the song again in 1954 for his album Bing: A Musical Autobiography. Members of the Western Writers of America chose it as one of the Top 100 Western songs of all time. It has also been covered by numerous jazz musicians, including Sonny Rollins, Monty Alexander, Joshua Redman, and John Scofield.

== Background ==
Mercer and his wife were driving across the US en route to his hometown, Savannah, Georgia, after having apparently failed to succeed in Hollywood. Mercer was amused by the sight of people dressed like cowboys, with spurs and ten-gallon hats, driving (Mercer's lyrics would joke that "I ride the range in a Ford V8") instead of riding horses. Singing cowboys were also popular in films and on the radio then, so Mercer's lyrics would later joke about knowing all the cowboy songs by learning them through radio, not through experience as a cowboy. Within 15 minutes, writing on the back of an envelope, Mercer transferred the image he saw into a song whose satirical lyrics vented some of his own bitter frustration with Hollywood.

== Other recordings ==
The song has also been sung by Roy Rogers (Sons of the Pioneers), Sophia Johnson, Carson Robison, Bobby Darin, Tex Ritter, The Mills Brothers, Johnnie Ray, Jack Teagarden, Patsy Montana, Frank Sinatra, Steve Lawrence, Lorne Greene, Dan Hicks, Harry Connick Jr., and The Hot Club of Cowtown, among others. A notable jazz version by Sonny Rollins leads off his 1957 album Way Out West. Instrumental versions were done by Ray Conniff on his album 'S Wonderful! (1956) and Herb Alpert and the Tijuana Brass on their album The Brass are Comin' (1969). Other jazz recordings have been recorded by Grant Green, Monty Alexander, Clark Terry, Joshua Redman, John Scofield, and Acker Bilk.

== Film and other appearances ==
- 1936 Rhythm on the Range - performed by Bing Crosby, Leonid Kinskey, Martha Raye, Bob Burns, and Louis Prima, accompanied by The Sons of the Pioneers in a campfire scene.
- 1940 Me Feelins is Hurt - a western-themed Popeye cartoon, as background music
- 1943 King of the Cowboys - sung by Roy Rogers (playing Roy Rogers).
- 1947 The Mild West, a Paramount Noveltoon, in a bouncing ball sequence
- 1954 I Love Lucy - sung by Lucille Ball and Vivian Vance in the season 3 episode "Home Movies".
- 1979 M*A*S*H series 7, Episode 18 "The Price" - Colonel Sherman Potter (played by Harry Morgan) sung the first verse whilst on his horse "Sophie", as he was riding into the 4077th unit, at the beginning of the episode.
- 1987 Innerspace - a henchman named "The Cowboy" (played by Robert Picardo) hums and sings a verse along with the Sonny Rollins recording.
- 2012 Men in Black 3 - The Sons of the Pioneers version is heard.
