= When the Work's All Done This Fall =

- by D. J. O'Malley
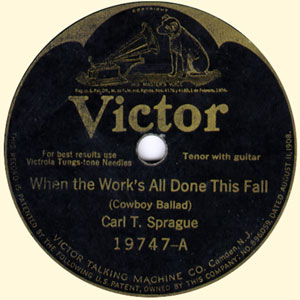
- The label for Carl T. Sprague's recording of "When the Work's All Done This Fall"
- Catalogue: MFH 782
- Genre: Western Music
- Published: 1893: Miles City Stock-Growers Journal

When the Work's All Done this Fall is a classic American cowboy song, written as a poem by D. J. O'Malley (1867–1943). The work was first published in the Miles City Stock-Growers Journal in 1893, titled After the Roundup, over the pen name D.J. White. The lyrics and a melody were first collected from tradition and published by John Lomax in 1910 in Cowboy Songs and Other Frontier Ballads.

This poem, like many others of the day, was intended to be sung as lyrics to the melodies of other popular songs.

Carl T. Sprague recorded When the Work's All Done This Fall in 1924. It sold over 900,000 copies, at a time when 5,000 was typical for a successful recording. More recently, it has been recorded by artists as diverse as Michael Martin Murphey, Marty Robbins, Kyle Evans, Cowboy Celtic, STAMPEDE!, and Harry Jackson. Many variations of the words appear in the various songs.

Members of the Western Writers of America chose it as one of the Top 100 Western songs of all time.
