= Bob Burns House =

Historic house in Arkansas, United States

- U.S. National Register of Historic Places
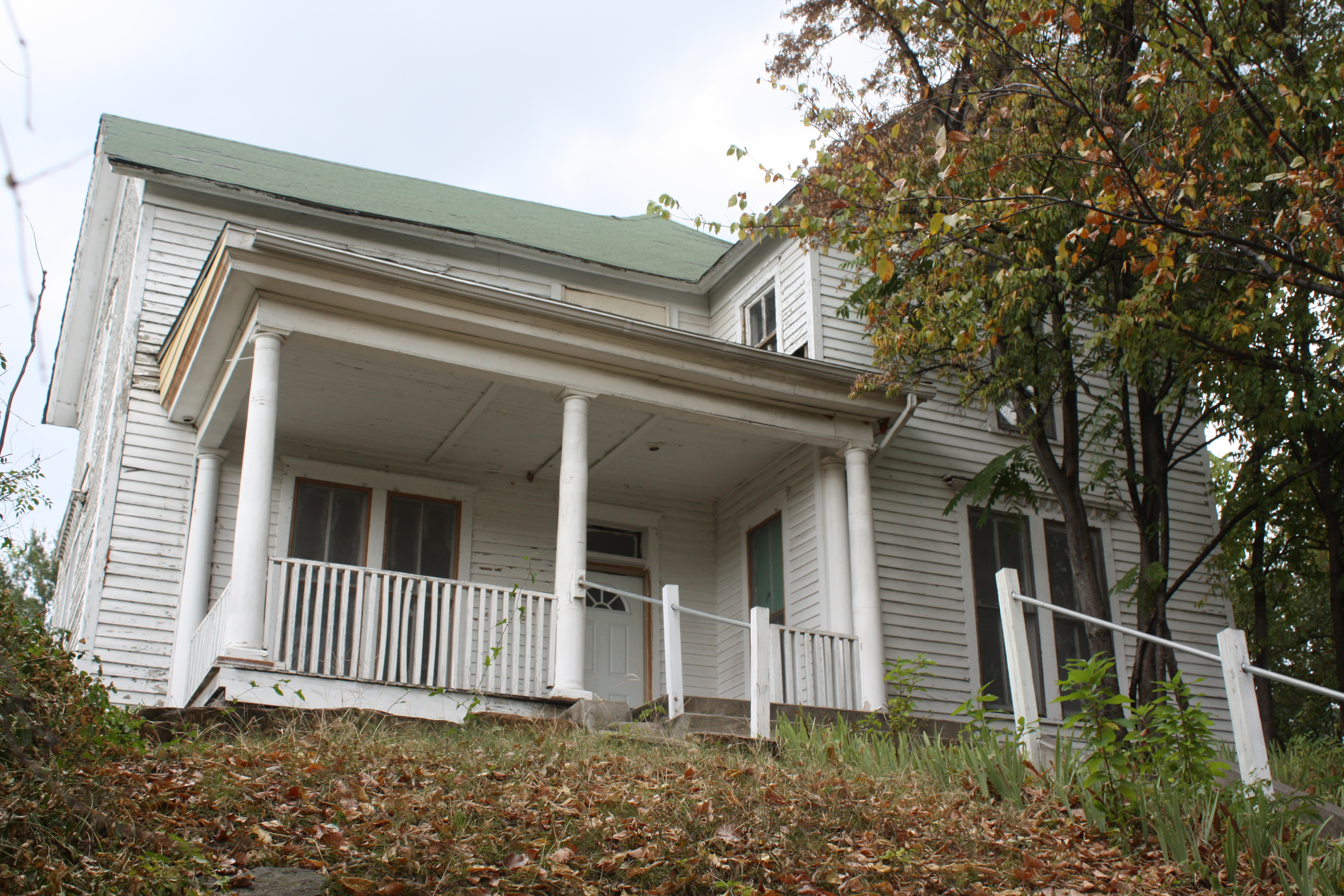

- Location within Arkansas Location within the United States
- Location: 821 Jefferson St., Van Buren, Arkansas
- Coordinates: 35°26′9″N 94°21′2″W
- Area: 0.1 acres (0.040 ha)
- Architectural style: Late Victorian
- NRHP reference No.: 76000399
- Added to NRHP: April 30, 1976

The Bob Burns House is a historic house at 821 Jefferson Street in Van Buren, Arkansas. It is a two-story wood frame late Victorian house, built in 1885 by a local merchant. The house is most notable as the childhood home of Bob Burns (1890-1956), a famous radio comedian of the 1930s and 1940s. The Burn family (the "s" was added to Bob Burns' stage name) moved into this house in 1896 and purchased it in 1901. Bob Burns and his brother Farrar made their start in music, with Bob being credited with the invention of the bazooka, a musical instrument bearing some resemblance to a trombone. During Burns' period of fame his mother operated a gift shop out of their home.

The house was listed on the National Register of Historic Places in 1976.

== See also ==
- National Register of Historic Places listings in Crawford County, Arkansas
