= The Ballad of Buster Scruggs =

2018 Western film by the Coen brothers

- Theatrical release poster
- Directed by: Joel Coen; Ethan Coen
- Written by: Joel Coen; Ethan Coen
- Based on: All Gold Canyon by Jack London; The Girl Who Got Rattled by Stewart Edward White
- Produced by: Joel Coen; Ethan Coen; Megan Ellison; Sue Naegle; Robert Graf
- Starring: Tyne Daly; James Franco; Brendan Gleeson; Bill Heck; Grainger Hines; Zoe Kazan; Harry Melling; Liam Neeson; Tim Blake Nelson; Jonjo O'Neill; Chelcie Ross; Saul Rubinek; Tom Waits
- Cinematography: Bruno Delbonnel
- Edited by: Roderick Jaynes (Note: Roderick Jaynes is the shared pseudonym used by the Coen brothers for their editing.)
- Music by: Carter Burwell
- Production companies: Annapurna Pictures; Mike Zoss Productions
- Distributed by: Netflix
- Release dates: August 31, 2018 (Venice); November 9, 2018 (United States)
- Running time: 133 minutes
- Country: United States
- Language: English

The Ballad of Buster Scruggs (titled on-screen as The Ballad of Buster Scruggs and Other Tales of the American Frontier) is a 2018 American Western black comedy anthology film written, directed, produced, and edited by the Coen brothers. It stars Tim Blake Nelson, Tyne Daly, James Franco, Brendan Gleeson, Bill Heck, Grainger Hines, Zoe Kazan, Harry Melling, Liam Neeson, Jonjo O'Neill, Chelcie Ross, Saul Rubinek, and Tom Waits. It consists of six vignettes set in the post-Civil War American frontier.

The film premiered at the 75th Venice International Film Festival on August 31, 2018, where it won the Golden Osella Award for Best Screenplay. After a limited theatrical run beginning on November 9, 2018, it was released on Netflix on November 16. The National Board of Review named it one of its top ten films of 2018. The film earned three nominations at the 91st Academy Awards: Best Adapted Screenplay, Best Costume Design, and Best Original Song ("When a Cowboy Trades His Spurs for Wings").

== Plot ==
=== "The Ballad of Buster Scruggs" ===
Buster Scruggs, a cheerful singing cowboy clad in white, arrives at an isolated cantina full of outlaws. He exchanges insults with another patron before shooting everyone as they reach for their guns. Buster then wanders into Frenchman's Gulch and enters a saloon, leaving his guns at the door to comply with its no firearms policy. He joins a game of poker that another player has suddenly left, but discovers the player vacated the seat after being dealt the dead man's hand, which the other players insist Buster play now that he has seen the cards. When Buster refuses, a large menacing player named Joe stands up and draws a concealed revolver. After failing to persuade Joe to end the confrontation, Buster repeatedly kicks a loose plank in the poker table, which tips Joe's hand so that his gun discharges into his face. Having shot himself three times, Joe falls dead. Buster breaks the barroom tension and delights the patrons with a boisterous song about "Surly Joe". (Note: The character's name as listed in the film credits is "Çurly Joe" with a cedilla under the first letter. The song's lyrics also include a line with the letter 'Ç'. In the subtitles when Buster sings the song, the name is spelled "Surly Joe".) (Note: The song is a reference to the Marlene Dietrich song "Little Joe the Wrangler" from the 1939 film Destry Rides Again.)

Joe's sheepish brother, determined to avenge his sibling, challenges Buster to a gunfight. Buster complies and proceeds to shoot off each of the fingers of his opponent's right hand before stylishly finishing him off with the sixth shot delivered over-the-shoulder using a mirror. A young singing cowboy clad in black then rides into town and politely challenges Buster. Buster obliges but, to his surprise, the young man is an even faster draw and shoots him in the forehead. Buster examines the bullet hole in his hat before collapsing, admitting in voice-over that he should have foreseen that "you can't be top dog forever". The young man and Buster then sing a bittersweet duet, "When A Cowboy Trades His Spurs For Wings", as Buster's spirit rises from his body and floats toward heaven, with angel wings and a lyre and expressing hope of a place above where people are better than they are on Earth.

=== "Near Algodones" ===
A young cowboy robs an isolated New Mexico bank. As he flees, the bank teller shoots at him, forcing him to take cover behind a well. He returns fire, but the teller charges at him while wearing a washboard with several pots and pans as armor, which deflect all the cowboy's bullets as the teller repeatedly cackles "Pan shot!" The teller knocks the cowboy out with the butt of his shotgun.

When the cowboy regains consciousness, he is sitting on his horse under a tree with his hands tied and a noose around his neck. The leader of a posse asks for his final words and says the posse sentenced him to death while he was unconscious. The execution is interrupted by attacking Comanche warriors, who slaughter the posse but leave the cowboy sitting on his horse with the noose around his neck.

After a time, a drover passes by and frees the cowboy, who joins him on his drive. The drover is a rustler, and another posse chases him and the cowboy down. The drover escapes, but the posse captures the cowboy and takes him into town, where the judge summarily orders him to be hanged. As the cowboy stands on the gallows with three other men awaiting execution, he looks at the weeping man to his left and quips, "First time?" The cowboy's eyes settle on a pretty young woman in the crowd, who smiles at him before the hangman abruptly hoods him and pulls the trapdoor lever to cheers from the crowd.

=== "Meal Ticket" ===
An aging impresario and his artist, Harrison, a usually uncommunicative young man with no arms or legs, travel from town to town in a wagon that converts into a small stage where Harrison theatrically recites classics such as Shelley's poem "Ozymandias"; the biblical story of Cain and Abel; works by Shakespeare, including Sonnet 29 and The Tempest; and Abraham Lincoln's Gettysburg Address. The impresario collects money from the crowd at the end of each performance, but profits are dwindling as they visit increasingly remote towns with smaller, less appreciative audiences.

After a performance that yields no profit, the impresario observes a man nearby drawing a crowd with a chicken that ostensibly performs basic arithmetic by pecking at painted numbers to answer addition and subtraction problems the audience calls out. After buying the chicken, the impresario drives the wagon through a mountain pass and stops by a bridge over a rushing river. He walks to the center of the bridge and drops a large stone to gauge the water's depth before returning to the wagon. The impresario resumes driving, with the caged chicken as his only passenger.

=== "All Gold Canyon" ===
A grizzled prospector arrives in a pristine mountain valley and digs for gold in a grassy meadow. He pans shovelfuls of dirt to count gold specks, then digs a deeper hole once he has triangulated the likely source. After his first night camping, he spots an owl tending its treetop nest. When he climbs up and reaches the nest, the owl's watchful gaze from a nearby tree causes him to replace three of the four eggs he had taken for his breakfast.

On his third day, he digs out gold nuggets of increasing size before finally reaching "Mr. Pocket", a large gold vein running through the quartz he has uncovered. A young man who has been secretly watching him work approaches the edge of the hole. He shoots the prospector in the back and the prospector falls face down. When the young man jumps into the hole to take the gold, the prospector stops feigning death, wrests the young man's gun away, and shoots him dead. The prospector cleans and assesses his wound in the stream, and verifies that it is not lethal. He finishes mining the gold, buries the young man's body in the same hole, and departs.

=== "The Gal Who Got Rattled" ===
Alice Longabaugh and her older brother, Gilbert, an inept businessman, are en route to Oregon by wagon train, where Gilbert claims a new business partner will marry his sister. Gilbert has a violent coughing fit and dies shortly after the trip starts. The wagon train's leaders, Mr. Billy Knapp and Mr. Arthur, attribute Gilbert's death to cholera and help Alice bury him.

Though she has no definite prospects in Oregon, Alice continues the trip rather than return east. Matt, the young man Gilbert hired to lead their wagon, claims Gilbert promised him a high wage of $400, half of which he expects when they reach the halfway point, Fort Laramie. Alice believes Gilbert's money was buried with him and conveys her predicament to Billy, who offers his support in contemplating how to proceed. He also does Alice the favor of first attempting to shoot Gilbert's small dog, President Pierce (named for Franklin Pierce), then scaring him off, because the dog's constant barking has drawn widespread complaint.

Billy proposes to solve Alice's dilemma by marrying her in Fort Laramie, assuming Gilbert's debt, and retiring from leading wagon trains to build a home and family with her on the 640 acres in Oregon that they can claim according to an 1872 land grant act. Alice is surprised by Billy's proposal, but has grown fond of him and accepts. Billy informs the trail boss, Mr. Arthur, that this will be their last ride together.

The following morning, Mr. Arthur notices Alice missing. He rides over a nearby hill to find her reunited with President Pierce and laughing as he barks at some prairie dogs. Mr. Arthur then spots a Native American scout and advancing war party. Preparing for a fight, he gives Alice a pistol so that if he is killed, she can shoot herself to avoid capture. He twice drives back the charging warriors with his rifle, but a remaining warrior appears to kill him. Mr. Arthur kills the warrior, then discovers that, believing he was dead, Alice shot herself as he had instructed. Mr. Arthur walks back to the wagon train, unsure of what to say to Billy Knapp.

=== "The Mortal Remains" ===
An Englishman (Thigpen), an Irishman (Clarence), a Frenchman (René), a lady (Mrs. Betjeman), and a fur trapper ride to Fort Morgan, Colorado, in a stagecoach. Thigpen says that he and Clarence often travel this route "ferrying cargo", alluding to a corpse on the roof, but does not specify the nature of their business.

The Trapper rambles about his past relationship with a Hunkpapa woman in which neither knew the other's language but were able to understand each other's emotions, leading him to conclude that people are all essentially alike. Mrs. Betjeman, a devout Christian, indignantly retorts that there are only two kinds of people, upright and sinning, and says she knows this because her husband, whom she is traveling to meet after having been apart for three years, is a retired Chautauqua lecturer on "moral and spiritual hygiene." René challenges both her views and the trapper's, reflecting on the unique and subjective nature of human experiences. As an example, he questions whether Mr. Betjeman conceives of love the same way Mrs. Betjeman does, conjecturing that if he does not, perhaps he has not remained faithful to her during their separation.

Mrs. Betjeman becomes apoplectic, and René calls for the coach to be stopped, but the driver does not halt. Thigpen explains that the stage company's policy is not to stop for any reason. Clarence sings the folk song "The Unfortunate Lad", which calms Mrs. Betjeman. He and Thigpen then reveal themselves to be "reapers", or bounty hunters. Thigpen tells the group that their usual method is for him to distract their targets with stories while Clarence "thumps" them. Thigpen says he enjoys watching them die, especially the expression in their eyes as they "negotiate the passage" and "try to make sense of it".

The other three are visibly unsettled as they arrive at the dark and foreboding hotel in Fort Morgan. They remain in the coach while Thigpen and Clarence carry the corpse into the hotel and up its stairs, which are brightly lit from above by a white light. They then slowly disembark, and the coach departs without unloading any bags. Mrs. Betjeman and the trapper warily make their own way through the hotel door. René pauses to watch the coachman set off, then sets his top hat at a jaunty angle and enters with an air of amused resignation, closing the doors behind him.

== Cast ==
- The Ballad of Buster Scruggs
  - Tim Blake Nelson as Buster Scruggs
  - Willie Watson as the Kid
  - David Krumholtz as Frenchman in Saloon
  - E.E. Bell as Saloon Piano Player
  - Tom Proctor as Cantina Bad Man
  - Alejandro Patiño as Cantina Bartender
  - Clancy Brown as "Çurly Joe"
  - Danny McCarthy as Çurly Joe's Brother
- Near Algodones
  - James Franco as Cowboy
  - Stephen Root as Teller
  - Ralph Ineson as Posse Leader
  - Jesse Luken as Drover
- Meal Ticket
  - Liam Neeson as Impresario
  - Harry Melling as Harrison, the Artist
  - Paul Rae as Chicken Impresario
- All Gold Canyon
  - Tom Waits as Prospector
  - Sam Dillon as Young Man
- The Gal Who Got Rattled
  - Zoe Kazan as Alice Longabaugh
  - Bill Heck as Billy Knapp
  - Grainger Hines as Mr. Arthur
  - Jefferson Mays as Gilbert Longabaugh
  - Ethan Dubin as Matt
  - Eric Petersen as Boarder
  - Jackamoe Buzzell as Boarder #3
  - Rod Rondeaux as Sioux Chief
- The Mortal Remains
  - Tyne Daly as Mrs. Betjeman, the Lady
  - Brendan Gleeson as Clarence, the Irishman
  - Jonjo O'Neill as Thigpen, the Englishman
  - Saul Rubinek as René, Frenchman
  - Chelcie Ross as Trapper

== Music ==
The film uses music and song in every segment, sometimes as part of the action and sometimes as incidental music.

- "Cool Water", by Bob Nolan, performed by Tim Blake Nelson
- "Randall Collins", by Norman Blake
- "Surly Joe the Gambler", based on "Little Joe the Wrangler" and performed by Nelson
- "Carefree Drifter", by David Rawlings and Gillian Welch
- "When a Cowboy Trades His Spurs for Wings", by Rawlings and Welch, performed by Nelson and Willie Watson
- "Weela Weela Walya", traditional, performed by Liam Neeson
- "The Sash My Father Wore", traditional, performed by Neeson
- "Under the Double Eagle", by Josef Franz Wagner
- "Mother Machree", by Rida Johnson Young, Chauncey Olcott and Ernest Ball, performed by Tom Waits
- "La Ricciola", traditional, arranged by Gabe Witcher
- "Has Anybody Here Seen Kelly?", by C. W. Murphy (as Clarence W. Murphy) and Will Letters, performed by Jonjo O'Neill
- "Campfire Fiddle", by Gabe Witcher
- "The Unfortunate Lad", traditional, performed by Brendan Gleeson

== Production ==
Joel and Ethan Coen announced The Ballad of Buster Scruggs in January 2017 as a collaboration with Annapurna Television. In August 2017, Netflix announced it would stream the work worldwide.

The film was based on Western-themed short stories, some of which were written by the Coens over 20 to 25 years (accounts vary). Tim Blake Nelson was given the script for the eponymous story in 2002 and told that a second, "Meal Ticket", was in outline form, but did not hear until 2016 that the project would commence production. "All Gold Canyon" follows a Jack London story by the same name. "The Gal Who Got Rattled" was inspired by a story by Stewart Edward White, and is based in part on contemporaneous accounts, including those of heated arguments over pets. Some reports said the work would be a six-part television series, but the Coens intended the stories to be seen together, ordered them in the script they submitted to Annapurna, and shot the script as written.

Throughout 2017 and into 2018, Franco, Kazan, Daly, Watson, Ineson, Nelson, Root, Neeson, and Gleeson joined the cast.

The Ballad of Buster Scruggs was the Coens' first film to be shot digitally. The filmmakers saw the project, with its 800 visual effects and late magic hour shoots, as a good opportunity to experiment with the medium. Cinematographer Bruno Delbonnel employed a 1.85:1 aspect ratio and used a 27mm lens for most shots. "The Gal Who Got Rattled" was shot on private land north of Mitchell in the Nebraska Panhandle, with a casting call for "ordinary" Nebraskans as extras. "The Ballad of Buster Scruggs" and "Near Algodones" were shot on location in New Mexico; "The Mortal Remains" was shot entirely on a sound stage. "The Meal Ticket" and "All Gold Canyon" were shot in Colorado, the latter in Telluride.

Joel Coen said the shoot was physically demanding, involving exterior shots with uncovered sets, "really brutal weather", and much travel over wide-ranging locations. "It wouldn't have hurt if we were younger", he added. The long wagon train in "The Gal Who Got Rattled" proved especially challenging because of the difficulty of coordinating the oxen teams for timing and direction. Fourteen wagons were built from scratch in a New Mexico blacksmith shop, then shipped to Nebraska in pairs on flatbed trailers. Their design was influenced by the 1930 film The Big Trail. Most of the costumes were handmade for the production. Designer Mary Zophres credited historical reenactment supply companies for carrying hard-to-find period fabrics, noting that U.S. wool production, at the time of filming, was "practically nil".

=== Funding and distribution ===
From the outset, the Coens ruled out traditional film studio funding, seeing an industry shift in how smaller projects are financed. Joel Coen said that Netflix was investing in movies not based on Marvel Comics or other established action franchises, "which is pretty much the business of the studios now". The Coens had mixed feelings about Netflix distribution, as the film was given only a limited theatrical run before its streaming debut. They credited home video with helping establish their careers and admitted that they succumbed to the temptation to watch movie screeners at home rather than going to a theater; but the "hours and days and years you spend struggling over details is appreciated in a different way on a big screen", Joel Coen said.

Netflix funding was also the reason composer Carter Burwell conducted his score, with up to 40 musicians, at Abbey Road Studios in London, which he found ironic given that the film is an American Western. "In this case, Netflix as a distributor is not a signatory to any of the union agreements here. So they wanted to go to London so they wouldn't be involved in that. I mention that because more and more films are being made by companies that aren't signatories", Burwell said, adding that the issue had festered for the past 20 years, to the point where the film score recording business had disappeared from New York with no prospect of being rebuilt.

== Reception ==
=== Box office ===
Netflix does not disclose box-office results, but IndieWire tracked reserved online seating sales and deduced The Ballad of Buster Scruggs made $6,600 on its first day from its Los Angeles and New York City locations. It then estimated the film made about $36,000 in its opening weekend, for a four-day total of around $45,000. Had the results been made official, the debut per-venue estimates of $12,000 would have been the lowest of the Coen brothers' career. IndieWire estimated that the opening exceeded most Netflix releases and noted that, for the distributor, "getting people to see their films in theaters is not the point".

=== Critical response ===
On the review aggregator Rotten Tomatoes, the film holds an approval rating of 89% based on 234 reviews, with an average rating of 7.8/10. The website's critical consensus reads, "The Ballad of Buster Scruggs avoids anthology pitfalls with a consistent collection tied together by the Coen brothers' signature blend of dark drama and black humor." On Metacritic the film has a weighted average score of 79 out of 100, based on 48 critics, indicating "generally favorable reviews".

== Accolades ==
Award	Date of ceremony	Category	Recipient(s)	Result	Ref(s)
Venice Film Festival	August 29 – September 8, 2018	Best Screenplay Award	Joel and Ethan Coen	Won	
Hollywood Music in Media Awards	November 14, 2018	Original Score – Feature Film	Carter Burwell	Nominated	
Screen Actors Guild Awards	January 27, 2019	Outstanding Performance by a Stunt Ensemble in a Motion Picture	The Ballad of Buster Scruggs	Nominated	
British Academy Film Awards	February 10, 2019	Best Costume Design	Mary Zophres	Nominated	
Academy Awards	February 24, 2019	Best Adapted Screenplay	Joel and Ethan Coen	Nominated	
Academy Awards	February 24, 2019	Best Costume Design	Mary Zophres	Nominated	
Academy Awards	February 24, 2019	Best Original Song	"When a Cowboy Trades His Spurs for Wings" by David Rawlings and Gillian Welch	Nominated	

== Future ==
In 2025, during a Reddit AMA, Tim Blake Nelson expressed interest in a prequel to the film, writing:

I would love to do a Buster Scruggs prequel, but that's kinda up to Joel and Ethan, and they tend to move on once something is done. I'm sure that if they wanted to do a whole Big Lebowski series, they could spend the rest of their lives doing that, but they do a movie and move on. I just count myself lucky that I got to do the 15 minutes in that movie that was Buster Scruggs.
