= Rhythm on the Range =

1936 film by Norman Taurog

- Theatrical release poster
- Directed by: Norman Taurog
- Screenplay by: Walter DeLeon; Francis Martin; Jack Moffitt; Sidney Salkow
- Story by: Mervin J. Houser
- Produced by: Benjamin Glazer
- Starring: Bing Crosby; Frances Farmer; Bob Burns
- Cinematography: Karl Struss
- Edited by: Ellsworth Hoagland
- Distributed by: Paramount Pictures
- Release date: July 1, 1936
- Running time: 87 minutes
- Country: United States
- Language: English

Rhythm on the Range is a 1936 American Western musical film directed by Norman Taurog and starring Bing Crosby, Frances Farmer, and Bob Burns. Based on a story by Mervin J. Houser, the film is about a cowboy who meets a beautiful young woman while returning from a rodeo in the east, and invites her to stay at his California ranch to experience his simple, honest way of life. Rhythm on the Range was Crosby's only Western film (apart from the remake Stagecoach, 1966) and introduced two Western songs, "Empty Saddles" by Billy Hill and "I'm an Old Cowhand (From the Rio Grande)" by Johnny Mercer, the latter becoming a national hit song for Crosby. The film played a role in familiarizing its audience with the singing cowboy and Western music on a national level.

== Plot ==
Doris Halliday (Frances Farmer), the daughter of a wealthy New York banker, is engaged to wed a rich man she does not love. Her Aunt Penelope (Lucile Gleason), an outspoken Arizona rancher, objects to their marriage, claiming people should only marry for love. Doris sees her point and runs away the night before the wedding. She hides out in a boxcar occupied by traveling cowboy Jeff Larabee (Bing Crosby) and his prize bull, Cuddles. Jeff and Doris take an immediate dislike to one another. Despite a few romantic moments, they fight all night as the train carries them west. The next day, while the train is paused at a station, Cuddles attacks Doris. Jeff jumps from the boxcar to save her. Just then, the train resumes its journey. As a result, Jeff, Doris, and Cuddles are now stranded. They decide to part ways, but later, Doris steals a car and gives Jeff and his bull a lift to Arizona and his ranch house.

Meanwhile, Aunt Penelope and one of her cowboys, Buck (Bob Burns), take a train west. While traveling, they encounter Emma Mazda (Martha Raye), an aggressive young woman who flirts with Buck. Despite his not being interested, they get along anyway. In the meantime, Jeff and Doris arrive at his ranch house. While there, they hook up with Buck and Emma, who are now engaged. Buck suggests a double wedding, prodding Jeff, his best friend, to propose to Doris, as well, but he is reluctant. And the moment they do fall in love, they are located by Aunt Penelope, who sizes up the situation and accuses Jeff of being a male gold digger. Offended and unaware of Doris's financial position, Jeff walks away. Doris follows him, though, reaffirms her love, and that is all it takes. They vow to marry.

== Cast ==
- Bing Crosby as Jeff Larabee
- Frances Farmer as Doris Halliday
- Bob Burns as Buck
- Martha Raye as Emma Mazda
- Samuel S. Hinds as Robert Halliday
- Warren Hymer as Big Brain
- Lucile Gleason as Penelope 'Penny' Ryland
- George E. Stone as Shorty
- James Burke as Wabash
- Martha Sleeper as Constance 'Connie'
- Clem Bevans as Gila Bend
- Leonid Kinskey as Mischa
- Ellen Drew as Party Guest (uncredited)
- Louis Prima (uncredited)
- Roy Rogers (uncredited)

== Production ==
=== Filming locations ===
- Alabama Hills, Lone Pine, California, USA
- Paramount Studios, 5555 Melrose Avenue, Hollywood, Los Angeles, California, USA (studio)
- Madison Square Garden, New York City, New York, USA

=== Soundtrack ===
- "I'm an Old Cowhand from the Rio Grande" (Johnny Mercer) performed by Bing Crosby, Leonid Kinskey, Martha Raye, Bob Burns, and Louis Prima, accompanied by the Sons of the Pioneers, including Roy Rogers
- "I Can't Escape from You" (Richard A. Whiting and Leo Robin) performed by Bing Crosby
- "Empty Saddles" (Billy Hill - from a poem by J. Keirn Brennan) performed by Bing Crosby
- "Roundup Lullaby" (Gertrude Ross / Charles Badger Clark) performed in the boxcar by Bing Crosby
- "Settle Down You Cattle" performed by Bing Crosby with Beau Baldwin
- "(If You Can't Sing It) You'll Have to Swing It (Mr. Paganini)" (Sam Coslow) performed by Martha Raye accompanied by Bob Burns on his bazooka, Louis Prima, and The Sons of the Pioneers
- "Drink It Down" (Leo Robin and Ralph Rainger) performed by Leonid Kinskey and Bing Crosby, accompanied by the Sons of the Pioneers
- "Arkansas Traveler" (Sanford Faulkner) played when the man is performing the coin trick
- "Love in Bloom" (Ralph Rainger and Leo Robin) performed by Martha Raye
- "One More Ride" (Bob Nolan) performed by the Sons of the Pioneers
- "Memories" (Richard A. Whiting and Friedrich Hollaender) performed drunkenly by Martha Raye
- "The House Jack Built for Jill" (Friedrich Hollaender / Leo Robin) was recorded for the soundtrack, but omitted from the released print.

Bing Crosby recorded some of the songs for Decca Records. "I'm an Old Cowhand", "I Can't Escape from You" and "Empty Saddles" all enjoyed top 10 chart successes. Crosby's songs were included in the Bing's Hollywood series.

== Reception ==
Frank S. Nugent, writing in The New York Times, commented:

"Bing Crosby rides a broncho, milks a wild cow, croons a lullaby to a 2,200-pound Hereford bull and has a box-car romance with a runaway heiress in his new picture at the Paramount. All of which may be interesting and amusing—in fact, it is—but we prefer to think of Rhythm on the Range as our screen introduction to Martha Raye."

Variety's reviewer thought:

"despite the title, the costumes, and the characters, this is no Western. There's very little range, but plenty of rhythm, and the latter makes it pleasant entertainment. Bing Crosby shoots par on singing and light comedy, but because of story handicap, he might have had some tough going minus the aid of a pair of new faces (Raye and Bob Burns), clicking on their first picture attempt ... Best musical sequence, and bringing the picture to a corking climax is a jam fest in the ranch house with Crosby and Miss Raye singing and truckin' to "If You Can't Sing It, You'll Have to Swing It" (Sam Coslow) and "I'm An Old Cowhand" (Johnny Mercer). Miss Raye gets in her hottest licks here. There's also some heated trumpeting by Louis Prima at this time."

Los Angeles Evening Herald Express

"Given a good story at last and the best support that has fallen his way in a long time, Bing Crosby hits his stride again in Rhythm on the Range, the new picture at the Paramount."

Writing for The Spectator in 1936, Graham Greene gave the film a mixed review. Observing that Crosby's character spent the majority of the film nostalgically mourning "Empty saddles in the old corral", which "by its nature [should have been portrayed as] a private emotion", Greene found Crosby's portrayal to "represent permanent, if disagreeable, human characteristics of nostalgia and self-pity". Nevertheless, he summarized the film as "quite a tolerable picture with a few scenes which do deserve to be called popular cinema". Greene also praised Burns' acting as "excellent".

In his 2002 book, Singing in the Saddle, Douglas B. Green summarized Bing Crosby's impact on Western music and the national interest in singing cowboys and the West during the 1930s.

Though born in the West, Harry Lillis Crosby (1903–1977) was anything but a cowboy. Yet, he was one of the most influential performers in the style, for while earnest and sincere Gene Autry was appealing to middle and rural America, the ultrahot Crosby roped in the sophisticates with his frequent performances of Western songs on film, on record, and especially on radio, where he was a national sensation. Though Crosby could deliver a Western song with sincerity—he introduced "Empty Saddles" in Rhythm on the Range and had the true national hit recording of "Home on the Range"—he was at his best when mocking himself. Urbane and hip, he was no cowboy and he knew it, and when he poked fun at his image in a song like "I'm an Old Cowhand (from the Rio Grande)", he was at his most charming. Urbanites appreciated his cool irony and distancing, and yet while they smirked, they could still enjoy the kitschy glamour of the West and the singing cowboy. Although Crosby attracted an audience entirely different from Autry's, both singers contributed enormously to the interest in cowboys, the West, and Western music that permeated the country in the middle 1930s. Though the broad scope of Crosby's career extends far beyond Western music, it is important to acknowledge his impact on the sudden and sustained interest in the singing cowboy during the formative years of the genre. Rhythm on the Range was a big-budget film and exemplified more than any other easily discerned landmark the embrace of the singing cowboy by Hollywood and by popular culture.

== Remake ==
The film was remade as Pardners (1956), starring Dean Martin and Jerry Lewis, which was also directed by Taurog.
