= Little Joe the Wrangler =

Classic American Cowboy Song

"Little Joe the Wrangler" is a classic American cowboy song, written by N. Howard "Jack" Thorp. It appeared in Thorp's 1908 Songs of the Cowboys, which was the first published collection of cowboy songs. The tune comes from the song "Little Old Log Cabin in the Lane" written by Will Hayes in 1871. Members of the Western Writers of America chose it as one of the Top 100 Western songs of all time.

The song is about a solitary runaway who is taken in by a group of cowboys and put to work at a man's job. Little Joe's life ends tragically when his horse suffers a fall during a stampede, crushing the young fellow beneath him. The song has been sung over and over in cow camps for over a century, and has been recorded by many Western singers.

== Performances ==
In the film Destry Rides Again, Marlene Dietrich sings a version with altered lyrics, in which Little Joe is shot by the sheriff. This version is a reference for "Surly Joe", sung by Tim Blake Nelson in the film The Ballad of Buster Scruggs.
