= Belle of the Yukon =

1944 film directed by William A. Seiter

- Theatrical release poster
- Directed by: William A. Seiter
- Screenplay by: James Edward Grant
- Story by: Houston Branch
- Produced by: William A. Seiter
- Starring: Randolph Scott; Gypsy Rose Lee; Dinah Shore; Bob Burns
- Cinematography: Ray Rennahan
- Edited by: Ernest J. Nims
- Production company: International Pictures
- Distributed by: RKO Radio Pictures
- Release date: December 27, 1944
- Running time: 84 minutes
- Country: United States
- Language: English

Belle of the Yukon is a 1944 American comedy musical Western film produced and directed by William A. Seiter and starring Randolph Scott, Gypsy Rose Lee, Dinah Shore and Bob Burns. Based on a story by Houston Branch and set in the days of the great Canadian Gold Rush, the film is about a "reformed" con artist-turned-dance hall owner whose girlfriend, played by Gypsy Rose Lee, tries to keep him on the straight and narrow.

== Plot ==
In a Yukon town called Malemute, a saloon owned by "Honest" John Calhoun gets a new star performer, Belle De Valle, while he is away. A stranger in town, Sam Slade, offers to keep an eye on things until the boss returns, while saloon manager Pop Candless and crooked town marshal Maitland keep a suspicious eye on him.

As soon as Honest John gets back, Belle hits him with a vase. They knew each other in Seattle, where according to Belle, he was actually a con man known as Gentleman Jack who ditched her after becoming wanted by the law for his dishonest ways.

Pop's attractive daughter Lettie is attracted to Steve Atterbury, the piano player. Pop is leery and finds a letter indicating that Steve is already married with children. Steve is ambushed and put on a boat to Nome, giving the impression that he has coldly left Lettie behind.

Honest John is secretly plotting a gold theft. He gains the town's trust and is named bank president. Belle discovers the scheme and starts a run of the bank, making Honest John pay off customers with money he had planned to steal.

Everything turns out for the best, though, because Steve jumps ship and makes it back to Malemute to win Lettie back, helped by the arrival of his sister, Cherie, and their wealthy father, C.V. Atterbury, who vouches that Steve is unmarried and, as a gesture of good faith, places $100,000 in the bank. Honest John promises to actually be honest from now on.

== Cast ==
- Randolph Scott as Honest John Calhoun
- Gypsy Rose Lee as Belle De Valle
- Dinah Shore as Lettie Candless
- Bob Burns as Sam Slade
- Charles Winninger as Pop Candless
- William Marshall as Steve Atterbury
- Guinn "Big Boy" Williams as Sheriff Mervin Maitland
- Robert Armstrong as George
- Florence Bates as Viola Chase
- Victor Kilian as Professor Salsbury
- Wanda McKay as Cherie Atterbury
- Edward Fielding as C.V. Atterbury
- Jane Hale as dance specialty
- Harry Tenbrook as Harry (uncredited)
- Irving Pichel as narrator (uncredited)
- Harrison Greene as stage manager (uncredited)

== Awards ==
In 1946, Belle of the Yukon received Academy Award nominations for Best Original Song and Best Music Scoring.

== Radio adaptation ==
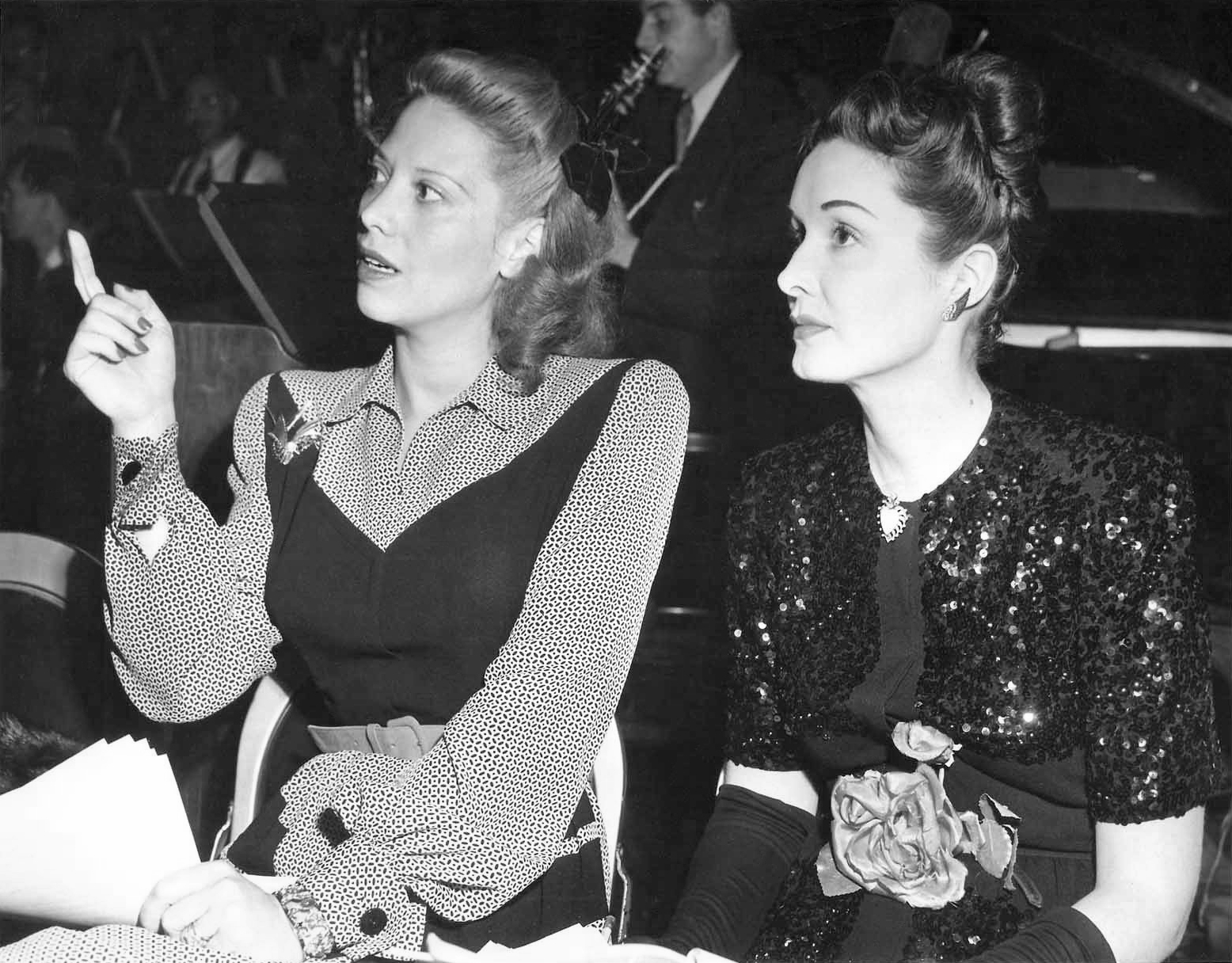
Dinah Shore and Gail Patrick in the CBS Radio studio at a rehearsal for "The Belle of the Yukon" for The Screen Guild Theater (1945)

Belle of the Yukon was presented on Screen Guild Players February 12, 1945. The 30-minute adaptation starred Scott, Shore, Burns and Gail Patrick.

== See also ==
- List of American films of 1944
