= Falset (music) =

Pitch-control of a harmonic of a brass instrument

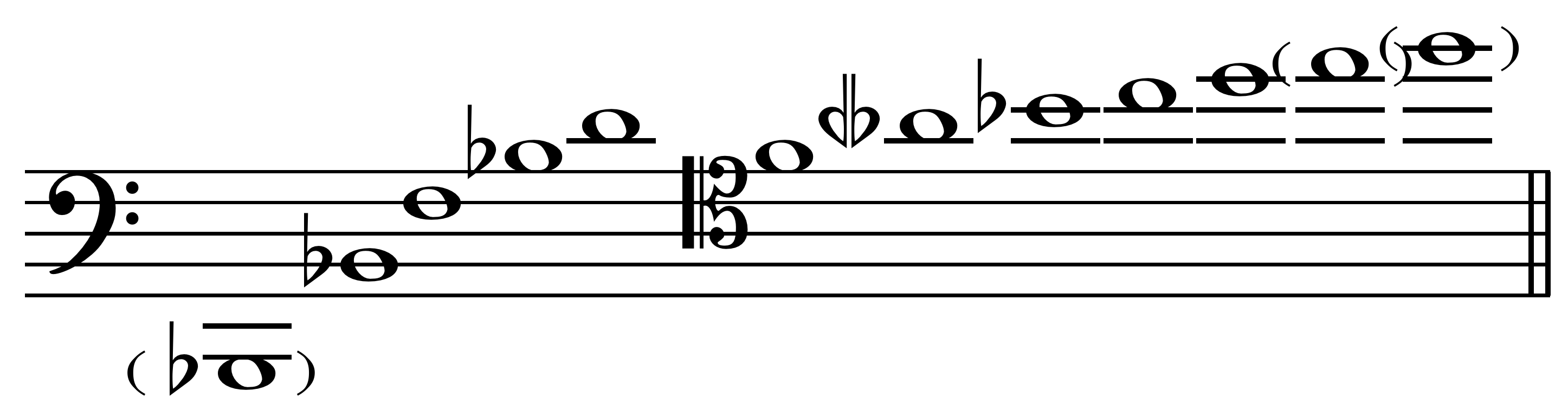
Trombone first position harmonic series, lowest possible note B♭1

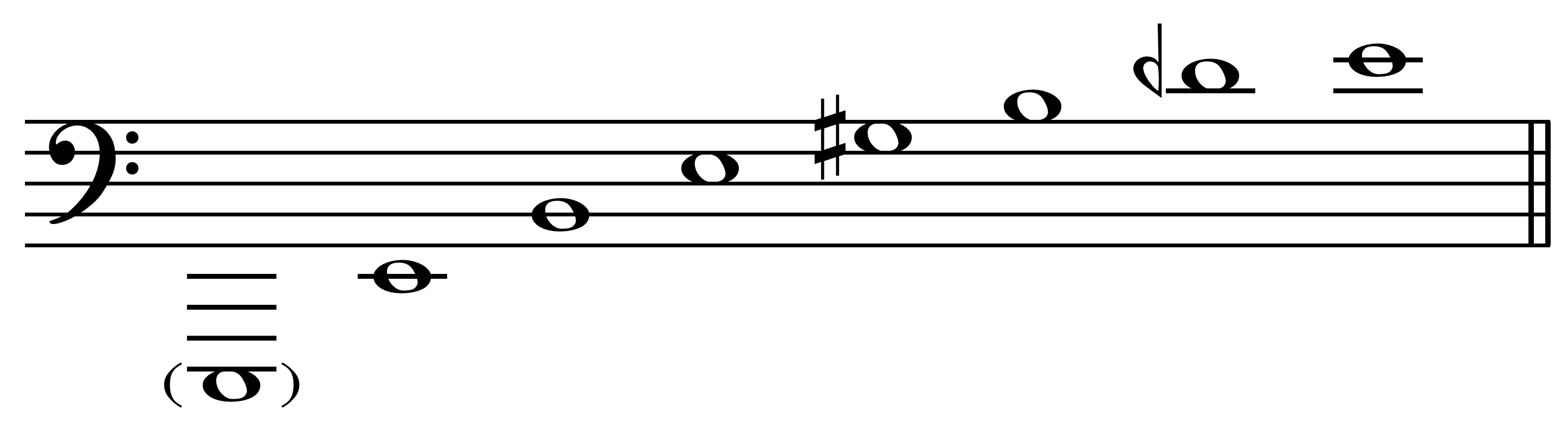
Trombone seventh position harmonic series, lowest possible note E1. Note the gap of theoretically playable notes between E2 and B♭1, which players may fill in with falset tones.

Falset is the latitude for a brasswind player's pitch-control of a harmonic by adjusting lip or air pressure. While only just sufficient in middle and high registers to allow for intonation adjustment, this latitude becomes very wide in the low register in the flattening direction. Without this ability for adjustment, the conventional system of three valves would be problematic owing to the sharpness of certain valve combinations. Previously also falset referred to falsetto.

At B2 the pitch can sometimes be dropped by a fourth or more by means of what is often termed loose-lipping, a slackening of the embouchure which produces factitious pitches not included in the harmonic series. This term dates at least from 1620, when Michael Praetorius wrote about falset tones in articles concerning the cornett and sackbut in his Syntagma Musicum. The technique has been utilized in horn playing from at least the eighteenth century. Works from the Classical period include notes that descend to low G (written in bass clef as G1 in old notation).

Mathematicians and music theorists from Mersenne onward have suggested explanations for these sounds. Recent efforts include a considerably revised view of the structure and genesis of the harmonic series.

On the tenor trombones without F attachments, there is a gap between B♭1 (the fundamental in first position) and E2 (the first overtone / second partial in seventh position). Skilled players can produce falset notes between these, but the sound is relatively weak and not usually used in performance.

All notes emitted from the bazooka are produced purely in falset. Pitches are produced specifically by the player's lips as they vibrate and resonate in conjunction with the mouthpiece but not with the full tube length of the horn as is the case in the trombone.
