= I Can't Escape from You (Bing Crosby song) =

Song by Bing Crosby & The Jimmy Dorsey Orchestra
- Language: English
- Released: 1936
- Recorded: July 17, 1936
- Genre: Jazz
- Songwriters: Leo Robin; Richard A. Whiting

"I Can't Escape from You" is a song written music by Richard A. Whiting and lyrics by Leo Robin for the 1936 Paramount Film "Rhythm on the Range", and first introduced in the film when Bing Crosby sang it to Frances Farmer. Crosby recorded it for Decca Records that same year with the Jimmy Dorsey Orchestra and it was in the hit parade for 11 weeks reaching a peak position of No. 7. Crosby recorded the song again in 1954 for his album Bing: A Musical Autobiography.

== Other notable recordings ==
- 1936 Bunny Berigan and the Rhythm Makers (vocal: Peggy Lawson) recorded July 20, 1936.
- 1936 Erskine Hawkins and his 'Bama State Collegians - recorded for Vocalion on July 20, 1936 (catalog No. 3280).
- 1936 Eddy Duchin and His Orchestra (vocal: Jerry Cooper) - recorded for Victor on May 29, 1936, catalog 25347.
- 1936 Jimmie Lunceford and His Orchestra - recorded for Decca October 14, 1936.
- 1944 Benny Carter and His Orchestra - recorded May 21, 1944 for Capitol (40048).
- 1945 Artie Shaw recorded July 28, 1945 for RCA.
- 1946 Bunk Johnson - recorded for a V-Disc.
- 1947 Erroll Garner - recorded April 22, 1947 for RCA (20-4723).
- 1951 The Dominoes
- 1957 Carmen McRae - for her 1957 album After Glow.
- 1958 Johnnie Ray with the Billy Taylor Trio for the 1958 album Til Morning.
- 1994 Mel Tormé - for the 1994 album A Tribute to Bing Crosby
