= John White (singer) =

American singer

John I. White (April 12, 1902 – November 26, 1992) was a western music singer. He was born in 1902 and originated from Washington, DC. Working under various stage names, such as the Lone Star Ranger, the Lonesome Cowboy, and most often Whitey Johns he flourished as a performing and recording artist in the 1920s and 1930s. His first recordings were for the American Record Corporation and were released on a wide variety of record labels. He performed several covers of songs originally recorded by Vernon Dalhart. His most famous recordings were two of his last, "Whoopee Ti Yo Yo, Git Along Dogies" and "The Strawberry Roan" issued under his proper name, John White.

After his musical career he pursued a career in business until his retirement in 1965. During his retirement he researched into American western music and the lives of the genre's composers. He also became a writer, contributing articles about cowboys to several magazines and publishing a book entitled "Git Along Little Dogies; Songs And Songmakers of the American West" (Urbana :University of Illinois Press, 1975.)
