= Bob Burns (humorist) =

American musical comedian (1890–1956)

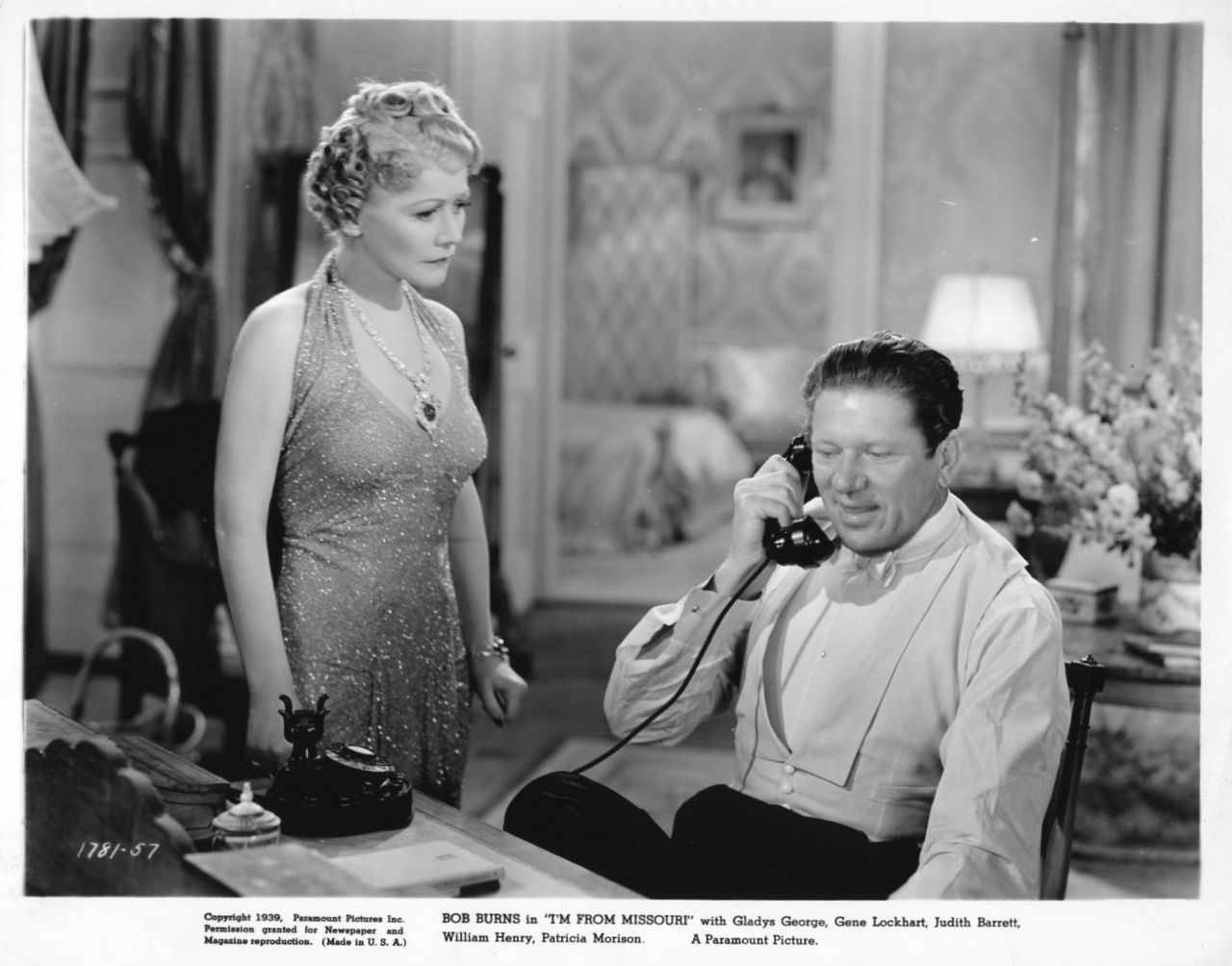
- Gladys George and Bob Burns in I'm from Missouri, 1939
- Born: Robin Burn; August 2, 1890; Greenwood, Arkansas, U.S.
- Died: February 2, 1956 (aged 65); Encino, California, U.S.
- Occupations: Film, radio, actor, comedian
- Years active: 1930–1945
- Spouses: Elizabeth Fisher (m. 1921; died 1936) Harriet M. Foster (m. 1939)
- Children: 4
- Musical career
- Instrument: Bazooka

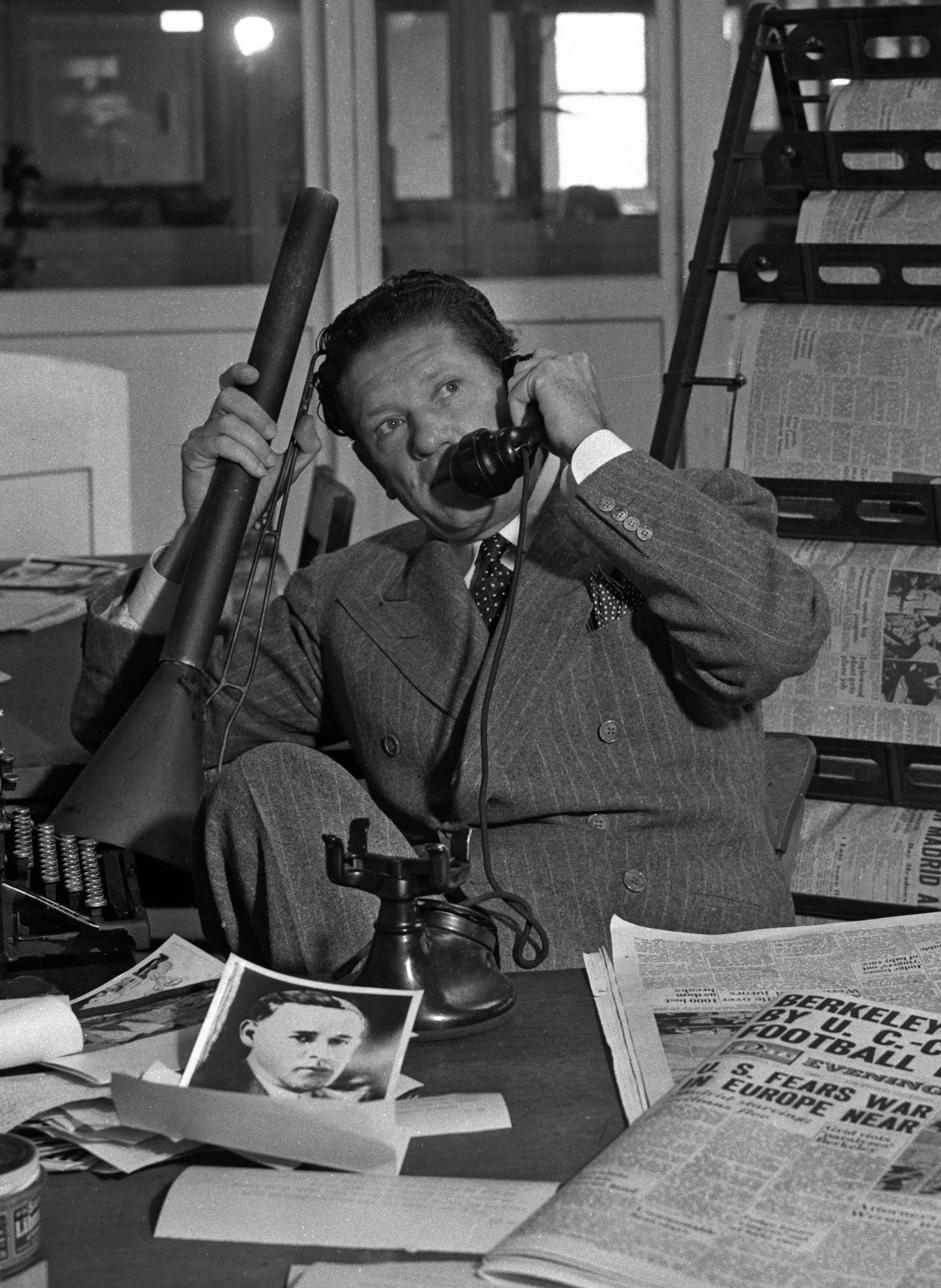
Bob Burns sitting at his desk holding his bazooka

Robin "Bob" Burns (birth name Burn; August 2, 1890 – February 2, 1956) was an American musical comedian, who appeared on radio and in movies from 1930 to 1947.

Burns played a novelty musical instrument of his own invention, which he called a "bazooka". During World War II, the U.S. Army's handheld anti-tank rocket launcher was nicknamed "bazooka" after Burns's instrument, and the term remains current into the 21st century as a generic name for some shoulder-fired rocket launchers.

== Early years ==
He was born Robin Burn in Greenwood, Arkansas. When he was three years old, his family moved to Van Buren, Arkansas. As a boy, Burns played trombone and cornet in the town's "Queen City Silver Cornet Band". At 13, he formed his own string band. Practicing in the back of Hayman's Plumbing Shop one night, he picked up a length of gas pipe and blew into it, creating an unusual sound. With modifications, this became a musical instrument he named a "bazooka" (after "bazoo", meaning a windy fellow, from the Dutch bazuin for "trumpet"). A photograph shows him playing his invention in the Silver Cornet Band. Functioning like a crude trombone, the musical bazooka had a narrow range, but this was intentional.

Burns also studied civil engineering and worked as a peanut farmer, but by 1911 was primarily an entertainer.

During World War I Burns enlisted in the United States Marine Corps. He sailed to France with the 11th Marine Regiment. As a sergeant, he became the leader of the Marine Corps' jazz band in Europe. Burns made another "bazooka" from stove pipes and a whiskey funnel, which he sometimes played with the Corps band. In September 1919, he and his "Marine Corps Melody Six" jazz band, with Burn playing his bazooka, were attached to the Marine Corps Recruiting Station in Manhattan.

== The Arkansas Traveler ==
After the war, Burns returned to the stage, often playing the bazooka as part of his act. He used it as a prop when telling hillbilly stories and jokes. Burns became known as "The Arkansas Traveler" and "The Arkansas Philosopher". His stage persona was a self-effacing, rustic bumpkin with amusing stories about "the kinfolks" back home in Van Buren. His character was patterned after Sandford C. Faulkner (1803–1874), composer of the popular fiddle tune, "The Arkansas Traveler". A caricature of Burns on the cover of the book The Arkansas Traveler appears in the Looney Tunes cartoon "Book Revue" (1945). Two other Warner Bros. cartoons of the 1930s, 1937's "Speaking of the Weather" and 1938's "The Major Lied 'Till Dawn," both directed by Frank Tashlin, refer to Burns; in the first cartoon, Burns is depicted playing the bazooka and then referring to Uncle Fud, and in the second cartoon, a map of Van Buren, Arkansas is seen.

== Radio career ==
In 1930, Burns auditioned for a major Los Angeles radio station. He had prepared a 10-minute performance, but was asked to do 30 minutes, which he filled out with improvised stories and bazooka tunes. The managers did not care for his prepared material, but were impressed by his improvised material. Burns was hired. He appeared on an afternoon show, "The Fun Factory", as a character called "Soda Pop".

In 1935, on a visit to New York City, Burns asked bandleader and radio star Paul Whiteman for an audition. Whiteman put Burns on his nightly show, the Kraft Music Hall, which was broadcast nationally; Burns was a big hit. Burns also became a regular on Rudy Vallée's show The Fleischmann's Yeast Hour.

Burns returned to Los Angeles in 1936, where Kraft Music Hall was now hosted by Bing Crosby. Burns was a regular, playing the bazooka and telling tall tales about his fictional hillbilly relatives, Uncle Fud and Aunt Doody.

Bob Burns was the host of the 10th Academy Awards held on March 10, 1938, at the Biltmore Hotel in Los Angeles, California. Originally scheduled to be held on March 3, 1938, the ceremony was postponed due to heavy flooding in Los Angeles.

In 1941, Burns was given his own radio show, called The Arkansas Traveler (1941–1943) and The Bob Burns Show (1943–1947).

== Newspaper column ==
From 1936 to 1940, Burns wrote a newspaper column, "Well, I'll Tell You," a column filler with brief homespun anecdotes. The daily feature was syndicated to 240 newspapers.

== Film career ==
In 1930, Burns appeared briefly in the film Up the River playing the bazooka in blackface for a prison vaudeville show. Over the next five years, he appeared in 10 movies, either uncredited or in a minor role, usually playing the bazooka.

After his national radio breakthrough in 1935–1936, Burns moved up to feature roles as a contract player with Paramount Pictures. In Rhythm on the Range (1936) he was second lead with Crosby. He appeared in eleven more films in 1936 to 1940, including eight starring roles. Most of these were comedies, but he also played a crusading lawyer in the drama Our Leading Citizen (1939). He also appeared on the December 4, 1939 Lux Radio Theatre one-hour adaptation of A Man to Remember, taking Edward Ellis's film role as a humane small-town doctor battling the townspeople's greed.

In 1941, Burns broke with Paramount, rather than appear in a proposed film which he thought was excessively demeaning to "the people of his native hills".

In 1944, Burns appeared in the Technicolor musical Western film Belle of the Yukon (1944), set in the Canadian Gold Rush. Burns was top-billed with Randolph Scott, Gypsy Rose Lee and Dinah Shore. His last appearance was as co-star in The Windjammer (1945), which he helped write.

His last performance was on January 30, 1955, on The Ed Sullivan Show (then called Toast of the Town).

For his contributions to the film industry, Burns was inducted posthumously into the Hollywood Walk of Fame in 1960 with a motion pictures star located at 1601 Vine Street.

== Personal life ==
In 1921, Burns married Elizabeth Anna Fisher. They had one child, Robert Jr., who was married to actress Naomi Stevens and who died in 2012. Elizabeth died in 1936. Burns then married his long-time secretary Harriet M. Foster in May 1939. They had three children, Barbara, William, and Stephen, and remained married until his death.

A wealthy man from his land investments, Burns spent his final years on his 200-acre (81 ha) model farm on Sherman Way in Canoga Park, in the San Fernando Valley of Los Angeles, California.

He died from kidney cancer in nearby Encino on February 2, 1956, at the age of 65.

== Filmography ==
Year	Title	Role	Notes
1930	Up the River	Slim - Bazooka Player	Uncredited
1931	Not Exactly Gentlemen	Newspaper Printer	Uncredited
1931	Quick Millions	'Arkansas' Smith	(as Robert Burns)
1931	Young as You Feel	Colorado Detective	Uncredited
1931	Heaven on Earth	Marty	Uncredited
1932	If I Had a Million	Marine Sergeant	Uncredited
1932	Tombstone Canyon	Sheriff Mort Langly	Uncredited
1933	Laughter in Hell	Sheriff with Posse	Uncredited
1933	Fast Workers	Alabam	
1933	Hoop-La	Barker	Uncredited
1934	Spitfire	Mountaineer	Uncredited
1934	Lazy River	Slim - Prisoner	Uncredited
1936	Rhythm on the Range	Buck Eaton	
1936	The Big Broadcast of 1937	Bob Black	
1937	Waikiki Wedding	Shad Buggle	
1937	Mountain Music	Bob Burnside	
1937	Wells Fargo	Hank York - a Wanderer	
1938	Radio City Revels	Lester Robin	
1938	Tropic Holiday	Breck Jones	
1938	The Arkansas Traveler	The Arkansas Traveler	
1939	I'm from Missouri	Sweeney Bliss	
1939	Our Leading Citizen	Lem Schofield	(said to be his favorite role, his only serious one)
1940	Alias the Deacon	Deke Caswell	
1940	Comin' Round the Mountain	Jed Blower	
1944	Belle of the Yukon	Sam Slade	
1945	The Windjammer	Himself	(final film role)

== See also ==
- Bob Burns House, his childhood home in Van Buren, Arkansas
