= Bazooka (instrument) =

Musical instrument

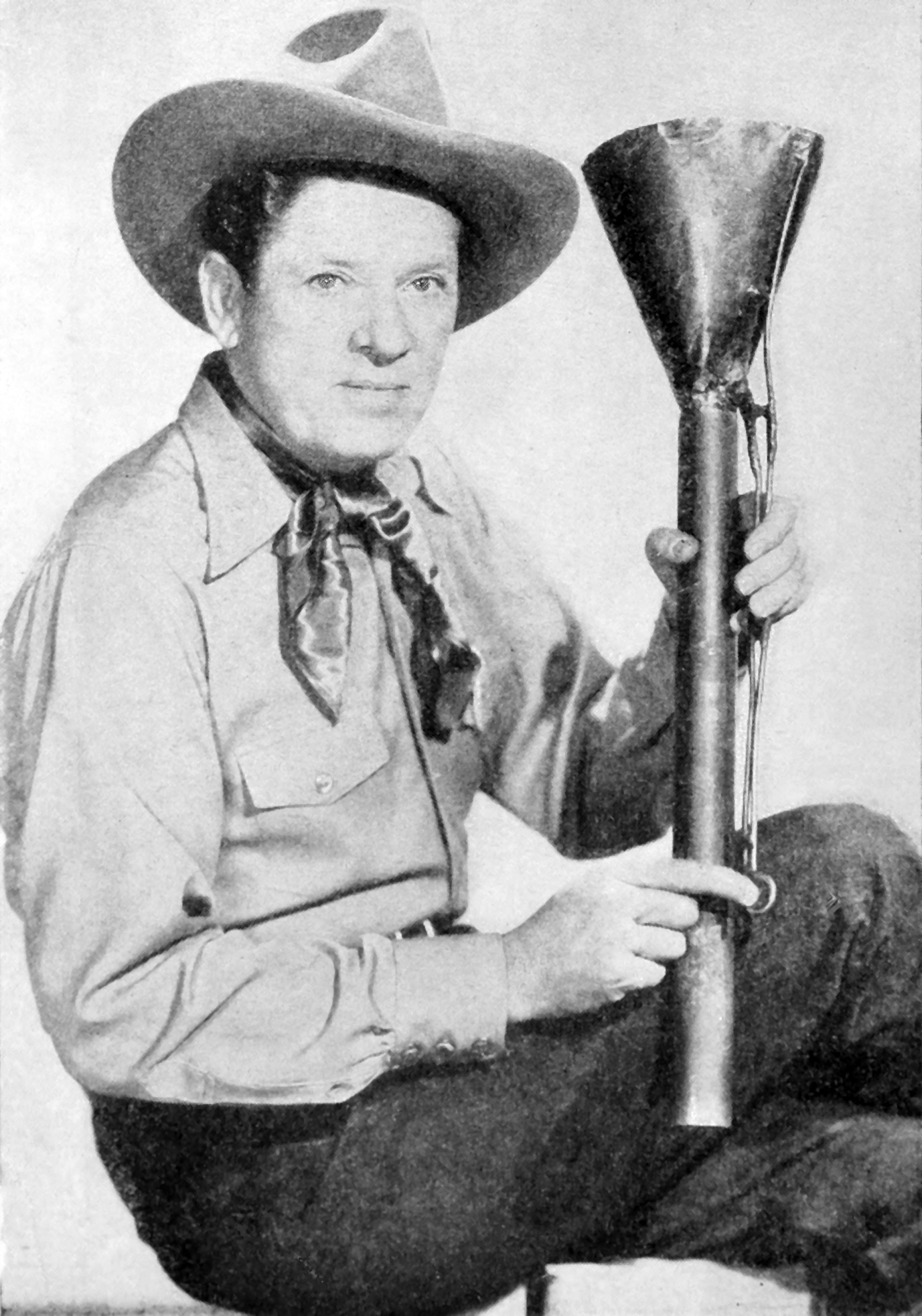
- Bob Burns with a bazooka, the instrument he invented

Brass instrument
- Classification: Wind; Brass; Aerophone
- Hornbostel–Sachs classification: 423.22 (Sliding aerophone sounded by lip movement)

The bazooka is a brass musical instrument several feet in length which incorporates telescopic tubing like the trombone. Radio comedian Bob Burns is credited with inventing the instrument in the 1910s, and popularized it in the 1930s. It was also played by jazz musicians Noon Johnson and Sanford Kendrick.

== Name ==
The name "bazooka" comes from an extension of the word "bazoo", which is slang for "mouth" or "boastful talk", and which ultimately probably stems from Dutch bazuin (buisine, a medieval trumpet). The name appears in the 1909 novel The Swoop, or How Clarence Saved England by P. G. Wodehouse.

During World War II, the United States Army's new M1 anti-tank weapon, a man-portable recoilless anti-tank rocket launcher, rapidly became universally known by its nickname the "bazooka" because of its resemblance to this musical instrument.

== Instrument ==
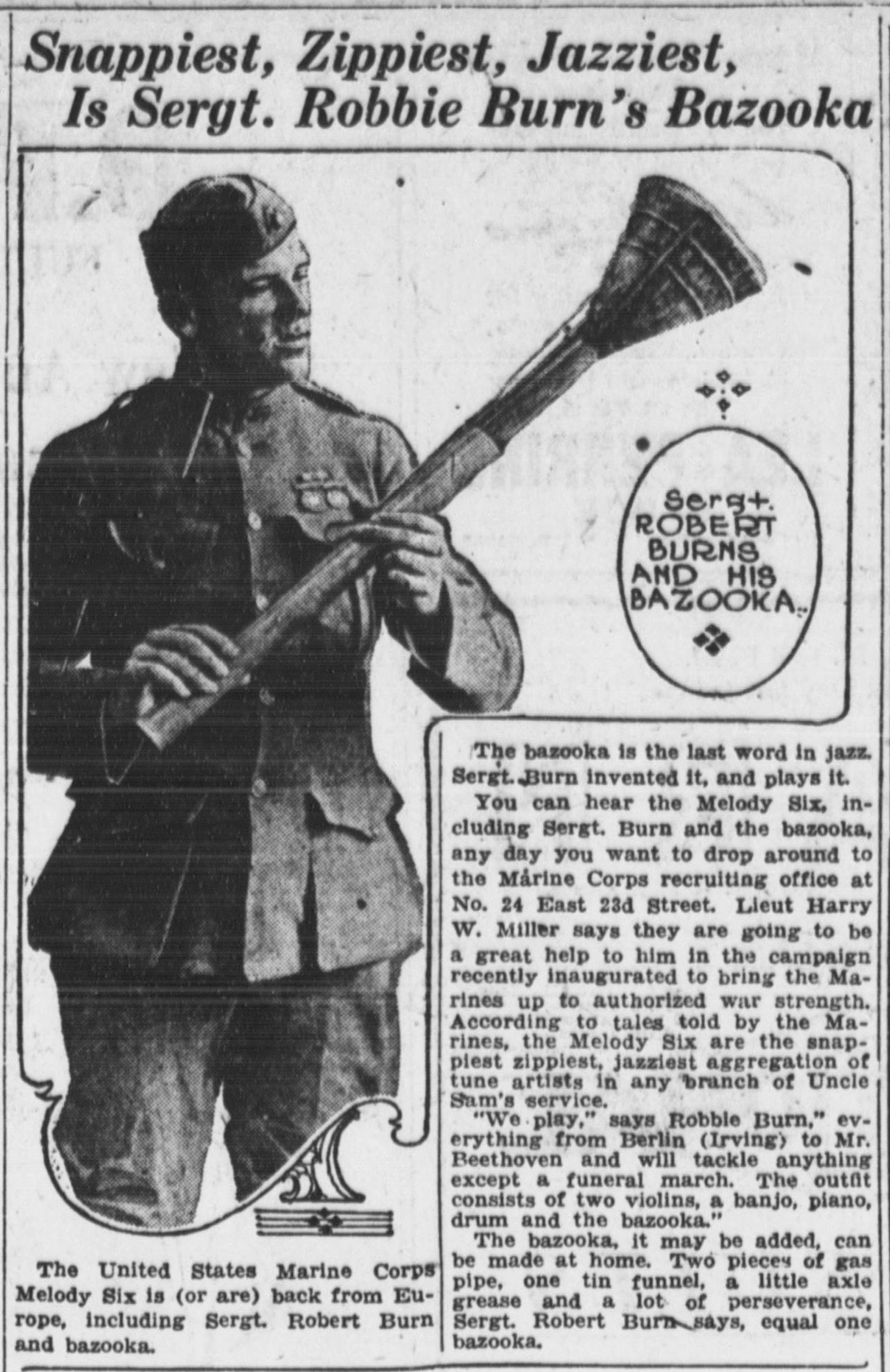
"Robbie Burn's Bazooka" in The Evening World, New York, September 3, 1919

From its start within a lipreed mouthpiece – which may consist of nothing but the bare tube or may employ a mouthpiece which is handmade to emulate one from a low brass instrument – the air column expands into a length of large-diameter pipe that slides freely around a length of narrower-diameter pipe, which, in turn, terminates in a widely flaring bell.

Although the slide action of the bazooka appears as if it would alter the pitch in the same way as the slide of a trombone, this is not the case, due to the extremely wide diameter of the bazooka's tubing relative to its length. Manipulating the horn's length changes only the tone quality, as subtle harmonic overtones fluctuate. This effect gives the bazooka its characteristic warbling, echoing sound.

All of the bazooka's notes are produced purely in falset. In other words, the player's lips produce pitches as they vibrate on the bare pipe end (or on the optional mouthpiece and leadpipe unit), but the pitches produced by the lips cannot generate a standing-wave vibration of the air inside such a wide tube. Therefore, unlike the trombone, the remainder of the bazooka works mainly as a megaphone to amplify the volume of the sound.

It can be seen being played by Bob Burns in the 1936 movie Rhythm on the Range during the song "I'm an Old Cowhand".
