= Western music (North America) =

Form of music

- Stylistic origins: American folk; ranchera; singing cowboys; Tejano
- Cultural origins: Western United States
- Derivative forms: Red Dirt; New Mexico; Texas country; Tejano; Western swing

Regional scenes
- Western United States; West South Central states; Southwestern United States; Southern United States

Western music, also known as Cowboy music or simply western, is a form of music composed by and about the people who settled and worked throughout the Western United States and Western Canada. Western music celebrates the lifestyle of the cowboy on the open range, along the Rocky Mountains, and among the prairies of Western North America. The genre grew from the mix of cultural influences in the American frontier and what became the Southwestern United States at the time, it came from the folk music traditions of those living the region, those being the hillbilly music from those that arrived from the Eastern U.S., the corrido and ranchera from Northern Mexico, and the New Mexico and Tejano endemic to the Southwest. The music industry of the mid-20th century grouped the western genre with that of similar folk origins, instrumentation and rural themes, to create the banner of country and western music, which was simplified in time to country music.

== Characteristics ==
Western music covers an array of styles and experiences that reflect the various communities that were present along the 19th century U.S frontier. Some songs were developed by cowboys working on isolated cattle ranches. The mundane, lonely life on the ranches gave way to musical expression and cowboys would often make use of repurposed folk and popular songs to further convey their lifestyle through music. In addition to portraying life on the cattle ranches and trails, the genre of western music also encompasses songs about Texas Rangers, pioneers, outlaws, Native Americans, nature, Mexican/American experiences, and miners rushing for gold.

Otto Gray, an early cowboy band leader, stated authentic western music had only three rhythms, all coming from the gaits of the cow pony: walk, trot, and lope. Gray also noted the uniqueness of this spontaneous American song product, and the freedom of expression of the singers.

The choruses of cowboy songs often contained various cries, whoops, and yells that were infused with lyrics. These calls reflected the solitude of cowboys on the ranch and were said to have a calming effect on the restless cattle under their watch; songs with this vocal characteristic were referred to as "dogie songs."

In addition to taking rhythmic inspiration from the movement of horses, multiple cowboy songs like "Home on the Range" and "The Strawberry Roan" made use of a three-quarter time signature. The more waltz-like nature of these songs differs from the actual rhythms found in cowboy life, and instead, works to embellish the sentimental, humorous, and mythologized nature of popular frontier stories. Oftentimes, such influences derived from older European folk songs and traditions.

Accordions brought to North America by German and Bohemian immigrants were utilized by Mexican musicians to adapt waltzes and polkas into a style of dance music associated with the Old West. Other instruments that would have been used on the frontier and incorporated into western music include the fiddle, harmonica, banjo, guitar, and mandolin.

== Origins ==
Western music is said to be influenced by the folk music traditions of England, Wales, Scotland, and Ireland, and cowboy songs sung around campfires in the 19th century, such as "Streets of Laredo", can be traced back to European folk songs.

Additionally, western music was impacted by the blues, among other African-American folk traditions. Cowboy songs and the rural, early iteration of the blues emerged around the same time and influenced each other as they developed. A significant figure who characterized the convergence of both musical traditions was Huddie "Leadbelly" Ledbetter, born in 1888 along the Texas/Louisiana border. Conventionally described as a songwriter who wrote blues and Western music, Leadbelly was associated with the African-American cowboys in eastern Texas. They impacted the genre by introducing a three-chord ballad song structure, and reflected their personal hardships in their lyrics.

Reflecting the realities of the open range and ranch houses where the music originated, and the earliest cowboy bands were often string bands supplemented occasionally with a handheld free reed aerophone. The harmonica, invented in the early 19th century in central Europe, arrived in North America shortly before the American Civil War; its small size and portability made it a favorite among the American public and the flood of pioneers heading westward, while squeezeboxes (such as the concertina and accordion) also enjoyed popularity in the Old West, moreso than guitars according to folk singer Peter Bellamy.

In 1908, N. Howard "Jack" Thorp published the first book of western music, titled Songs of the Cowboys. Containing only lyrics and no musical notation, the book was very popular west of the Mississippi River. Most of these cowboy songs are of unknown authorship, but among the best known is "Little Joe the Wrangler" written by Thorp himself.

In 1910, John Lomax, in his book Cowboy Songs and Other Frontier Ballads, first gained national attention for western music. His book contained some of the same songs as Thorp's book, although in variant versions (most had been collected before Thorp's book was published). Lomax's compilation included many musical scores. Lomax published a second collection in 1919 titled Songs of the Cattle Trail and Cow Camp.

The first successful cowboy band to tour the East was Otto Gray's Oklahoma Cowboys, put together by William McGinty, an Oklahoma pioneer and former Rough Rider. The band appeared on radio and toured the vaudeville circuit from 1924 through 1936. They recorded few songs, however, so are overlooked by many scholars of western music.

Various musicians recorded western songs in the 1920s and early 1930s, including Carl T. Sprague, John I. White, Jules Verne Allen, Harry McClintock, Tex Owens, and Wilf Carter alias Montana Slim. Many of these early western singers had grown up on ranches and farms or had experience working as cowboys. They typically performed simple arrangements with rustic vocal performances and a simple guitar or fiddle accompaniment.

== Mainstream popularity ==
Throughout the 1930s and 1940s, western music became widely popular through the romanticization of the cowboy and idealized depictions of the west in Hollywood films. Singing cowboys, such as Gene Autry and Roy Rogers, sang cowboy songs in their films and became popular throughout the United States. Film producers began incorporating fully orchestrated four-part harmonies and sophisticated musical arrangements into their motion pictures. Bing Crosby, the most popular singer of that time, recorded numerous cowboy and western songs and starred in the western musical film Rhythm on the Range (1936). During this era, the most popular recordings and musical radio shows included western music. Western swing also developed during this time.

== Decline in popularity/1950s–1970s ==
The Western Writers of America was formed in 1953 to promote excellence in western-style writing, including songwriting. In the late 1950s, Frankie Laine recorded TV drama Theme "Rawhide".

In 1964, the Country & Western Music Academy was formed in an effort to promote western music. The Academy was formed in response to the Nashville-oriented Country Music Association that had formed in 1958. The Academy's first awards were largely dominated by Bakersfield-based artists such as Buck Owens. Over time, the Academy evolved into the Academy of Country Music and its mission is no longer distinguished from other country music organizations.

By the 1960s, the popularity of western music was in decline. Though western television series were at an all-time peak in popularity, other than a handful of theme songs, this did not buoy the western music genre as a whole. Popular western recording artists sold fewer albums and attracted smaller audiences. Rock and roll dominated music sales and Hollywood recording studios dropped most of their western artists (a few artists did successfully cross between the two, most prominently Johnny Cash, whose breakthrough hit "Folsom Prison Blues" (1955, live in 1968) combined a western theme with a rock-and-roll arrangement). In addition, the Nashville sound, based more on pop ballads than on folk music, came to dominate the country and western commercial sales; except for the label, much of the music was indistinguishable from rock and roll or popular classes of music. Country and western were among many genres whose popularity was drowned out by the British Invasion.

The resulting backlash from western music purists led to the development of country music styles much more influenced by western music, including the Bakersfield sound and outlaw country. The seminal compilation album Wanted! The Outlaws carried a Western theme and songs sung by Willie Nelson, Waylon Jennings, Jennings's wife Jessi Colter, and Tompall Glaser, revitalizing the image of western themes in popular music.

== Cowboy pop ==
Authors such as Barry Mazor, Richard Carlin and John T. Davis have used the term cowboy pop to describe the music of cowboy singers in western films. Jimmy Wakely, for example, was described by Mazor as a cowboy pop singer, and he has written that "when singing cowboy movies ruled, Hollywood hardly made a distinction between the sounds of cowboy pop balladeers and another sound entirely, born in Texas, in which Jimmie Rodgers had a formative role." Several writers have emphasized that historically country music and cowboy music were not considered the same genre; for example, in her essay "Cowboy Songs", Anne Dingus wrote that "cowboy music is not country music, though the two are often lumped together as 'country and western'." In 1910, John Avery Lomax anthologized over a hundred cowboy songs in his collection Cowboy Songs and Other Frontier Ballads.

== Rediscovery ==
Older western music is widely streamed on major platforms, with music by Marty Robbins and Al Hurricane being more easily accessible. Newer takes on western music are constantly written and recorded and performed all across the American West and Western Canada, thanks to the popularity of New Mexico music within New Mexico and the success of Michael Martin Murphey throughout the western scene, they have resurrected the cowboy song genre, promoting western singers, Route 66 rockabilly, and cowboy poets. The style has even seen a popularity resurgence globally, thanks to the western genre's new-found popularity on streaming services and video games.

The Western Music Association was established in 1989 to preserve and promote western music. Western music in video games can be traced back to The Oregon Trail series, early Nintendo title Sheriff/Bandido, and arcade games like Sunset Riders. Fallout: New Vegas relies on an atmospheric western music style, but it also features old mid-20th century popular western musicians such as Marty Robbins along with pop music of the day. Furthermore, the Red Dead series of games heavily features western music, since it takes place in an Old West setting. Bill Elm and Woody Jackson's modern spin on an Old West game would not be complete without their carefully assembled score; what they call their best project to date Independent video games SteamWorld and Gunman Clive also make use of western music, as do other larger productions such as Dillon's Rolling Western.

The contributions of Chris LeDoux were also key in the expanded growth of Western music because of his work in the cowboy song genre in the 1990s and early 2000s. LeDoux was a PRCA World Champion in bareback riding who composed songs about personal experiences in the rodeo and ranch cowboy lifestyles. LeDoux exploded in popularity in 1992 when he dueted with country artist Garth Brooks in their Grammy nominated hit, "Whatcha Gonna Do with a Cowboy". His newfound popularity allowed LeDoux to introduce millions of newcomers to the Western genre, a style of music that had previously existed for many years before him.

The music of Colter Wall is a part of this revival.

== List of western music songs ==
- "Abilene"
- "Along the Navaho Trail"
- "Along the Santa Fe Trail"
- "Back in the Saddle Again"
- "Ballad of the Alamo"
- "Bonanza"
- "Buenas Tardes Amigo"
- "Big Iron"
- "Billy the Kid"
- "Blue Shadows on the Trail"
- "Blue Prairie"
- "Buffalo Gals (Won't You Come Out Tonight?)"
- "Bury Me Not on the Lone Prairie"
- "Call of the Canyon"
- "Carry Me Back to the Lone Prairie"
- "The Cattle Call"
- "Cheyenne"
- "Cimarron (Roll On)"
- "Cocaine Blues"
- "Cool Water"
- "Cow-Cow Boogie (Cuma-Ti-Yi-Yi-Ay)"
- "The Cowboy's Life"
- "Coyotes"
- "Oh My Darling, Clementine"
- "Deep in the Heart of Texas"
- "Desperado"
- "Don't Fence Me In"
- "Don't Take Your Guns to Town"
- "El Paso"
- "El Paso City"
- "Ghost Riders in the Sky (A Cowboy Legend)"
- "Git Along, Little Dogies"
- "Halfway to Montana"
- "The Hills of Old Wyoming"
- "Happy Trails"
- "Heroes and Villains"
- "Hold on Little Dogies"
- "Home on the Range"
- "I'm an Old Cowhand (From the Rio Grande)"
- "I Ride an Old Paint"
- "I Want to Be a Cowboy's Sweetheart"
- "Jim", a lament about a cowboy whose friend has died at an early age
- "Jingle Jangle Jingle (I Got Spurs)"
- "Little Joe the Wrangler"
- "The Last Roundup"
- "The Lone Star Trail"
- "The Lonesome Rider"
- "Man Walks Among Us"
- "The Masters Call"
- "Me and My Uncle"
- "Muleskinner Blues"
- "Night Rider's Lament"
- "Oh! Susanna"
- "The Old Chisholm Trail"
- "On the Trail of the Buffalo", also known as "The Buffalo Skinners" or "The Hills of Mexico"
- "The Oregon Trail"
- "Pistol Packin' Mama"
- "Rawhide"
- "Red River Valley"
- "Red Wing"
- "Rocky Mountain Express"
- "Rogue River Valley"
- "San Antonio Rose"
- "Sioux City Sue"
- "Song of the Sierras"
- "The Strawberry Roan"
- "Streets Of Laredo"
- "Sweet Betsy from Pike"
- "Texas Plains"
- "Texas Rangers", about an ill-fated unit of Texas Rangers, headed to the Rio Grande, whose "time had come to die"
- "Tumbling Tumbleweeds"
- "Utah Carol"
- "The Wayward Wind"
- "When the Cactus Is in Bloom"
- "The Yellow Rose of Texas"
- "Young Wesley"

== Bibliography ==
- Cannon, Hal. Old Time Cowboy Songs. Gibbs Smith. ISBN 0-87905-308-9
- Green, Douglas B. Singing in the Saddle: The History of the Singing Cowboy. Vanderbilt University Press, August 2002. ISBN 0-8265-1412-X
- Hull, Myra. "Cowboy Ballads".
- Johnson, Thomas S. "That Ain't Country: The Distinctiveness of Commercial Western Music". JEMF Quarterly. Vol 17, No. 62, Summer, 1981. pp 75–84.
- Lomax, John A., M.A. Cowboy Songs and Other Frontier Ballads. The MacMillan Company, 1918. Online edition (pdf)
- O'Neal, Bill; Goodwin, Fred. The Sons of the Pioneers. Eakin Press, 2001. ISBN 1-57168-644-4
- Otto Gray and his Oklahoma Cowboys. Early Cowboy Band. British Archive of Country Music, 2006. CD D 139
- Quay, Sara E. Westward Expansion. Greenwood Press, 2000. ISBN 0-313-31235-4
- Shirley, Glenn. "Daddy of the Cowboy Bands". Oklahoma Today (Fall 1959), 9:4 6-7, 29.
- Thorp, N. Howard "Jack". Songs of the Cowboys. Houghton Mifflin Company, 1908, 1921.
- White, John I. Git Along Little Dogies: Songs and Songmakers of the American West. (Music in American Life) series, University of Illinois Press, 1989 reprint. ISBN 0-252-06070-9
