= Carl T. Sprague =

American singer

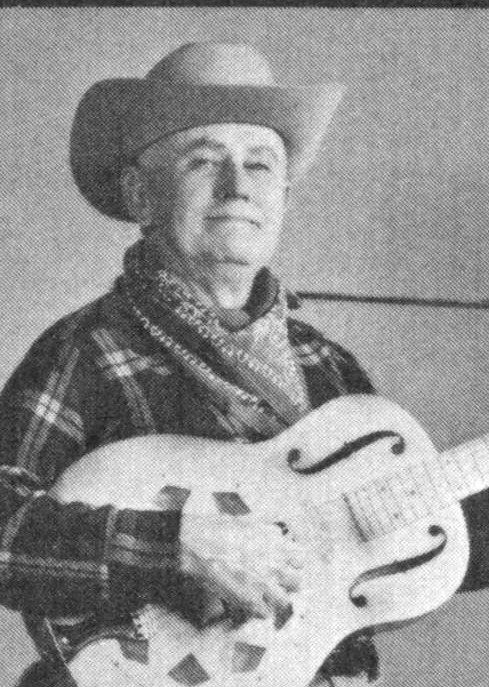
- Carl T. Sprague in the 1960s

Background information
- Birth name: Carl Tyler Sprague
- Born: May 10, 1896
- Died: Feb 21, 1979

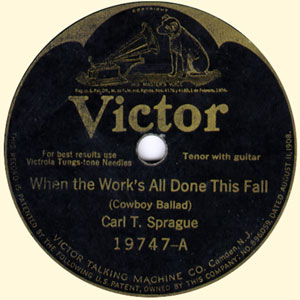
The song "When The Work's All Done This Fall" by Carl T. Sprague.

Carl Tyler "Doc" Sprague (May 10, 1896 – February 21, 1979) was an American country musician. He was often dubbed "The Original Singing Cowboy". Sprague was one of the first country musicians on record, recording in 1925.

== Biography ==
He was born in Manvel, Texas, United States. Sprague grew up on a farm near Houston, Texas and learned traditional cowboy songs as a child. During his college years at Texas A&M, he played in a band and, later on, worked as an athletic trainer. He also found time to conduct a weekly radio program on campus. Sprague served in World War I. Sprague served in the U.S. Army Signal Corps. He graduated from college in 1922 and was offered occasional work performing on radio. He received a recording contract by Victor in 1925. In August, the same year, he went to Camden, New Jersey to record his first ten songs. His debut sides were "When the Work's All Done This Fall" and "Bad Companions"; the former would go on to sell over 900,000 copies. His recording of "The Dying Cowboy" became a hit in 1926. Other successful recordings were "The Mormon Cowboy," "The Boston Burglar" and "The Two Soldiers." He recorded with Victor until 1929, releasing 33 songs. In the 1930s he moved to Bryan, Texas and ceased recording, though he would return to play folk festivals during the genre's resurgence in the 1950s and 1960s.

He died in 1979 in Bryan, Texas.
