= Favorite Hawaiian Songs =

Decca Presents Bing Crosby In An Album of Favorite Hawaiian Songs
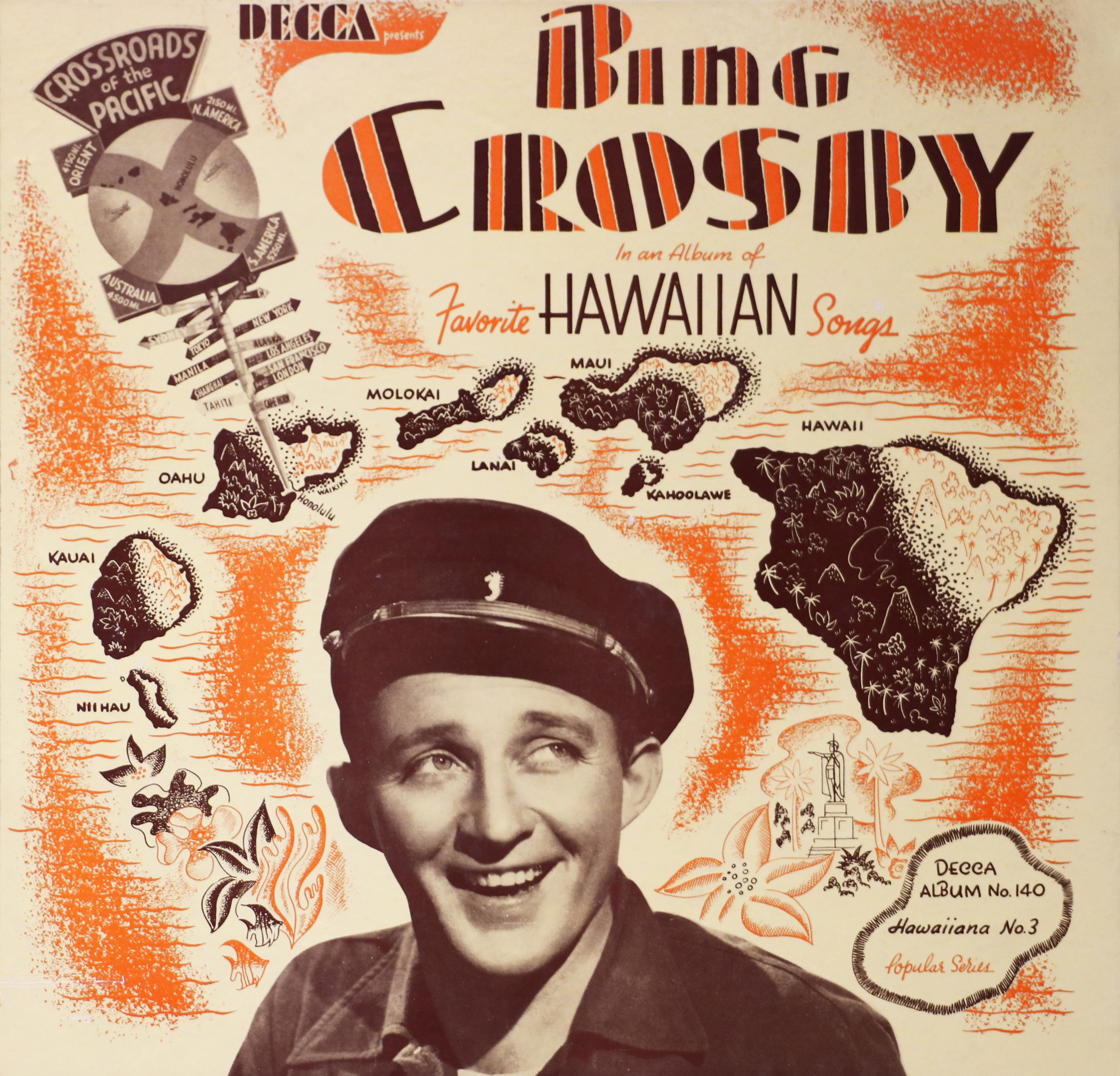

Compilation album by Bing Crosby
- Released: Original 78 album: 1940
- Recorded: 1936–1939
- Genre: Popular, Hawaiian
- Length: 34:55
- Label: Decca

Bing Crosby chronology
Ballad for Americans (1940)	''Decca Presents Bing Crosby In An Album of Favorite Hawaiian Songs'' (1940)	Christmas Music (1940)

Favorite Hawaiian Songs is a compilation album of phonograph records by Bing Crosby released in 1940 featuring songs that were sung in a Hawaiian-type genre. This is the second album release of many of Crosby's Hawaiian hits such as: Blue Hawaii and Sweet Leilani.

== Release history ==
This is not to be confused with the later albums of the same name. Crosby recorded four more Hawaiian songs and Dick McIntire's Harmony Hawaiians recorded two more after this album's release, and Decca had still not used "Paradise Isle" and "Aloha Kuu Ipo Aloha", stamped on Decca 3797, in an album yet – so, this album, consisting of twelve songs – along with those eight more unused songs, (a combined total of twenty songs on ten 78 rpm records) was split into two 5-disc (10 song) 78 rpm albums of the same name- Volume One and Volume Two.

== Track listing ==
These re-issued songs were featured on a 6-disc, 78 rpm album set, Decca Album No. 140.

Side / Title	Writer(s)	Recording date	Performed with	Time
Disc 1 (886):
A. "Hawaiian Paradise"	Harry Owens	August 8, 1936	Dick McIntire and His Harmony Hawaiians	2:41
B. "South Sea Island Magic"	Andylona Long, Lysle Tomerlin	August 8, 1936	Dick McIntire and His Harmony Hawaiians	3:01
Disc 2 (1175):
A. "Sweet Leilani"	Harry Owens	February 22, 1937	Lani McIntire and His Hawaiians	2:40
B. "Blue Hawaii"	Leo Robin, Ralph Rainger	February 22, 1937	Lani McIntire and His Hawaiians	3:07
Disc 3 (1616):
A. "Dancing Under the Stars"	Harry Owens	September 11, 1937	Lani McIntire and His Hawaiians	2:37
B. "Palace in Paradise"	Harry Owens	September 11, 1937	Lani McIntire and His Hawaiians	3:04
Disc 4 (2775):
A. "My Isle of Golden Dreams"	Gus Kahn, Walter Blaufuss	June 13, 1939	Dick McIntire and His Harmony Hawaiians	2:58
B. "To You Sweetheart Aloha"	Harry Owens	June 13, 1939	Dick McIntire and His Harmony Hawaiians	2:54
Disc 5 (1518):
A. "When You Dream About Hawaii"	Bert Kalmar, Harry Ruby, Sid Silvers	September 11, 1937	Lani McIntire and His Hawaiians	3:02
B. "Sail Along, Silv'ry Moon"	Harry Tobias, Percy Wenrich	September 11, 1937	Lani McIntire and His Hawaiians	2:45
Disc 6 (1845):
A. "Sweet Hawaiian Chimes"	Lani McIntire, George McConnell, Dick Sanford	April 13, 1938	Harry Owens and His Royal Hawaiian Hotel Orchestra	2:55
B. "Little Angel"	Harry Owens	April 13, 1938	Harry Owens and His Royal Hawaiian Hotel Orchestra	3:11
