= Favorite Hawaiian Songs, Vol. One =

1946 album

Favorite Hawaiian Songs Volume One
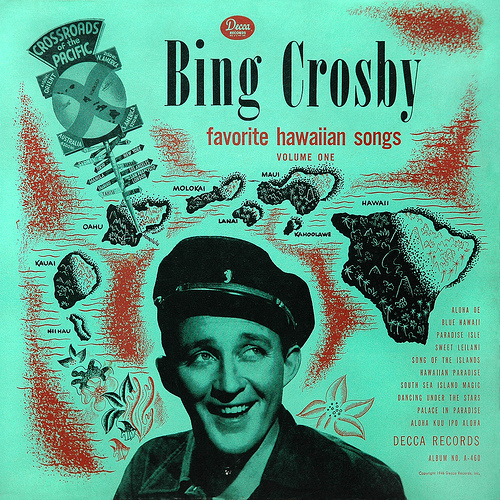

Compilation album by Bing Crosby
- Released: 1946 (original 78 rpm album); 1949 (LP reissue album); 1950 (original 45 rpm album)
- Recorded: 1936, 1937, 1940
- Genre: Popular, Hawaiian
- Length: 29:26 (original 78 rpm album); 23:34 (LP reissue album)
- Label: Decca

Bing Crosby chronology
What We So Proudly Hail (1946)	''Favorite Hawaiian Songs; Volume One'' (1946)	Favorite Hawaiian Songs, Vol. Two (1946)

Favorite Hawaiian Songs, Volume One is a compilation album of phonograph records by Bing Crosby released in 1946 featuring songs that were sung in a Hawaiian-type genre. This was the fourth Hawaiian-themed album release for Crosby.

== Release history ==
This is not to be confused with the two earlier albums of the same name. An album was released in 1940 called Favorite Hawaiian Songs. By 1946, Crosby had recorded four more Hawaiian songs and Dick McIntire's Harmony Hawaiians recorded two more. Decca hadn't used "Paradise Isle" and "Aloha Kuu Ipo Aloha", on Decca 3797, in an album yet – so, the first album, consisting of twelve songs – along with those eight more unused songs, (twenty songs on ten 78 rpm records) – was split into two five-disc (10 song) 78 rpm albums of the same name: Volume Two and this album.

== Reception ==
The reviewer for Billboard commented, inter alia:

This is an over-ambitious attempt to coin extra-added out of Bing Crosby's early recordings. In this instance the label is packaging Der Bingle's Hawaiian diskings, putting 10 sides in a set. And there's enough here for two such sets, using the same cover design of smiling Bing against a geographical picture of the islands with a descriptive booklet accompanying each set. For the first set, they are all slow and dreamy spinners, with instrumental and vocal support from Dick McIntire, Lani McIntire and the Paradise Island trio. Top faves in the first volume include "Song of the Islands" and "Sweet Leilani" … Both McIntire strumming ensembles are included in the second album, also of 10 sides, with two sides cut with Harry Owens's full band. Second set includes several selections at a livelier beat, with "Trade Winds" the top song favorite…For Der Bingle and hula fans, there's enough in these two packages to last a lifetime."

== Track listing ==
These previously issued songs were featured on a 5-disc, 78 rpm album set, Decca Album No. A-460.

Side / Title	Writer(s)	Recording date	Performed with	Time
Disc 1 (25009):
A. "Song of the Islands"	Charles E. King	July 23, 1936	the Dick McIntire and His Harmony Hawaiians	3:11
B. "Aloha Oe"	Jimmy Kennedy, Queen Liliuokalani	July 23, 1936	the Dick McIntire and His Harmony Hawaiians	3:13
Disc 2 (25010):
A. "Hawaiian Paradise"	Harry Owens	August 8, 1936	Dick McIntire and His Harmony Hawaiians	2:41
B. "South Sea Island Magic"	Andy Iona Long, Lysle Tomerlin	August 8, 1936	Dick McIntire and His Harmony Hawaiians	3:01
Disc 3 (25011):
A. "Sweet Leilani"	Harry Owens	February 22, 1937	Lani McIntire and His Hawaiians	2:40
B. "Blue Hawaii"	Leo Robin, Ralph Rainger	February 22, 1937	Lani McIntire and His Hawaiians	3:07
Disc 4 (25012):
A. "Dancing Under the Stars"	Harry Owens	September 11, 1937	Lani McIntire and His Hawaiians	2:37
B. "Palace in Paradise"	Harry Owens	September 11, 1937	Lani McIntire and His Hawaiians	3:04
Disc 5 (25013):
A. "Aloha Kuu Ipo Aloha"	Dick Mc Intire, Roland Ball	July 1, 1940	Dick McIntire and His Harmony Hawaiians	3:07
B. "Paradise Isle"	Sam Kok	July 20, 1940	the Paradise Isle Trio	2:45

== LP track listing ==
The 1949 10-inch LP album issue Decca DL 5122 consisted of eight songs on one 33 1/3 rpm record. Due to the limitations of a 10-inch LP, the last disc, containing "Aloha Kuu Ipo Aloha" and "Paradise Isle" was left out.

Side one

1. "Song of the Islands"
2. "Aloha Oe"
3. "Hawaiian Paradise"
4. "South Sea Island Magic"

Side two

1. "Sweet Leilani"
2. "Blue Hawaii"
3. "Dancing Under the Stars"
4. "Palace in Paradise"

== Other releases ==
Decca DL 5122 was also released in 1950 on four 45 rpm discs on a set numbered 9-141.
