= Bing: A Musical Autobiography =

Studio album by Bing Crosby
- Released: 1954
- Recorded: April 21–June 19, 1954
- Genre: Vocal
- Length: 3:43:20
- Label: Decca
- Producer: Buddy Cole

Bing Crosby chronology
Selections from Irving Berlin's White Christmas (1954)	Bing: A Musical Autobiography (1954)	The Country Girl / Little Boy Lost (1955)

Professional ratings
Review scores
Source	Rating
Allmusic	link

Bing: A Musical Autobiography is the sixteenth solo studio album by American singer and actor Bing Crosby, It was Crosby’s fourth Decca vinyl LP, recorded and released in 1954.

== Background ==
Ready to retire by 1954, Crosby assembled Buddy Cole and his Trio, a small group formed from members of the John Scott Trotter Orchestra, and re-recorded many of his early hits between April and June 1954. The Decca masters were used for his hits, starting with the 1938 recording of "Small Fry" Most of the new recordings were done at the American Legion Hall in Palm Springs, California.

Crosby's memoir, Call Me Lucky, was published in June 1953 by Simon & Schuster. It was written with Pete Martin.

== Discs ==
Starting in 1958, Decca released the LPs separately.

The LPs were issued as automatic couplings which would enable the five LPs to be played on an autochanger record player in chronological sequence. For instance, within album set DX-151, LP no. DL 8072 contained sides 1 and 10, DL 8073 sides 2 and 9, DL 8074 sides 3 and 8, DL 8075 sides 4 and 7, DL 8076 sides 5 and 6. A 17-EP edition was also issued with the records arranged in a similar manner.

The Musical Autobiography tracks were reissued as a four-CD set in Japan in 1992 without change from the original five LPs (MCA (Japan). Avid Entertainment in the UK released a four disc set in 2005 but with the addition of soundtrack and film promotional material from the 1930s.

== Reception ==
In an enthusiastic review of the set, John S. Wilson wrote in The New York Times, "The first half of the program in which Crosby talks about his early days and sings his early hits is an unalloyed joy, a field day for nostalgians. In view of complaints that have been made off and on for the past fifteen years that the Crosby voice was gone, that he no longer had the old touch, it is a particular pleasure to hear these early songs recorded within the past year, sung with all the old Crosby ease and charm...This is an exceptional collection of recordings, the summation of a landmark in American popular music and well worth the asking price."

At Allmusic John Bush called A Musical Autobiography "the most laborious exercise in Crosby's entire career, narrating a career history and re-recording dozens of songs." It was also issued to commemorate Decca's 20th anniversary.

Billboard reported, "Decca's merchandising displays consist of a lifelike window or floor display of Bing Crosby, mounted on an easel and with Crosby holding a copy of his musical autobiography titled simple, 'Bing.' This set...is the firm's big push for the fall."

== Personnel for re-recordings ==
- Buddy Cole – piano and organ
- Perry Botkin – guitar
- Don Whitaker – bass
- Nick Fatool – drums

== Track listing ==
Side one
No.	Title	Writer(s)	Recording date	Length
1.	"Muddy Water"	Peter DeRose, Harry Richman, Jo Trent	April 24, 1954	1:58
2.	"Mississippi Mud"	James Cavanaugh, Harry Barris	April 24, 1954	2:19
3.	"My Kinda Love"	Trent, Louis Alter	April 24, 1954	1:35
4.	"I Surrender Dear"	Gordon Clifford, Barris, Crosby	April 24, 1954	2:37
5.	"It Must Be True"	Barris, Gus Arnheim, Clifford	April 21, 1954	1:13
6.	"Wrap Your Troubles in Dreams"	Ted Koehler, Barris, Billy Moll	April 21, 1954	2:34
7.	"Out of Nowhere"	Edward Heyman, Johnny Green	June 16, 1954	1:53
8.	"Just One More Chance"	Arthur Johnston, Sam Coslow	April 21, 1954	2:12
9.	"Stardust"	Hoagy Carmichael, Mitchell Parish	June 16, 1954	2:09
10.	"Sweet and Lovely"	Harry Tobias, Jules LeMare, Arnheim	April 21, 1954	1:57
11.	"Where the Blue of the Night (Meets the Gold of the Day)"	Fred E. Ahlert, Roy Turk, Crosby	April 21, 1954	1:43
12.	"Paradise"	Nacio Herb Brown, Clifford	April 21, 1954	1:42
Total length:				23:52

Side two
No.	Title	Writer(s)	Recording date	Length
1.	"Please"	Ralph Rainger, Leo Robin	April 21, 1954	2:04
2.	"Just An Echo in the Valley"	Jimmy Campbell and Reg Connelly, Harry M. Woods	April 21, 1954	1:47
3.	"I Don't Stand a Ghost of a Chance"	Ned Washington, Victor Young, Crosby	April 21, 1954	1:51
4.	"Learn to Croon"	Johnston, Coslow	April 21, 1954	1:33
5.	"Down the Old Ox Road"	Johnston, Coslow	May 3, 1954	1:20
6.	"Thanks"	Johnston, Coslow	April 21, 1954	2:08
7.	"Black Moonlight"	Johnston, Coslow	May 3, 1954	2:34
8.	"The Day You Came Along"	Johnston, Coslow	May 3, 1954	1:57
9.	"After Sundown"	Brown, Arthur Freed	May 3, 1954	1:44
10.	"Temptation"	Brown, Freed	May 3, 1954	2:07
11.	"Love Thy Neighbour"	Harry Revel, Mack Gordon	May 3, 1954	1:35
12.	"May I?"	Revel, Gordon	May 3, 1954	1:47
13.	"Love in Bloom"	Rainger, Robin	May 3, 1954	1:45
Total length:				24:12

Side three
No.	Title	Writer(s)	Recording date	Length
1.	"I Love You Truly"	Carrie Jacobs Bond	May 3, 1954	1:56
2.	"June in January"	Rainger, Robin	May 3, 1954	1:45
3.	"Love Is Just Around the Corner"	Robin, Lewis E. Gensler	May 3, 1954	1:10
4.	"It's Easy to Remember"	Richard Rodgers, Lorenz Hart	May 3, 1954	2:16
5.	"Soon"	Rodgers, Hart	June 16, 1954	2:00
6.	"I Wished on the Moon"	Dorothy Parker, Rainger	May 3, 1954	2:03
7.	"Silent Night"	Joseph Mohr, Franz Gruber	May 3, 1954	1:39
8.	"I'm an Old Cowhand"	Johnny Mercer	May 3, 1954	1:22
9.	"I Can't Escape from You"	Richard A. Whiting, Robin	June 19, 1954	1:49
10.	"Song of the Islands"	Charles E. King	May 3, 1954	1:33
11.	"Pennies from Heaven"	Johnny Burke, Johnston	June 19, 1954	1:52
12.	"Sweet Leilani"	Harry Owens	May 3, 1954	1:36
13.	"Blue Hawaii"	Rainger, Robin	May 3, 1954	2:15
14.	"The One Rose (That's Left in My Heart)"	Del Lyon, Lani McIntyre	June 16, 1954	1:45
Total length:				25:01

Side four
No.	Title	Writer(s)	Recording date	Length
1.	"There's a Gold Mine in the Sky"	Charles Kenny, Nick Kenny	June 16, 1954	2:33
2.	"My Heart Is Taking Lessons"	James V. Monaco, Burke	June 16, 1954	1:30
3.	"I've Got a Pocketful of Dreams"	Monaco, Burke	June 16, 1954	1:24
4.	"Small Fry" (with Johnny Mercer)	Frank Loesser, Carmichael	July 1, 1938	3:35
5.	"Mexicali Rose"	Helen Stone, Jack Tenney	June 16, 1954	2:05
6.	"That Sly Old Gentleman"	Monaco, Burke	June 16, 1954	1:43
7.	"Allá en El Rancho Grande"	Emilio D. Uranga, Bartley Costello	June 16, 1954	1:01
8.	"Tumbling Tumbleweeds"	Bob Nolan	June 16, 1954	2:05
9.	"Only Forever"	Monaco, Burke	June 16, 1954	2:04
10.	"Did Your Mother Come from Ireland?"	Michael Carr, Jimmy Kennedy	June 16, 1954	2:03
11.	"Yes Indeed!" (with Connee Boswell)	Sy Oliver	December 13, 1940	3:29
12.	"Brahms' Lullaby"	Natalia Macfarren, Johannes Brahms	June 16, 1954	1:27
Total length:				24:59

Side five
No.	Title	Writer(s)	Recording date	Length
1.	"You Are My Sunshine"	Jimmie Davis, Charles Mitchell	July 8, 1941	3:03
2.	"The Waiter and the Porter and the Upstairs Maid" (with Mary Martin and Jack Teagarden)	Johnny Mercer	May 26, 1941	3:35
3.	"Deep in the Heart of Texas"	Don Swander, June Hershey	January 18, 1942	3:01
4.	"Wait 'Till the Sun Shines, Nellie" (with Mary Martin)	Andrew B. Sterling, Harry von Tilzer	March 13, 1942	2:57
5.	"Walking the Floor over You"	Ernest Tubb	May 27, 1942	3:30
6.	"White Christmas"	Irving Berlin	May 29, 1942	3:20
Total length:				19:26

Side six
No.	Title	Writer(s)	Recording date	Length
1.	"Moonlight Becomes You"	Jimmy Van Heusen, Burke	June 12, 1942	3:33
2.	"Road to Morocco" (with Bob Hope))	Van Heusen, Burke	December 8, 1944	2:49
3.	"Sunday, Monday or Always"	Van Heusen, Burke	July 2, 1943	2:54
4.	"Pistol Packin' Mama" (with The Andrews Sisters)	Al Dexter	September 27, 1943	3:18
5.	"San Fernando Valley"	Gordon Jenkins	December 29, 1943	3:24
6.	"I'll Be Seeing You"	Sammy Fain, Irving Kahal	February 17, 1944	3:08
Total length:				19:06

Side seven
No.	Title	Writer(s)	Recording date	Length
1.	"Swinging on a Star"	Van Heusen, Burke	February 7, 1944	2:51
2.	"Too-Ra-Loo-Ra-Loo-Ral (That's an Irish Lullaby)"	James Royce Shannon	July 17, 1945	3:30
3.	"Don't Fence Me In" (with The Andrews Sisters)	Cole Porter	July 25, 1944	3:32
4.	"Yah-Ta-Ta, Yah-Ta-Ta (Talk, Talk, Talk)" (with Judy Garland)	Van Heusen, Burke	March 9, 1945	3:31
5.	"It's Been a Long, Long Time"	Jule Styne, Sammy Cahn	July 12, 1945	3:26
6.	"The Bells of St. Mary's"	A. Emmett Adams, Douglas Furber	September 10, 1945	3:27
7.	"Put It There, Pal" (with Bob Hope)	Van Heusen, Burke	December 8, 1945	2:48
Total length:				23:05

Side eight
No.	Title	Writer(s)	Recording date	Length
1.	"McNamara's Band"	Shamus O'Connor, John J. Stamford	December 6, 1945	2:59
2.	"Sioux City Sue"	Ray Freedman, Dick Thomas	December 27, 1945	3:00
3.	"Begin the Beguine"	Cole Porter	May 3, 1944	4:08
4.	"South America, Take It Away" (with The Andrews Sisters)	Harold Rome	May 11, 1946	3:26
5.	"Blue Skies"	Berlin	July 11, 1946	3:38
6.	"Alexander's Ragtime Band" (with Al Jolson)	Berlin	March 27, 1947	3:21
Total length:				20:32

Side nine
No.	Title	Writer(s)	Recording date	Length
1.	"The Whiffenpoof Song"	Rudyard Kipling, Guy H. Scull, Meade Minnigerode, George S. Pomeroy	May 5, 1947	3:18
2.	"Now Is the Hour"	Clement Scott, Maewa Kaihau, Dorothy Stewart	November 8, 1947	3:23
3.	"Galway Bay"	Arthur Colahan	November 27, 1947	3:20
4.	"Far Away Places"	Joan Whitney Kramer, Alex Kramer	November 25, 1948	3:24
5.	"Mule Train"	Johnny Lange, Hy Heath, Ramblin' Tommy Scott, Fred Glickman	October 26, 1949	3:14
6.	"Dear Hearts and Gentle People"	Sammy Fain, Bob Hilliard	October 26, 1949	3:04
7.	"Rock of Ages"	Augustus Toplady	May 6, 1949	3:17
Total length:				23:00

Side ten
No.	Title	Writer(s)	Recording date	Length
1.	"Sunshine Cake" (with Carol Richards)	Van Heusen, Burke	May 10, 1949	3:28
2.	"Play a Simple Melody" (with Gary Crosby)	Berlin	May 23, 1950	3:16
3.	"Sam's Song" (with Gary Crosby)	Lew Quadling, Jack Elliott	May 23, 1950	3:11
4.	"Gone Fishin'" (with Louis Armstrong)	Nick Kenny, Charles Kenny	April 25, 1951	2:52
5.	"In the Cool, Cool, Cool of the Evening" (with Jane Wyman)	Carmichael, Johnny Mercer	June 20, 1951	3:43
6.	"Y'All Come"	Arlie Duff	November 14, 1953	2:41
7.	"Bing Crosby signs off"			0:56
Total length:				20:07

== Bonus tracks (2005 CD release) ==
When Bing: A Musical Autobiography was re-released as a 4-CD set in 2005, the label added bonus tracks that had no connection with the original album. These tracks were sourced from Bing Crosby's radio shows, publicity discs, and his short film soundtracks.

Paris Honeymoon selection (from Kraft Music Hall, June 28, 1945):

1. Banter between Ken Carpenter and Bing Crosby – 1.14
2. "The Funny Old Hills" (Ralph Rainger/Leo Robin) – 1.29
3. Banter between Carpenter and Crosby – 0.37
4. "You're a Sweet Little Headache" (Rainger/Robin) – 1.12
5. Banter between Carpenter and Crosby – 0.36
6. "I Have Eyes" (Rainger/Robin) – 2.10

The Star Maker selection (from Kraft Music Hall, April 19, 1945):

1. Banter between Ken and Crosby – 1.06
2. "An Apple for the Teacher" (Monaco/Burke) – 0.47
3. Banter between Carpenter and Crosby – 0.21
4. "Still the Bluebird Sings" (Monaco/Burke) – 0.40
5. Banter between Carpenter and Crosby – 0.16
6. "A Man and His Dream" (Monaco/Burke) – 1.57

I Surrender Dear 1931 film soundtrack selection:

1. "I Surrender Dear" – 1.31
2. "Out of Nowhere" – 1.08
3. "At Your Command" (Harry Barris/Harry Tobias/Bing Crosby) – 1.55

One More Chance 1931 film soundtrack selection:

1. "Magic C.O.D." (a parody of "I Surrender Dear") – 1.07
2. "Wrap Your Troubles in Dreams" – 2.22
3. "I'd Climb the Highest Mountain" (Lew Brown/Sidney Clare) – 1.03
4. "Just One More Chance" (Arthur Johnston/Sam Coslow) – 3.22

Dream House 1931 film soundtrack selection:

1. "When I Take My Sugar to Tea"(Sammy Fain/Irving Kahal/Pierre Norman) – 0.48
2. "It Must Be True" (Harry Barris/ Gus Arnheim/Gordon Clifford) – 1.18
3. "Dream House" (Earle Foxe/Lynn F. Cowan) – 1.11

Billboard Girl 1931 film soundtrack selection:

1. "Were You Sincere?" (Vincent Rose/Jack Meskill) – 1.24
2. "For You" (Joe Burke/Al Dubin) – 1.11

Sing, Bing, Sing 1932 film soundtrack selection:

1. "In My Hideaway" (K. L. Binford) – 1.22
2. "Between the Devil and the Deep Blue Sea" – 0.50
3. "Lovable" (Harry M. Woods/Gus Kahn) – 1.12
4. "Snuggled on Your Shoulder" – 1.48

Blue of the Night 1932 film soundtrack selection:

1. "My Silent Love" (Dana Suesse/Edward Heyman) – 0.35
2. "Auf Wiedersehen, My Dear" (Milton Ager/Ed G. Nelson/Al Hoffman /Al Goodhart) – 1.41
3. "Ev'ry Time My Heart Beats" (Benny Davis/Gerald Marks) – 1.39
4. "Where the Blue of the Night (Meets the Gold of the Day)" – 2.37

From The Big Broadcast publicity discs:

1. Banter between Stuart Erwin and Bing Crosby (take 1) – 1.18
2. "Here Lies Love" (take 1) (Rainger/Robin) – 3.13
3. Announcement by Sam Coslow – 1.41
4. "Please" (Rainger/Robin) – 2.35

Please film soundtrack selection:

1. "You're Getting to Be a Habit with Me" – 1.12
2. "I Don't Stand a Ghost of a Chance with You" – 2.09
3. "Please" (Rainger/Robin) – 1.49

From She Loves Me Not publicity discs:

1. "Love in Bloom" (with Kitty Carlisle) – 3.26
2. "Straight from the Shoulder" (with Kitty Carlisle) (Harry Revel/Mack Gordon) – 3.28
3. "I'm Hummin', I'm Whistlin', I'm Singin'" (Revel/Gordon) – 3.15

From Two for Tonight publicity discs:

1. "Two for Tonight" (Revel/Gordon) – 3.32

From Doctor Rhythm publicity discs:

1. Introduction by Gayne Whitman – 0.47
2. "This Is My Night to Dream" (Monaco/Burke) – 2.53
3. "On the Sentimental Side" (Monaco/Burke) – 1.35
4. "Only a Gypsy Knows" (with Beatrice Lillie) (Monaco/Burke) – 2.42
5. "My Heart Is Taking Lessons" (Monaco/Burke) – 2.31

From Birth of the Blues publicity discs:

1. "The Waiter and the Porter and the Upstairs Maid" (with Mary Martin and Jack Teagarden) (Johnny Mercer) – 4.05
2. "My Melancholy Baby" – 2.35

From The Big Broadcast publicity discs:

1. Banter between Stuart Erwin and Bing Crosby (take 2) – 1.13
2. "Here Lies Love" (take 2) (Rainger/Robin) – 3.15
