= "King" Bennie Nawahi =

American steel guitar master from Hawaii

Bennie Nawahi
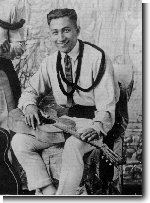
- "King" Bennie Nawahi

Background information
- Also known as: King Bennie Nawahi
- Born: Benjamin Keakahiawa Nawahi; July 3, 1899; Honolulu, Oahu, Territory of Hawaii
- Died: January 29, 1985 (aged 85) Long Beach, California
- Occupations: Musician
- Instruments: Ukulele, guitar, steel guitar, mandolin
- Years active: 1919–1970
- Labels: Columbia, Victor, QRS, Grey Gull, Yazoo
- Formerly of: Hawaiian Novelty Five, King Nawahi and the International Cowboys, Nawahi Trio

"King" Bennie Nawahi (July 3, 1899 – January 29, 1985) was an American steel guitarist from Hawaii who was popular in the U.S. during the 1920s and 1930s.

== Biography ==
Benjamin Keakahiawa Nawahi was born in Honolulu, Territory of Hawaii, one of 12 children. While not of royal descent, he was eventually nicknamed "King" as many show business personalities are for their particular genre.

Nawahi learned to play guitar in the parks of Honolulu for pennies, often teaming with Sol Hoʻopiʻi, who would later become his rival for the title "King of the Hawaiian Guitar", along with Sam Ku West. He was also known as "King of the Ukulele".

In 1919 Nawahi played with his brother Joe's band, the Hawaiian Novelty Five, on the Matsonia passenger liner that sailed between Honolulu and San Francisco. The group eventually became a staple on the Orpheum vaudeville circuit's North America tour.

Bennie Nawahi separated from the group and embarked on a solo career as a singing ukulele player. Master showman Sid Grauman proclaimed him "King of the Ukulele" and the nickname stuck.

In 1920 an act of the United States Congress established "Hawaii National Park" (later split into Hawaiʻi Volcanoes National Park and Haleakalā National Park), shining a spotlight on the islands. The 1920s became a heyday for all things Hawaiian, including novelty acts of the vaudeville genre. Among Nawahi's novelty stunts was playing Turkey in the Straw on Hawaiian guitar with his feet. Tin Pan Alley went with the Hawaii craze and between 1915 and 1929 produced such ditties as Hello Hawaii How Are You? (1915) (when many pronounced the state's name as How-Wah-Yah), Oh How She Could Yacki Hacki Wiki Wacki Woo (1916), Hula Hula Dream Girl (1924) and That Aloha Waltz (1928).

There is some evidence Bennie Nawahi also used the name "J. Nawahi", as the Victor Library lists the tune Hula Blues by "J. Nawahi (instrumentalist : steel guitar)".

By 1928 Nawahi had begun recording for multiple record labels, including Columbia, Victor, Q.R.S. and Grey Gull, under multiple names (including Red Devils, Q.R.S. Boys, Slim Smith, Hawaiian Beach Combers, Georgia Jumpers, Four Hawaiian Guitars and King Nawahi & the International Cowboys), with bandmates that included soon to be Sons of the Pioneers, Tim Spencer (singer) and Leonard Slye (later to become cowboy star Roy Rogers).

== Blindness and later life ==
One night in 1935 while driving home from a performance, Nawahi was suddenly struck blind. No medical cause was ever identified. The loss of vision was permanent, but he never allowed it to impede his life, as he continued performing and touring until the 1970s, when he was partially paralyzed by a stroke.

Nawahi set a remarkable swimming record for blind people in 1946. He swam the 22 miles of choppy Pacific Ocean waters from San Pedro, California to Santa Catalina Island in just over 22 hours, guided only by coach John Sonnichson and a bell on a lead boat.

He appeared briefly in the 1985 Academy Award-nominated documentary film on Roy Smeck, Wizard of the Strings.

He died in Long Beach, California on January 29, 1985.

== Discography ==
- From Honolulu To Hollywood: Jazz, Blues & Popular Specialties Performed Hawaiian Style (2008) CD (The Old Masters)
- Hawaiian String Virtuoso: Steel Guitar Rec 1920's (2000) CD 2055 (Yazoo)
