= Favorite Hawaiian Songs, Vol. Two =

1946 album

Favorite Hawaiian Songs Volume Two
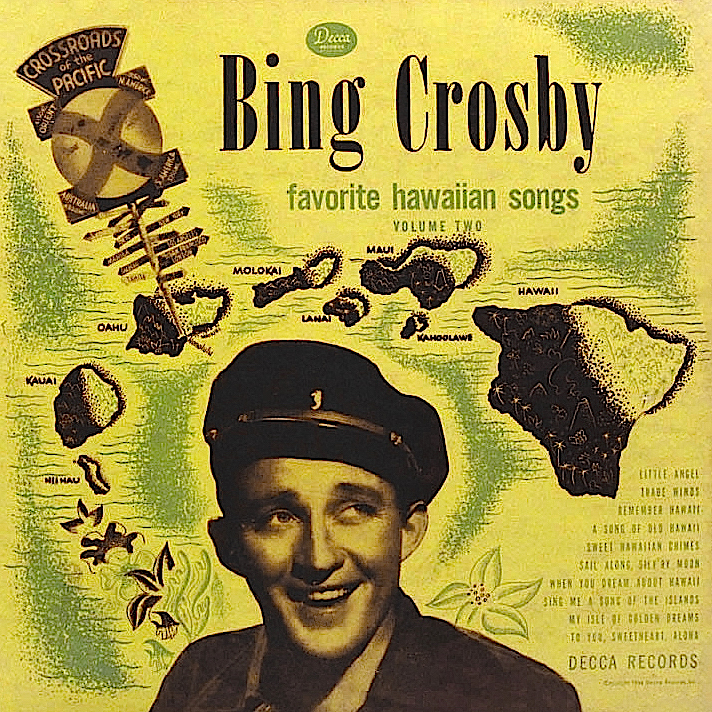

Compilation album by Bing Crosby
- Released: 1946 (original 78 rpm album); 1949 (original LP album); 1950 (original 45 album)
- Recorded: 1937, 1938, 1939, 1940, 1942
- Genre: Popular, Hawaiian
- Length: 29:37 (original 78 rpm release); 23:51 (10-inch LP release)
- Label: Decca

Bing Crosby chronology
Favorite Hawaiian Songs, Vol. One (1946)	''Favorite Hawaiian Songs; Volume Two'' (1946)	Blue Skies (w/ Fred Astaire and Irving Berlin) (1946)

Favorite Hawaiian Songs, Volume Two is a compilation album of phonograph records by Bing Crosby released in 1946 featuring songs that were sung in a Hawaiian-type genre. This was the fifth Hawaiian-themed album release for Crosby.

== Release history ==
This is not to be confused with the two earlier albums of the same name. An album was released in 1940 called Favorite Hawaiian Songs. By 1946, Crosby had recorded four more Hawaiian songs and Dick McIntire's Harmony Hawaiians recorded two more. Decca hadn't used "Paradise Isle" and "Aloha Kuu Ipo Aloha", on Decca 3797, in an album yet - so, the first album, consisting of twelve songs - along with those eight more unused songs (twenty songs on ten 78 rpm records), was split into two 5-disc (10 song) 78 rpm albums of the same name - Volume One and this album.

== Reception ==
The reviewer for Billboard commented, inter alia:

This is an over-ambitious attempt to coin extra-added out of Bing Crosby’s early recordings. In this instance the label is packaging Der Bingle’s Hawaiian diskings, putting 10 sides in a set. And there’s enough here for two such sets, using the same cover design of smiling Bing against a geographical picture of the islands with a descriptive booklet accompanying each set. For the first set, they are all slow and dreamy spinners, with instrumental and vocal support from Dick McIntire, Lani McIntire and the Paradise Island trio. Top faves in the first volume include "Song of the Islands" and "Sweet Leilani" … Both McIntire strumming ensembles are included in the second album, also of 10 sides, with two sides cut with Harry Owens’s full band. Second set includes several selections at a livelier beat, with "Trade Winds" the top song favorite … For Der Bingle and hula fans, there’s enough in these two packages to last a lifetime.

== Track listing ==
These previously issued songs were featured on a 5-disc, 78 rpm album set, Decca Album No. A-461.

Side / Title	Writer(s)	Recording date	Performed with	Time
Disc 1 (25021):
A. "When You Dream About Hawaii"	Bert Kalmar, Harry Ruby, Sid Silvers	September 11, 1937	Lani McIntire and His Hawaiians	3:02
B. "Sail Along, Silv'ry Moon"	Harry Tobias, Percy Wenrich	September 11, 1937	Lani McIntire and His Hawaiians	2:44
Disc 2 (25022):
A. "Sweet Hawaiian Chimes"	Lani McIntire, George B. McConnell, Dick Sanford	April 13, 1938	Harry Owens and His Royal Hawaiian Hotel Orchestra	2:55
B. "Little Angel"	Harry Owens	April 13, 1938	Harry Owens and His Royal Hawaiian Hotel Orchestra	3:11
Disc 3 (25023):
A. "My Isle of Golden Dreams"	Gus Kahn, Walter Blaufuss	June 13, 1939	Dick McIntire and His Harmony Hawaiians	2:58
B. "To You, Sweetheart, Aloha"	Harry Owens	June 13, 1939	Dick McIntire and His Harmony Hawaiians	2:54
Disc 4 (25024):
A. "A Song of Old Hawaii"	Gordon Beecher, Johnny Noble	July 1, 1940	Dick McIntire and His Harmony Hawaiians	2:54
B. "Trade Winds"	Charles Tobias, Cliff Friend	July 1, 1940	Dick McIntire and His Harmony Hawaiians	3:13
Disc 5 (25025):
A. "Sing Me a Song of the Islands"	Harry Owens, Mack Gordon	January 19, 1942	Dick McIntire and His Harmony Hawaiians	2:56
B. "Remember Hawaii"	Meredith Willson	January 19, 1942	Dick McIntire and His Harmony Hawaiians	2:50

== LP track listing ==
The 10-inch LP album issue Decca DL 5299 consisted of eight songs on one 33 1/3 rpm record. Because of the size limitations of the 10-inch LP, both of Dick McIntire and His Harmony Hawaiians' 1942 recordings with Crosby (Disc 5 above) were left off.

Side one

1. "When You Dream About Hawaii"
2. "Sail Along, Silv'ry Moon"
3. "Sweet Hawaiian Chimes" "Little Angel"

Side two

1. "My Isle of Golden Dreams"
2. "To You, Sweetheart, Aloha"
3. "A Song of Old Hawaii"
4. "Trade Winds"

== Other releases ==
Decca DL 5299 was also released in 1950 on four 45 rpm discs on a set numbered 9-143.
