= Sol Hoʻopiʻi =

Native Hawaiian guitarist

Background information
- Born: Solomon Hoʻopiʻi Kaʻaiʻai; 1902; Honolulu, Oahu, Hawaii
- Died: November 16, 1953 Seattle, Washington, US
- Occupation: Musician
- Instruments: Guitar, ukulele
- Years active: 1920–1953
- Labels: Decca, Brunswick
- Formerly of: Johnny Noble; The Novelty Trio; Aimee Semple McPherson

Solomon Hoʻopiʻi Kaʻaiʻai (/ˌhoʊoʊˈpiːi/ hoh-oh-PEE-ee Hawaiian pronunciation: [ˌhoʔoˈpiʔi]; 1902 – November 16, 1953) was a Native Hawaiian lap steel guitarist. A virtuoso, he was one of the most famous original Hawaiian steel guitarists, along with Joseph Kekuku, Frank Ferera, Sam Ku West and "King" Bennie Nawahi.

== Early life ==
He was born Solomon Hoʻopiʻi Kaʻaiʻai in Honolulu, Hawaii in 1902 into a large family – his birth making him the 21st child in the family.

Sol's family taught him to sing and play instruments by the time he could walk. He was playing the ukulele by age three. By his teenage years the Hawaiian steel guitar had become his instrument of choice.

He made his debut with Johnny Noble and his Orchestra. According to the Hawaiian Music Hall of Fame, at age 17 Sol and two teenage friends stowed away on the ocean liner Matsonia. They were discovered by passengers who were so charmed by their musical performances that the other passengers took up a collection to pay their fares. They landed in San Francisco, played a few club engagements, and eventually made their way to Los Angeles at the behest of Hoot Gibson to play in his country music band. Sol's friends returned to Hawaii, and Sol formed a trio with new associates.

== Sol Hoʻopiʻi Trio ==
By 1924, Hoʻopiʻi had moved to Los Angeles, where he formed the Sol Hoʻopiʻi Trio, with Glenwood Leslie and Lani McIntyre, including sometimes additional musicians, and he successfully performed in the local and then very popular Polynesian-themed night venues. His first recordings in 1925–28 featured often jazzy improvisation.

He recorded his best known material 1933 to 1938, as Sol Hoopii's Novelty Trio, Novelty Quartette and Novelty Five on Decca Records and Brunswick Records labels, like the Hula Girl, Ten Tiny Toes, and many more Hawaiian hula and hapa-haole songs penned by the Hawaiian composers like Johnny Noble and Sol Bright.

Originally favouring the acoustic lap steel guitar, he switched to electric lap steel only around 1935 and developed an original tuning, in addition to the open A or open G tunings commonly in use at the time.

He very often applied bluesy and jazzy treatments to the Tin Pan Alley standards, as well as to Hawaiian classics. His peculiar rhythmic, harmonic and melodic techniques influenced not only Hawaiian-styled musicians but also famed country and western swing steel guitarists, like Joaquin Murphy and Jerry Byrd.

== Christian ministry ==
In 1938, Hoʻopiʻi gave up his secular career to join the evangelist Aimee Semple McPherson, writing and performing songs for her tours. A rare video exists of Hoʻopiʻi playing traditional hymns on his lap steel guitar, accompanied by Christian composer Phillip Stanley Kerr on the piano.

Kerr mis-pronounces Sol's name as "hope-y". (Prior to, and for years after Hawaii's statehood, many Americans mis-pronounced the state's name as How-Wah-Yah, leading to show biz jokes about the 50th state of "How Are Ya?" )

Titled Musical Moments with Sol Hoʻopiʻi and His Hawaiian Guitar, part of The Scriptures Visualized series, this was produced in 1942 by C.O. Baptista Films of Chicago. Part 2 of the video begins with Phil Kerr and Sol Hoʻopiʻi testifying about Hoʻopiʻi's Christian conversion, and contains a rare moment of Hoʻopiʻi doing a falsetto rendition of Kerr's composition I'm in Love with the Lover of my Soul.

== Steel guitar history ==
Some historians credit Joseph Kekuku with inventing the Hawaiian steel guitar about 1889 from an acoustic Spanish guitar. This was long before Hoʻopiʻi's time. As far as the electrified lap steel, Philip Kerr mentions in the 1942 Baptista video that Hoʻopiʻi "was the originator of this electric guitar that he's playing." Hoʻopiʻi himself does not make that claim on camera and Kerr may have been saying that Hoʻopiʻi designed or made that particular guitar in his possession. However, the claim comes up again in 1950, in a Florida Newspaper announcing, "Sol Hoopii, king of the Hawaiian guitar and originator of the electric guitar..." as part of the entertainment line-up for a church anniversary. The electric lap steel guitar, in fact, was not invented by Hoʻopiʻi, but he was acquainted with its inventor, George Beauchamp, in Los Angeles. Beauchamp was a steel player who collaborated with violin repairman John Dopyera to attempt to build a steel guitar that was louder. Dopyera and Beauchamp developed a non-electric guitar prototype with a metal resonator, a large metal cone placed under the guitar bridge. They sought investors for a new company to manufacture and sell the resonator guitar. To promote their invention, they organized a lavish party hosted by millionaire Ted Kleinmeyer and asked Sol Hoʻopiʻi to demonstrate the instrument. Years later, after splitting with Dopyera, Beauchamp independently invented the first electric guitar (a lap steel), and received the patent on August 10, 1937.

== Final days and death ==
For the last few years of his life Hoʻopiʻi was blind, but he continued to play, compose, and teach. Solomon Hoʻopiʻi Kaʻaiʻai died November 16, 1953. His place of death has been listed alternately as Los Angeles, California, or Seattle, Washington.

Bud Tutmarc, a Christian Hawaiian steel guitar player based in Seattle, was a close personal friend of Sol's and stated that Sol died in Seattle. On May 27, 1953, only 6 months before Sol's death, the two friends recorded a live Seattle performance of Indiana March (Sol on steel guitar); a three-in-one gospel medley (Sol and Bud steel guitar duet) – Mansion Over the Hilltop, It Is No Secret and Aloha Oe; a medley of At Calvary and Power In The Blood (Sol solo ukulele instrumental); and I'll Go With Him (ukulele and Sol vocals).

Tutmarc died December 4, 2006, and his web site photo page has a snapshot of Sol and Bud having what looks like a one-on-one jam session. (photo #6 of the "Middle Years" gallery)

Steel guitarist George de Fretes, who died in 1981, considered Hoʻopiʻi to be his idol, and is buried next to him.

== In popular culture ==
The Sol Hoʻopiʻi Trio appears as a house band wearing "...pink shirts and matching trousers, with red cummerbunds and leis..." in the 1998 novel Damned in Paradise.

Sol Hoʻopiʻi's guitar and memorabilia make an appearance in the 2004 novel The Celestial Jukebox.

Garrison Keillor does a brief tip of the hat to "Sol Hoʻopiʻi and his Royal Hawaiians" in his 2004 novel Love Me.

Author Simon Leng likens George Harrison's slide guitar work with the Traveling Wilburys to "a 1990s Sol Hoʻopiʻi" in his 2006 book on the works of the British legend.

== Awards ==
In 1996, Hoʻopiʻi became an honoree in the Hawaiian Music Hall of Fame.

The Steel Guitar Hall of Fame inducted Hoʻopiʻi in 1979.

In 2012 Hoʻopiʻi's recording of the Gershwin standard "Fascinating Rhythm" was added to the Library of Congress's National Recording Registry list of sound recordings that "are culturally, historically, or aesthetically important, and/or inform or reflect life in the United States."

== Soundtracks ==
Hoʻopiʻi performed in a number of Hollywood "jazz" movies like His Jazz Bride, and later he was involved in the exotic movies craze, appearing notably in Bird of Paradise, Waikiki Wedding, and even some Charlie Chan mystery movies. He also performed in the soundtrack for the Betty Boop cartoon Betty Boop's Bamboo Isle.

== Discography (partial) ==
=== 78 RPM singles ===
==== Brunswick Sessions 1933–34 ====
- Hula Girls – Brunswick 6768
- King Kamehameha – Brunswick 6873
- Ten Tiny Toes, One Baby Nose – Brunswick 6687
- King's Serenade – Brunswick 6950

==== Decca Sessions 1938 ====
- Twilight Blues – Decca 2560
- Stack O' Lee – Decca 2241
- Fascinatin' Rhythm – Decca 2280
- Farewell Blues – Decca 2241

==== Compilation CD ====
- Sol Hoʻopiʻi in Hollywood Grass Skirt
- The Moana Serenaders 1974 MCA Records
- Master Of The Hawaiian Guitar (Volume I) 1977 Rounder Records
- Master Of The Hawaiian Guitar (Volume Two) 1987 Rounder Records

== Filmography ==
- Radio Kisses (1930)
- Divorced Sweethearts (1930)
- Flirtation Walk (1934)
- High Tension (1936)
- Hawaiian Nights (1939)

== See also ==
- Music of Hawaii
- American popular music
- Andy Iona
