= Up Pops the Devil =

1931 film by A. Edward Sutherland

- Lobby card
- Directed by: A. Edward Sutherland
- Written by: Arthur Kober; Eve Unsell
- Based on: Up Pops the Devil by Frances Goodrich and Albert Hackett
- Starring: Norman Foster; Carole Lombard; Richard "Skeets" Gallagher
- Cinematography: Karl Struss
- Music by: John Leipold
- Production company: Paramount Pictures
- Distributed by: Paramount Pictures
- Release date: May 20, 1931
- Running time: 85 minutes
- Country: United States
- Language: English

Up Pops the Devil is a 1931 American pre-Code comedy drama film directed by A. Edward Sutherland. The screenplay concerns an advertising man (Norman Foster) who quits his job to become a novelist, upsetting his wife (Carole Lombard) and straining their marriage. The film was released by Paramount Pictures. The screenplay is based on a 3-act play of the same name written by Albert Hackett and Frances Goodrich; the play ran on Broadway for 148 performances from September 1930 to January 1931 at the Theatre Masque.

== Cast ==
- Richard "Skeets" Gallagher as Biney Hatfield
- Stuart Erwin as Stranger
- Carole Lombard as Anne Merrick
- Lilyan Tashman as Polly Griscom
- Norman Foster as Steve Merrick
- Edward J. Nugent as George Kent
- Theodore von Eltz as Gilbert Morrell
- Joyce Compton as Luella May Carroll
- Willie Best as Laundryman
- Eulalie Jensen as Mrs. Kent
- Harry Beresford as Mr. Platt
- Effie Ellsler as Mrs. Platt
- Guy Oliver as Waldo - Handyman
- Matty Roubert - as Newsboy

== See also ==
- Thanks for the Memory (1938), a remake of this film starring Bob Hope and Shirley Ross.
