= Hapa haole music =

Genre of Hawaiian music

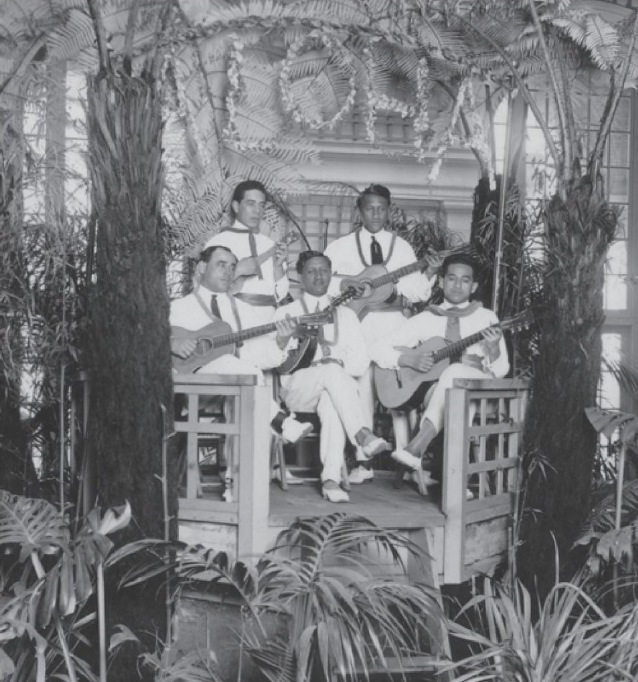
- Henry Kailimai and his Hawaiian Quintet, among the first to perform hapa haole in the mainland United States
- Stylistic origins: Hawaiian music, ragtime
- Cultural origins: 1900s – 1910s, Hawaii and mainland United States
- Typical instruments: Ukulele, steel guitar

Hapa haole music (lit. 'half foreign' in Hawaiian) is a genre of Hawaiian music which utilizes primarily English lyrics with themes and instruments attributed to Hawaii, such as the ukulele and steel guitar. Although it has its beginnings in the early 20th century with influences from traditional Hawaiian music and American ragtime, the term "hapa haole" now comprises a wide variety of styles, including swing, rock and roll, and rap. It became greatly popular in the mainland United States in the 1910s, appealing to touristic perceptions of Hawaii as an exotic paradise.

== Description ==
=== Etymology ===
"Hapa haole" is a Hawaiian term referring to someone of part-Hawaiian, part-foreign ancestry. It emerged after Christian missionaries in Hawaii introduced the term "half" to Hawaiians, which became "hapa" in Hawaiian.

=== Style ===
Hapa haole is described as Hawaiian music that uses primarily English lyrics, with both real and mock Hawaiian words sometimes included. Its lyrical content usually focuses on the people, culture, and nature of the Hawaiian Islands. Early hapa haole was influenced by music popular in the mainland United States in the early 20th century, especially ragtime. Throughout its evolution, hapa haole began to comprise other styles of music, including Hawaiian swing, rock and roll, and rap with English lyrics.

== History ==
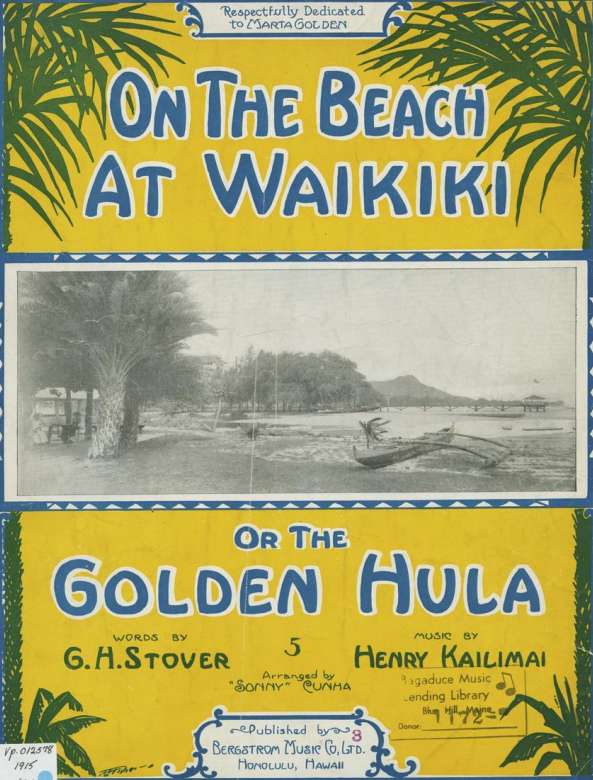
"On the Beach at Waikiki"

Around the beginning of the 20th century, stringed instruments, such as the ukulele and the steel guitar, overtook traditional wind instruments as the ones most commonly used by Hawaiian musicians. During this time, the phrase "hapa haole" first began to be used in reference to any Hawaiian song that had mostly English lyrics and influence from American genres. "My Waikiki Mermaid", possibly the first hapa haole song, was composed by Sonny Cunha in 1903.

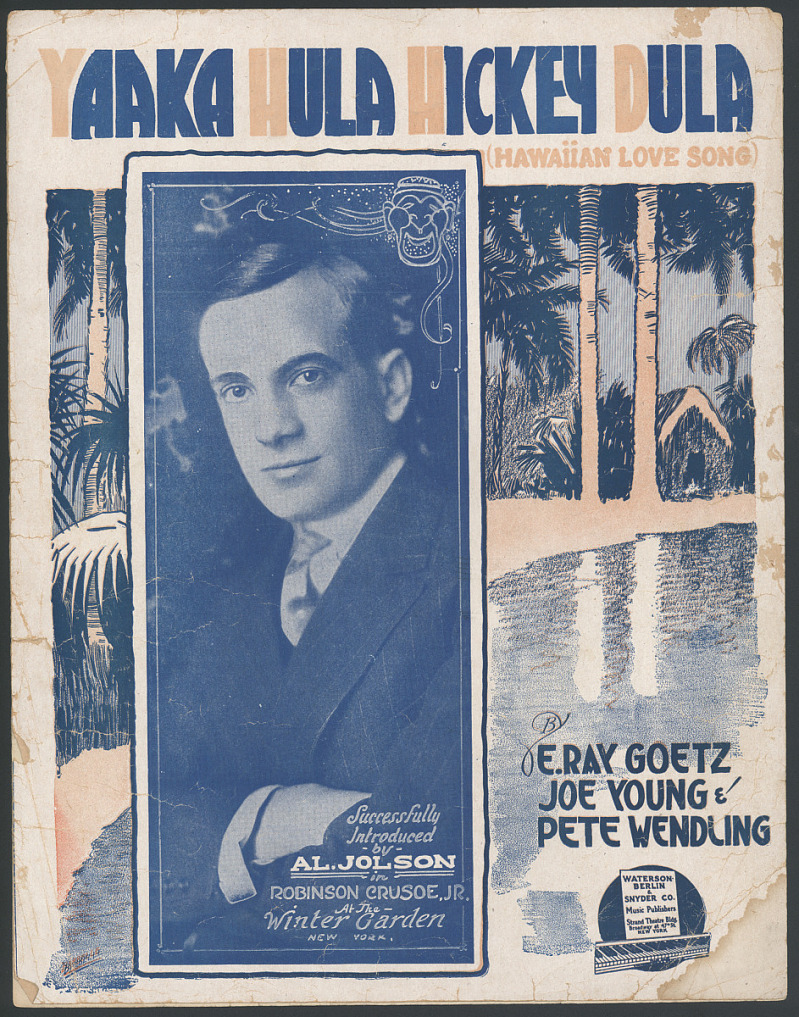
"Yaaka Hula Hickey Dula", a novelty song with faux-Hawaiian lyrics by Al Jolson

Hapa haole music was introduced to the mainland United States at multiple points through the 1910s. The 1912 Broadway musical The Bird of Paradise contained multiple songs from the genre. Additionally, hapa haole was widely performed by bands at the Panama–Pacific International Exposition in 1915 as a part of the exposition's Hawaiian Pavilion. "On the Beach at Waikiki", a hapa haole composition by Henry Kailimai which was performed at the exposition, went on to become a major hit in the mainland, one of the first of the genre to do so. Following these initial introductions of the genre in the mainland, hapa haole and Hawaiian music as a whole began to find a large amount of attention and commercial success across the country. In 1916, hapa haole was the best-selling genre in the United States. The popularity of one hapa haole artist, Johnny Noble, led to him recording 110 Hawaiian songs with Brunswick Records, a mainland label, in 1928.

Novelty songs written by non-Hawaiians, such as songwriters from Tin Pan Alley, formed a considerable amount of hapa haole songs produced following its initial explosion in popularity. Many of these songs were detached from actual Hawaiian culture, and used nonsensical, faux-Hawaiian lyrics. The songs also intended to appeal to American tourists' notions of Hawaii; specifically, the islands' perceived "exoticism and seduction". Later on, during the Hawaiian Renaissance of the 1970s, the genre was the subject of criticism due to its perceived inauthenticity.

The hapa haole "craze" peaked and began to dissipate in the 1930s. Harry Owens' "Sweet Leilani" became a number one hit in the United States following Bing Crosby's performance of the song in the 1937 film Waikiki Wedding. The song won the Academy Award for Best Original Song in 1938. The genre gradually faded in popularity until the Hawaiian Renaissance led to renewed interest in Hawaiian music, including hapa haole. Although it had beginnings in Hawaiian traditional music and ragtime, the genre evolved alongside American popular music, and now comprises other styles, including swing, rock and roll, and rap.
