= Some Like It Hot (1939 film) =

1939 film by George Archainbaud

- Theatrical poster
- Directed by: George Archainbaud
- Written by: Wilkie C. Mahoney; Lewis R. Foster
- Based on: The Great Magoo; 1932 play by Ben Hecht; Gene Fowler
- Produced by: William LeBaron
- Starring: Bob Hope; Shirley Ross; Gene Krupa
- Cinematography: Karl Struss
- Edited by: Edward Dmytryk
- Music by: Score: Arthur Franklin; Songs: Burton Lane (music); Frank Loesser (lyrics); Gene Krupa; Remo Biondi
- Distributed by: Paramount Pictures
- Release date: May 19, 1939
- Running time: 65 minutes
- Country: United States
- Language: English

Some Like It Hot, reissued for television as Rhythm Romance, is a 1939 comedy film starring Bob Hope, Shirley Ross, and Gene Krupa. Directed by George Archainbaud, its screenplay was written by Wilkie C. Mahoney and Lewis R. Foster, based on the play The Great Magoo by Ben Hecht and Gene Fowler, which performed briefly on Broadway in 1932. The film was released the year before Road to Singapore converted theatre and radio star Hope into a huge movie box office draw. Legendary cinematographer Karl Struss filmed the movie.

The title of the film is taken from a nursery rhyme, and bears no relation to Billy Wilder's acclaimed 1959 comedy film Some Like It Hot starring Marilyn Monroe, Jack Lemmon, and Tony Curtis.

== Plot summary ==
Nicky Nelson is a sidewalk entrepreneur who tries to lure passersby to see his friend Gene Krupa's band. As the strategy fails, he takes the musicians to a club, where he meets singer Lily Racquel. He takes advantage of her while pretending to help her, but love ultimately redeems him.

== Cast ==
- Bob Hope as Nicky Nelson
- Shirley Ross as Lily Racquet
- Una Merkel as Flo Saunders
- Gene Krupa as himself
- Rufe Davis as Stoney
- Bernard Nedell as Stephen Hanratty
- Frank Sully as Sailor Burke
- Bernadene Hayes as Miss Marble
- Richard Denning as Mr. Weems
- Clarence Wilson as Mr. Ives
