= Thanks for the Memory =

1938 song

Single by Bob Hope and Shirley Ross

from the album The Big Broadcast of 1938
- A-side: "Two Sleepy People"
- Published: 1938 by Paramount Music
- Recorded: 1938
- Genre: Traditional pop
- Label: Decca
- Composer(s): Ralph Rainger
- Lyricist(s): Leo Robin

"Thanks for the Memory" (1938) is a popular song composed by Ralph Rainger with lyrics by Leo Robin. It was introduced in the 1938 film The Big Broadcast of 1938 by Bob Hope and Shirley Ross, and recorded by Shep Fields and His Orchestra featuring John Serry Sr. on accordion in the film and vocals by Bob Goday on Bluebird Records (B-7318, 1937). Dorothy Lamour's solo recording of the song was also popular, and has led to many mistakenly believing over the years that it was she who sang the tune with Hope in the film (in which Lamour also appeared).

In the film, Ross and Hope's characters are a divorced couple who encounter each other aboard a ship. Near the film's end, they poignantly sing one of the many versions of this song, recalling the ups and downs of their relationship - then they decide to get back together.

In the fifth verse, Robin recalled the couple's romantic weekend in Niagara. His original lyrics were: "That weekend at Niagara when we never saw the falls." However, the line was rejected by producers who feared it was too suggestive. Robin was furious, and a bitter row ensued with neither side giving way. Finally, a compromise was reached that had Bob Hope singing, "That weekend at Niagara when we hardly saw the falls." Robin never forgave this censorship; he considered it ridiculously prissy and thought it ruined the song. However, the way Shirley Ross responds with, "How lovely that was!" indicates that "never" was indeed the better choice.

The song won the Academy Award for Best Original Song, and became Hope's signature tune, with many different lyrics adapted to any situation. In 2004, it finished No. 63 on AFI's 100 Years...100 Songs survey of top tunes in American cinema.

The success of the song resulted in another film starring the same couple. This follow-up film to The Big Broadcast of 1938 is somewhat confusing because it was given the title Thanks for the Memory but the song of that name does not feature. The main song from this latter film was "Two Sleepy People" and this is often bracketed with its forerunner as the best romantic duet of Bob Hope's career. It was written in September 1938 by Hoagy Carmichael with lyrics by Frank Loesser, and was once again performed by Bob Hope and Shirley Ross. The film Thanks for the Memory was released in 1938.

== Cover versions ==
- Shep Fields and his Rippling Rhythm Orchestra with vocalist Bobby Goday recorded the song in 1937. Bluebird Records B-7318-A
- Martha Tilton sang vocals with Benny Goodman's orchestra recorded on December 2, 1937. RCA Camden Records CAL-872
- Mildred Bailey recorded the song on January 10, 1938 with a mixed group featuring Chu Berry doing a nice tenor sax solo.
- Ella Fitzgerald recorded this with André Previn and his orchestra in 1955 (released as a single and on Sweet and Hot) and on her 1967 Verve release Whisper Not, with backing by Marty Paich and his orchestra.
- Bing Crosby recorded the song for his 1956 album, Songs I Wish I Had Sung the First Time Around.
- Jane Morgan for her album The American Girl from Paris (1956)
- Jim Hall recorded an arrangement on his 1957 debut album Jazz Guitar
- Sarah Vaughan recorded the tune for her 1958 album After Hours at the London House. She was apparently seeing the lyrics for the first time, as she stumbled over the term Parthenon twice before getting it right.
- Anita O'Day on the 1962 album Anita O'Day and Cal Tjader: Time for 2
- Harry Nilsson released a version on his 1973 album recorded with Gordon Jenkins, A Little Touch of Schmilsson in the Night.
- Wayne Shorter played a saxophone rendition on the 1979 Weather Report live album 8:30.
- Frank Sinatra recorded an extended version of the song with altered lyrics for his 1981 album, She Shot Me Down.
- Susannah McCorkle – Thanks For The Memory – Songs Of Leo Robin (1983), Most Requested Songs (2001)
- Rosemary Clooney on her 1985 album Rosemary Clooney Sings Ballads.
- Stacey Kent – included the tune on her 2001 Dreamsville album.
- Rod Stewart as the title track to his 2005 album Thanks for the Memory: The Great American Songbook, Volume IV.
