= Roy Smeck =

American musician (1900–1994)

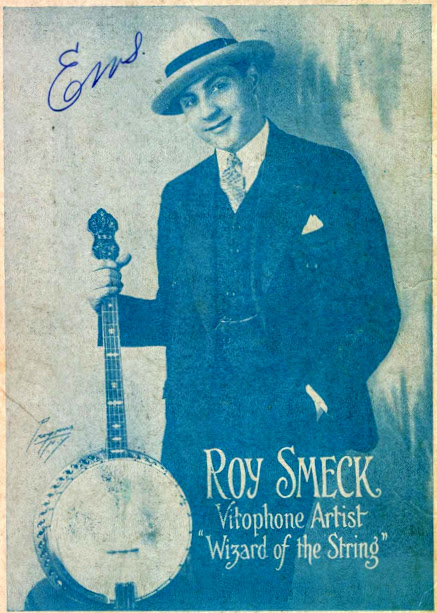
- Roy Smeck holding a 4-string banjo, from a sheet music cover

Background information
- Born: Leroy George Alfred Smeck; February 6, 1900; Reading, Pennsylvania, U.S.
- Died: April 5, 1994 (aged 94) New York City
- Genres: Country; ragtime; Hawaiian
- Occupations: Musician
- Instruments: Guitar; lap steel guitar; banjo; ukulele
- Years active: 1920s–1950s
- Labels: Coral, ABC-Paramount, “X”, Blue Goose, W & G, Kapp, Decca, Halcyon
- Formerly of: Vita Trio

Roy Smeck in the short film His Pastimes (1926)

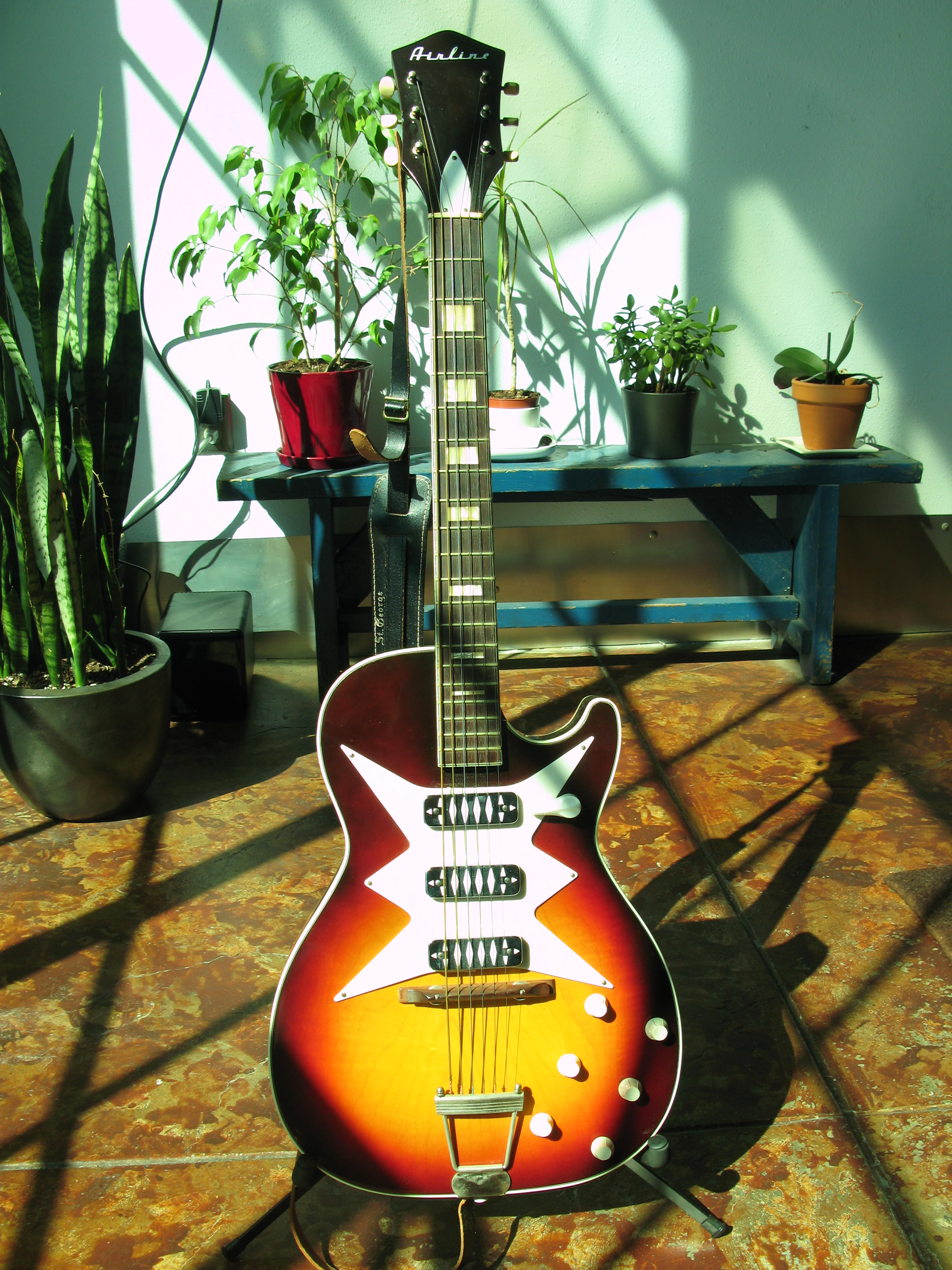
1960s Roy Smeck Custom Airline Stratotone electric guitar

Leroy George Alfred "Roy" Smeck (6 February 1900 – 5 April 1994) was an American musician. His skill on the banjo, guitar, and ukulele earned him the nickname "The Wizard of the Strings".

== Background ==
Smeck was born in Reading, Pennsylvania. He started on the vaudeville circuit. His style was influenced by Eddie Lang, Ikey Robinson, banjoist Harry Reser, Johnny Marvin and steel guitarist Sol Hoʻopiʻi. Smeck could not sing well, so he developed novelty dances and trick playing to supplement his act.

== Vaudeville ==
Smeck was one of only two vaudeville artists to play the octachord, an 8-string lap steel guitar. He was introduced to the instrument by Sam Moore when he played on the bill with Moore and Davis in 1923.

Like so many of the performers during the era, he was a big fan of the instruments created by the C.F. Martin & Company and used a variety of their instruments. Smeck was unsuccessful in obtaining an endorsement deal with Martin, who limited their support to a twenty percent discount for all performers. As a result, he endorsed the Harmony and Gibson guitars and Harmony ukuleles. Smeck was also known for his work on the Harmony company's Vita-Uke along with a number of other versions sold with his signature across the headstock.

In addition to playing the ukulele with his teeth, he would play it behind his back or even use a violin bow.

== Radio ==
Smeck was an early radio performer, putting together acts for appearances across the country. Almost all of them had his name in the band title, including The Roy Smeck Trio, The Roy Smeck Quartet, Roy Smeck and his Vita Trio, Roy Smeck's Novelty Orchestra and Roy Smeck and His Music Men.

== Notable appearances ==
On 15 April 1923, Stringed Harmony, a short film starring Smeck made in the DeForest Phonofilm sound-on-film process, premiered at the Rivoli Theater in New York City.

On 6 August 1926, Warner Brothers released Don Juan starring John Barrymore, the first feature released in the Vitaphone sound-on-disc system. On the program was a short film, His Pastimes, made in Vitaphone and starring Smeck, which made him an instant celebrity.

Smeck appeared in the film Club House Party (1932) with singing star Russ Columbo. He also appeared with Columbo in That Goes Double (1933), which featured Smeck on a screen divided into four parts, simultaneously playing steel guitar, tenor banjo, ukulele, and six-string guitar.

Smeck played at Franklin D. Roosevelt's presidential inaugural ball in 1933, George VI's coronation review in 1937, and toured globally. He appeared on television on variety shows hosted by Ed Sullivan, Steve Allen, and Jack Paar. From 1943 to 1945, he headlined a USO show that toured veteran hospitals in the United States in a show that featured the Meri-Maids, starring Marjorie Lynn, a Chicago native, of National Barn Dance fame.

== Inventor and instructor ==
Smeck designed and endorsed the Vita-Uke and other stringed instruments marketed by the Harmony Company of Chicago. He made over 500 recordings for various companies, including Edison Records, Victor Talking Machine Company, Columbia Records, Decca Records, Crown Records, RCA Records and others. He also wrote instruction/method books and arrangements for the instruments he played.

== Later life and recognition ==
A documentary by Alan Edelstein and Peter Friedman, The Wizard of the Strings (1985), was nominated for an Academy Award for Best Documentary and won an award at the Student Academy Awards.

Smeck died in New York City at age 94.

In 1998, he was inducted into the Ukulele Hall of Fame. His citation read, in part, "The 'Wizard of the Strings' captured the hearts and minds of audiences for more than six decades." He was posthumously inducted into the National Four-String Banjo Hall of Fame in 2001.

== Discography ==
Roy Smeck

- Drifting And Dreaming (Coral, 1950)
- Hi-Fi Paradise (ABC-Paramount, 1958)
- The Magic Ukulele Of Roy Smeck, Wizard Of The Strings (ABC-Paramount, 1959)
- The Magic Ukulele Of Roy Smeck (W & G, 1959)
- The Haunting Hawaiian Guitar (ABC-Paramount, 1960)
- The Many Guitar Moods Of Roy Smeck Wizard Of The Strings (ABC-Paramount, 1963)
- I Love To Hear A Banjo (ABC-Paramount, 1964)
- Roy Smeck and His Magic Uke: Wizard Of The Strings (Kapp, 1965)
- Wizard Of The Strings (Blue Goose, 1980)

Roy Smeck and His Dixie Syncopators

- The Happy Banjo (ABC-Paramount, 1959)

Roy Smeck and His Serenaders

- Drifting And Dreaming (Coral, 1950)
- Sweet Leilani (w/ The Ames Brothers) (Coral, 1951)
- Memories Of You (Decca, approx. 1957)

Roy Smeck and His All Star Serenaders

- Stringing Along (ABC-Paramount, 1962)

Roy Smeck and His Hawaiian Serenaders

- Hawaiian Guitar Hits (Kapp, 1966)

Roy Smeck and His Island Quartet

- South Of The Border (“X”, 1954)
- Christmas In Hawaii (“X”, 1954)

Roy Smeck and His Paradise Islanders

- Memory Lane (Decca, 1953)

Roy Smeck and His Paradise Serenaders

- South Seas Serenade (ABC-Paramount, 1956)
- Melodies With Memories (ABC-Paramount, 1957)
- For Your Listening And Dancing Pleasure (ABC-Paramount, 1961)
- Hawaiian Guitar Hits (Kapp, 1966)

King Oliver and His Orchestra

- Volume One - Sweet Like This (Halcyon, 1986)

== See also ==
- Banjo Hall of Fame Members
