= Two Sleepy People =

Song performed by Bob Hope and Shirley Ross

Single by Bob Hope and Shirley Ross

from the album Thanks for the Memory
- B-side: "Thanks For The Memory"
- Released: 1938
- Genre: show tune
- Length: 3:01
- Label: Decca
- Composer: Hoagy Carmichael
- Lyricist: Frank Loesser

"Two Sleepy People" is a song written on September 10, 1938, by Hoagy Carmichael with lyrics by Frank Loesser.

== Background ==
The song "Thanks for the Memory", written for the February 1938 film The Big Broadcast of 1938 by Leo Robin and Ralph Rainger and performed by Bob Hope and Shirley Ross had proved very popular. Carmichael and Loesser were asked to write a new song for a follow-up film titled Thanks for the Memory. They came up with "Two Sleepy People" which was again sung by Hope and Ross. The song tells of a young couple in love, who despite being sleepy, sit up together until dawn because they do not want to say good night and part.

The song was an immediate hit with the version by Fats Waller being the most popular. Other hit versions in 1938 were by Sammy Kaye & His Orchestra (vocal by Charlie Wilson), Kay Kyser & His Orchestra (vocals by Ginny Simms and Harry Babbitt), Bob Crosby & His Orchestra (vocals by Bob Crosby and Marian Mann), Hoagy Carmichael & Ella Logan, and by Lawrence Welk & His Orchestra (vocal by Walter Bloom). The version by Bob Hope and Shirley Ross was also popular in 1939.

== Other notable recordings ==
The song has been performed and recorded by a number of artists including Fats Waller, Al Bowlly, Bing Crosby & Marilyn Maxwell, Page Cavanaugh, Sammy Davis Jr. & Carmen McRae, Art Garfunkel, Vince Jones, Seth MacFarlane, Julie London, Dean Martin & Line Renaud, Jean Sablon, Silje Nergaard, Jack Pleis, Carly Simon & John Travolta, Peter Skellern, Hank Jones, Helen Forrest (with Artie Shaw) and a duet with Alice Babs and Ulrik Neumann and Carsie Blanton, and another duet by Seth MacFarlane and Norah Jones.

The song was performed by Dorothy Lamour on the October 30, 1938, broadcast of the Chase and Sanborn Hour radio program.

It was recorded by Philip and Vanessa in 1974 and was included on their album Two Sleepy People. This version reached the Breakers section of the UK Top 50 and was featured on Top of the Pops. It was playlisted by Capital Radio and reached number 17 on their chart.

It was performed on the 1975 variety show Twiggy, featuring Twiggy and Jeremy Brett, later renowned for his portrayal of Sherlock Holmes.

The song was performed on the episode "Elegant Iggy" of the television series Taxi — which aired on March 18, 1982 — at the end of Jim Ignatowski's impromptu musical performance. The song is omitted from the DVD release of the episode.
