= Henry Kailimai =

Hawaiian musician (1882–1948)

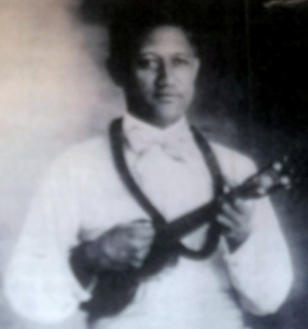
- Kailimai c. 1915

Background information
- Born: 1882; Oahu, Hawaiian Kingdom
- Died: February 7, 1948 (aged 65 or 66); Wayne County, Michigan, U.S.
- Instruments: Ukulele; Guitar; Mandolin

Henry K. Kailimai Sr. (1882 – February 7, 1948) was a Hawaiian musician, composer, and bandleader who first received attention after his band performed at the Panama–Pacific International Exposition in 1915, becoming among the first musicians to showcase Hawaiian music to mainland American audiences on a large scale. His song "On the Beach at Waikiki", which he performed at the exposition, found commercial success in the mainland United States, becoming one of the first Hawaiian songs to do so. His music attracted the attention of the business magnate Henry Ford, who hired Kailimai and his group as official musicians for the Ford Motor Company. Kailimai moved to Detroit to fill the role, where he lived until his death in 1948.

== Early life ==
Kailimai was born in 1882 to William Henry and Kaaipelana Kailimai. He was born on the island of Oahu, Hawaii. In 1902, Kailimai married Louisa Opu; they had eight children, many of whom eventually became accomplished musicians themselves. He was a Mormon, and served as an organist at his church. He was a protege of the ukulele virtuoso Ernest Kaʻai.

== Career ==
=== Panama–Pacific International Exposition ===
Prior to the 1915 Panama–Pacific International Exposition, which was to be held in San Francisco, the organizers of the fair sought to include a Hawaiian building culturally representative of the territory, as had been done at the Lewis and Clark Centennial Exposition in 1905 and the Alaska–Yukon–Pacific Exposition in 1909. In the leadup to the exposition in 1914, there was competition between multiple Hawaiian string bands, each vying for a contract to perform at the exposition. As a result of the competition, a group led by Kailimai was chosen over Jonah Kumalae's Glee Club and Ernest Kaʻai's Glee Club.

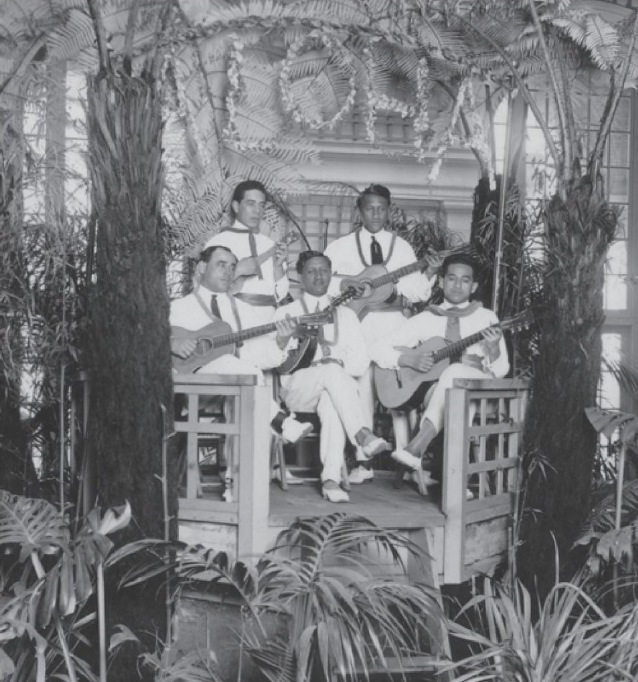
Kailimai (center) and the Hawaiian Quintet at the Panama–Pacific International Exposition, 1915

Kailimai's group, the Hawaiian Quintet, performed daily at the exposition, surrounded by tropical plants such as palm trees and ferns in the center of the Hawaiian Building's entrance hall. Large amounts of fairgoers heard Kailimai's most popular hapa haole composition "On the Beach at Waikiki" while they passed through the Hawaiian Building, which, as a result, helped the song find commercial success in the mainland United States. The composition has been considered the first Hawaiian song to become a major hit in the mainland. While "On the Beach at Waikiki" was Kailimai's most popular song, he composed many others during his lifetime, including "Sweet Brown Maid of Kaimuki", "Little Honolulu Lou", and "Paradise Isle".

=== Move to Detroit ===
One of the attendees of the Panama–Pacific International Exposition was the business magnate Henry Ford. Impressed by the performance of Kailimai and the Hawaiian Quintet, Ford formally invited the group to Detroit to serve as the Ford Motor Company's official musicians, performing at Ford promotions and events. Now called the Ford Hawaiians or the Ford Hawaiian Quintet, the band and its "tropical sound" became a popular attraction in the Midwest; one concert in Detroit recorded over 5,000 attendees, with hundreds more turned away at the box office. The group continued playing at Ford events and on Ford's radio station into the early 1920s. Henry Ford also offered each of Kailimai's sons a full education and guaranteed employment at his company.

After the disbanding of the Quintet, Kailimai remained in Detroit and held various jobs, including in the auto industry and as a sales clerk. He also taught the ukulele, guitar, and mandolin. He died on February 7, 1948, and was posthumously honored for his "outstanding musical achievements" by the Detroit City Council in 2016.
