= Thanks for the Memory (film) =

1938 film by George Archainbaud

- Lobby card featuring stars Bob Hope and Shirley Ross in a posed production still
- Directed by: George Archainbaud
- Written by: Lynn Starling; Frances Goodrich (play); Albert Hackett (play)
- Produced by: Mel Shauer
- Starring: Bob Hope; Shirley Ross; Charles Butterworth; Otto Kruger; Hedda Hopper
- Cinematography: Karl Struss
- Edited by: Alma Macrorie
- Music by: Charles Bradshaw (uncredited)
- Distributed by: Paramount Pictures
- Release date: November 18, 1938
- Running time: 75 min.
- Country: United States
- Language: English

Thanks for the Memory is a 1938 film directed by George Archainbaud and starring Bob Hope and Shirley Ross. The picture was adapted from the play by Albert Hackett and Frances Goodrich. The film is a remake of Up Pops the Devil (1931) starring Carole Lombard and Norman Foster. The titular song, "Thanks for the Memory", remained Bob Hope's theme song for the rest of his long and successful career.

== Plot ==
Bob Hope is an out of work writer who stays home and plays house husband while his wife goes to work for her former fiancé and Hope's publisher who is still carrying a torch for her.

== Cast ==
- Bob Hope as Steve Merrick
- Shirley Ross as Anne Merrick
- Charles Butterworth as Biney
- Otto Kruger as Gil Morrell
- Hedda Hopper as Polly Griscom
- Laura Hope Crews as Mrs. Kent
- Emma Dunn as Mrs. Platt
- Roscoe Karns as George Kent
- Eddie "Rochester" Anderson as Janitor
- Edward Gargan as Flanahan
- Jack Norton as Bert Monroe
- Patricia Wilder as Luella
- William Collier Sr. as Mr. Platt
- June Brewster as Frances

== History ==
The film represented Paramount Pictures' attempt to capitalize on the overwhelmingly positive response to the Oscar-winning song, "Thanks for the Memory," as performed by Hope and Ross in The Big Broadcast of 1938, released by the studio earlier the same year. The film plot, based on a 1930 stage play Up Pops the Devil by Frances Goodrich and Albert Hackett (previously filmed by Paramount in 1931, with Norman Foster and Carole Lombard) deals with an out-of-work writer who stays home and plays house husband while his wife goes to work for her former fiancé. The film features another popular song, "Two Sleepy People", which is again performed by Bob Hope and Shirley Ross and is often regarded as the companion to its predecessor, "Thanks for the Memory".
