= The Country Girl / Little Boy Lost =

The Country Girl / Little Boy Lost: Bing Crosby Sings Selections from the Paramount Picture

Studio album by Bing Crosby
- Released: 1955
- Recorded: 1953–1954
- Genre: Popular
- Label: Decca Records

Bing Crosby chronology
Bing: A Musical Autobiography (1954)	The Country Girl / Little Boy Lost: Bing Crosby Sings Selections from the Paramount Picture (1955)	Shillelaghs and Shamrocks (1956)

The Country Girl / Little Boy Lost is the seventeenth solo studio album by American singer and actor Bing Crosby, released in 1955. It was a Decca Records album of songs from the Paramount films Little Boy Lost and The Country Girl. This is not a soundtrack recording album but the songs used in the films were separately recorded for commercial release. It was issued as a 10” LP with catalog No.DL 5556. The songs from The Country Girl were also issued on an extended play record numbered ED-2156 and all of the songs from both films were used in the 15-part Bing’s Hollywood series issued by Decca in 1962.

== Background ==
Bing Crosby had moved away from his familiar light comedy musical roles in the 1950s and undertaken two dramatic roles in Little Boy Lost and The Country Girl. Neither of the films was a musical but each had songs which helped to move the action along. The song “Violets and Violins” was not sung by Crosby in the former film but by his wife played by Nicole Maurey.

== Track listing for 10" LP ==
Side one (all songs from The Country Girl and recorded on December 23, 1954.)
No.	Title	Writer(s)	Performer with	Length
1.	"It's Mine, It's Yours (The Pitchman)"	Ira Gershwin, Harold Arlen	Girl's Trio with Joe Lilley and his Orchestra	2:44
2.	"The Search Is Through"	Ira Gershwin, Harold Arlen	Joseph J. Lilley and his Orchestra	2:51
3.	"Dissertation on the State of Bliss (Love and Learn)"	Ira Gershwin, Harold Arlen	Patty Andrews	3:10
4.	"The Land Around Us"	Ira Gershwin, Harold Arlen	Joseph J. Lilley and his Orchestra	2:47

Side two (all songs from Little Boy Lost and recorded on March 12, 1953.)
No.	Title	Writer(s)	Performer with	Length
1.	"The Magic Window"	Jimmy Van Heusen, Johnny Burke	John Scott Trotter and his Orchestra	3:18
2.	"A Propos De Rien"	Jimmy Van Heusen, Johnny Burke	John Scott Trotter and his Orchestra	3:07
3.	"Cela M'est Egal (If It's All the Same to You)"	Jimmy Van Heusen, Johnny Burke	John Scott Trotter and his Orchestra	2:31
4.	"Violets and Violins"	Miarka Laparcerie, Jack Lawrence	John Scott Trotter and his Orchestra	2:25
