= Hawaii Calls (disambiguation) =

Hawaii Calls was a radio program that ran from 1935 through 1975.

Hawaii Calls may also refer to:

- Hawaii Calls (film), 1938 American film
- Hawaii Calls (album), 1941 Decca compilation album
