= The Big Broadcast of 1938 =

1938 film by Mitchell Leisen

- Promotional poster for release of The Big Broadcast of 1938
- Directed by: Mitchell Leisen
- Written by: Frederick Hazlitt Brennan; Russel Crouse; Walter DeLeon; Ken Englund; Howard Lindsay; Francis Martin
- Produced by: Harlan Thompson
- Starring: W. C. Fields; Martha Raye; Dorothy Lamour; Shirley Ross; Lynne Overman; Ben Blue; Bob Hope; Leif Erickson; Kirsten Flagstad
- Edited by: Eda Warren; Chandler House
- Music by: Boris Morros (musical direction)
- Distributed by: Paramount Pictures
- Release date: February 11, 1938
- Running time: 91 minutes
- Country: United States
- Language: English
- Budget: over $1 million

The Big Broadcast of 1938 is a Paramount Pictures musical comedy film starring W. C. Fields and featuring Bob Hope. Directed by Mitchell Leisen, the film is the last in a series of Big Broadcast movies that were variety show anthologies. This film featured the debut of Hope's signature song, "Thanks for the Memory" by Ralph Rainger.

== Plot ==
In what is being billed as "The Race of the Ages", the new forty-million-dollar "radio-powered" Streamlined Ocean Liner S.S. Gigantic ("America's Challenge for Crossing Record") is about to race its rival, the slightly smaller traditional S.S. Colossal across the Atlantic from New York's Pier 97 to Cherbourg in two-and-a-half days. Gigantic owner T. Frothingill "T.F." Bellows intends to send his nearly identical younger brother S.B. to sail aboard the Colossal, hoping he will cause trouble and sabotage the rival ship, enabling the Gigantic and his own Bellows Line to win.

However S.B., who is held back due to a golf game, ends up flying over the ocean to meet the Colossal en route and mistakenly lands aboard the deck of the Gigantic instead, much to the consternation of Captain Stafford. Matters are made worse for the Gigantic when S.B.'s outrageously unlucky daughter Martha is brought on board, being rescued after surviving the shipwreck of the yacht Hesperus V.

Popular OBC radio emcee Buzz Fielding, who has just been released from "alimony jail" and is broadcasting live from the Gigantic, is trying to juggle his three ex-wives Cleo, Grace, and Joan, his lukewarm girlfriend Dorothy Wyndham, and his inept microphone assistant Mike. Buzz does his best throughout the voyage to announce the progress of the race and introduce a series of musical acts for the pleasure of the passengers and OBC's radio audience.

Meanwhile, Dorothy is romanced by First Officer (and inventor of the Gigantic's enormous radio power plant) Robert Hayes, just as Buzz and Cleo get sentimental about their broken marriage.

== Cast ==
- W. C. Fields as T. Frothingill Bellows and S. B. Bellows
- Martha Raye as Martha Bellows
- Dorothy Lamour as Dorothy Wyndham
- Shirley Ross as Cleo Fielding
- Bob Hope as Buzz Fielding
- Lynne Overman as Scoop McPhail
- Ben Blue as Mike
- Leif Erickson as Bob Hayes
- Russell Hicks as Captain Stafford
- Billy Daniels, Leonid Kinskey, Bernard Punsly, Irving Bacon, James Craig, Peggy O'Neil
- Specialty numbers by Kirsten Flagstad, Tito Guízar, Shep Fields and his Rippling Rhythm Orchestra with John Serry Sr.

== Variety performances ==
In order of appearance

- "This Little Ripple Had Rhythm", instrumental piece performed by Shep Fields and his Rippling Rhythm Orchestra, with integrated cartoon segments.
- "Don't Tell a Secret to a Rose" and the Spanish lyrics to "Zuni Zuni" (called "I Love You" in the film) sung by Tito Guízar, with Guízar playing Spanish guitar on "Zuni Zuni".
- "You Took the Words Right Out of My Heart" sung by Dorothy Lamour and Leif Erickson
- "Brunnhilde’s Battle Cry" (from Richard Wagner's Die Walkure, Act 2 Scene 1) performed by Metropolitan Opera soprano Madame Kirsten Flagstad with an orchestra conducted by Wilfrid Pelletier.
- Comedy performance by Bob Hope, Ben Blue and Patricia Wilder; "Way Down South in Dixie", sung a cappella by Patricia Wilder.
- "You Took the Words Right Out of My Heart (reprise)" sung by Dorothy Lamour.
- "Thanks for the Memory" sung by Bob Hope and Shirley Ross.
- "Mama, That Moon is Here Again" song and slapstick dance performed by Martha Raye and dancers.
- "The Waltz Lives On", sung by Bob Hope, Shirley Ross and chorus. Includes a section from "Truckin' (They're Going Hollywood in Harlem)" sung by Martha Raye; and musical sections from "At a Georgia Camp Meeting" and "Charleston".

== Production notes ==
The screenplay is by Walter DeLeon, Ken Englund, and Francis Martin, based on an adaptation by Howard Lindsay and Russel Crouse, based on a story by Frederick Hazlitt Brennan.

The art direction is by Hans Dreier and Ernst Fegté, with interior decorations by A.E. Freudeman. Costumes were designed by Edith Head. The cartoon sequence integrated with the live action in the "Rippling Rhythm" sequence was produced by Leon Schlesinger.

The film was Hope's first feature film, and was the final film under Fields' long-running Paramount contract, before he moved to Universal Studios to make his final series of films.

While the S.S. Colossal in the film appears to be similar to the 1935 steam turbo-electric-propelled passenger ship S.S. Normandie with its classic Art Deco French Line-styled exterior, the S.S. Gigantic is a Streamline Moderne futuristic-fantasy ship inside and out (based on Norman Bel Geddes "Liner of the Future"), with deck-mounted air propellers and diesel engines powered by remote controlled radio electricity capable of reaching 65 knots, a speed more than twice that of a real ocean liner of the time. Modern cruise ships have come to somewhat resemble the Gigantic's glass-enclosed upper deck design.

== Music ==
External audio
- You may hear "This Little Ripple Had Rhythm" performed by the Shep Fields Rippling Rhythm Orchestra in 1937; Here on archive.org
- You may hear "Thanks For The Memory" performed by Bob Hope and Shirley Ross in 1938; Here on Archive.org

Ralph Rainger and Leo Robin wrote six songs that appear in the film: "This Little Ripple Had Rhythm" (an instrumental composition), "Don't Tell a Secret to a Rose", "You Took the Words Right Out of My Heart", "Thanks for the Memory", "Mama, That Moon Is Here Again", and "The Waltz Lives On".

The extended “The Waltz Lives On” sequence features musical sections from the ragtime “At a Georgia Camp-Meeting” written by Kerry Mills; and James P. Johnson's jazz classic “The Charleston;” and a short swing lyric section called “Truckin’ (They're Going Hollywood in Harlem)” written by Rube Bloom with lyrics Ted Koehler.

Boris Morros provided the musical direction and Arthur Franklin was the musical adviser.

Ralph Rainger and Leo Robin won the 1939 Oscar for Best Song for their song, "Thanks for the Memory," and the song later won an ASCAP Film and Television Music Award for "Most Performed Feature Film Standard" in 1989. The song is often regarded as a companion piece to "Two Sleepy People," written in September 1938 by Hoagy Carmichael with lyrics by Frank Loesser, which was also performed by Bob Hope and Shirley Ross in the later film, Thanks for the Memory (1939).

== Reception ==
The film is recognized by American Film Institute in these lists:

- 2004: AFI's 100 Years...100 Songs:
  - "Thanks for the Memory" – #63
- 2006: AFI's Greatest Movie Musicals – Nominated
- The song "Thanks for the Memory" won the Academy Award for Best Original Song of 1938.

== Home media ==
On May 13, 2008, The New York Times reviewed a new DVD box set of Leisen titles, released by Universal, including Big Broadcast of 1938, which is the only one of the Big Broadcast films to be released on VHS or DVD to date.

== Films in series ==
- The Big Broadcast (1932)
- The Big Broadcast of 1936
- The Big Broadcast of 1937
