= The Wizard of the Strings =

1985 film

- Directed by: Peter Friedman
- Produced by: Alan Edelstein
- Cinematography: Richard Dallett
- Production company: Strange Attractions
- Distributed by: Cinema Guild
- Release date: 1985
- Running time: 27 minutes
- Country: United States
- Language: English

The Wizard of the Strings is a 1985 American short documentary film about Roy Smeck, directed by Peter Friedman. It was nominated for an Academy Award for Best Documentary Short.

== Summary ==
The former vaudeville star, nicknamed for his virtuoso talents on guitar, ukelele, banjo and Hawaiian guitar, was shown active in his 80s teaching students and occasionally giving public performances.

== Cast ==
- Roy Smeck as himself
