= Arthur Franklin =

Australian rules footballer

Personal information
- Full name: Arthur Franklin
- Born: 6 February 1918
- Died: 22 December 1953 (aged 35)
- Original team: Seddon
- Height: 178 cm (5 ft 10 in)
- Weight: 72 kg (159 lb)

Playing career^{1}
Years	Club	Games (Goals)
1942	Melbourne	3 (2)
- ^{1} Playing statistics correct to the end of 1942.

Arthur Franklin (6 February 1918 – 22 December 1953) was an Australian rules footballer who played for the Melbourne Football Club in the Victorian Football League (VFL).
