= Shirley Ross =

American actress and singer (1913–1975)

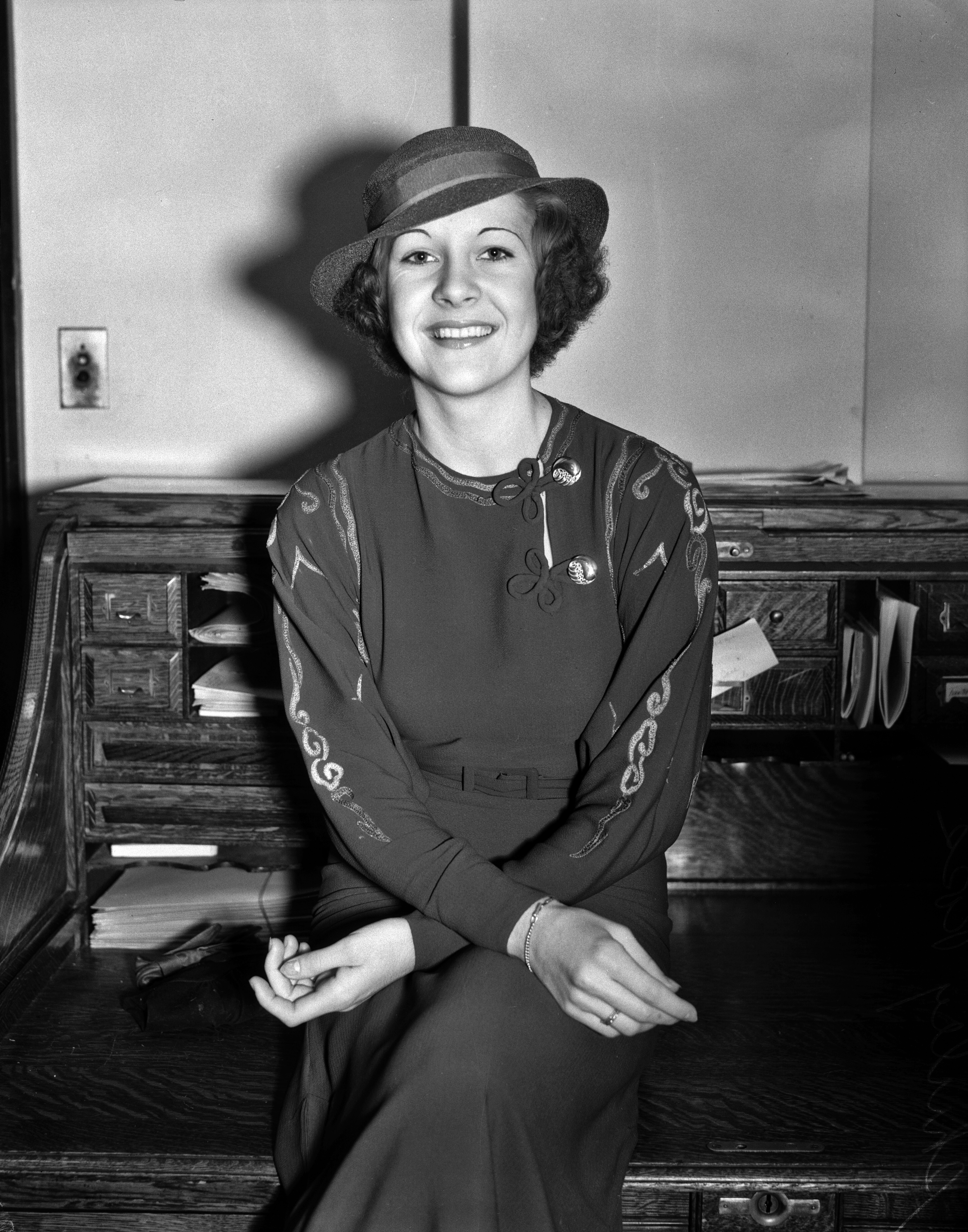
- Ross in 1933
- Born: Bernice Maude Gaunt; January 7, 1913; Omaha, Nebraska, U.S.
- Died: March 9, 1975 (aged 62); Menlo Park, California, U.S.
- Other name: Bernice Dolan Blum
- Occupations: Actress; singer
- Years active: 1927–1946
- Height: 5 ft 4 in (163 cm)
- Spouses: Ken Dolan (m. 1938; died 1951) Eddie Blum (m. 1955)
- Children: 3

Shirley Ross (born Bernice Maude Gaunt, January 7, 1913 – March 9, 1975) was an American actress and singer, notable for her duet with Bob Hope, "Thanks for the Memory" from The Big Broadcast of 1938. She appeared in 25 feature films between 1933 and 1945, including singing earlier and wholly different lyrics for the Rodgers and Hart song in Manhattan Melodrama (1934) that later became "Blue Moon."

== Early musical career ==
Ross was born in Omaha, Nebraska, the elder of two daughters of Charles Burr Gaunt and Maude C. (née Ellis) Gaunt. Growing up in California, she attended Hollywood High School and UCLA, training as a classical pianist.

By age 14, she was giving radio recitals and made her first vocal recordings at 20 with Gus Arnheim's band.

Here she attracted the notice of the up-and-coming songwriting duo Rodgers and Hart, who selected her to sell their latest offerings to the Metro-Goldwyn-Mayer movie studio. One song, "Prayer," later rewritten as "Blue Moon", led to a successful screen test in 1933. This test, a duet with jazz vocalist Harry Barris, was edited into MGM's musical-comedy short subject Gentlemen of Polish (1934), starring the comedy team of Al Shaw and Sam Lee.

MGM cast Ross in a number of small parts in films that included Manhattan Melodrama with Clark Gable and William Powell in which, made up to look black, she sang "The Bad in Every Man," an earlier version of "Blue Moon," in a Harlem nightclub.

== Paramount ==
In 1936, MGM loaned her to Paramount, and she was paired with Ray Milland in The Big Broadcast of 1937. The Big Broadcast format emphasized musical numbers and comedy sketches with big-name performers who somewhat overshadowed her. However, she acquitted herself nicely as a flippant, all-night disc jockey, and delivered the scripted dialogue naturally. One press review declared that she had "one of the sweetest voices of any actress on the screen"’ and predicted a big future for her. Paramount signed her to a five-year contract; meanwhile her introduction to the songwriting team of Leo Robin and Ralph Rainger would prove significant.

== Working with Bing Crosby and Bob Hope ==
External media

Audio
- You may hear Shirley Ross with Bob Hope singing "Thanks For The Memory" in 1938; Here on Archive.org

Video
- Shirley Ross appears with Bob Hope in the movie "Rhythm Romance" in 1939 Here on Archive.org

Her duet with Bing Crosby in Waikiki Wedding was a Robin-Rainger number titled "Blue Hawaii." Thus began a three-year period during which Ross was cast opposite either Crosby or Bob Hope on five occasions. (Note: Less than a year later, as their erstwhile co-star's career floundered, Hope and Crosby themselves were paired, beginning the longstanding and hugely successful Road to ... series.) After a career interruption in the making of This Way Please with Buddy Rogers, when she walked off the job, alleging that Jack Benny's wife, Mary Livingstone, was trying to sabotage her scenes, she was cast opposite Hope in The Big Broadcast of 1938. Their duet, "Thanks for the Memory", became a huge hit and a defining moment for two careers headed in opposite directions – for Hope, a springboard to bigger and better things; for Ross, the pinnacle. It would prove to be her sole enduring claim to fame.

The duet's great success sparked spin-off movies with Bob Hope, Thanks for the Memory (1938) and another called Some Like It Hot (1939; later renamed Rhythm Romance to avoid confusion with the unrelated 1959 feature). Although Thanks for the Memory did produce another hit song, "Two Sleepy People", the films themselves made little impact, apparently reflecting Paramount's declining interest in musical comedy. Although Ross would have been willing to play straight drama and had performed well in Prison Wife, Paramount relegated her to supporting roles in two minor romantic comedies. Although one of them (Paris Honeymoon) teamed her again with Crosby, these films failed to advance her career, which went into decline.

== Later career ==
Although Ross knew that her understated appeal was better suited to the screen than the stage, she renewed her professional relationship with Rodgers and Hart, and played the lead in their Broadway musical Higher and Higher (1940), featuring the song "It Never Entered My Mind." The show was a critical failure and ran for 108 performances. In 1942 director Arthur Lubin wanted Shirley Ross for the Abbott and Costello comedy Ride "Em Cowboy at Universal Pictures, but according to Anne Gwynne "they thought that she was too old. I heard this years afterward. He had to take me because I was under contract." Ross signed with Republic Pictures for feature films, and did some radio work, most notably as a regular cast member on The Bob Burns Show between 1943 and 1947. Burns worked closely with Bing Crosby, who may have engineered the assignment.

== Personal life ==
Ross married agent Ken Dolan in 1938 at age 25. When he became ill Ross increasingly attended him, which became an early retirement for her. He died in 1951, when Ross was 38. She married Eddie Blum in 1955, when she was 42. She had 3 children. In 1959 she said that she had given up show business to devote her time to her children, and did not regret the decision a bit.

== Death ==
Ross died from cancer in Menlo Park, California, aged 62. As her married name, Bernice Dolan Blum, was not well known, her death was not widely publicized. But Hope, with whom she had an enduring real-life friendship, did not fail to commemorate her death. He and Crosby sent a 5-foot tall cross with white carnations and a spray of red roses to her funeral. According to her daughter, the service was mobbed.

== Filmography ==
- Bombshell (1933) - Singer (uncredited)
- Jail Birds of Paradise (1934, Short) - Shirley Ross
- Morocco Nights (1934, Short) - Singer
- Manhattan Melodrama (1934) - Singer in Cotton Club
- Hollywood Party (1934) - Singer of 'Feelin' High' (uncredited)
- What Price Jazz (1934, Short) - Singer
- The Girl from Missouri (1934) - Party Guest (uncredited)
- Gentlemen of Polish (1934, Short) - Singer
- The Merry Widow (1934) - Minor Role (uncredited)
- Buried Loot (1935, Short) - Girl in Apartment (uncredited)
- Two Hearts in Wax Time (1935, Short) - Shirley (uncredited)
- Age of Indiscretion (1935) - Dotty
- Calm Yourself (1935) - Mrs. Ruth Rockwell
- I Live My Life (1935) - Vi - drunken party guest dozing in armchair next to piano (uncredited)
- It's in the Air (1935) - Cigar Stand Clerk (uncredited)
- La Fiesta de Santa Barbara (1935, Short) - Herself
- Devil's Squadron (1936) - Eunice
- San Francisco (1936) - Trixie
- The Big Broadcast of 1937 (1936) - Gwen Holmes
- Hideaway Girl (1936) - Toni Ainsworth
- Waikiki Wedding (1937) - Georgia Smith
- Blossoms on Broadway (1937) - Sally Shea
- The Big Broadcast of 1938 (1938) - Cleo Fielding
- Prison Farm (1938) - Jean Forest
- Thanks for the Memory (1938) - Anne Merrick
- Dangerous to Know (1938) - Herself / Singer on Recording (voice, uncredited)
- Paris Honeymoon (1939) - Barbara Wayne a.k.a. Countess De Remi
- Cafe Society (1939) - Bells Browne
- Some Like It Hot (1939) - Lily Racquel
- Unexpected Father (1939) - Dianna Donovan
- Kisses for Breakfast (1941) - Juliet Marsden
- Sailors on Leave (1941) - Linda Hall
- A Song for Miss Julie (1945) - Valerie Kimbro (final film role)
