= Helen Stone =

British civil engineer

Helen Stone is an English civil engineer who has been managing director of WS Atkins Structural Engineering, which she joined in 1972.

== Early life and education ==
Helen Elizabeth Stone was born in February 1950.

She attended the North London Collegiate School and was inspired to become a civil engineer through, in her own words, "a trip up the newly-opened M1 motorway when I was 10." She studied civil engineering at the University of Birmingham, obtained chartered status, and has worked on engineering projects including the Channel Tunnel, motorways, a theme park, a shopping centre, aircraft hangar and oil refinery.

== Career ==
In 1991 Stone became only the third woman to become a fellow of the Institution of Civil Engineers and in 2002 she was elected a fellow of the Royal Academy of Engineering. She is known for representing British engineering overseas, and has a particular interest in representing the interests of women in engineering. In an interview conducted by the Daily Telegraph, she shared her experience and asserted that in a wide range of countries, women were not being promoted to senior positions in engineering to the same extent as men. She chaired the Diversity Panel of the Construction Industry Council, where she worked with professional bodies, research organisations, and specialist business associations in the UK construction industry. However, despite saying that "I am conscious that I have a responsibility to break down inappropriate barriers which prevent women engineers from making progress," she is not in favour of positive discrimination, believing that it could lead to a lowering of standards.

She served for nine years as a governor at Cheltenham Ladies' College, and was later chair of governors at the North London Collegiate School for 10 years.

She chaired the Ethics and Standards Board of the APM Group, an accreditation group.

She has been a director of several organisations including the London Hostels Association and the North London Collegiate School.
