= List of ships named Matsonia =

Matsonia may refer to one of these ships operated by the Matson Navigation Company:

- SS Matsonia (1913), served as USS Matsonia (ID-1589) during World War I; sold to the Alaska Packers Association and renamed Etolin; served as United States Army troopship USAT Etolin during World War II; placed in reserve fleet in 1946, scrapped in 1957.
- SS Matsonia (1926), originally named Malolo, was renamed Matsonia in 1937; served as War Shipping Administration troopship during World War II; later sold to Home Lines and operated as Atlantic and, later, Queen Frederica; damaged by fire in 1978, she was scrapped three years later.
- SS Matsonia (1931), originally named Monterey, then renamed in 1957, before being sold and becoming Lurline and then Britanis for Chandris Lines, operating as a cruise ship for the until 2000, when she was sold for scrap and sank on her way to Indian ship breakers.
- Matsonia (1973), PONCE class steam turbine roll-on/roll-off ship, later converted to ro/ro-containership; scrapped in Texas in 2021-2022.
- A new ro/ro-containership Matsonia was ordered in 2016 for delivery in 2019/2020.
