= Blue Hawaii (song) =

1937 original film song by Leo Robin and Ralph Rainger

Single by Bing Crosby with Lani McIntyre and His Hawaiians
- A-side: "Sweet Leilani"
- Released: 1937
- Recorded: February 22, 1937
- Genre: Traditional pop
- Label: Decca Records
- Songwriters: Leo Robin, Ralph Rainger
- With Lani McIntyre and His Hawaiians

"Blue Hawaii"

Single by Billy Vaughn

from the album Blue Hawaii
- B-side: "Tico Tico"
- Released: November 1958
- Recorded: 1958
- Genre: Easy listening
- Length: 2:02
- Label: Dot
- Songwriters: Leo Robin, Ralph Rainger

Billy Vaughn singles chronology
"Cimarron" (1958)	"Blue Hawaii" (1958)	"Hawaiian War Chant" (1959)

"Blue Hawaii" is a popular song written by Leo Robin and Ralph Rainger for the 1937 Paramount Pictures film Waikiki Wedding, starring Bing Crosby and Shirley Ross. Crosby recorded a version with backing by Lani McIntyre and His Hawaiians, which was released in 1937 as the B-side of "Sweet Leilani". This reached the No. 5 spot in the charts of the day during a 13-week-stay

The song subsequently received numerous cover versions, most successfully as the title track of the 1961 Elvis Presley film, the soundtrack of which stayed at #1 on the album chart for twenty consecutive weeks.

== Other recordings ==
- Al Bowlly – HMV BD-440 (1937)
- Bing Crosby – Decca 1175 (1937). Crosby also recorded the song for the album Bing: A Musical Autobiography in 1954.
- Patti Page – Page 3 – A Collection of Her Most Famous Songs (1957 album)
- Billy Vaughn – Dot Records 45-15879 (1958): This recording peaked at No.37 on the US Hot 100.
- Frank Sinatra – Come Fly with Me (1958)
- Andy Williams – Two Time Winners (1959) and To You Sweetheart, Aloha (1959)
- George Greeley – Warner Bros. Records WS-1366 (1960)
- Wayne King – Songs of the Islands – Decca DL 74023 (1960)
- Jane Morgan – Jane Morgan Sings More Golden Hits Kapp Records KL-1275 (1961)
- Elvis Presley – Blue Hawaii (1961)
- Pat Boone with Shirley Boone – I Love You Truly (1962)
- Don Ho – Hawaii's Greatest Hits (1970)
- Willie Nelson – Honeymoon in Vegas (1992)
- Suburban Rhythm – Suburban Rhythm (1997)
- David Byrne – Big Love: Hymnal (2008)
