= Sweet Leilani =

Single by Bing Crosby with Lani McIntyre and His Hawaiians
- B-side: "Blue Hawaii"
- Released: 1937
- Recorded: February 22, 1937
- Genre: Hawaiian / Popular
- Length: 3:14
- Label: Decca Records 1175
- Songwriter: Harry Owens
- With Lani McIntyre and His Hawaiians

"Sweet Leilani" is a song featured in the 1937 film, Waikiki Wedding. It won the Academy Award for Best Original Song, and Bing Crosby's record became one of the biggest hits of 1937.

Harry Owens wrote the song on October 20, 1934 for his daughter Leilani, who was born the previous day. Leilani is a popular Hawaiian name, meaning "heavenly garland of flowers" (not "heavenly flower"). It also has a figurative meaning: small Hawaiian children were carried on their parents' shoulders like a lei (garland), so the name took on the meaning "heavenly child."

Prior to Waikiki Wedding, the song had been recorded by Sol Hoʻopiʻi under the title "Leilani" as the B-side of "Hawaiian Honeymoon" (Brunswick Records 55085).

Harry Owens and his Royal Hawaiians performed "Sweet Leilani" in the 1938 film Cocoanut Grove starring Fred MacMurray.

== Other versions ==
"Sweet Leilani" became a standard of popular and Hawaiian music, easy listening, and to some extent jazz; and has occasionally been performed by country and rock artists. The following list is not intended to be exhaustive:

=== Albums ===
- Harry Owens, Hawaii (1945)
- Andre Kostelanetz, Motion Picture Favorites (1948)
- Rosemary Clooney with Harry James, Hollywood's Best (1952)
- Bing Crosby recorded the song again in 1954 for his album Bing: A Musical Autobiography.
- Eddie Fisher, Eddie Fisher Sings Academy Award Winning Songs (1955)
- Frank Chacksfield, South Sea Island Magic (1957)
- The King Sisters, Aloha (1957)
- Marty Robbins, Song of the Islands (1957)
- Arthur Lyman, Hawaiian Sunset: The Sounds of Arthur Lyman (1958)
- André Kostelanetz, The Lure of Paradise (1959)
- Les Paul and Mary Ford, Lovers' Luau (1959)
- Billy Vaughn, Blue Hawaii (1959)
- Andy Williams, To You Sweetheart, Aloha (1959)
- George Greeley, The Most Beautiful Music of Hawaii (1960) Warner Bros. WS-1366 (LP)
- 101 Strings, In a Hawaiian Paradise (1961)
- Nelson Riddle, Love Tide (1961)
- Percy Faith, American Serenade (1963)
- Burl Ives, On the Beach at Waikiki (1965)
- Roberto Delgado, Blue Hawaii (1965)
- Henry Mancini, The Academy Award Songs (1966)
- Ray Conniff, Ray Conniff's Hawaiian Album (1967)
- The Waikikis, Pearly Shells from Hawaii (1968)
- Don Ho, Hawaii's Greatest Hits (1970)
- Roland Cazimero, Waikiki's Greatest Hits, Now! (1990)
- Chris Isaak, Baja Sessions (1996)
- Dennis Pavao, Sweet Leilani (1996)
- Ray Anthony, Dream Dancing in Hawaii (1997)
- Daniel Ho, Hawaiian Classics (1998)
- Sonny Rollins, This Is What I Do (2000)
- Teresa Bright, Tropic Rhapsody (2008)

=== Selected compilations ===
- Elton Britt, Country Music's Yodelling Cowboy Crooner, Vol. 2 (2007)
- Martin Denny, Bachelor in Paradise: The Best of Martin Denny (1996)
- Cliff Edwards ("Ukulele Ike"), Singing in the Rain (1995)
- Benny Goodman, The Essential Benny Goodman (2007)
- The Platters, Four Platters and One Lovely Dish (1994)
- Don Redman, 1936–1939 (1991)

== See also ==
- List of best-selling sheet music
