= Lani McIntyre =

Hawaiian musician (1904–1951)

Lani McIntire (sometimes spelled Lani McIntyre, 15 December 1904 – 17 June 1951) was a Hawaiian guitar and steel guitar player who helped to popularize the instrument, which eventually became a mainstay in American country and western music. He played frequently with his brothers — steel guitar legend Dick McIntire and bassist Al McIntire.

== Lani McIntyre and his Aloha Islanders ==
McIntire achieved fame playing with Sol Hoʻopiʻi in his "Novelty Trio" before heading his own acts, "Lani McIntyre and his Aloha Islanders" and later, "Lani McIntyre and his Hawai'ians." His work with Jimmie Rodgers pioneered the Hawaiian guitar sound that laid the foundation for the steel guitar as a standard country instrument, influencing the likes of Hank Williams and Elvis Presley. As leader, McIntyre released dozens of records between 1935 and 1950, for the American Record Corporation (1935), Decca (1937–1942), Sonora Records (1944 - 1945), MGM Records (1950), and Columbia Records (1950).

== Death ==
On June 17, 1951, McIntire died of a heart attack during his sleep in his apartment in the Elmwood Hotel, 110 West Forty-Ninth Street, New York, New York. His wife, Helen, was with him.

== Academy Award ==
McIntire and his Hawai'ians also worked with Bing Crosby on the original version of "Blue Hawaii" as well as "Sweet Leilani," which was popularized in the 1937 film Waikiki Wedding and won an Academy Award for Best Song in the 10th Academy Awards (over George and Ira Gershwin's "They Can't Take That Away From Me").

The band had a recording contract with Decca Records at that time.

McIntire appeared in the films You're the One Rose (1943), Maui Chant (1943), Paradise Isle (1943) and Dreams of Old Hawaii (1944).

== See also ==
- Sol Hoʻopiʻi
- Music of Hawaii
- American popular music
