= Dick McIntire =

Hawaiian musician (1902–1951)

- McIntire on the cover of his sheet music for the work Lei Aloha, 1938

Background information
- Also known as: Dick McIntire
- Born: Dick Kaihue McIntire; April 6, 1902; Honolulu, Hawaii
- Died: May 20, 1951 (aged 49)
- Genres: Hawaiian, Jazz, Swing
- Occupation: Musician
- Instrument: Lap steel guitar
- Years active: 1925–1945
- Labels: Decca Records and others

Dick Kaihue McIntire (1902–1951) was a Honolulu-born steel guitarist active in the 1930s and 1940s. During that era, Hawaiian music was quite popular in the U.S. to the extent of being a musical fad. McIntire performed on hundreds of recordings with artists such as Bing Crosby, Dorothy Lamour, Frances Langford, Ray Kinney, and Lena Machado and was featured in motion picture soundtracks. He was known for his smooth, legato approach to the electric lap steel guitar with his Los Angeles group, The Harmony Hawaiians. His brothers Lani McIntire and Al McIntire were also musicians. According to music historian Andy Volk, Dick McIntire had a profound influence on steel guitar pioneer Jerry Byrd in Byrd's formative years. McIntire was inducted into the Steel Guitar Hall of Fame in 1982.

== Early life ==
McIntire was born in 1902 in Honolulu. His mother was Hawaiian and his father Irish. His two brothers, Alfred and Lani McIntire, also had musical talent. He served in the U.S. Navy in 1919 on the USS Birmingham and formed a Hawaiian orchestra while in the Navy with his brother, Lani who served on the same ship. After military service, McIntire lived in Tijuana, Mexico for five years, then moved to California where the three brothers reunited to form an orchestra in 1929. By 1935, Dick began a career in radio with a show on KFSD in San Diego called Harmony Isle.

== Career ==
He opened several teaching studios in southern California, and gave lessons to movie stars of the day including George Brent. His orchestra played many upscale venues and, according to historian Lorene Ruymar, "He was one of the best-liked band leaders in hotels and night clubs throughout the nation". McIntire began performing in most of the Hawaiian films at the time. He made over 300 recordings with Bing Crosby, Frances Langford, Ray Kinney, and Lena Machado, mostly on the Decca label. Crosby's "Song of the Islands", "Flowered Isles", Kukuna O Ka La", and "Royal Hawaiian Hotel" showcase McIntyre's perfect tone and intonation on steel guitar.
