= Waikiki Wedding =

1937 film by Frank Tuttle

- Theatrical release poster
- Directed by: Frank Tuttle
- Written by: Frank Butler; Don Hartman; Walter DeLeon; Francis Martin
- Produced by: Arthur Hornblow Jr.
- Starring: Bing Crosby; Bob Burns; Martha Raye; Shirley Ross
- Cinematography: Karl Struss
- Edited by: Paul Weatherwax
- Music by: Leo Shuken (uncredited)
- Production company: Paramount Pictures
- Distributed by: Paramount Pictures
- Release date: March 23, 1937 (US)
- Running time: 89 minutes
- Country: United States
- Language: English
- Box office: $2 million (U.S. and Canada rentals)

Waikiki Wedding is a 1937 American musical film directed by Frank Tuttle and starring Bing Crosby, Bob Burns, Martha Raye, and Shirley Ross. Crosby plays the part of Tony Marvin, a PR man charged with extolling the virtues of the Territory of Hawaii. The female lead, played by Shirley Ross is a local beauty queen who makes unhelpful comments about the islands. Bob Burns, along with Martha Raye, are the "comic relief". Amongst the supporting cast was a young Anthony Quinn. It was made by Paramount Pictures as a rival to the Fred Astaire and Ginger Rogers films then being made by RKO Pictures.

The film is best remembered for the song "Sweet Leilani" with words and music by Harry Owens, which won the Academy Award for Best Original Song in 1937. Other songs included "Blue Hawaii", "In a Little Hula Heaven", "Nani Ona Pua", "Okolehao", and "Sweet Is the Word for You".

== Plot ==
Crosby is cast in a romantic Hawaiian setting as Tony Marvin, a publicity agent for Imperial Pineapple Company. The atmosphere is captured from the start with a Hawaiian song over the opening credits with Tony and his friend Shad, with pet pig "Walford", present at a native wedding ceremony where Tony joins in the song. In the Imperial Pineapple Company boardroom, the President, J. P. Todhunter, defends Tony against charges of neglecting his duty, pointing out that it was Tony who thought of the idea of the "Pineapple Girl" contest. The winner of the contest was promised "three romantic weeks" in Hawaii, and her happy impressions are to be syndicated in the press for publicity.

Unfortunately, Georgia Smith, the girl from Birch Falls who won the Pineapple Girl contest, and her friend Myrtle are bored and intend to return home. The prospect of such adverse publicity enrages J. P., who tells Tony that he must do something to stop the girls from leaving. To give a little romantic colour, Tony sings "Blue Hawaii" outside the girls' bungalow helped by a Hawaiian chorus. When Myrtle opens the door, he mistakes her for Georgia and is therefore unaware that it is Georgia he later meets at the dockside. While helping to repair the heel of her shoe, he accidentally tips her into the water. Drenched and angry, she, equally unaware of his identity, tells how she came to be in Hawaii and says that she could murder the one who got her into the whole mess.

Shortly afterwards, when she and Myrtle are about to board a ship bound for home, a stranger thrusts a black pearl into her hand and asks her to get it through customs. Consequently, they are prevented from leaving and Tony and Shad arrive opportunely to offer help. Apparently the pearl is sacred and must be returned to a shrine on a smaller island from which it has been stolen; if not, according to a native legend, the volcano will erupt and destroy the village. Kimo, a native, says the girls must themselves return the pearl and he takes the four of them in his boat. Tony has arranged the whole business to prevent Georgia from returning home; he has also written, in her name, glowing reports for press handouts. On the trip across to the island Tony and Georgia sing "Blue Hawaii". Meanwhile, J. P. receives a long-distance call from Georgia's fiancé, the dentist Dr. Quimby, who says that he is coming to fetch her. On the island, Georgia offers to hand over the pearl but is told to await the arrival of the high priest.

While they are detained on the island, Shad and Myrtle become well acquainted and enliven the scene with comedy episodes involving Walford the pig. Tony, with Hawaiian chorus, sings "Sweet Leilani" to a little native girl. When the high priest arrives, the pearl is handed over and at a celebration ceremony Georgia sings "In a Little Hula Heaven", with Tony singing and whistling a few lines. Myrtle sings "Okolehao", the name for a potent native drink. While the volcano continues to rumble and smoke, the high priest announces that the pearl must be fake and arrests Georgia. At Tony's instigation, the volcano's activity is manufactured by natives maintaining the fire and flames. Tony helps Georgia escape and the four make for the boat. Tony and Georgia sing "Sweet Is the Word for You".

When Georgia returns to her hotel the next day she finds Quimby and her uncle Herman awaiting her, and they explain how she has been tricked. Meanwhile, Tony, regretting his actions, has called on J. P. and told him not to publish the articles Tony has written. When he calls for Georgia, he tells her they will be married, but she is angry with him and says she will return home with Quimby and her uncle. When the three are ready to leave, Quimby is tricked by Shad into involvement with the police, which results in Quimby being arrested for assault. However, when Shad tries the same trick on Uncle Herman, he is arrested. Tony boards the ship and in the next cabin to Georgia, whistles, "Sweet Is the Word for You", but she reports him to the purser, and he is put off the ship. Myrtle arrives at the jail with Walford disguised as a dog and pays the fine to release Shad. Tony and Georgia are reunited after an old lady hired by Tony to pose as his mother visits Georgia aboard ship and persuades her that it is Tony she should marry. Over the closing credits, a chorus sings "Blue Hawaii" and "In A Little Hula Heaven".

== Cast ==
- Bing Crosby as Tony Marvin
- Bob Burns as Shad Buggle
- Martha Raye as Myrtle Finch
- Shirley Ross as Georgia Smith
- George Barbier as J.P. Todhunter
- Leif Erickson as Dr. Victor Quimby
- Grady Sutton as Everett Todhunter
- Granville Bates as Uncle Herman
- Anthony Quinn as Kimo
- Mitchell Lewis as Koalani
- George Regas as Muamua
- Nick Lukats as Assistant Purser
- Prince Leilani as Priest
- Maurice Liu as Kaiaka
- Raquel Echeverría as Mahina
- Iris Yamaoka as Secretary
- Spencer Charters as Frame
- Harry Stubbs as Keith
- Pierre Watkin as John Durkin
- Pedro Regas as Cab driver
- David Newell as Radio operator
- Emma Dunn as Tony's 'mother'
- Ray Kinney as Singer
- Robert Emmett O'Connor as First policeman

== Reception ==
Frank S. Nugent writing in The New York Times commented: "Regretting that he has but one voice to give, Bing Crosby is surrendering it cheerfully at the Paramount to the uses of the Hawaiian Board of Trade, the pineapple industry and sundry tourist agencies. His Waikiki Wedding places him in a welter of grass skirts, tropical sunsets, Martha Raye and a razorback pig called Walford...It is, at least, a workable idea for a musical comedy, even though the fabric has been stretched so far that it has burst in places...Mr. Crosby is still the pleasantest of our crooners and Miss Ross was all right, too."

Variety had minor doubts about the songs. "A romantic picture, pure and simple, Waikiki Wedding should have no difficulty getting by anywhere. It’s saccharine celluloid, sugar coated by Bing Crosby’s and Shirley Ross’ crooning in a surefire palmetto setting. The prime possible box office deterrent with this pic is that it comes so soon after the release of Crosby's Pennies from Heaven for Columbia, but this damper should not be drastic. While none of the songs here will hit the top performance brackets, they fit the picture's theme and the voices of Crosby, Shirley Ross and Martha Raye. They should get at least a minor play on the air. . . (Crosby) also makes the best of his songs, a couple of them spotted in night sailboat scenes that are very well photographed and directed."

The film is recognized by American Film Institute in these lists:

- 2004: AFI's 100 Years...100 Songs:
  - "Sweet Leilani" – Nominated

== Soundtrack ==
- "Sweet Leilani" - sung by Bing Crosby
- "In a Little Hula Heaven" (Ralph Rainger / Leo Robin) - sung by Shirley Ross and Bing Crosby
- "Blue Hawaii" - sung by Bing Crosby and Shirley Ross
- "Sweet Is the Word for You" (Ralph Rainger / Leo Robin) - sung by Bing Crosby
- "Okolehao" (Ralph Rainger / Leo Robin) - sung by Martha Raye
- "Nani Ona Pua" (Ralph Rainger / Jimmy Lowell) - sung by Bing Crosby and chorus.
- "Aloha Oe" (Queen Lydia Liliuokalani / Jimmy Kennedy) - sung by chorus

Bing Crosby recorded several of the songs for Decca Records. Crosby's songs were also included in the Bing's Hollywood series.
