= Harry Owens =

American songwriter (1902–1986)

- Harry Owens with his daughter Leilani

Background information
- Birth name: Harry Robert Owens
- Born: April 18, 1902; O'Neill, Nebraska
- Died: December 12, 1986 (aged 84); Eugene, Oregon
- Genres: Hawaiian music
- Occupation(s): Musician, Composer, arranger
- Instrument: Cornet
- Years active: 1926–1985
- Labels: Decca, Capitol, Columbia, Hamilton

Harry Robert Owens (18 April 1902 – 12 December 1986) was an American composer, bandleader and songwriter best known for his song "Sweet Leilani".

== Biography ==
Harry Robert Owens was born April 18, 1902, in O'Neill, Nebraska. He learned to play the cornet in a small band on an Indian reservation in Montana.

=== Early years ===
Owens was working the vaudeville circuit by age 14. He studied for a career in law, but then started a band in 1926, when he was booked into the Lafayette Cafe in Los Angeles and auditioned a young Bing Crosby.

=== Hawaii ===
The big turning point in his career came in 1934 with his arrival in Hawaii and his appointment as music director of The Royal Hawaiian Hotel in Waikiki. He tried to learn all he could about the local culture by mixing and working with native Hawaiians. He learned many traditional and more modern Hawaiian songs and tunes which he wrote down and orchestrated using Western notation for the first time. Many had never been written down before, much less orchestrated. He reorganized the Royal Hawaiians by splitting the band into Hawaiian and haole instrumental sections. His band featured the steel guitar, which had a trademark sound, producing tuneful and rhythmic dance music with a strong Hawaiian flavour. Hilo Hattie was a featured performer with The Royal Hawaiian Hotel Orchestra. Beginning in 1935, Owens and his orchestra were featured on the popular Saturday night radio show, Hawaii Calls.

=== Bing Crosby and Sweet Leilani ===
Bing Crosby and Owens began their friendship when both played the Lafayette Cafe in Los Angeles in 1926. In 1934, Owens wrote "Sweet Leilani" to celebrate the birth of his daughter, and made it the signature song of his Royal Hawaiian Hotel Orchestra. While vacationing in Honolulu with his wife Dixie Lee, Crosby heard the song and wanted to include it in his upcoming movie Waikiki Wedding. Harry was hesitant, but Bing convinced him. Producer Arthur Hornblow, Jr. was a hard sell. Hornblow dug in his heels that the song would not be used in the movie. Crosby retreated to the golf course and refused to return until Hornblow agreed to include the song in the film. "Sweet Leilani" won Best Song category at the 1938 10th Academy Awards, and became Crosby's first gold record.

=== Movies and television ===
Harry Owens and his Royal Hawaiians played "Sweet Leilani" in the 1938 Fred MacMurray film Cocoanut Grove. The soundtrack also featured the Owens-penned songs '"Cocoanut Grove" and "Dreamy Hawaiian Moon." They also appeared in the 1942 Betty Grable film Song of the Islands.

In 1949, Owens started to appear regularly on television. He made regular appearances in California, both in person and on television. He established the hapa haole style of Hawaii music (native music as interpreted by foreigners) which was developed by Sonny Cunha and Johnny Noble, and he enjoyed significant commercial success with this style of music-making. Owens is credited with about 300 hapa haole songs, many of which remain popular with musicians playing in this style.

Owens was a great advocate of Hawaii and things Hawaiian. He founded a tourism company and music publishing business. He died in Eugene, Oregon.

== Recognition ==
The Hawai'i Academy of Recording Arts awarded Owens the 1987 Na Hoku Hanohano Lifetime Achievement Award for his substantial contributions to the entertainment industry in Hawaii.

== Discography ==
=== Albums ===
- Hawaii, 1945, Capitol A-4, BD-4, H-166, H-238
- Songs of Hawaii, 1945, Capitol A-6, BD-6, H-268
- Hawaiian Melodies, 1948, Columbia CL-6030
- Voice Of The Trade Winds, 1952, Capitol H-333
- Polynesian Holiday, 1957, Capitol T 804
- Great Songs of Hawaii, 1965, Hamilton HLP-141, HLP-12141
